= Albrecht Dürer =

German artist and theorist (1471–1528)

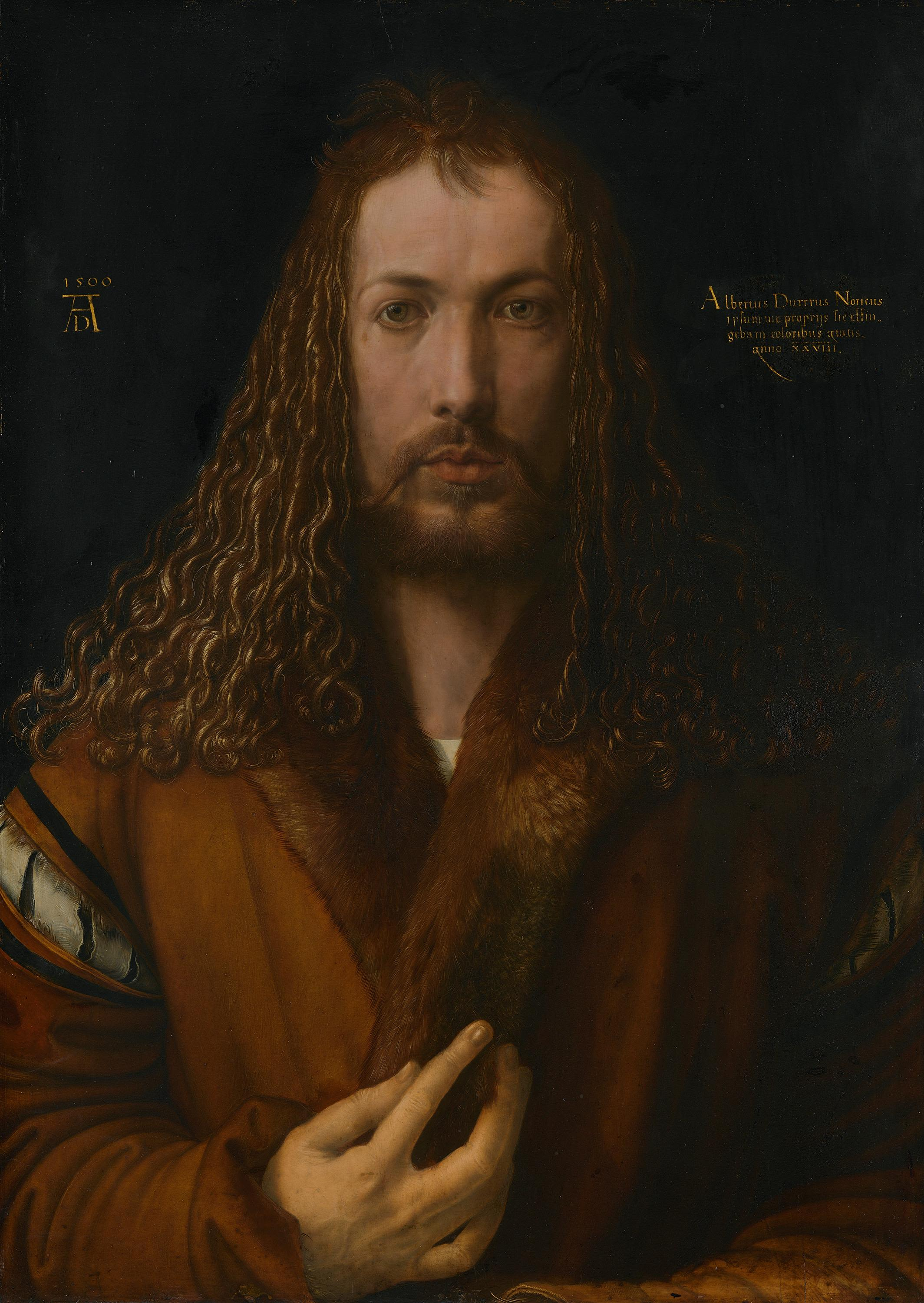
- Dürer's Self-Portrait at 28, 1500, Alte Pinakothek, Munich
- Born: 21 May 1471; Free Imperial City of Nuremberg, Holy Roman Empire
- Died: 6 April 1528 (aged 56); Free Imperial City of Nuremberg, Holy Roman Empire
- Other names: Ajtósi Adalbert; Albrecht Durer
- Known for: Painting; printmaking
- Notable work: Paintings; engravings; woodcuts; (comprehensive lists)
- Movement: Northern Renaissance
- Spouse: Agnes Frey (m. 1494)

Albrecht Dürer (/ˈdjʊərər/ DURE-ər, German: [ˈalbʁɛçt ˈdyːʁɐ]; 21 May 1471 – 6 April 1528), sometimes spelled in English as Durer or Duerer, was a German painter, printmaker, and theorist of the German Renaissance. Born in Nuremberg, Dürer established his reputation and influence across Europe in his twenties due to his high-quality woodcut prints. He was in contact with the major Italian artists of his time, including Raphael, Giovanni Bellini, and Leonardo da Vinci, and from 1512 onward was patronized by Emperor Maximilian I.

Dürer's vast body of work includes engravings, his preferred technique in his later prints, altarpieces, portraits and self-portraits, watercolours and books. The woodcuts series are stylistically more Gothic than the rest of his work, but revolutionised the potential of that medium, while his extraordinary handling of the burin expanded especially the tonal range of his engravings.

Dürer's introduction of classical motifs and of the nude into Northern art, through his knowledge of Italian artists and German humanists, has secured his reputation as one of the most important figures of the Northern Renaissance. This is reinforced by his theoretical treatises, which involve principles of mathematics for linear perspective and body proportions.

== Biography ==
=== Early life (1471–1490) ===
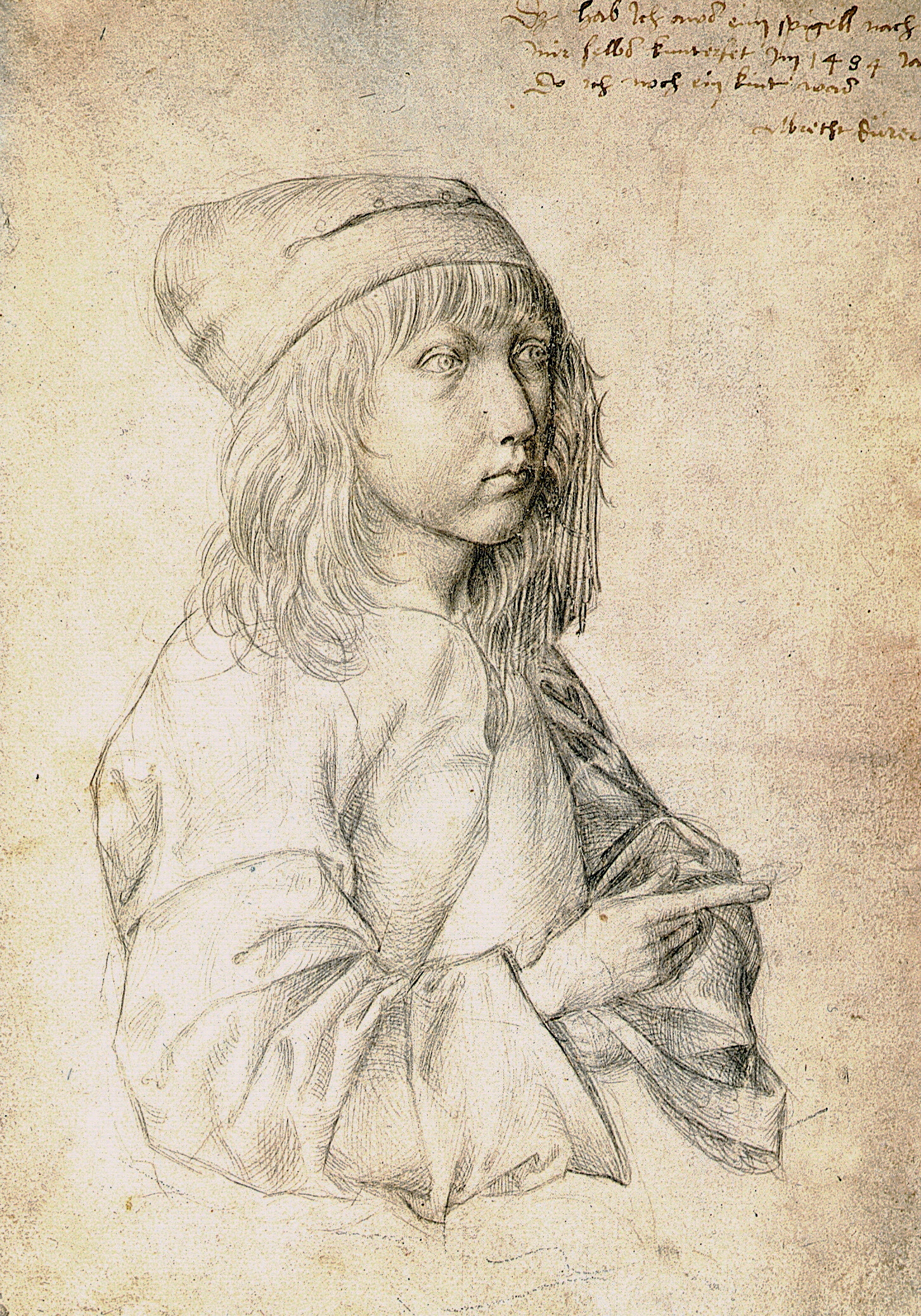
Self-portrait in silverpoint by the thirteen-year-old Dürer, 1484, Albertina, Vienna

Dürer was born on 21 May 1471, the third child and second son of Albrecht Dürer the Elder and Barbara Holper, who married in 1467. Albrecht Dürer the Elder was a successful goldsmith who by 1455 had moved to Nuremberg from Ajtós, near Gyula in Hungary. He married Barbara, his master's daughter, when he himself qualified as a master. Her mother, Klinga Öllinger had some roots in Hungary too, as she was born in Sopron. The couple had eighteen children together, of which only three survived. Hans Dürer (1490–1534), also became a painter, trained under the older Albrecht. The other surviving brother, Endres Dürer (1484–1555), took over their father's business and was a master goldsmith. The German name "Dürer" is a translation from the Hungarian, "Ajtósi". Initially, it was "Türer", meaning doormaker, which is "ajtós" in Hungarian (from "ajtó", meaning door). A door is featured in the coat-of-arms the family acquired. Albrecht Dürer the Younger later changed "Türer", his father's diction of the family's surname, to "Dürer", to adapt to the local Nuremberg dialect.

Because Dürer left autobiographical writings and was widely known by his mid-twenties, his life is well documented. After a few years of school, Dürer learned the basics of goldsmithing and drawing from his father. Though his father wanted him to continue his training as a goldsmith, he showed such a precocious talent in drawing that he was allowed to start as an apprentice to Michael Wolgemut at the age of fifteen in 1486. A self-portrait, a drawing in silverpoint, is dated 1484 (Albertina, Vienna) "when I was a child", as his later inscription says. The drawing is one of the earliest surviving children's drawings of any kind, and, as Dürer's Opus One, has helped define his oeuvre as deriving from, and always linked to, himself. Wolgemut was the leading artist in Nuremberg at the time, with a large workshop producing a variety of works of art, in particular woodcuts for books. Nuremberg was then an important and prosperous city, a centre for publishing and many luxury trades. It had strong links with Italy, especially Venice, a relatively short distance across the Alps.

Dürer's godfather Anton Koberger left goldsmithing to become a printer and publisher in the year of Dürer's birth. He became the most successful publisher in Germany, eventually owning twenty-four printing-presses and a number of offices in Germany and abroad. Koberger's most famous publication was the Nuremberg Chronicle, published in 1493 in German and Latin editions. It contained an unprecedented 1,809 woodcut illustrations (albeit with many repeated uses of the same block) by the Wolgemut workshop. Dürer may have worked on some of these, as the work on the project began while he was with Wolgemut.

=== Wanderjahre and marriage (1490–1494) ===
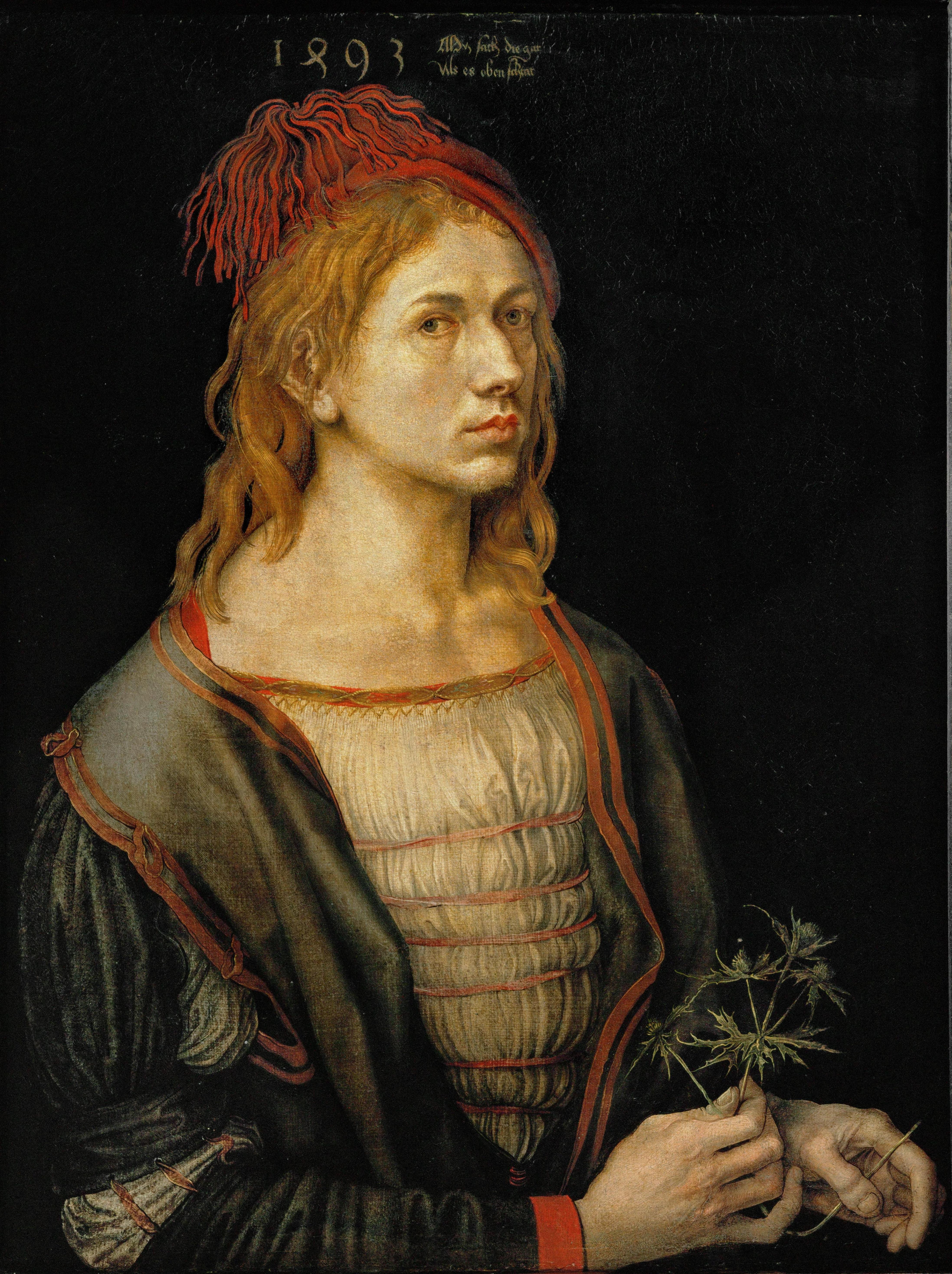
The earliest painted Self-Portrait (Holding a Thistle), 1493, oil, originally on vellum, Louvre, Paris

After completing his apprenticeship, Dürer followed the common German custom of taking Wanderjahre—in effect gap years—in which the apprentice learned skills from other masters, their local tradition and individual styles; Dürer was to spend about four years away. He left in 1490, possibly to work under Martin Schongauer, the leading engraver of Northern Europe, but who died shortly before Dürer's arrival at Colmar in 1492. It is unclear where Dürer travelled in the intervening period, though it is likely that he went to Frankfurt and the Netherlands. In Colmar, Dürer was welcomed by Schongauer's brothers, the goldsmiths Caspar and Paul and the painter Ludwig. Later that year, Dürer travelled to Basel to stay with another brother of Martin Schongauer, the goldsmith Georg. (Note: Here he produced a woodcut of St Jerome as a frontispiece for Nicholaus Kessler's Epistolare beati Hieronymi. Erwin Panofsky argues that this print combined the "Ulmian style" of Koberger's Lives of the Saints (1488) and that of Wolgemut's workshop. Panofsky (1945), 21.) In 1493 Dürer went to Strasbourg, where he would have seen the sculpture of Nikolaus Gerhaert. His first painted self-portrait (now in the Louvre) was painted at this time, probably to be sent back to his fiancée in Nuremberg.

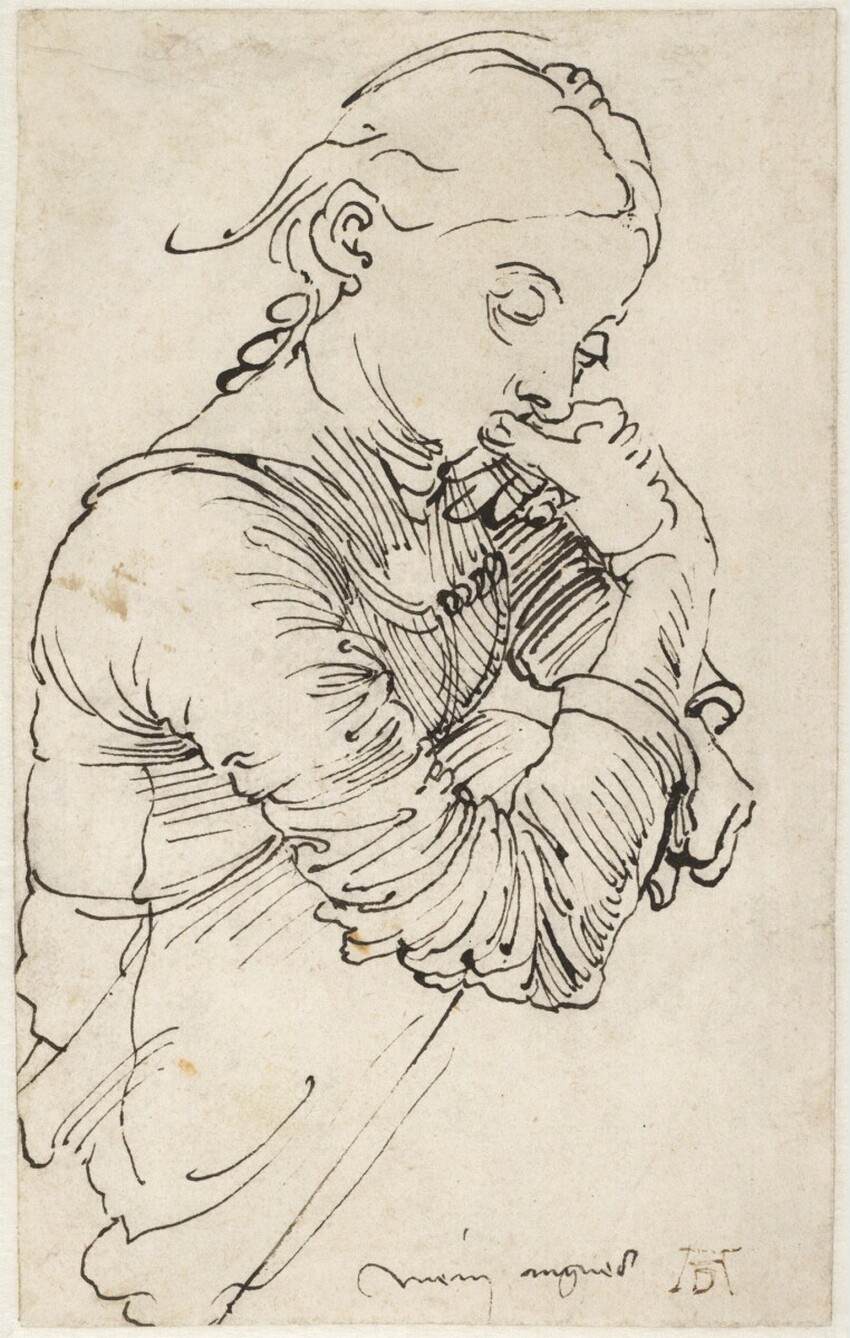
Dürer's sketch of his wife Agnes Frey (″Mein Agnes"), 1494, Albertina, Vienna

Very soon after his return to Nuremberg, on 7 July 1494, at the age of 23, Dürer was married to Agnes Frey following an arrangement made during his absence. Agnes was the daughter of a prominent brass worker (and amateur harpist) in the city. However, no children resulted from the marriage, and with Albrecht, the Dürer name died out. The marriage between Agnes and Albrecht was believed not to be a generally happy one, as indicated by a letter of Dürer in which he quipped to Willibald Pirckheimer in a rough tone about his wife, calling her an "old crow" and made other vulgar remarks. Pirckheimer also made no secret of his antipathy towards Agnes, describing her as a miserly shrew with a bitter tongue, who helped cause Dürer's death at a relatively young age. It has been hypothesized by many scholars that Albrecht was bisexual or homosexual, due to the recurrence of allegedly homoerotic themes in some of his works (e.g. The Men's Bath), and the nature of his correspondence with close friends.

=== First journey to Italy (1494–1495) ===
Within three months of his marriage, Dürer left for Italy, alone, perhaps prompted by an outbreak of plague in Nuremberg. He made watercolour sketches as he traveled over the Alps. Some have survived and others may be deduced from accurate landscapes of real places in his later work, for example, his engraving Nemesis.

In Italy, he went to Venice to study its more advanced artistic world. Through Wolgemut's tutelage, Dürer had learned how to make prints in drypoint and design woodcuts in the German style, based on the works of Schongauer and the Housebook Master. He also would have had access to some Italian works in Germany, but the two visits he made to Italy had an enormous influence on him. He wrote that Giovanni Bellini was the oldest and still the best of the artists in Venice. His drawings and engravings show the influence of others, notably Antonio del Pollaiuolo, with his interest in the proportions of the body; Lorenzo di Credi; and Andrea Mantegna, whose work he produced copies of while training. Dürer probably also visited Padua and Mantua on this trip. (Note: The evidence for this trip is not conclusive; the suggestion it happened is supported by Panofsky (1945) and is accepted by a majority of scholars, including the several curators of the large 2020–22 exhibition "Dürer's Journeys", but it has been disputed by other scholars, including Katherine Crawford Luber (in her Albrecht Dürer and the Venetian Renaissance, 2005).)

=== Return to Nuremberg (1495–1505) ===
On his return to Nuremberg in 1495, Dürer opened his own workshop (being married was a requirement for this). Over the next five years, his style increasingly integrated Italian influences into underlying Northern forms. Arguably his best works in the first years of the workshop were his woodcut prints, mostly religious, but including secular scenes such as The Men's Bath (c. 1496). These were larger and more finely cut than the great majority of German woodcuts hitherto, and far more complex and balanced in composition.

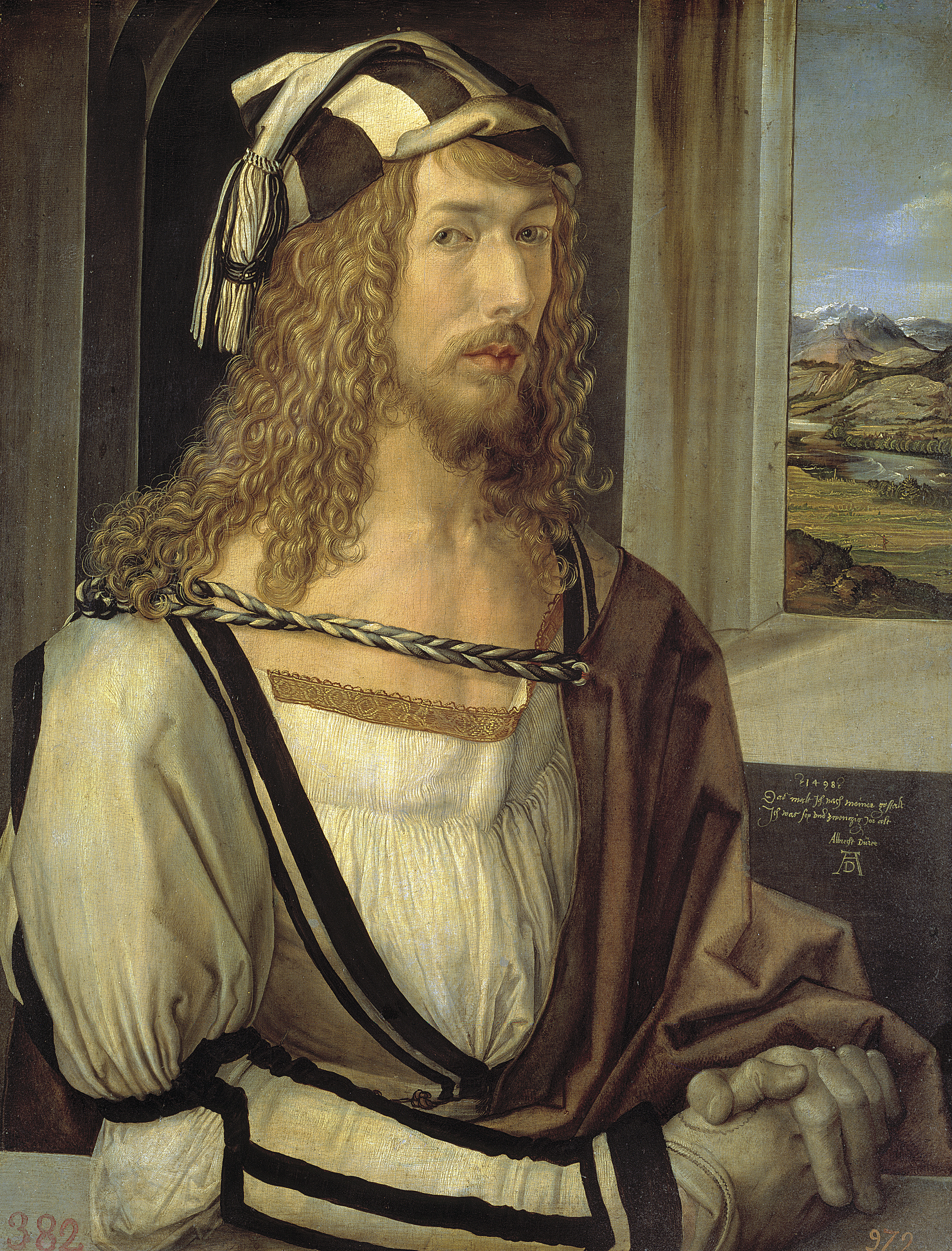
Dürer's Self-Portrait at 26, 1498, Prado, Madrid

It is now thought unlikely that Dürer cut any of the woodblocks himself; this task would have been performed by a specialist craftsman. However, his training in Wolgemut's studio, which made many carved and painted altarpieces and both designed and cut woodblocks for woodcut, evidently gave him great understanding of what the technique could be made to produce, and how to work with block cutters. Dürer either drew his design directly onto the woodblock itself, or glued a paper drawing to the block. Either way, his drawings were destroyed during the cutting of the block.

His series of sixteen designs for the Apocalypse is dated 1498, as is his engraving of St. Michael Fighting the Dragon. He made the first seven scenes of the Great Passion in the same year, and a little later, a series of eleven on the Holy Family and saints. The Seven Sorrows Polyptych, commissioned by Frederick III of Saxony in 1496, was executed by Dürer and his assistants c. 1500. In 1502, Dürer's father died. Around 1503–1505 Dürer produced the first 17 of a set illustrating the Life of the Virgin, which he did not finish for some years. Neither these nor the Great Passion were published as sets until several years later, but prints were sold individually in considerable numbers.

During the same period Dürer perfected the difficult art of using the burin to make engravings. Most likely he had learned this skill during his early training with his father, as it was also an essential skill of the goldsmith. In 1496 he executed the Prodigal Son, which the Italian Renaissance art historian Giorgio Vasari singled out for praise some decades later, noting its Germanic quality. He was soon producing some spectacular and original images, notably Nemesis (1502), The Sea Monster (1498), and Saint Eustace (c. 1501), with a highly detailed landscape background and animals. His landscapes of this period, such as Pond in the Woods and Willow Mill, are quite different from his earlier watercolours. There is a much greater emphasis on capturing atmosphere, rather than depicting topography. He made a number of Madonnas, single religious figures, and small scenes with comic peasant figures. Prints are highly portable and these works made Dürer famous throughout the main artistic centres of Europe within a very few years.

The Venetian artist Jacopo de' Barbari, whom Dürer had met in Venice, visited Nuremberg in 1500, and Dürer said that he learned much about the new developments in perspective, anatomy, and proportion from him. To Dürer it seemed that De' Barbari was unwilling to explain everything he knew, so he began his own studies, which would become a lifelong preoccupation. A series of extant drawings show Dürer's experiments in human proportion, leading to the famous engraving of Adam and Eve (1504), which shows his subtlety while using the burin in the texturing of flesh surfaces. This is the only existing engraving signed with his full name.

Dürer created large numbers of preparatory drawings, especially for his paintings and engravings, and many survive, most famously the Betende Hände (Praying Hands) from circa 1508, a study for an apostle in the Heller altarpiece. He continued to make images in watercolour and bodycolour (usually combined), including a number of still lifes of meadow sections or animals, including his Young Hare (1502) and the Great Piece of Turf (1503).

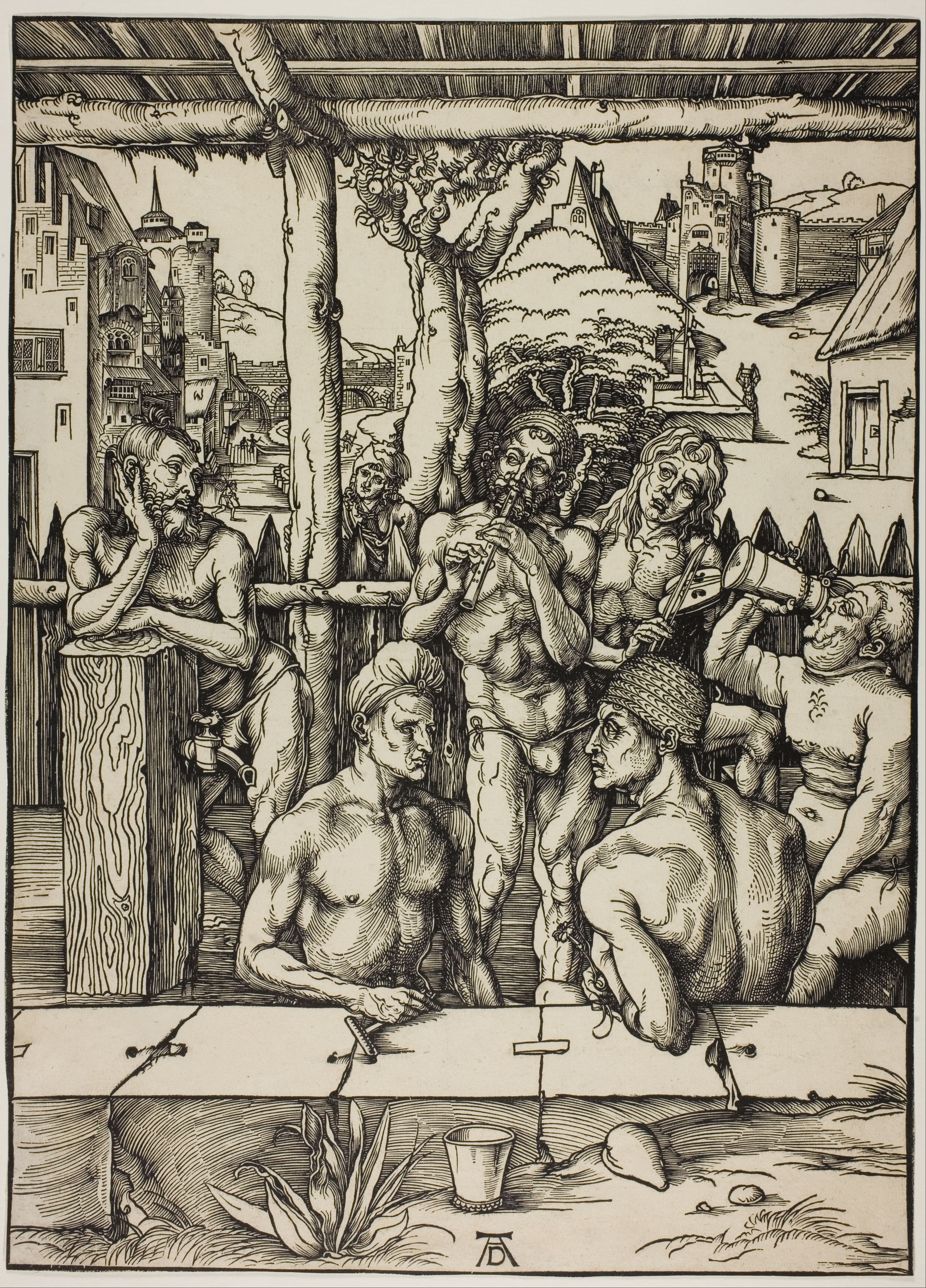
The Men's Bath, c. 1496, woodcut, 39.2 × 28.3 cm (Art Institute of Chicago)

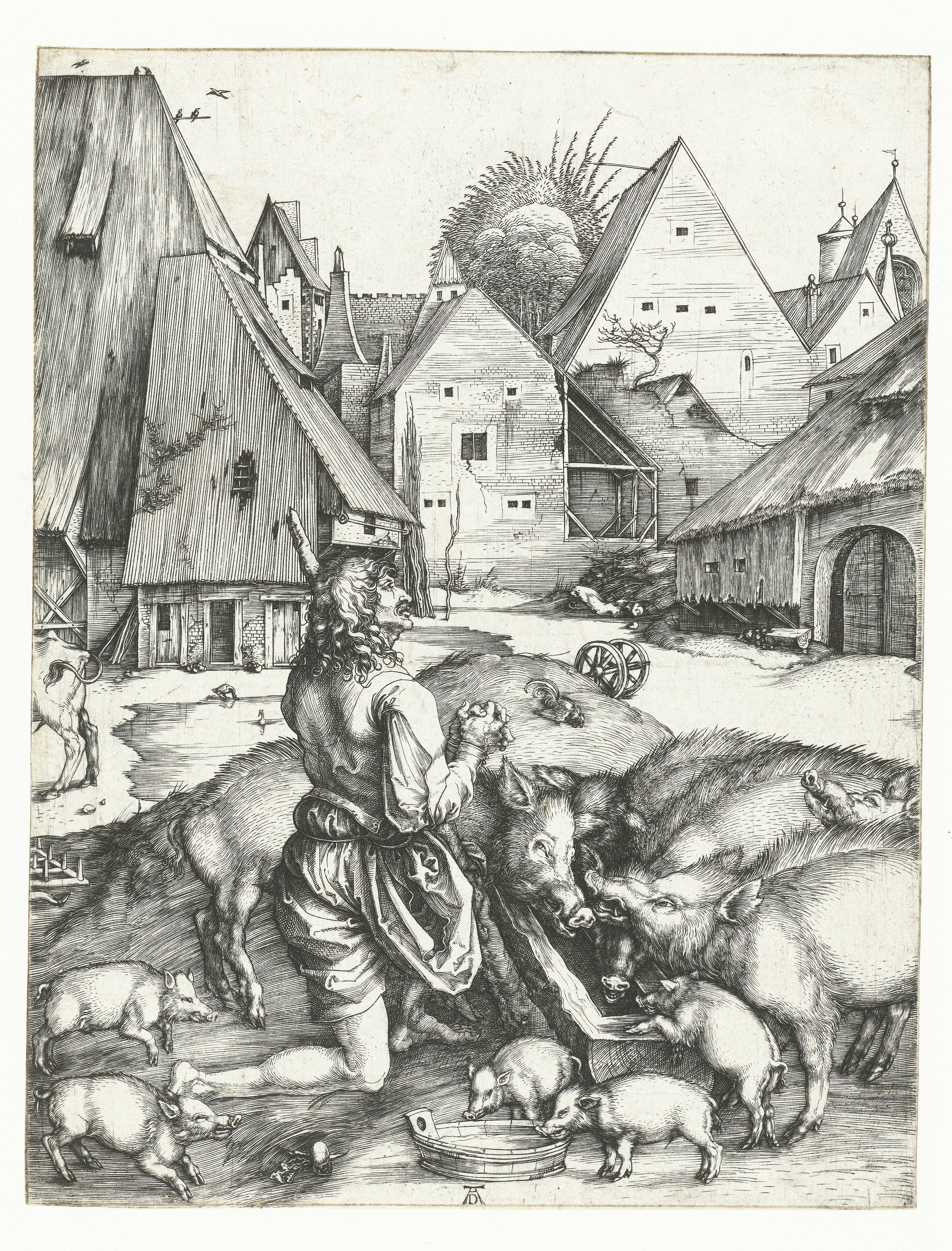
The Prodigal Son, 1496, copper engraving, 24.7 × 19.1 cm (Rijksmuseum, Amsterdam)

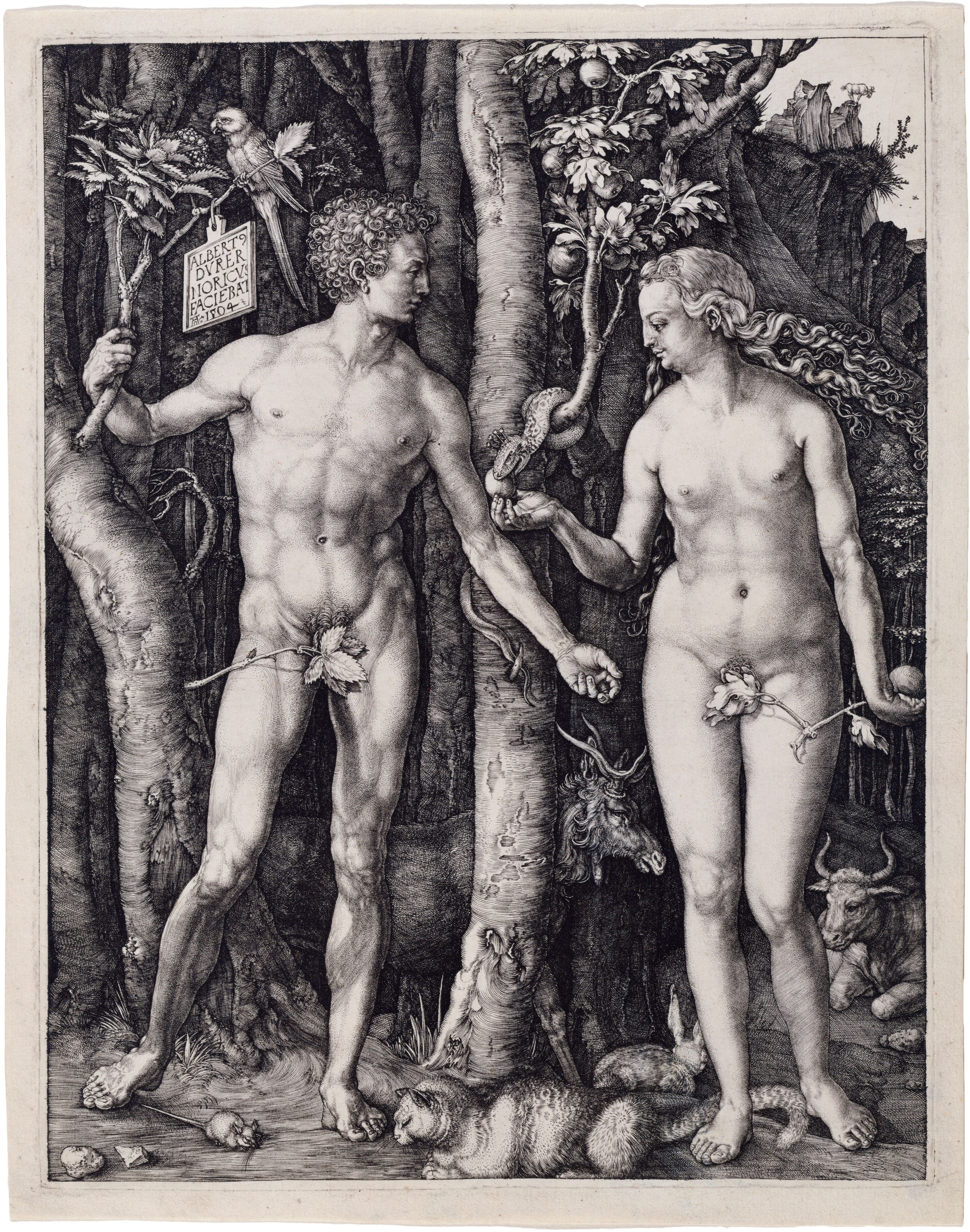
Adam and Eve, 1504, copper engraving, 29.8 × 21.1 cm (Morgan Library & Museum, New York)

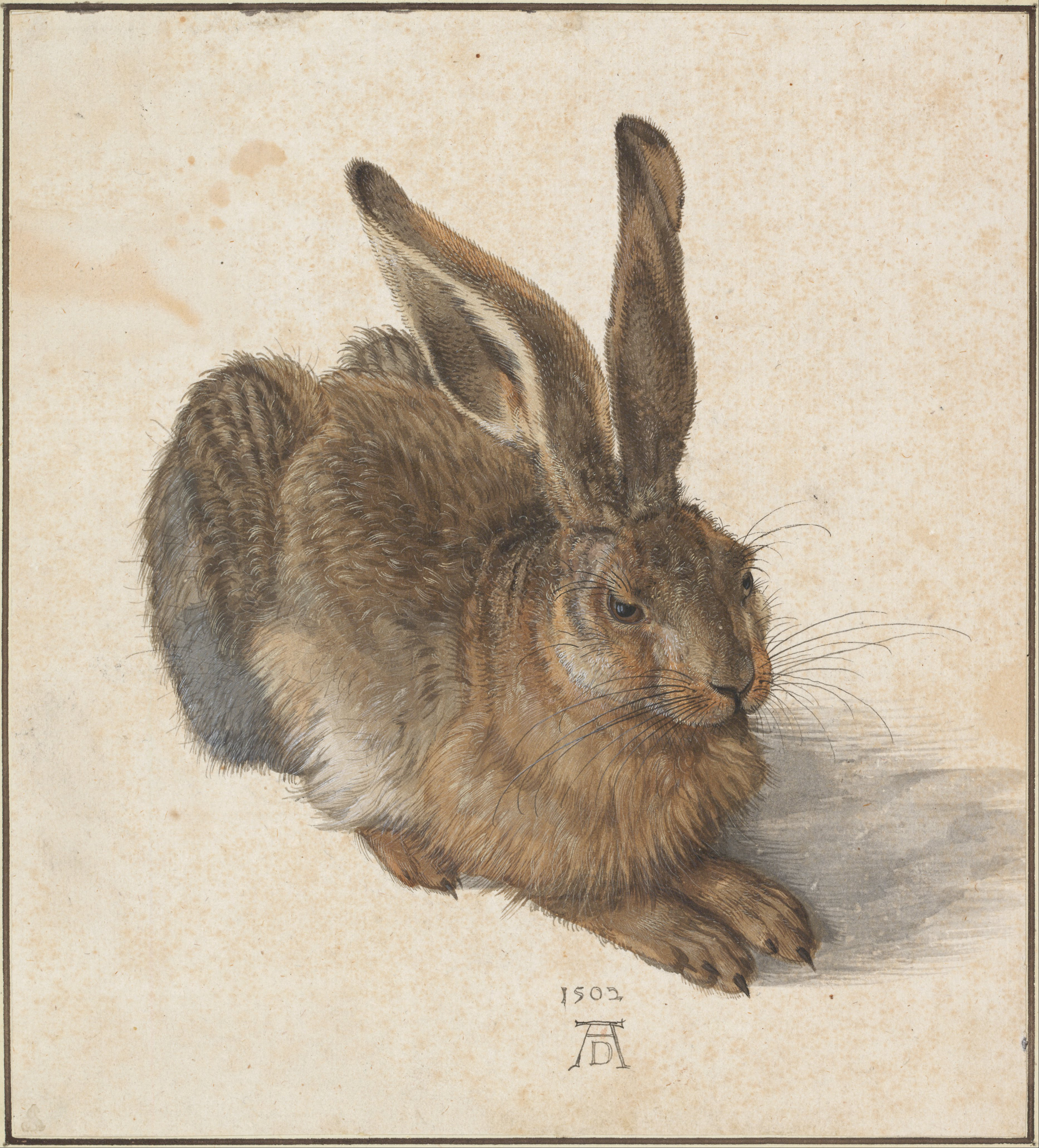
Young Hare, 1502, watercolour and gouache, 25 × 22.5 cm (Albertina, Vienna)

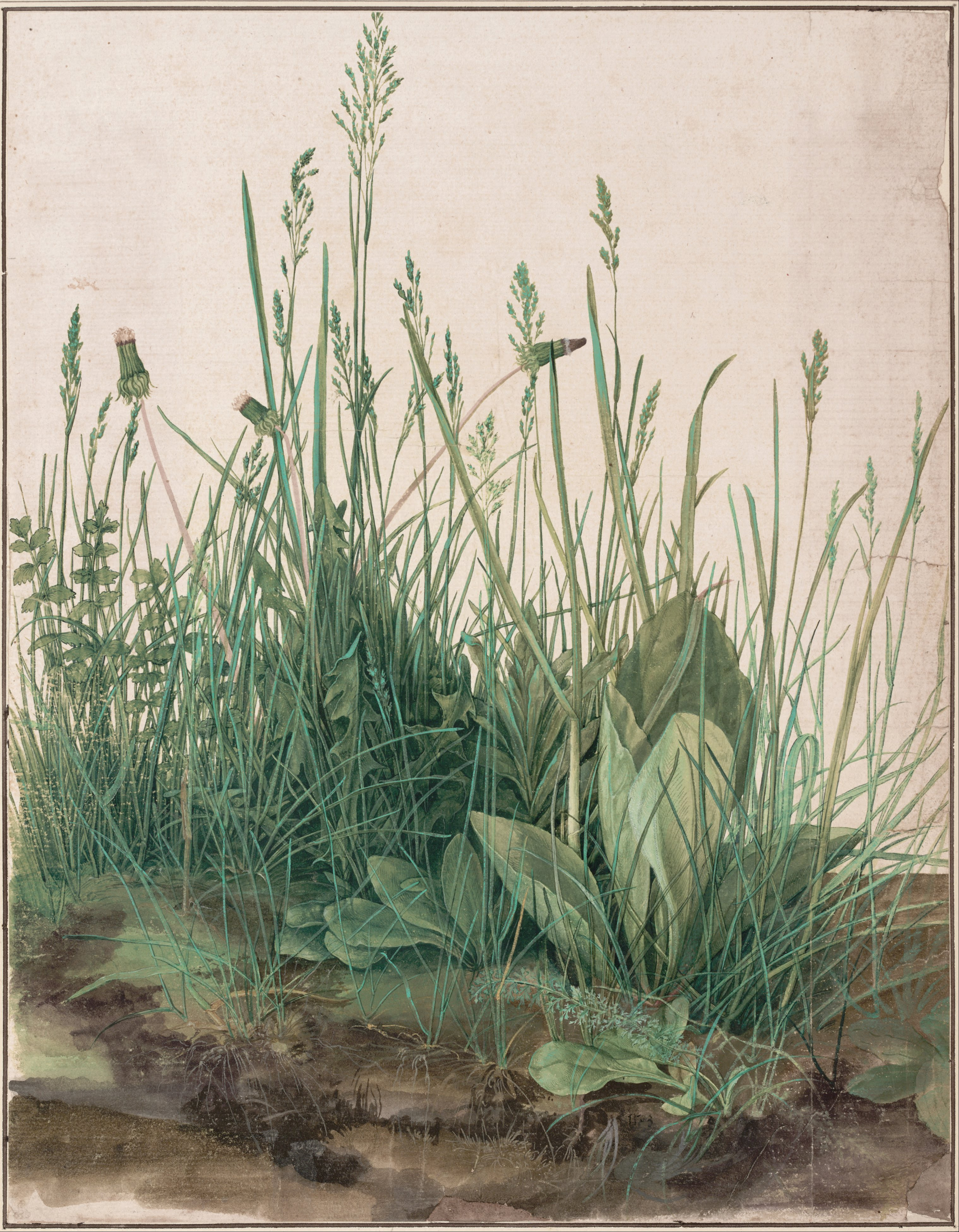
Large Piece of Turf, 1503, watercolour and gouache w/highlighting, 40,8 × 31,5 cm (Albertina)

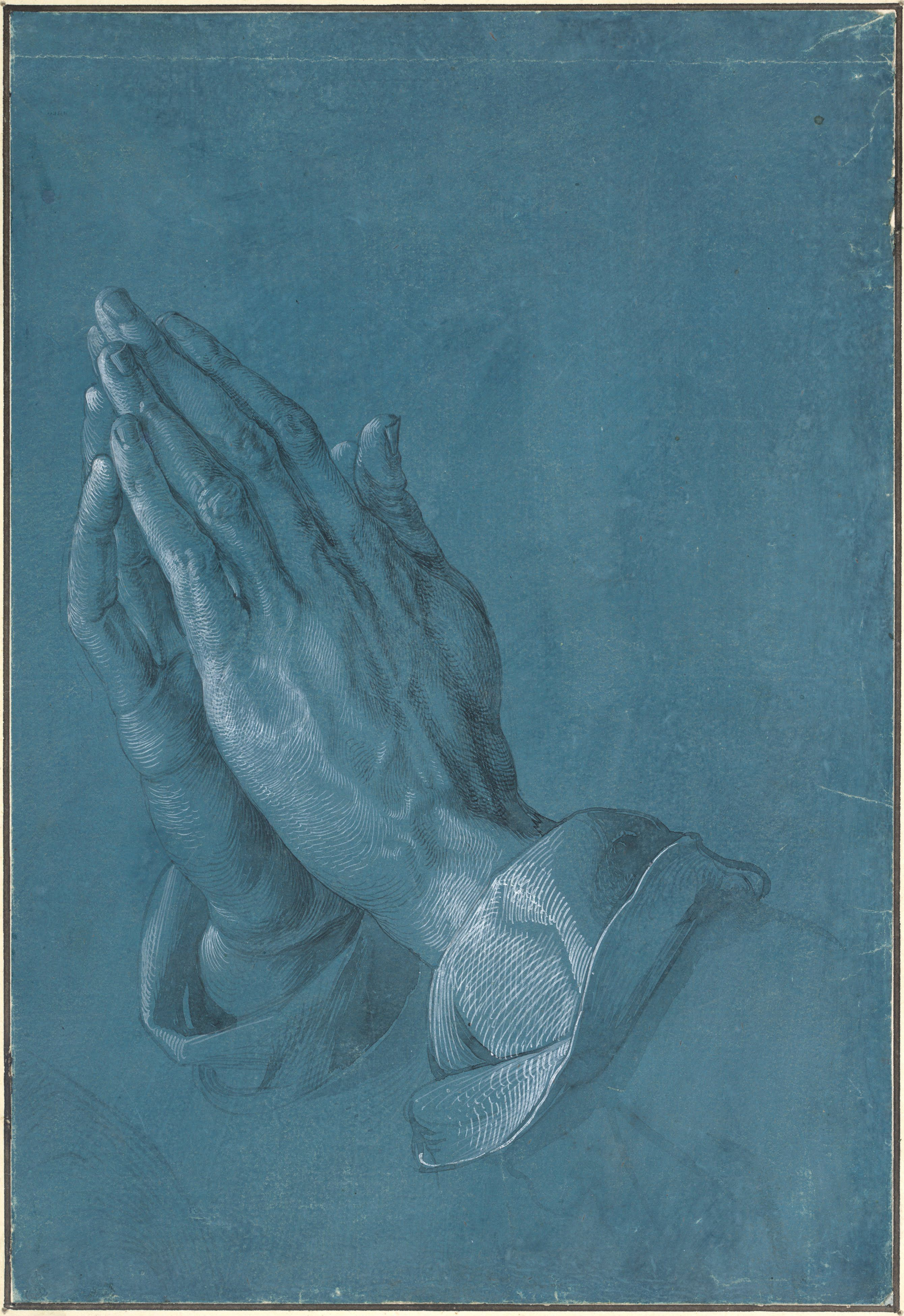
Praying Hands, c. 1508, brush, ink and gray wash on blue paper, 29.1 × 19.7 cm (Albertina)

=== Second journey to Italy (1505–1507) ===
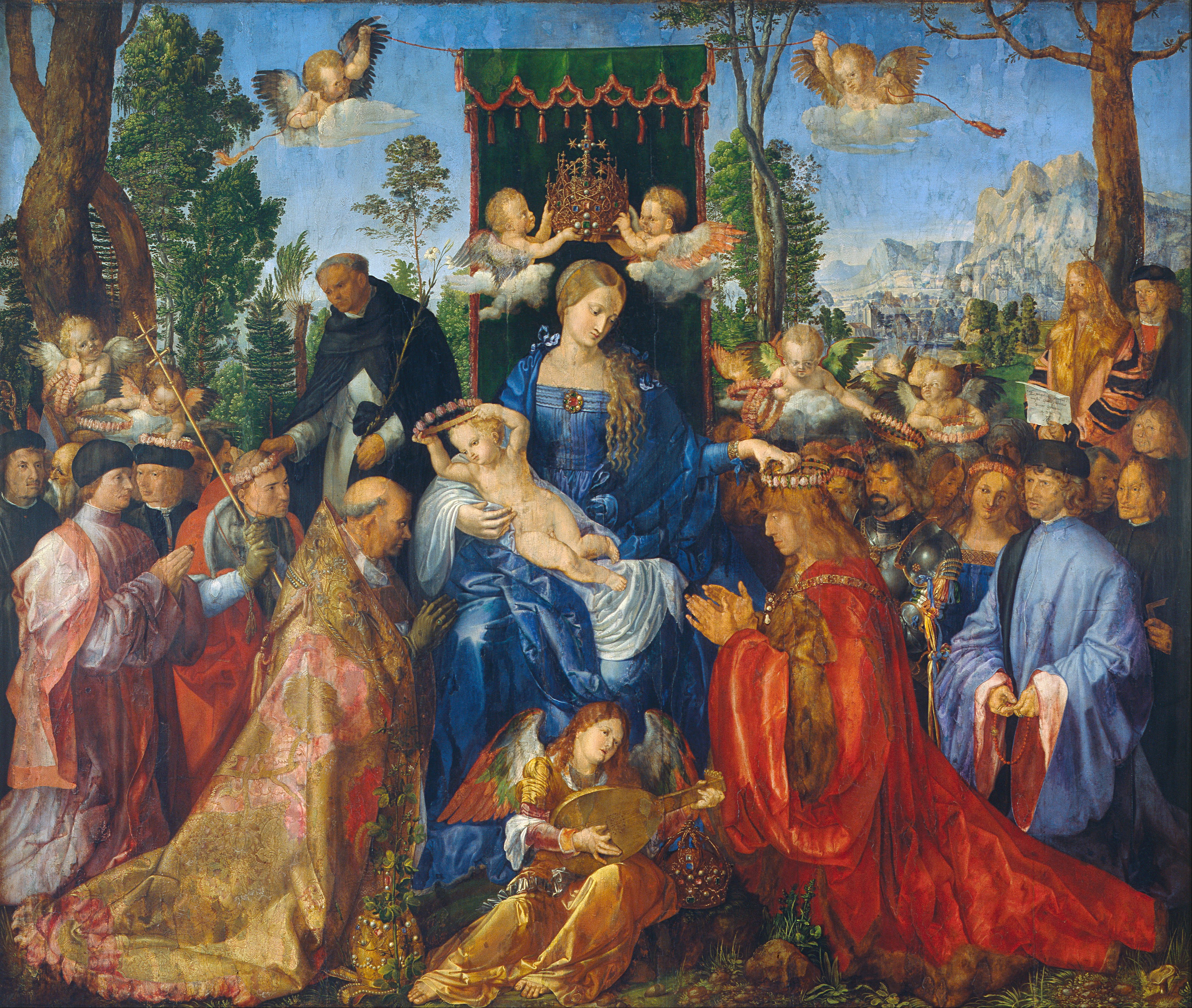
Feast of the Rosary, 1506, oil on panel, 162 × 192 cm, National Gallery Prague

In Italy, he returned to painting, at first producing a series of works executed in tempera on linen. These include portraits and altarpieces, notably, the Paumgartner altarpiece and the Adoration of the Magi. In early 1506, he returned to Venice and stayed there until the spring of 1507. It was in Venice that he took up the material of blue paper, which he used to execute preparatory drawing for paintings he completed there in 1505–1507. By this time Dürer's engravings had attained great popularity and were being copied. In Venice he was given a valuable commission from the emigrant German community for the church of San Bartolomeo. This was the altar-piece known as the Feast of the Rosary (or the Feast of Rose Garlands). It shows Pope Julius II and Emperor Maximilian I, peacefully kneeling in adoration before her throne, both with their crowns taken off. It also includes portraits of members of Venice's German community and of Dürer himself on the upper right holding a designation of his authorship. Besides the Flemish verism in the depiction of the greenery and the garments, and the use of his own hues, the altar-piece shows a strong Italian influence. It was later acquired by the Emperor Rudolf II and taken to Prague.

=== Nuremberg and the masterworks (1507–1520) ===
Dürer returned to Nuremberg by mid-1507, remaining in Germany until 1520. His reputation had spread throughout Europe and he was on friendly terms and in communication with many of the major artists including Raphael. (Note: According to Vasari, Dürer sent Raphael a self-portrait in watercolour, and Raphael sent back multiple drawings. One is dated 1515 and has an inscription by Dürer (or one of his heirs) affirming that Raphael sent it to him. See Salmi, Mario; Becherucci, Luisa; Marabottini, Alessandro; Tempesti, Anna Forlani; Marchini, Giuseppe; Becatti, Giovanni; Castagnoli, Ferdinando; Golzio, Vincenzo (1969). The Complete Work of Raphael. New York: Reynal and Co., William Morrow and Company. pp. 278, 407. Dürer describes Giovanni Bellini as "very old, but still the best in painting".) Between 1507 and 1511 Dürer worked on some of his most celebrated paintings: Adam and Eve (1507), Martyrdom of the Ten Thousand (1508, for Frederick of Saxony), Virgin with the Iris (1508), the altarpiece Assumption of the Virgin (1509, for Jacob Heller of Frankfurt), and Adoration of the Trinity (1511, for Matthaeus Landauer). During this period he also completed two woodcut series, the Great Passion and the Life of the Virgin, both published in 1511 together with a second edition of the Apocalypse series. The post-Venetian woodcuts show Dürer's development of chiaroscuro modelling effects, creating a mid-tone throughout the print to which the highlights and shadows can be contrasted.

Other works from this period include the thirty-seven Little Passion woodcuts, published in 1511, and a set of fifteen small engravings on the same theme in 1512. Complaining that painting did not make enough money to justify the time spent when compared to his prints, he produced no paintings from 1513 to 1516. In 1513 and 1514 Dürer created his three most famous engravings: Knight, Death and the Devil (1513, probably based on Erasmus's Handbook of a Christian Knight), St. Jerome in His Study, and the much-debated Melencolia I (both 1514, the year Dürer's mother died). (Note: In March of this year, two months before his mother died, he drew a portrait of her.) Further outstanding pen and ink drawings of Dürer's period of artwork of 1513 were drafts for his friend Pirckheimer. These drafts were later used to design Lusterweibchen chandeliers, combining an antler with a wooden sculpture.

In 1515, Dürer created his woodcut of a rhinoceros. It had arrived in Lisbon from a written description and sketch by another artist; Dürer never saw the animal himself. An image of the Indian rhinoceros, the image has such force that it remains one of his best-known and was still used in some German school science textbooks as late as the last century. In the years leading to 1520 he produced a wide range of works, including the woodblocks for the first western printed star charts in 1515 and portraits in tempera on linen in 1516. His only experiments with etching came in this period, producing five between 1515 and 1516 and a sixth in 1518, a technique that he may have abandoned as unsuited to his aesthetic of methodical, classical form.

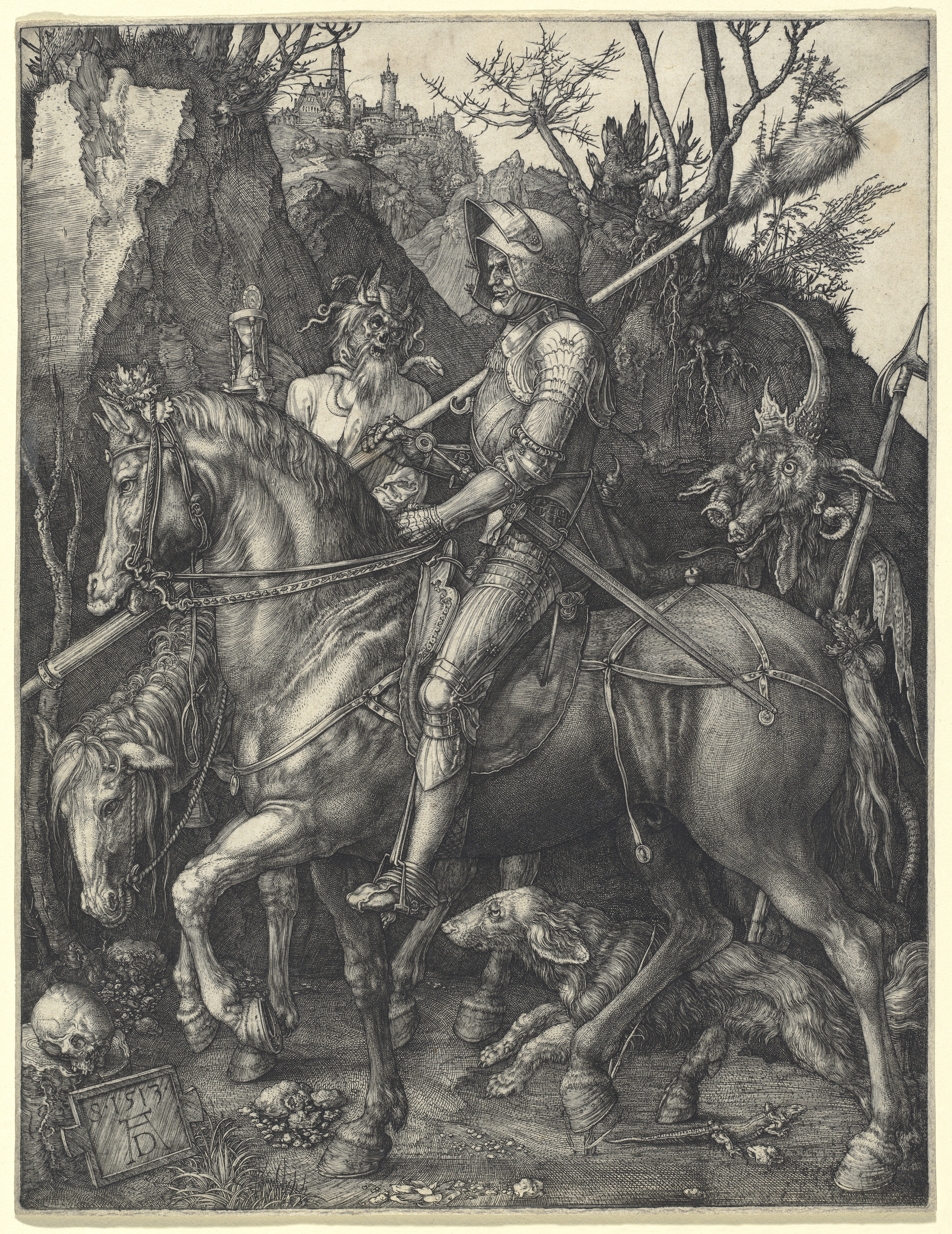
Knight, Death and the Devil, 1513,

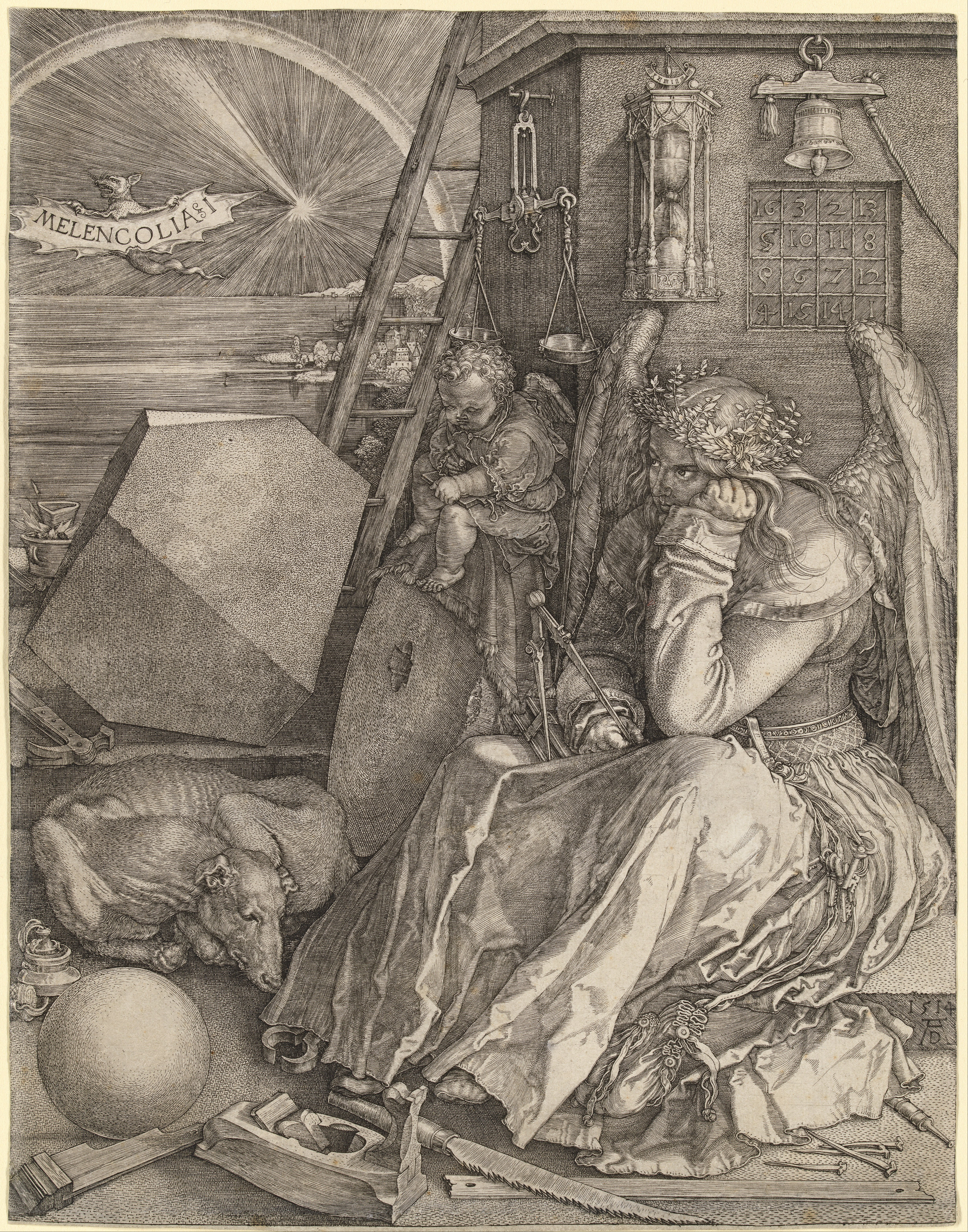
Melencolia I, 1514

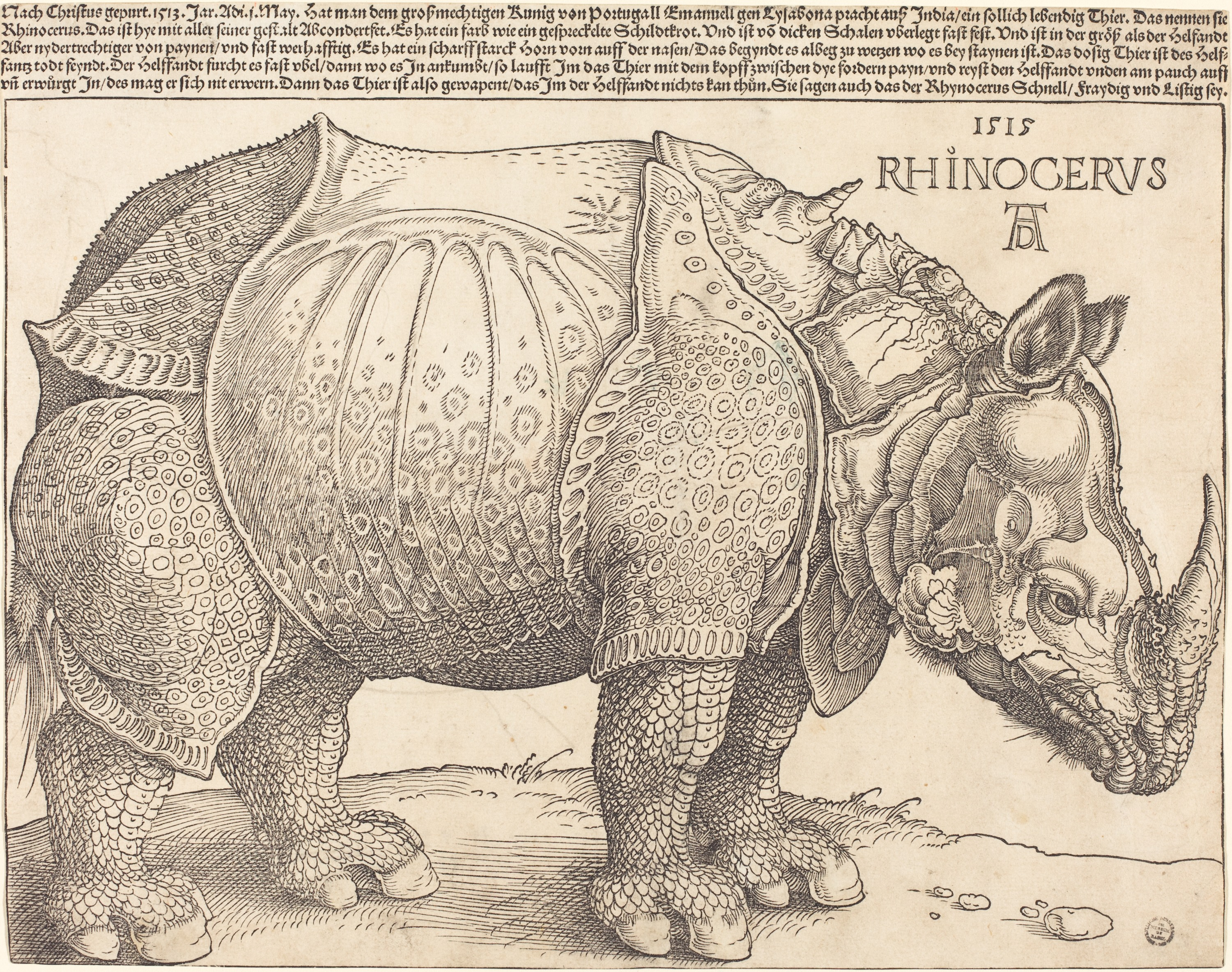
Rhinoceros, 1515

==== Patronage of Maximilian I ====
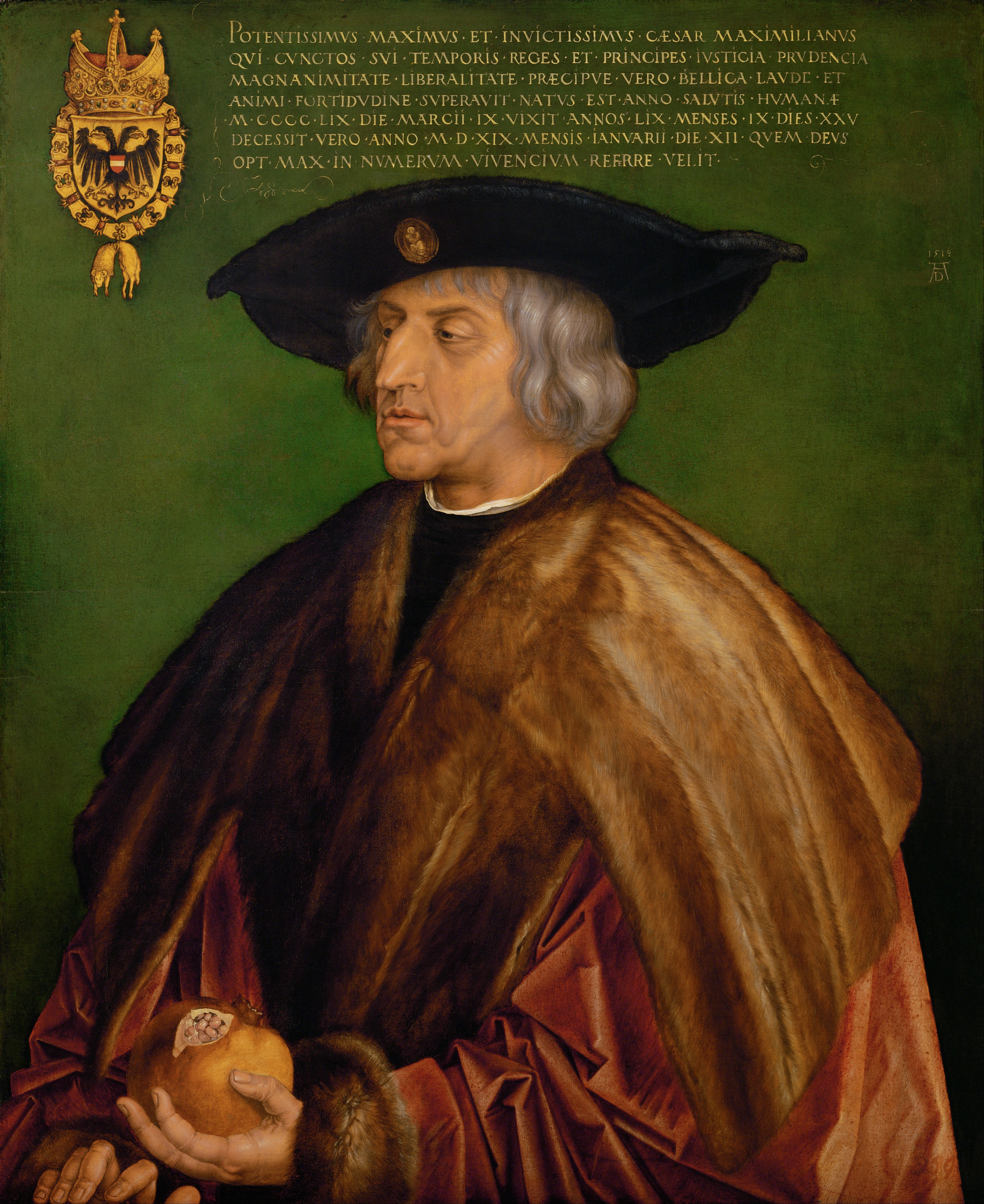
Portrait of Maximilian I, 1519, oil on lime wood, 74 × 61,5 cm, Kunsthistorisches Museum, Vienna (Inv. GG 825)

From 1512, Maximilian I became Dürer's major patron. He commissioned The Triumphal Arch, a vast work printed from 192 separate blocks, the symbolism of which is partly informed by Pirckheimer's translation of Horapollo's Hieroglyphica. The design program and explanations were devised by Johannes Stabius, the architectural design by the master builder and court-painter Jörg Kölderer and the woodcutting itself by Hieronymous Andreae, with Dürer as designer-in-chief. The Arch was followed by The Triumphal Procession completed c. 1512.

Dürer worked with pen on the marginal images for an edition of the Emperor's printed prayer book; these were quite unknown until facsimiles were published in 1808 as part of the first book published in lithography. Dürer's work on the book was halted for an unknown reason, and the decoration was continued by artists including Lucas Cranach the Elder and Hans Baldung. Dürer also made several portraits of the Emperor, including one shortly before Maximilian's death in 1519.

Maximilian was a very cash-strapped prince who sometimes failed to pay, yet turned out to be Dürer's most important patron. In his court, artists and learned men were respected, which was not common at that time (later, Dürer commented that in Germany, as a non-noble, he was treated as a parasite). Pirckheimer (whom he met in 1495, before entering the service of Maximilian) was also an important personage in the court and great cultural patron, who had a strong influence on Dürer as his tutor in classical knowledge and humanistic critical methodology, as well as collaborator. In Maximilian's court, Dürer also collaborated with a great number of other brilliant artists and scholars of the time who became his friends, like Johannes Stabius, Konrad Peutinger, Conrad Celtes, and Hans Tscherte (an imperial architect).

Dürer was proud of his ability. When the emperor tried to sketch Dürer an idea on charcoal, Dürer took the material from Maximilian's hand, finished the drawing and told him: "This is my scepter." On another occasion, Maximilian noticed that the ladder Dürer used was too short and unstable, thus told a noble to hold it for him. The noble refused, saying that it was beneath him to serve a non-noble. Maximilian then came to hold the ladder himself, and told the noble that he could make a noble out of a peasant any day, but he could not make an artist like Dürer out of a noble.

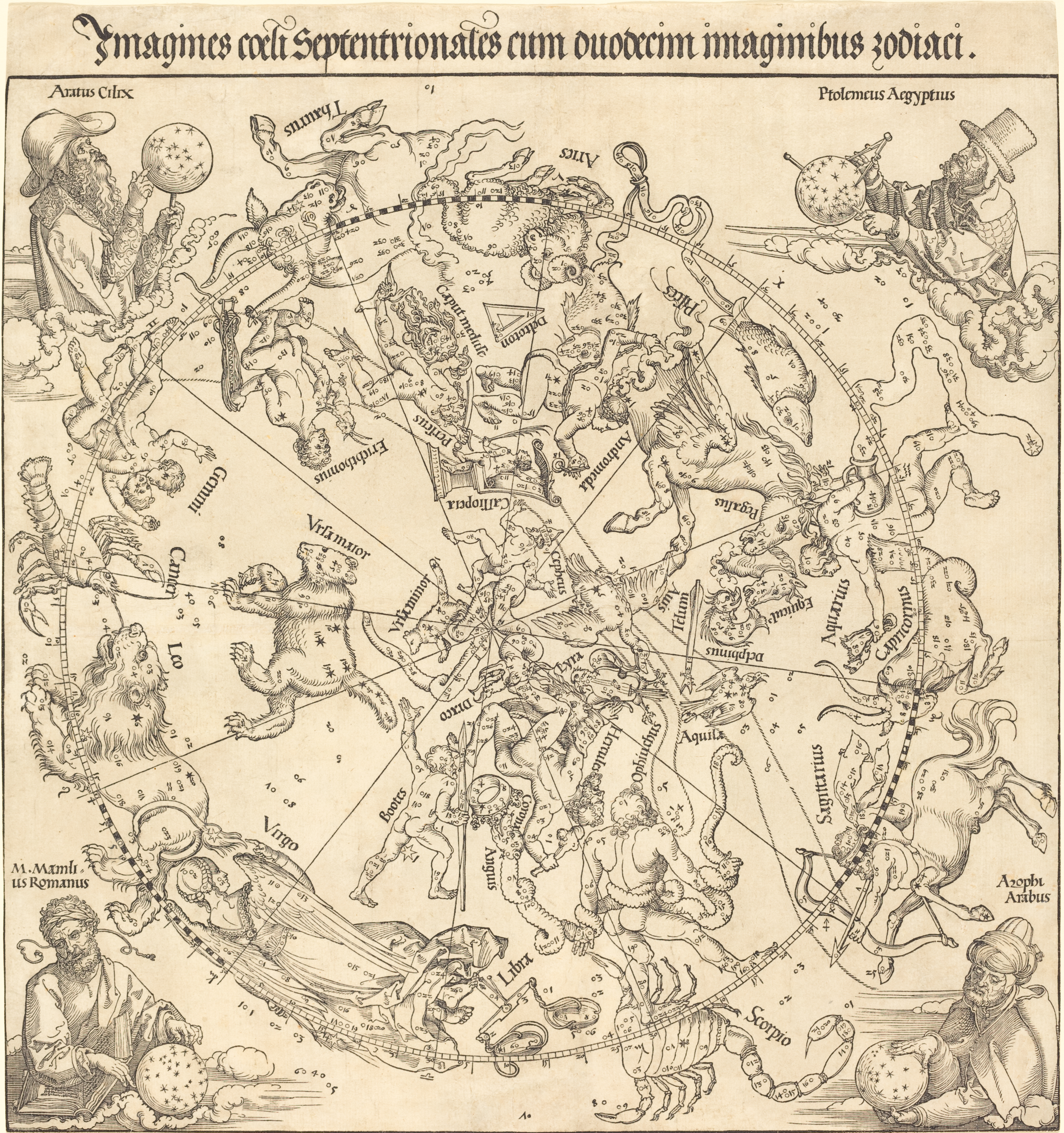
The Northern Hemisphere of the Celestial Globe, 1515, woodcut print, 61.3 × 45.6 cm (National Gallery of Art)

This story and a 1849 painting depicting it by August Siegert have become relevant recently. This nineteenth-century painting shows Dürer painting a mural at St. Stephen's Cathedral, Vienna. Apparently, this reflects a seventeenth-century "artists' legend" about the previously mentioned encounter (in which the emperor held the ladder) – that this encounter corresponds with the period Dürer was working on the Viennese murals. In 2020, during restoration work, art connoisseurs discovered a piece of handwriting now attributed to Dürer, suggesting that the Nuremberg master had actually participated in creating the murals at St. Stephen's Cathedral. In the 2022 Dürer exhibition in Nuremberg (in which the drawing technique is also traced and connected to Dürer's other works), the identity of the commissioner is discussed. Now the painting of Siegert (and the legend associated with it) is used as evidence to suggest that this was Maximilian. Dürer is historically recorded to have entered the emperor's service in 1511, and the mural's date is calculated to be around 1505, but it is possible they have known and worked with each other earlier than 1511.

==== Cartographic and astronomical works ====
Dürer's exploration of space led to a relationship and cooperation with the court astronomer Johannes Stabius. Stabius also often acted as Dürer's and Maximilian's go-between for their financial problems.

In 1515 Dürer and Stabius created the first world map projected on a solid geometric sphere. Also in 1515, Stabius, Dürer and the astronomer Konrad Heinfogel produced the first planispheres of both southern and northerns hemispheres, as well as the first printed celestial maps, which prompted the revival of interest in the field of uranometry throughout Europe.

=== Journey to the Netherlands (1520–1521) ===
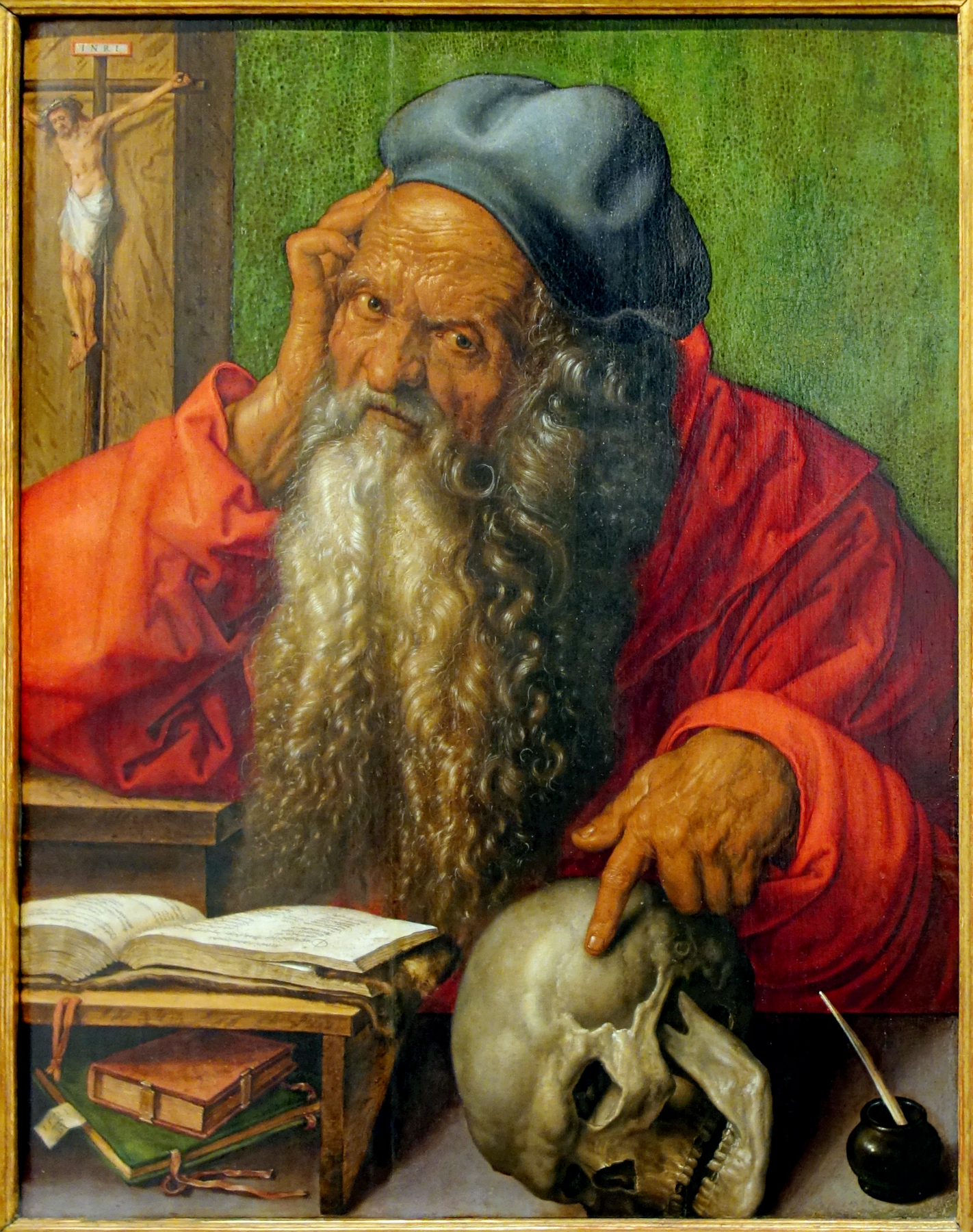
St. Jerome in His Study, 1521, Museu Nacional de Arte Antiga, Lisbon. Dürer's most important painting created during his fourth and last major journey.

Maximilian's death came at a time when Dürer was concerned he was losing "my sight and freedom of hand" (perhaps caused by arthritis) and increasingly affected by the writings of Martin Luther. In July 1520 Dürer made his fourth and last major journey, to renew the Imperial pension Maximilian had given him and to secure the patronage of the new emperor, Charles V, who was to be crowned at Aachen. Dürer journeyed with his wife and her maid via the Rhine to Cologne and then to Antwerp, where he was well received and produced numerous drawings in silverpoint, chalk and charcoal. In addition to attending the coronation, he visited Cologne (where he admired the painting of Stefan Lochner), Nijmegen, 's-Hertogenbosch, Bruges (where he saw Michelangelo's Madonna of Bruges), Ghent (where he saw Jan van Eyck's Ghent Altarpiece), and Zeeland.

Dürer took a large stock of prints with him and wrote in his diary to whom he gave, exchanged or sold them, and for how much. This provides rare information of the monetary value placed on prints at this time. Unlike paintings, their sale was very rarely documented. While providing valuable documentary evidence, Dürer's Netherlandish diary also reveals that the trip was not a profitable one. For example, Dürer offered his last portrait of Maximilian to his daughter, Margaret of Austria, but eventually traded the picture for some white cloth after Margaret disliked the portrait and declined to accept it. During this trip he also met Bernard van Orley, Jan Provoost, Gerard Horenbout, Jean Mone, Joachim Patinir and Tommaso Vincidor, though he did not, it seems, meet Quentin Matsys.

Having secured his pension, Dürer returned home in July 1521, having caught an undetermined illness, which afflicted him for the rest of his life, and greatly reduced his rate of work.

=== Final years, Nuremberg (1521–1528) ===
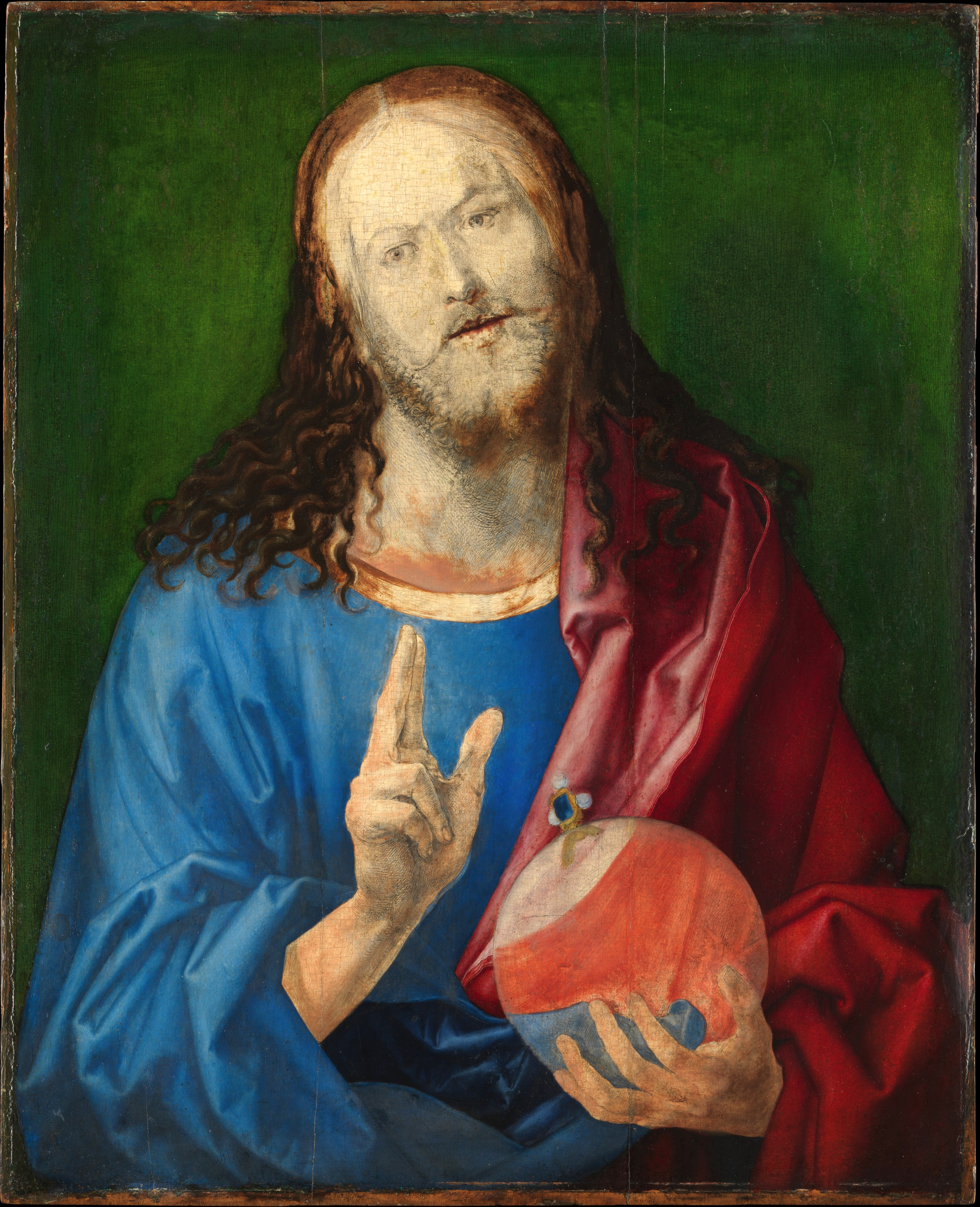
Salvator Mundi, unfinished oil painting on linden wood, 58.1 × 47 cm, Metropolitan Museum of Art, New York

On his return to Nuremberg, Dürer worked on a number of grand projects with religious themes, including a crucifixion scene and a sacra conversazione, though neither was completed. This may have been due in part to his declining health, but perhaps also because of the time he gave to the preparation of his theoretical works on geometry and perspective, the proportions of men and horses, and fortification.

However, one consequence of this shift in emphasis was that during the last years of his life, Dürer produced comparatively little as an artist. In painting, there was only a portrait of Hieronymus Holtzschuher, a Madonna and Child (1526), Salvator Mundi (1526), and two panels showing St. John with St. Peter and St. Paul with St. Mark beside him. This last great work, The Four Apostles, was given by Dürer to the City of Nuremberg—although he was given 100 guilders in return.

As for engravings, Dürer's work was restricted to portraits and illustrations for his treatise. The portraits include his boyhood friend Willibald Pirckheimer, Cardinal-Elector Albert of Mainz; Frederick the Wise, elector of Saxony; Philipp Melanchthon, and Erasmus of Rotterdam. For those of the Cardinal, Melanchthon, and Dürer's final major work, a drawn portrait of the Nuremberg patrician Ulrich Starck, Dürer depicted the sitters in profile.

Despite complaining of his lack of a formal classical education, Dürer was greatly interested in intellectual matters and learned much from Willibald Pirckheimer, whom he no doubt consulted on the content of many of his images. He also derived great satisfaction from his friendships and correspondence with Erasmus and other scholars. Dürer succeeded in producing two books during his lifetime. The Four Books on Measurement were published at Nuremberg in 1525 and was the first book for adults on mathematics in German, as well as being cited later by Galileo and Kepler. The other, a work on city fortifications, was published in 1527. The Four Books on Human Proportion were published posthumously, shortly after his death in 1528.

Dürer died in Nuremberg at the age of 56, leaving an estate valued at 6,874 florins – a considerable sum. He is buried in the Johannisfriedhof cemetery. His large house (purchased in 1509 from the heirs of the astronomer Bernhard Walther), where his workshop was located and where his widow lived until her death in 1539, remains a prominent Nuremberg landmark.

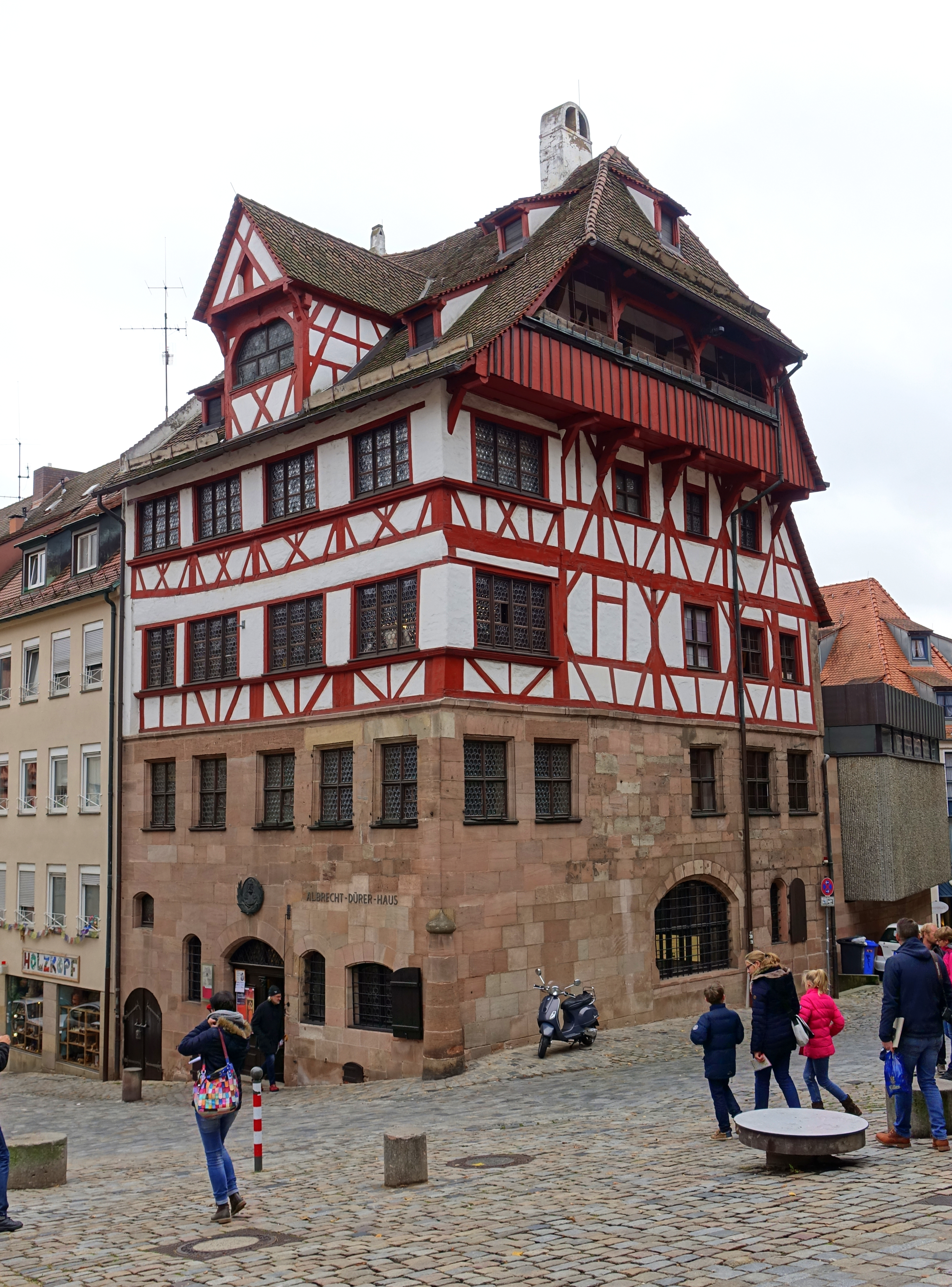
Albrecht Dürer's House in Nuremberg

==== Dürer and the Reformation ====
Dürer's writings suggest that he may have been sympathetic to Luther's ideas, though it is unclear if he ever left the Catholic Church. Dürer wrote of his desire to draw Luther in his diary in 1520: "And God help me that I may go to Dr. Martin Luther; thus I intend to make a portrait of him with great care and engrave him on a copper plate to create a lasting memorial of the Christian man who helped me overcome so many difficulties." In a letter to Nicholas Kratzer in 1524, Dürer wrote, "because of our Christian faith we have to stand in scorn and danger, for we are reviled and called heretics". Most tellingly, Pirckheimer wrote in a letter to Johann Tscherte in 1530: "I confess that in the beginning I believed in Luther, like our Albert of blessed memory ... but as anyone can see, the situation has become worse." Dürer may even have contributed to the Nuremberg City Council's mandating Lutheran sermons and services in March 1525. Notably, Dürer had contacts with various reformers, such as Zwingli, Andreas Karlstadt, Melanchthon, Erasmus and Cornelius Grapheus from whom Dürer received Luther's Babylonian Captivity in 1520. Yet Erasmus and C. Grapheus are better said to be Catholic change agents. Also, from 1525, "the year that saw the peak and collapse of the Peasants' War, the artist can be seen to distance himself somewhat from the [Lutheran] movement..."

However, Dürer's later works have also been claimed to show Protestant sympathies. His 1523 woodcut of The Last Supper has often been understood to have an evangelical theme, focusing as it does on Christ espousing the Gospel, as well as the inclusion of the Eucharistic cup, perhaps alluding to tenets of Protestant utraquism, although this interpretation has been questioned. The delaying of the engraving of St. Philip, completed in 1523 but not distributed until 1526, may have been due to Dürer's uneasiness with images of saints; even if Dürer was not an iconoclast, in his last years he evaluated and questioned the role of art in religion.

== Theoretical works ==
In all his theoretical works, in order to communicate his theories in the German language rather than in Latin, Dürer used graphic expressions based on a vernacular, craftsmen's language. For example, Schneckenlinie ("snail-line") was his term for a spiral form. Thus, Dürer contributed to the expansion in German prose which Luther had begun with his translation of the Bible.

=== Four Books on Measurement ===
Dürer's work on geometry is called the Four Books on Measurement (Underweysung der Messung mit dem Zirckel und Richtscheyt or Instructions for Measuring with Compass and Ruler). The first book focuses on linear geometry. Dürer's geometric constructions include helices, conchoids and epicycloids. He also draws on Apollonius, and Johannes Werner's Libellus super viginti duobus elementis conicis of 1522.

The second book moves onto two-dimensional geometry, i.e. the construction of regular polygons. Here Dürer favours the methods of Ptolemy over Euclid. The third book applies these principles of geometry to architecture, engineering and typography. In architecture Dürer cites Vitruvius but elaborates his own classical designs and columns. In typography, Dürer depicts the geometric construction of the Latin alphabet, relying on Italian precedent. However, his construction of the Gothic alphabet is based upon an entirely different modular system. The fourth book completes the progression of the first and second by moving to three-dimensional forms and the construction of polyhedra. Here Dürer discusses the five Platonic solids, as well as seven Archimedean semi-regular solids, and several of his own invention.

=== Four Books on Human Proportion ===
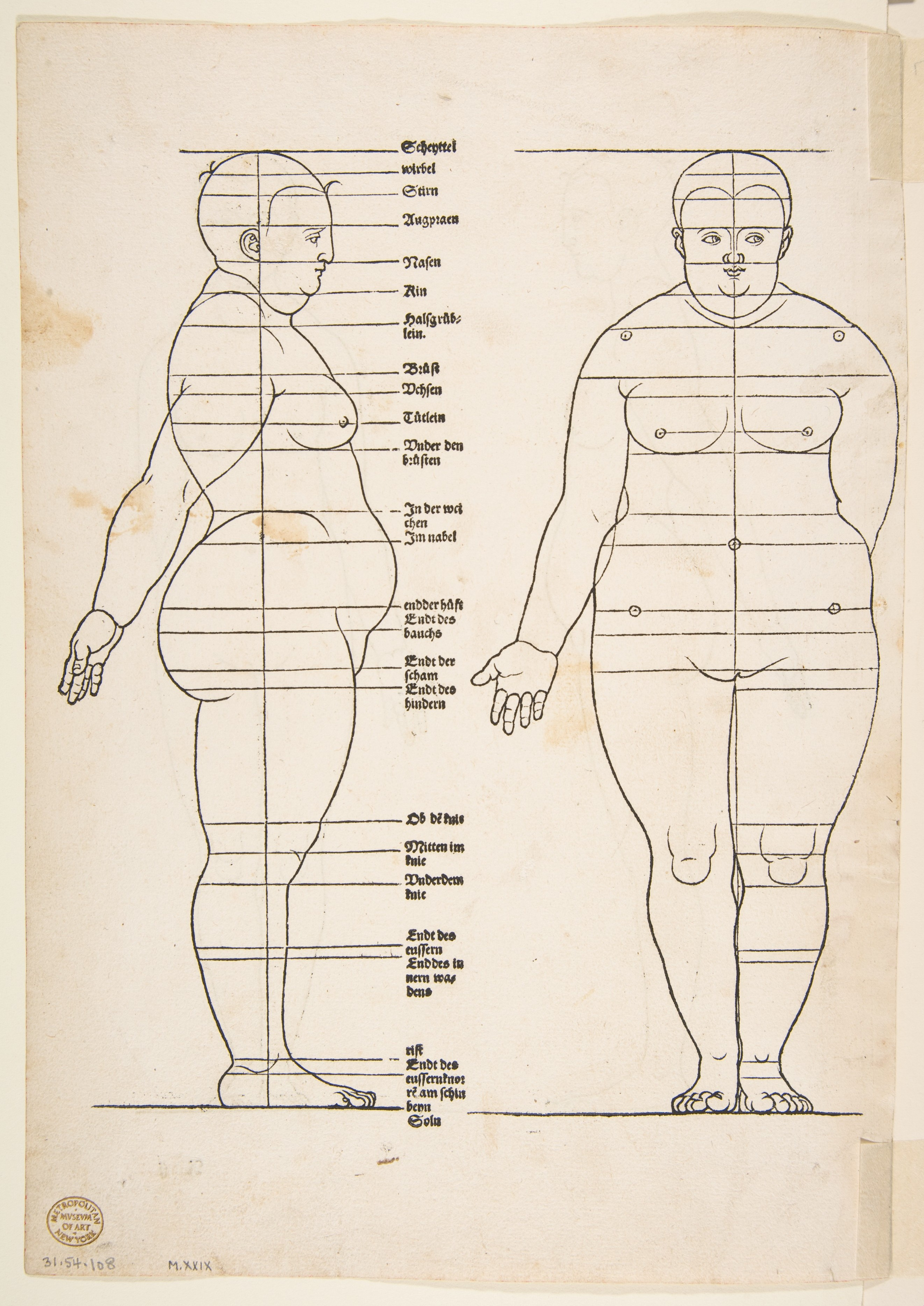
Illustration from the Four Books on Human Proportion, 1528 (MET, New York)

Dürer's work on human proportions is called the Four Books on Human Proportion (Vier Bücher von menschlicher Proportion) of 1528. The first book was mainly composed by 1512/13 and completed by 1523, showing five differently constructed types of both male and female figures, all parts of the body expressed in fractions of the total height. Dürer based these constructions on both Vitruvius and empirical observations of "two to three hundred living persons", in his own words. The second book includes eight further types, broken down not into fractions but an Albertian system, which Dürer probably learned from Francesco di Giorgio's De harmonica mundi totius of 1525. In the third book, Dürer gives principles by which the proportions of the figures can be modified, including the mathematical simulation of convex and concave mirrors; here Dürer also deals with human physiognomy. The fourth book is devoted to the theory of movement.

Appended to the last book, however, is a self-contained essay on aesthetics, which Dürer worked on between 1512 and 1528, and it is here that we learn of his theories concerning 'ideal beauty'. Dürer rejected Alberti's concept of an objective beauty, proposing a relativist notion of beauty based on variety. Nonetheless, Dürer still believed that truth was hidden within nature, and that there were rules which ordered beauty, even though he found it difficult to define the criteria for such a code. In 1512/13 his three criteria were function ("Nutz"), naïve approval ("Wohlgefallen") and the happy medium ("Mittelmass"). However, unlike Alberti and Leonardo, Dürer was most troubled by understanding not just the abstract notions of beauty but also as to how an artist can create beautiful images. Between 1512 and the final draft in 1528, Dürer's belief developed from an understanding of human creativity as spontaneous or inspired to a concept of 'selective inward synthesis'. In other words, that an artist builds on a wealth of visual experiences in order to imagine beautiful things. Dürer's belief in the abilities of a single artist over inspiration prompted him to assert that "one man may sketch something with his pen on half a sheet of paper in one day, or may cut it into a tiny piece of wood with his little iron, and it turns out to be better and more artistic than another's work at which its author labours with the utmost diligence for a whole year".

=== Book on Fortification ===
In 1527, Dürer also published Various Lessons on the Fortification of Cities, Castles, and Localities (Etliche Underricht zu Befestigung der Stett, Schloss und Flecken). It was printed in Nuremberg, probably by Hieronymus Andreae and reprinted in 1603 by Johan Janssenn in Arnhem. In 1535 it was also translated into Latin as On Cities, Forts, and Castles, Designed and Strengthened by Several Manners: Presented for the Most Necessary Accommodation of War (De vrbibus, arcibus, castellisque condendis, ac muniendis rationes aliquot : praesenti bellorum necessitati accommodatissimae), published by Christian Wechel (Wecheli/Wechelus) in Paris.

=== Fencing ===
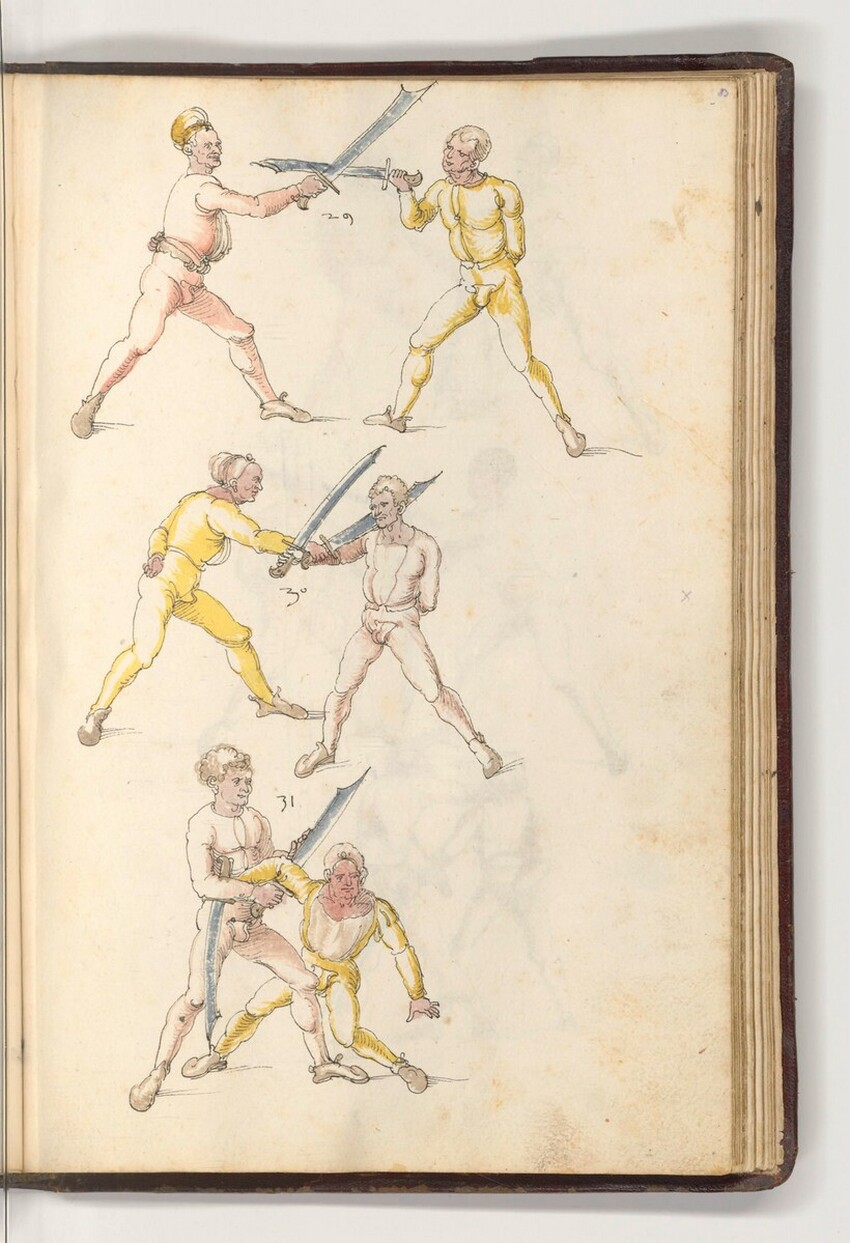
Page from the Meditation on the Handling of Weapons, 1512

Dürer created many sketches and woodcuts of soldiers and knights over the course of his life. His most significant martial works, however, were made in 1512 as part of his efforts to secure the patronage of Maximilian I. Using existing manuscripts from the Nuremberg Group as his reference, his workshop produced the extensive Οπλοδιδασκαλια sive Armorvm Tractandorvm Meditatio Alberti Dvreri ("Weapon Training, or Albrecht Dürer's Meditation on the Handling of Weapons", MS 26-232). Another manuscript based on the Nuremberg texts as well as one of Hans Talhoffer's works, the untitled Berlin Picture Book (Libr.Pict.A.83), is also thought to have originated in his workshop around this time. These sketches and watercolours show the same careful attention to detail and human proportion as Dürer's other work, and his illustrations of grappling, long sword, dagger, and messer are among the highest-quality in any fencing manual.

== Legacy and influence ==
Dürer exerted a huge influence on the artists of succeeding generations, especially in printmaking, the medium through which his contemporaries mostly experienced his art, as his paintings were predominantly in private collections located in only a few cities. His success in spreading his reputation across Europe through prints was undoubtedly an inspiration for major artists such as Raphael, Titian, and Parmigianino, all of whom collaborated with printmakers to promote and distribute their work.

His engravings seem to have had an intimidating effect upon his German successors, the "Little Masters" who attempted few large engravings but continued Dürer's themes in small, rather cramped compositions. Lucas van Leyden was the only northern European engraver to successfully continue to produce large engravings in the first third of the 16th century. The generation of Italian engravers who trained in the shadow of Dürer all either directly copied parts of his landscape backgrounds (Giulio Campagnola, Giovanni Battista Palumba, Benedetto Montagna and Cristofano Robetta), or whole prints (Marcantonio Raimondi and Agostino Veneziano). However, Dürer's influence became less dominant after 1515, when Marcantonio perfected his new engraving style, which in turn travelled over the Alps to also dominate Northern engraving.

Dürer had relatively little influence in Italy, where probably only his altarpiece in Venice was seen, and his German successors were less effective in blending German and Italian styles. His intense and self-dramatizing self-portraits have continued to have a strong influence up to the present, especially on painters in the 19th and 20th century who desired a more dramatic portrait style. Dürer has never fallen from critical favour, and there have been significant revivals of interest in his works in Germany in the Dürer Renaissance of about 1570 to 1630, in the early nineteenth century, and in German nationalism from 1870 to 1945.

The Lutheran Church commemorates Dürer annually on 6 April, along with Michelangelo, Lucas Cranach the Elder and Hans Burgkmair.

In 1993, two of Dürer's drawings – Women's Bathhouse, valued at about $10 million, and Sitting Mary and Child – along with other works of art were stolen from the National Art Museum of Azerbaijan. The drawings were later recovered.

== Gallery ==
Portraits

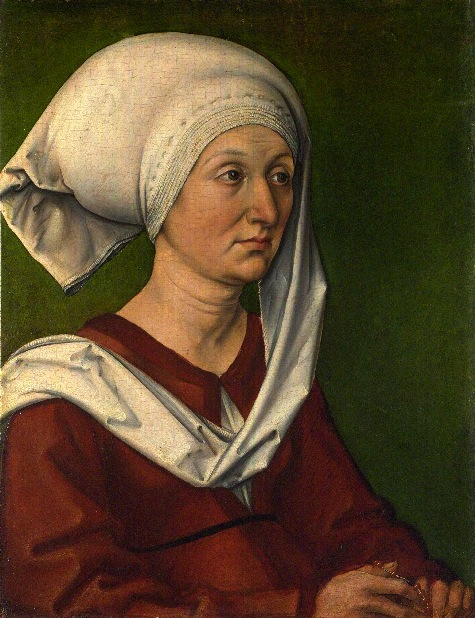
Portrait of Dürer's Mother Barbara, née Holper, 1490, oil on fir wood, 47.2 × 35.7 cm, Germanisches Nationalmuseum Nuremberg (Gm 1160)

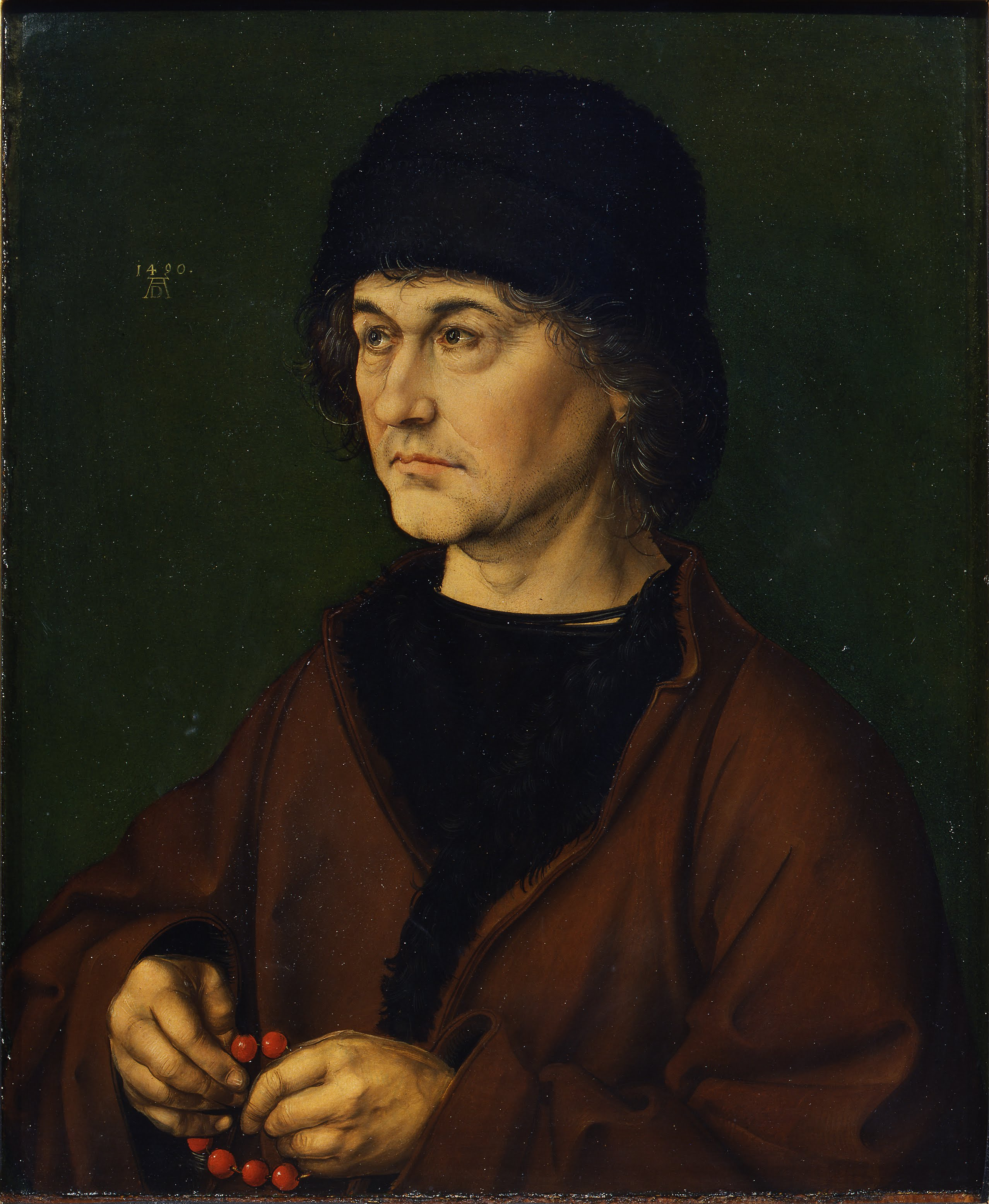
Albrecht Dürer the Elder with a Rosary, 1490, oil on panel, 47.5 × 39.5 cm, Uffizi, Florence

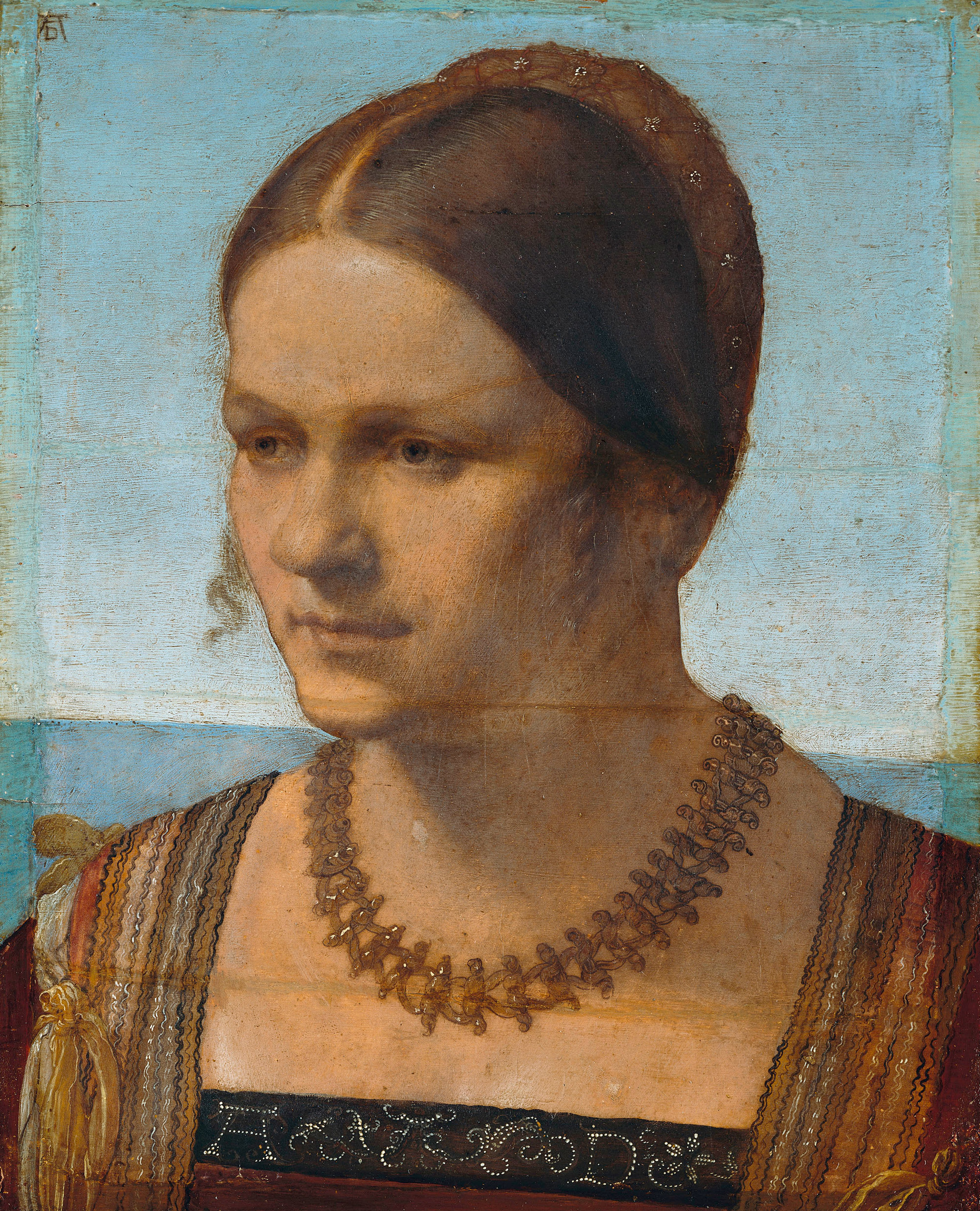
Portrait of a Venetian Woman, 1506, oil on poplar, 28.5 × 21.5 cm, Gemäldegalerie, Berlin (557G). The abstract background suggests the sea.

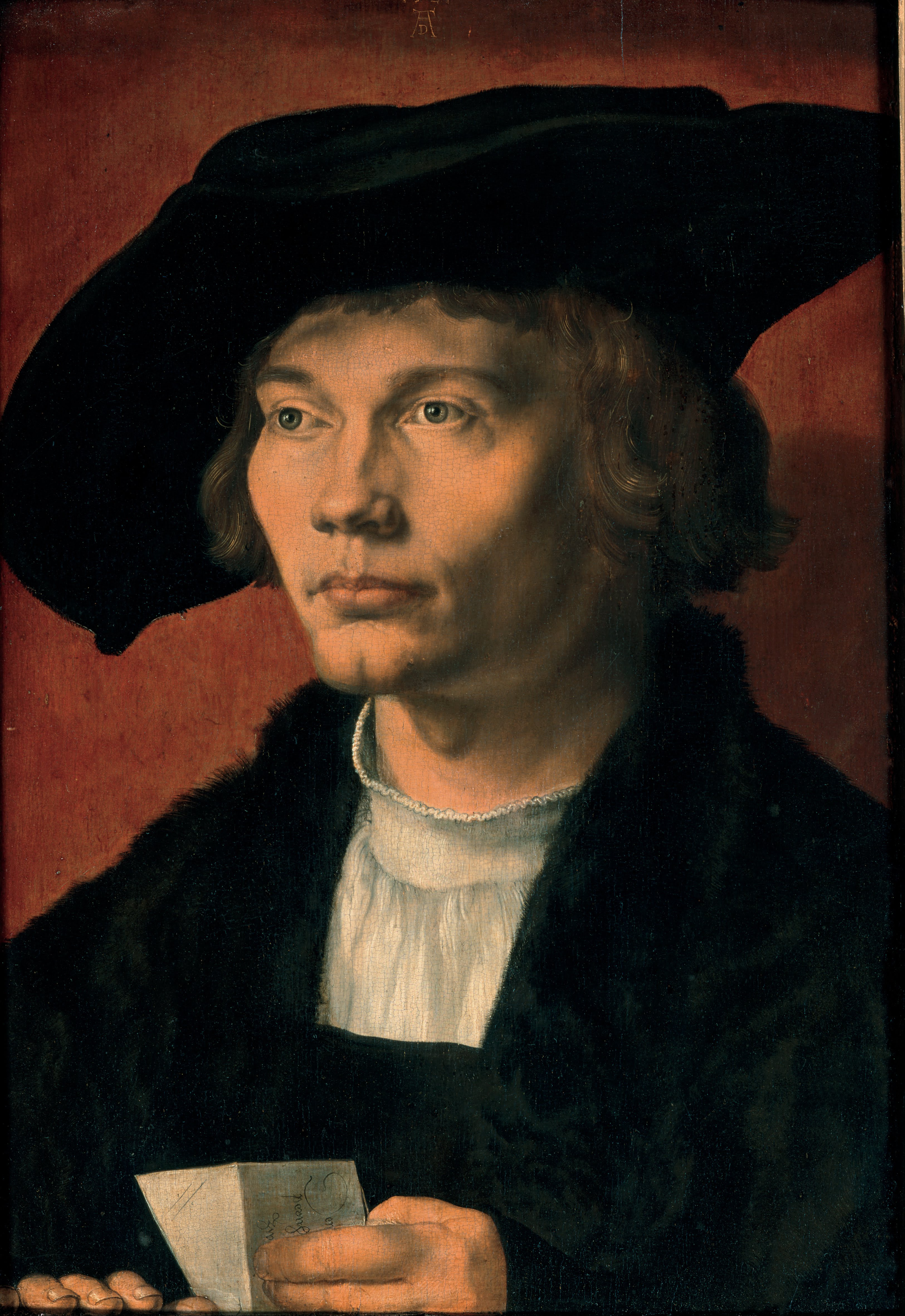
Portrait of Bernhard von Reesen, 1521, 45.5 × 31.5 cm, Gemäldegalerie Alte Meister, Dresden (1871)

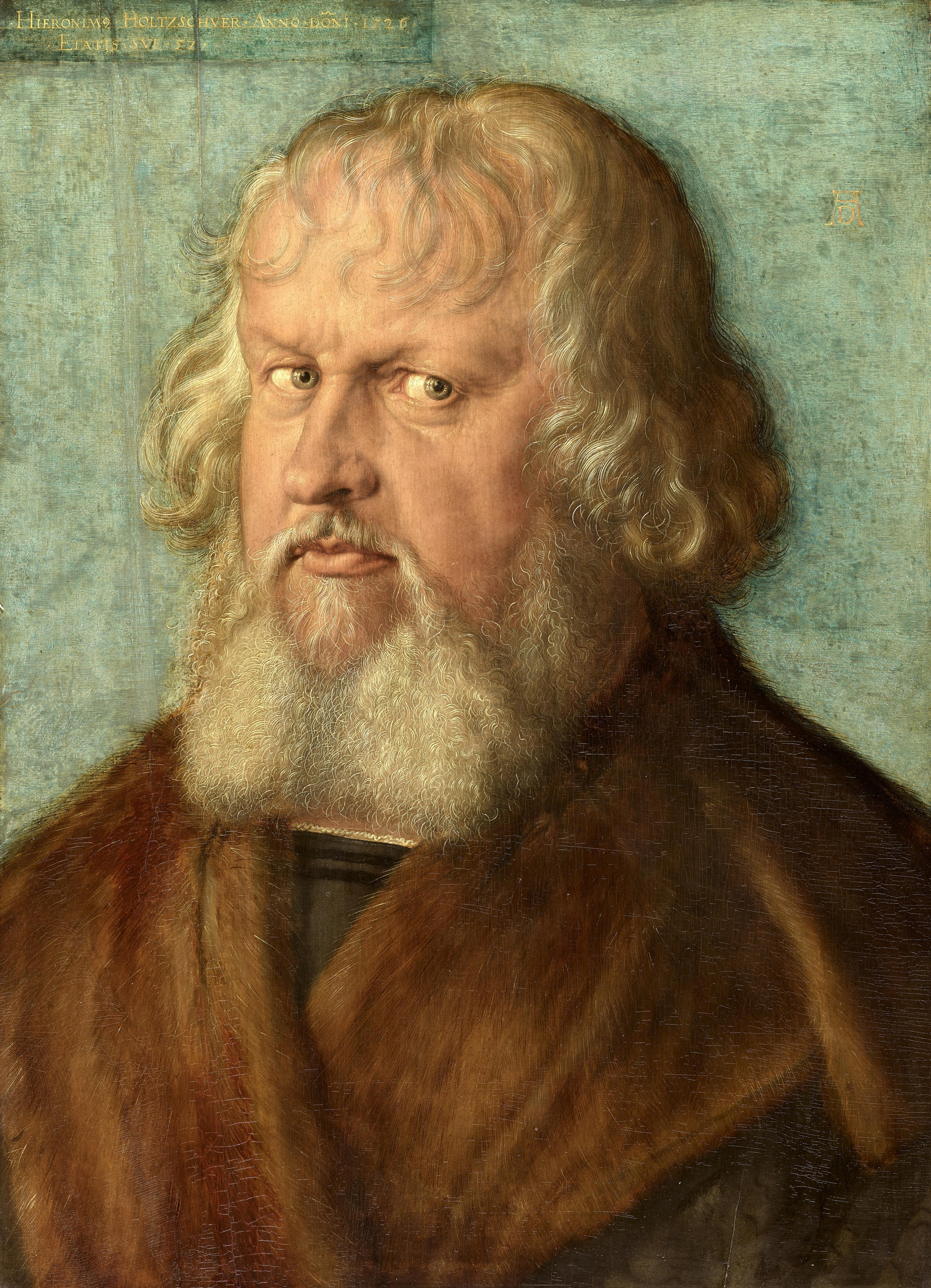
Portrait of Hieronymus Holzschuher, 1526, oil and paint on limewood, 51 × 37 cm, Gemäldegalerie, Berlin (557E)
Watercolours

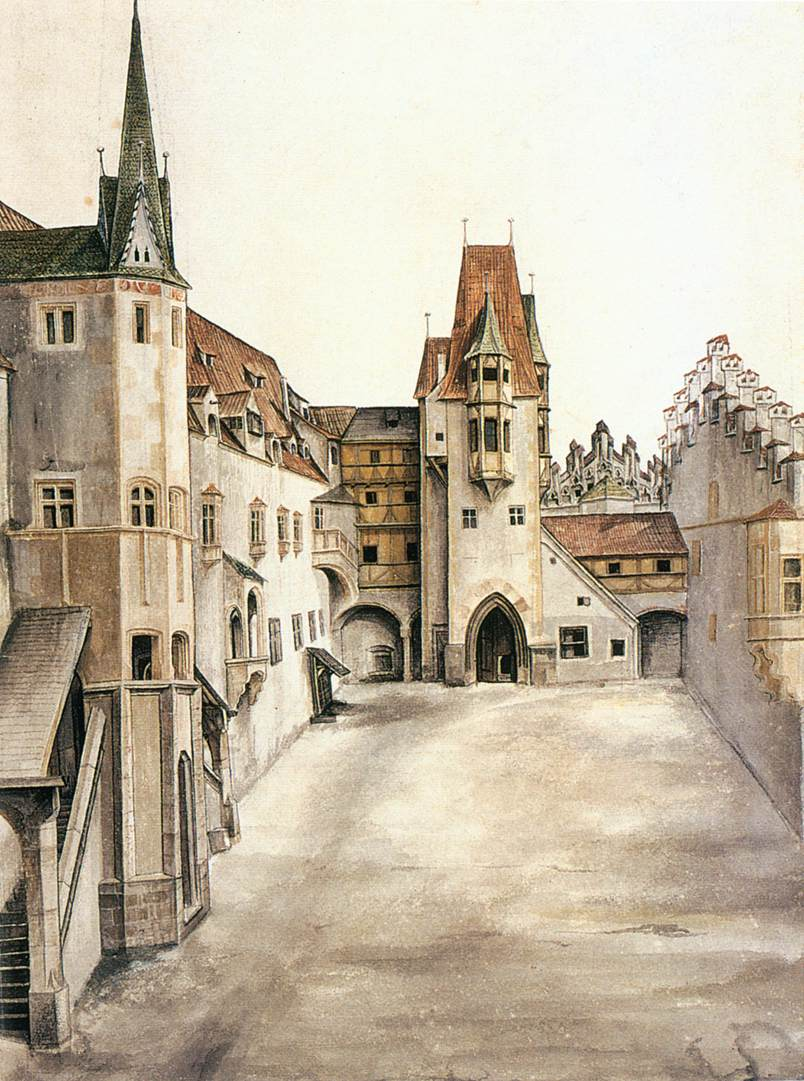
Innsbruck Castle Courtyard, c. 1495, watercolour and gouache, 36.8 × 26.9 cm, Albertina, Vienna (3057)

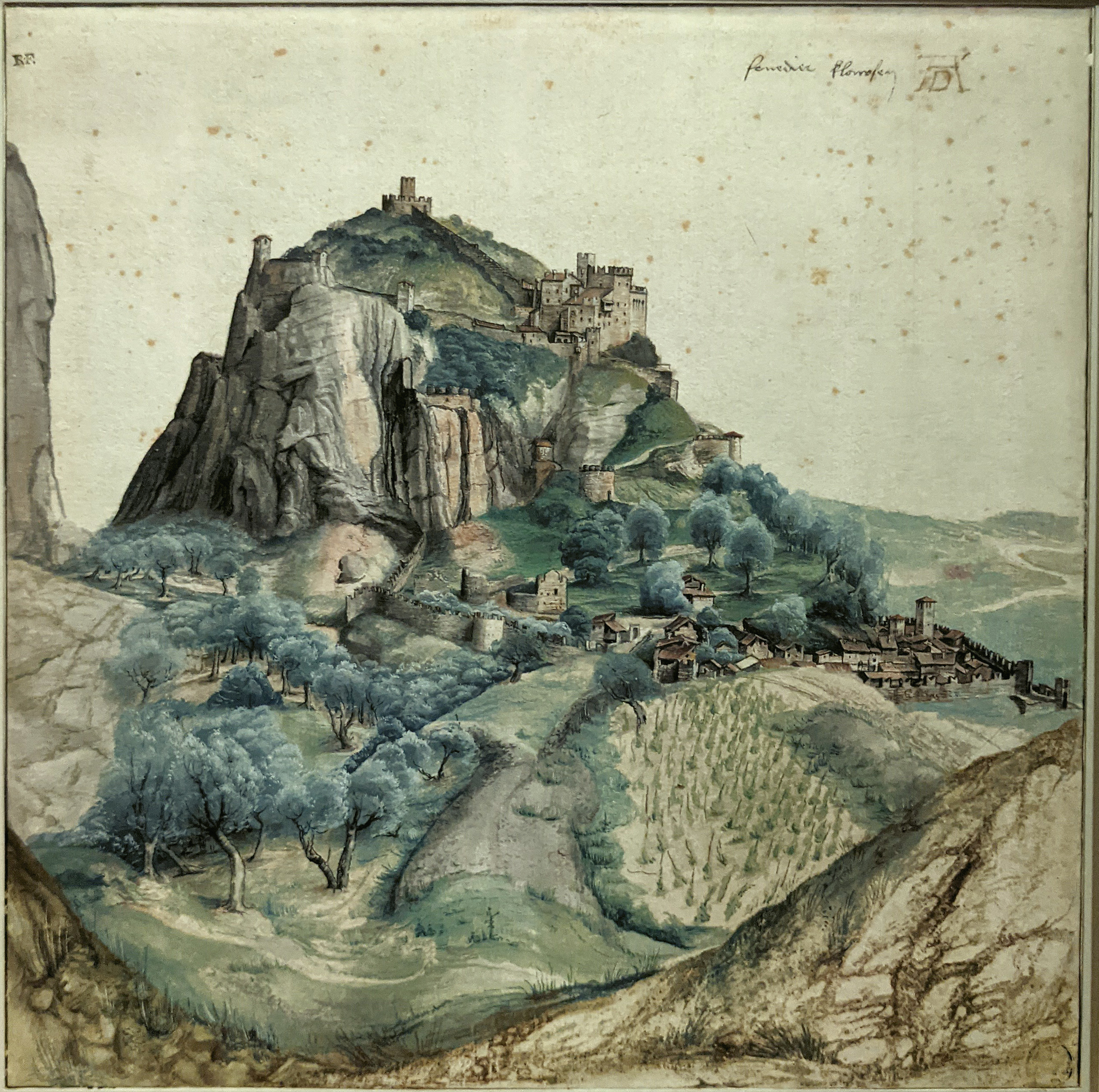
View of the Arco Valley in Tyrol, 1495, watercolour with highlights, 22.3 × 22.2 cm, Louvre, Paris

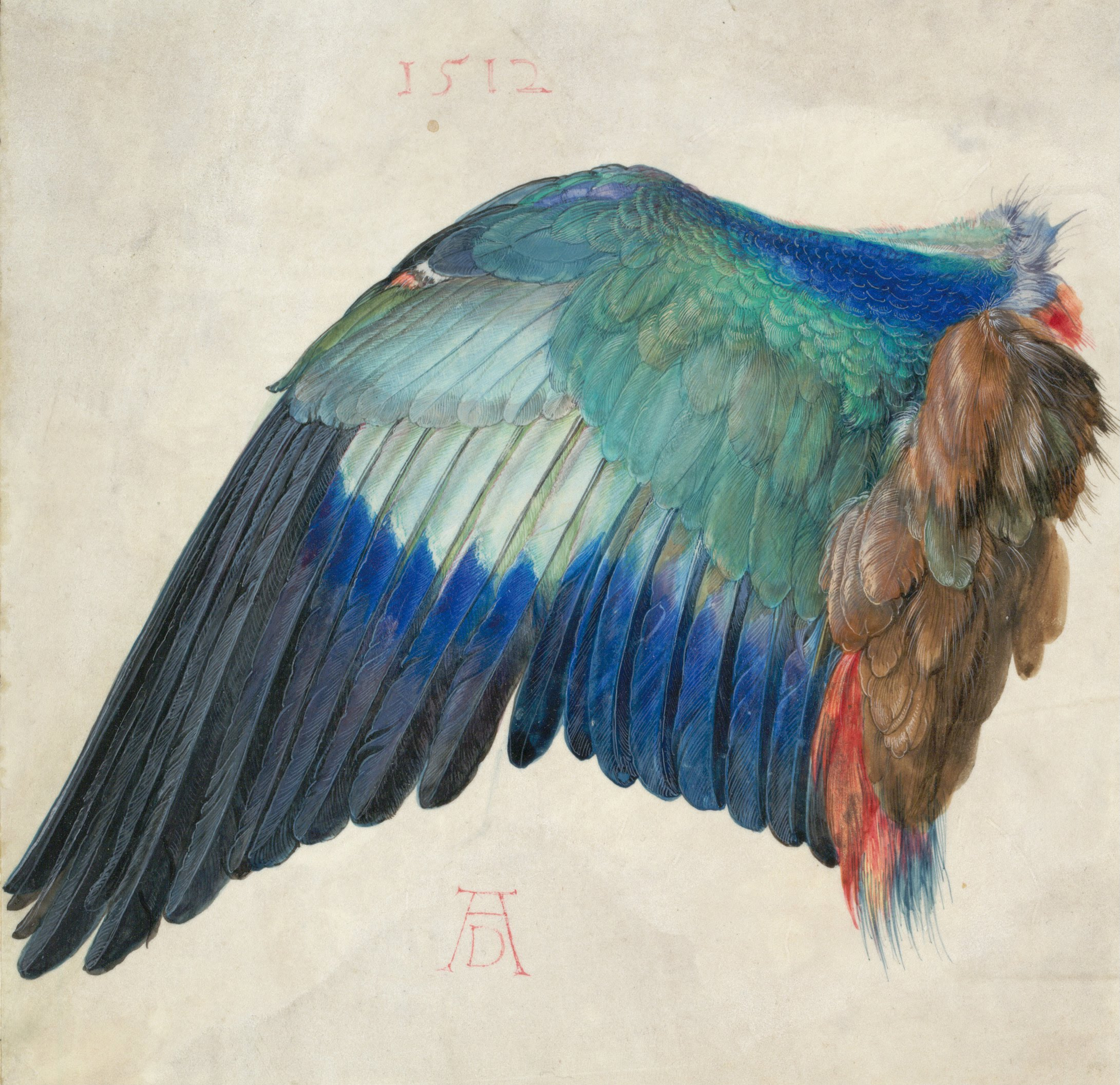
Wing of a European Roller, c. 1500 ("1512" by later hand), watercolour and gouache on parchment, 19.6 × 20 cm, Albertina (4840)

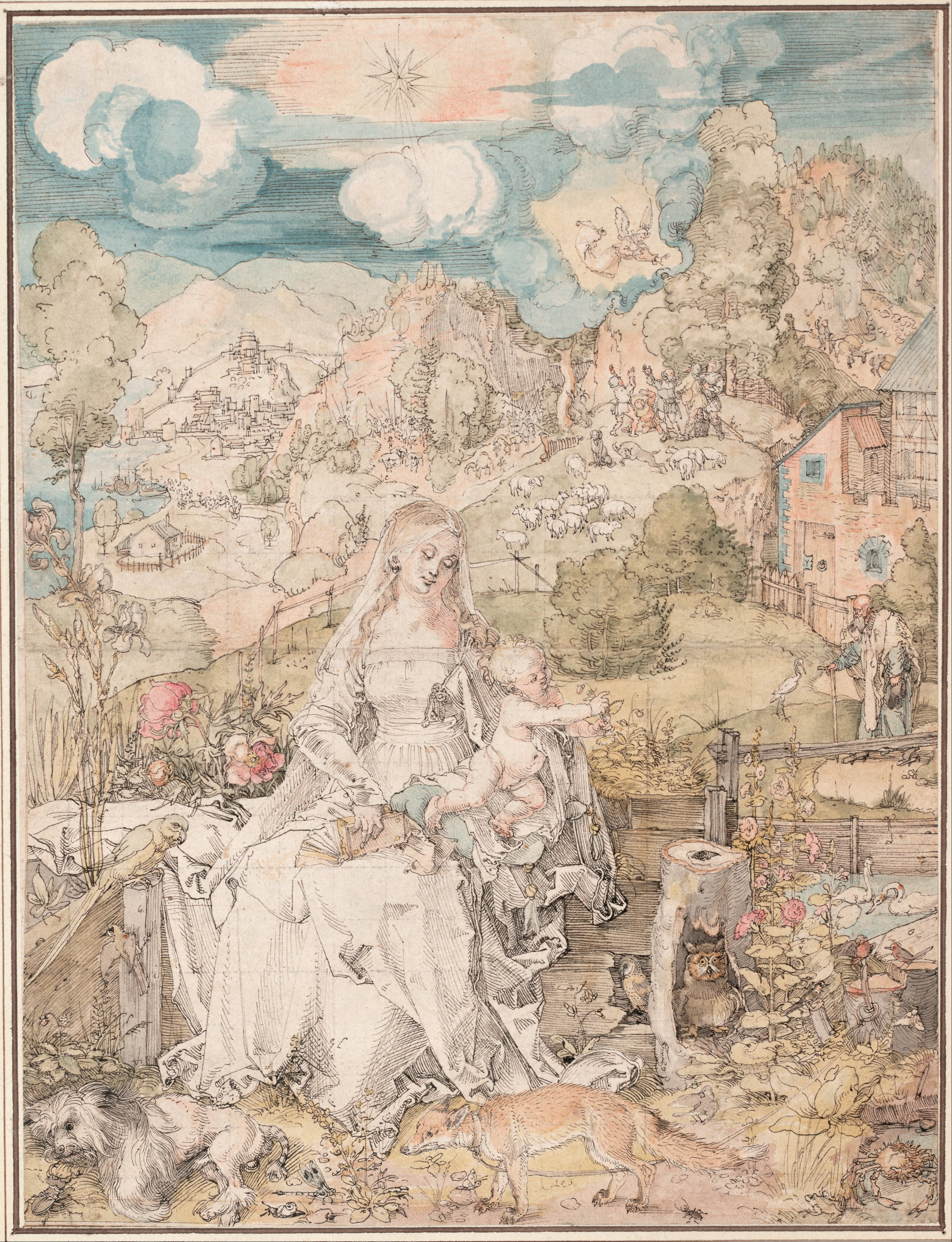
Mary among a Multitude of Animals, c. 1506, dark brown ink and watercolour, 31,9 × 24,1 cm, Albertina (3066)

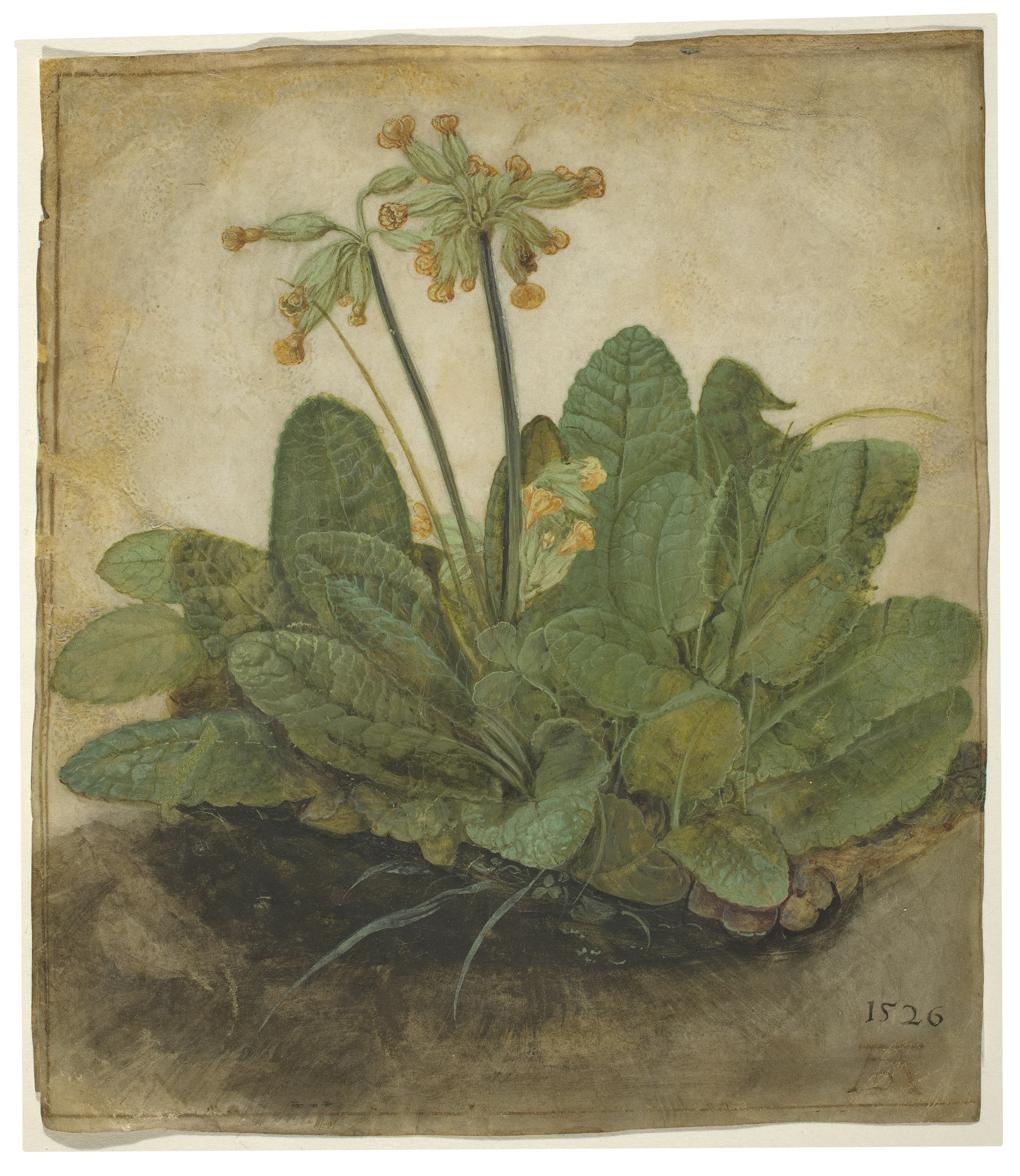
Tuft of Cowslips, 1526, gouache on vellum, 19.3 × 16.8 cm, National Gallery of Art
Drawings

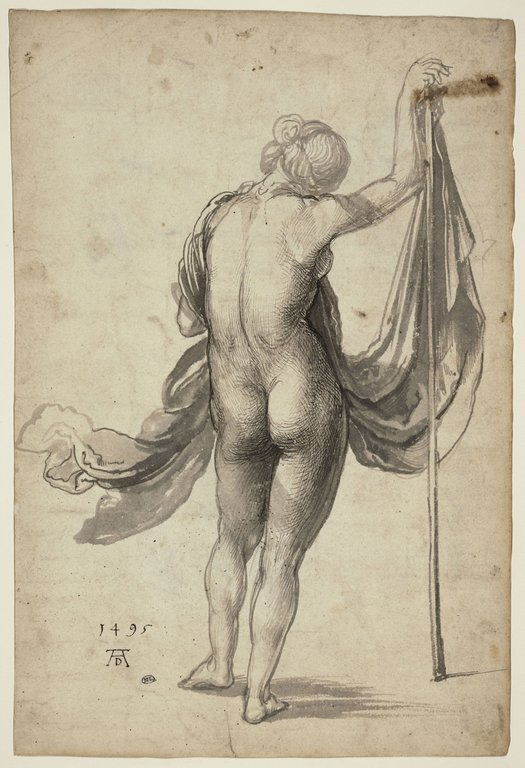
Study of a Female Nude from Behind, 1495, brush and pen on paper, 31.6 × 21.2 cm, Louvre, Paris (INV 19058 R)

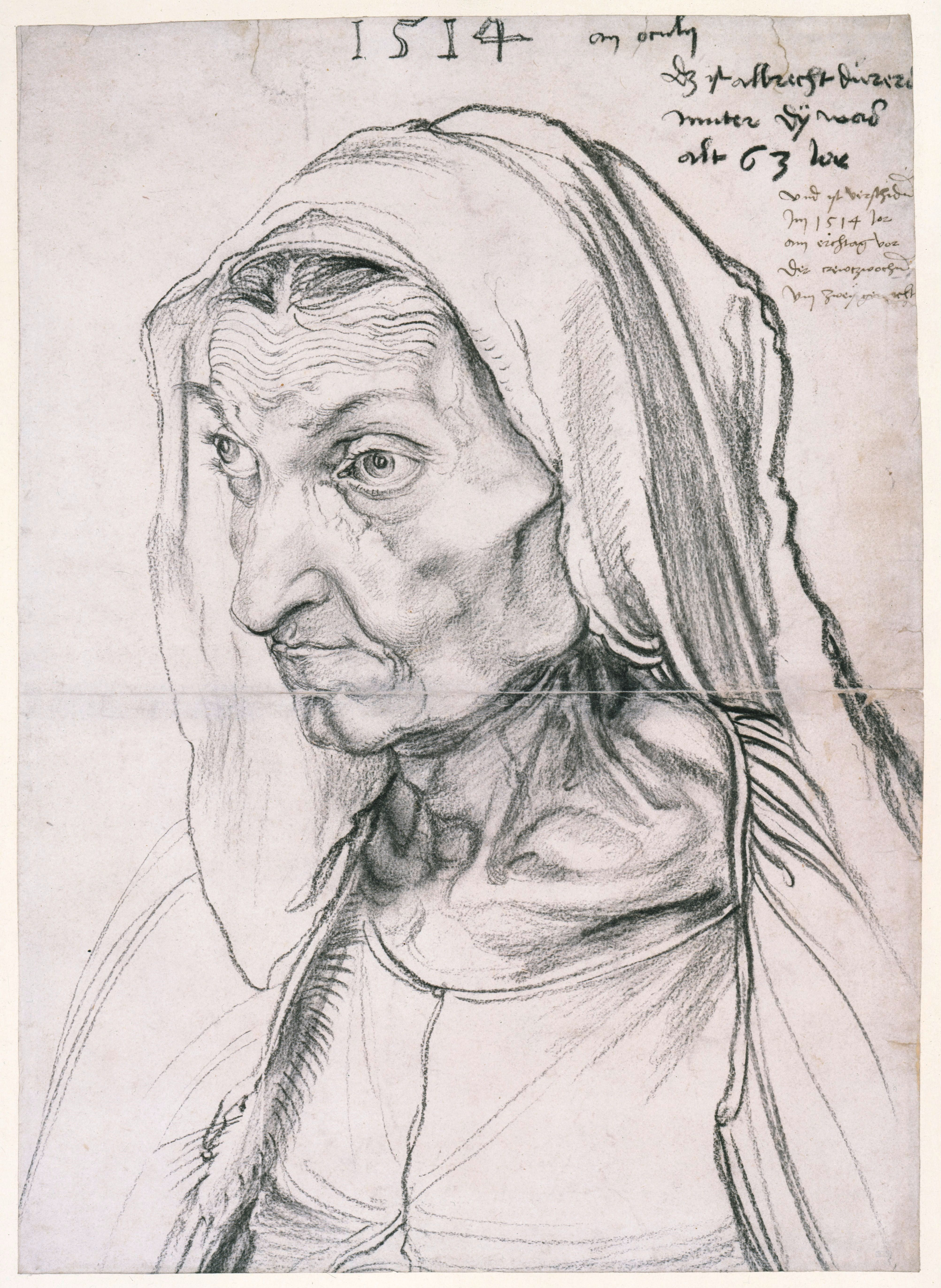
Portrait of the Artist's Mother at the Age of 63, spring 1514, charcoal on paper, 42.2 × 30.6 cm, Kupferstichkabinett Berlin (KdZ 22)

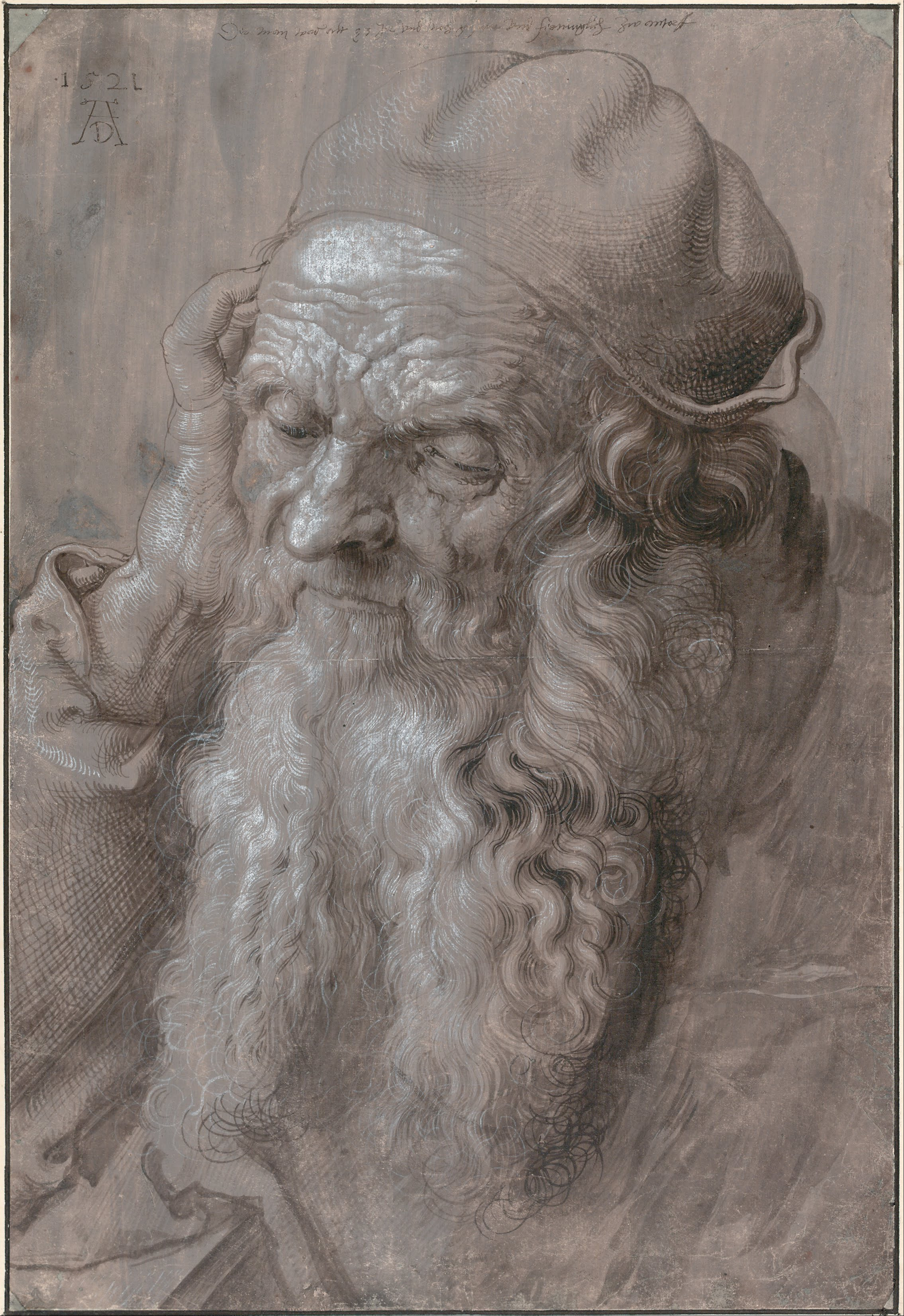
Head of an Old Man, 1521, brush, ink, heightened w/ gouache, on gray-violet prepared paper, 41.5 × 28.2 cm, Albertina (3167). Study for the St. Jerome

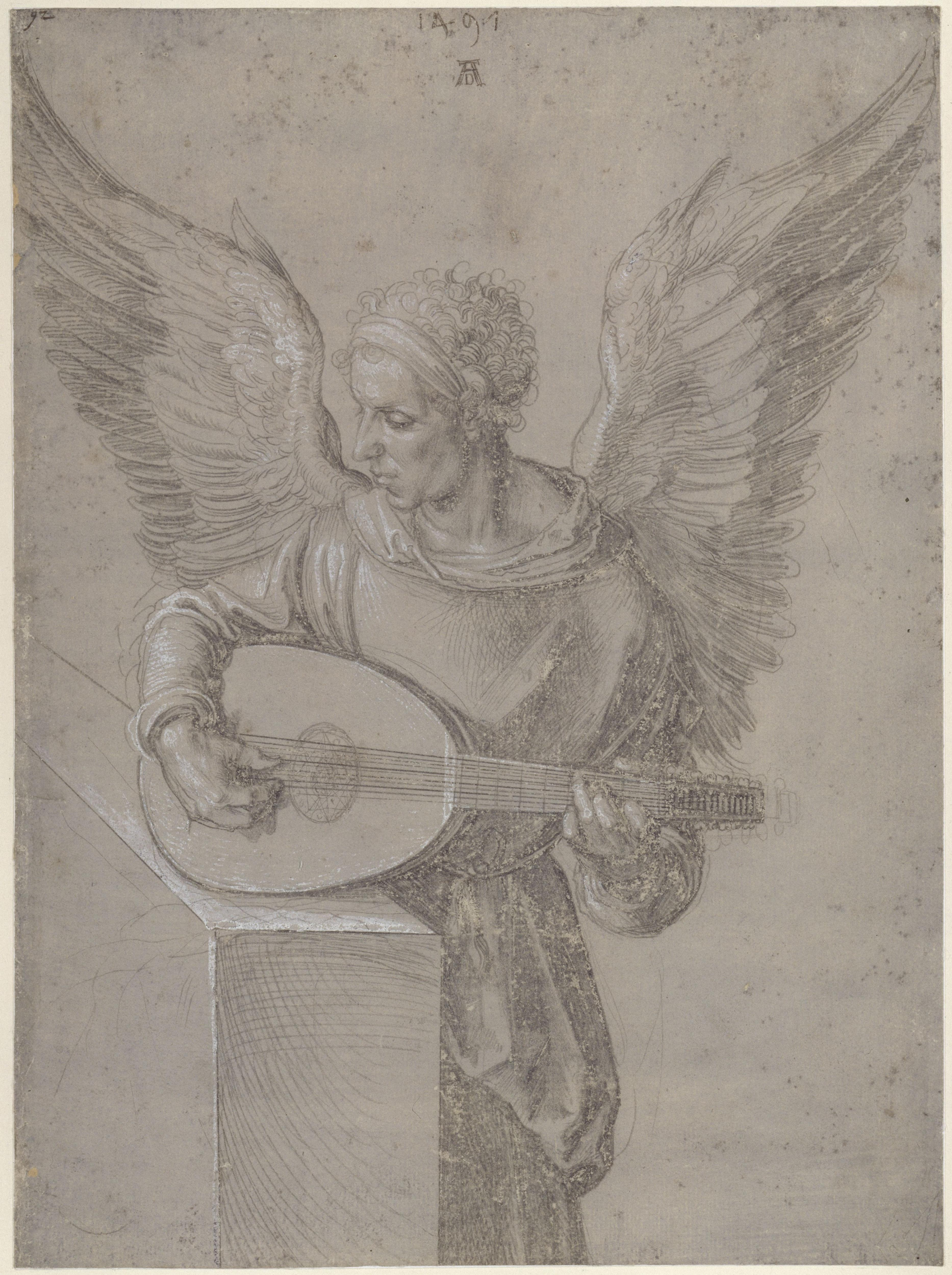
Seraphim plays the Lute, 1497, Kupferstichkabinett Berlin
Copper engravings and an etching

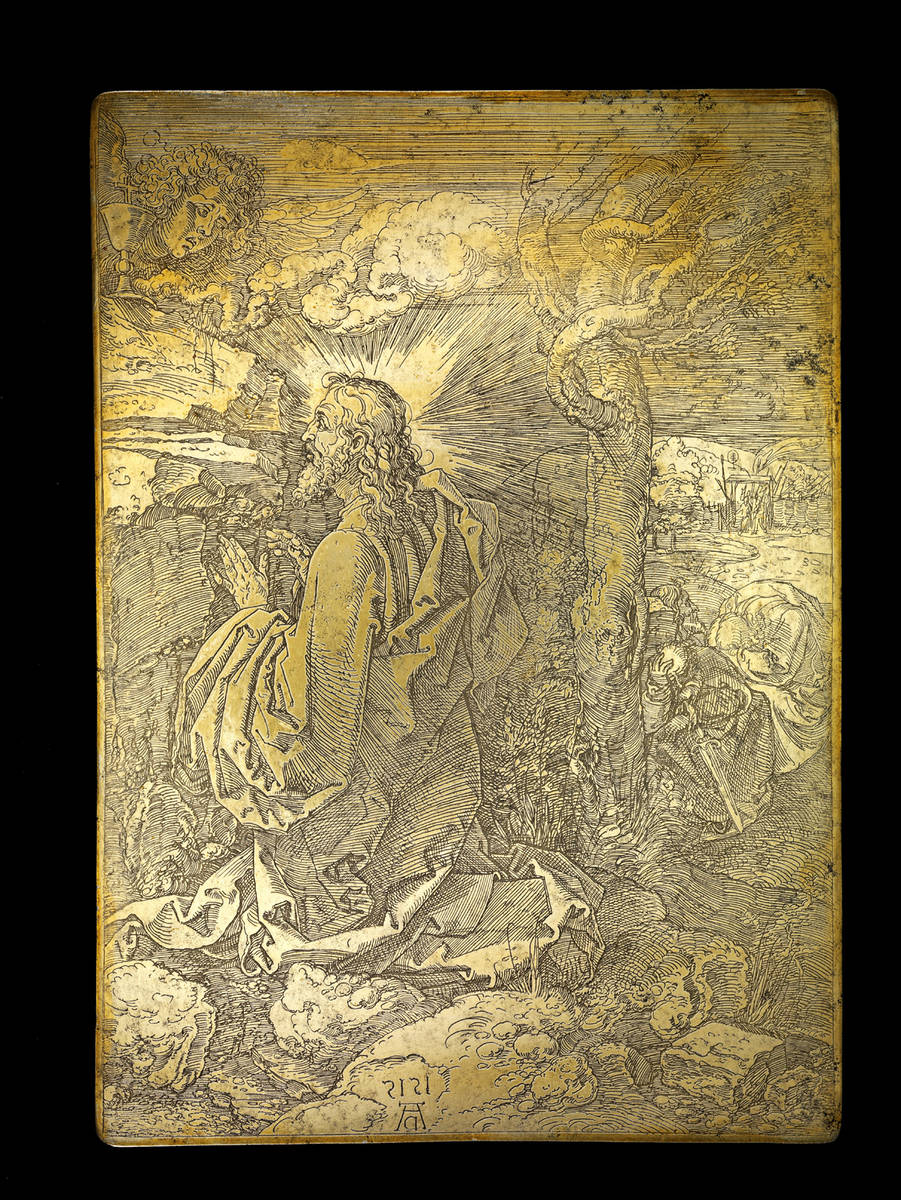
Christ on the Mount of Olives, 1515, the only surviving printing plate, iron, 22.7 × 16.1 cm, Bamberg State Library

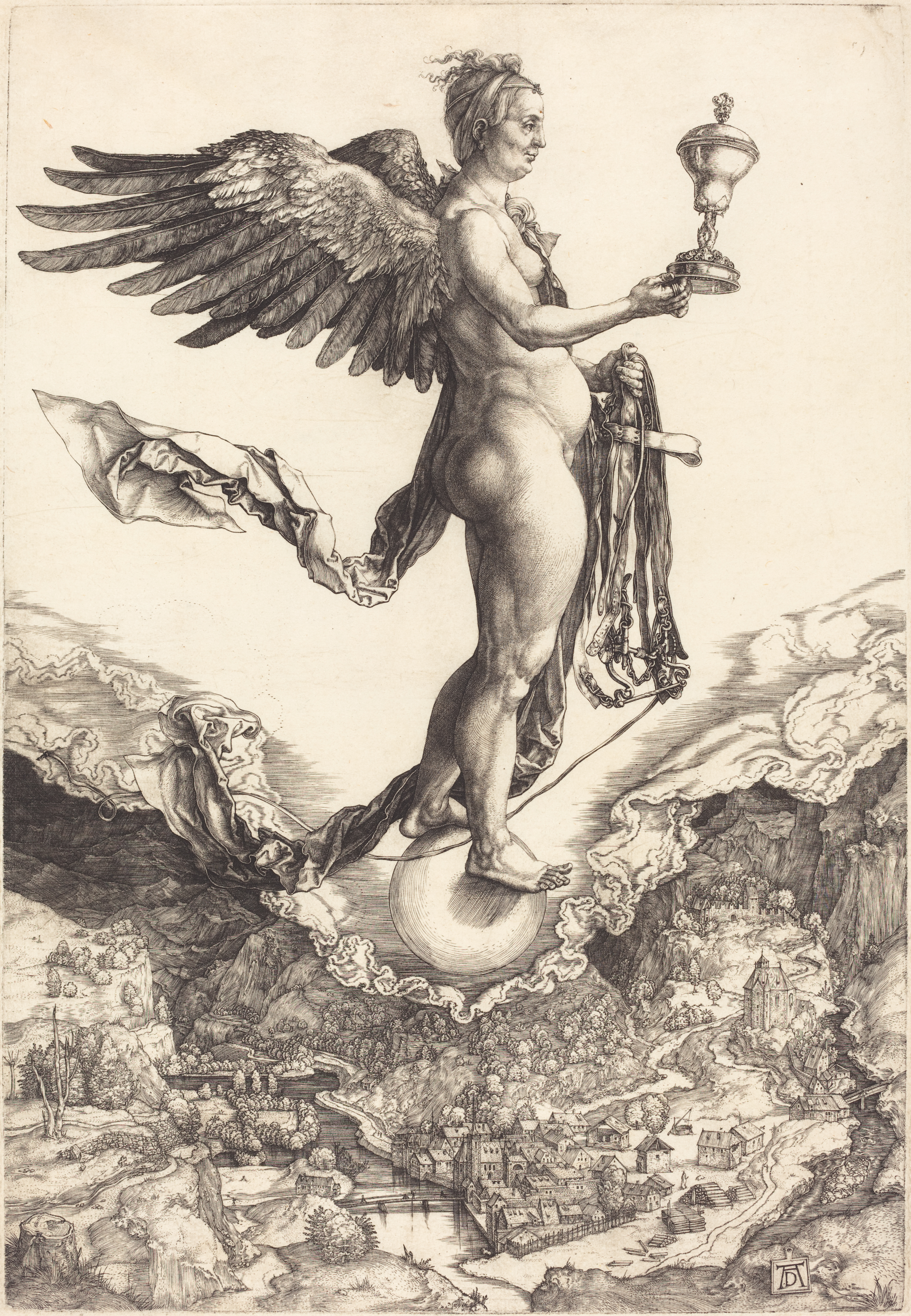
Nemesis (The Great Fortune), c. 1501/02, 33.5 × 23.3 cm (National Gallery of Art)

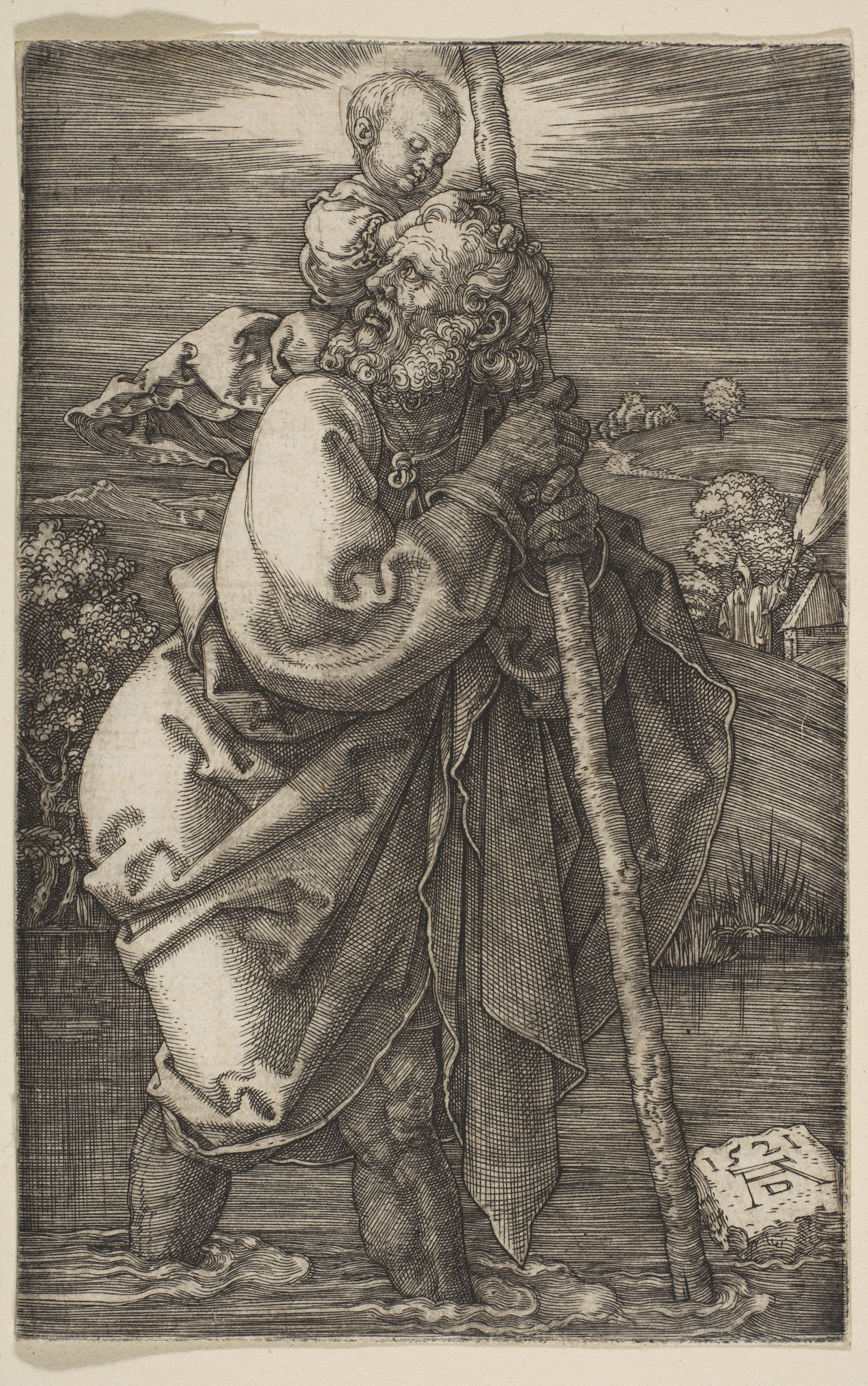
St. Christopher, 1521, 11.6 × 7.4 cm (Metropolitan Museum of Art)

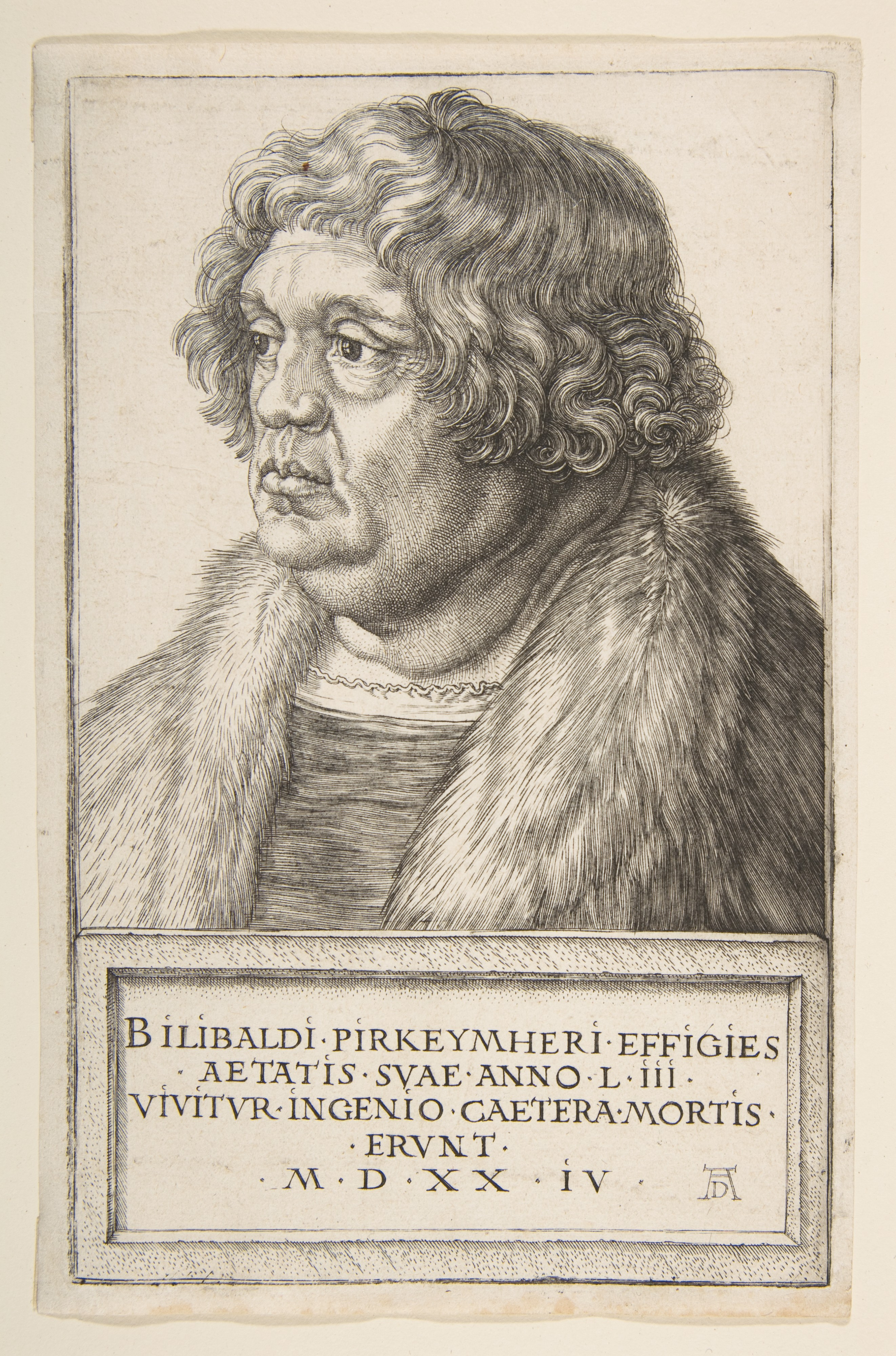
Portrait of Willibald Pirckheimer, 1524, 19 × 12.4 cm (Metropolitan Museum of Art)
Woodcut prints

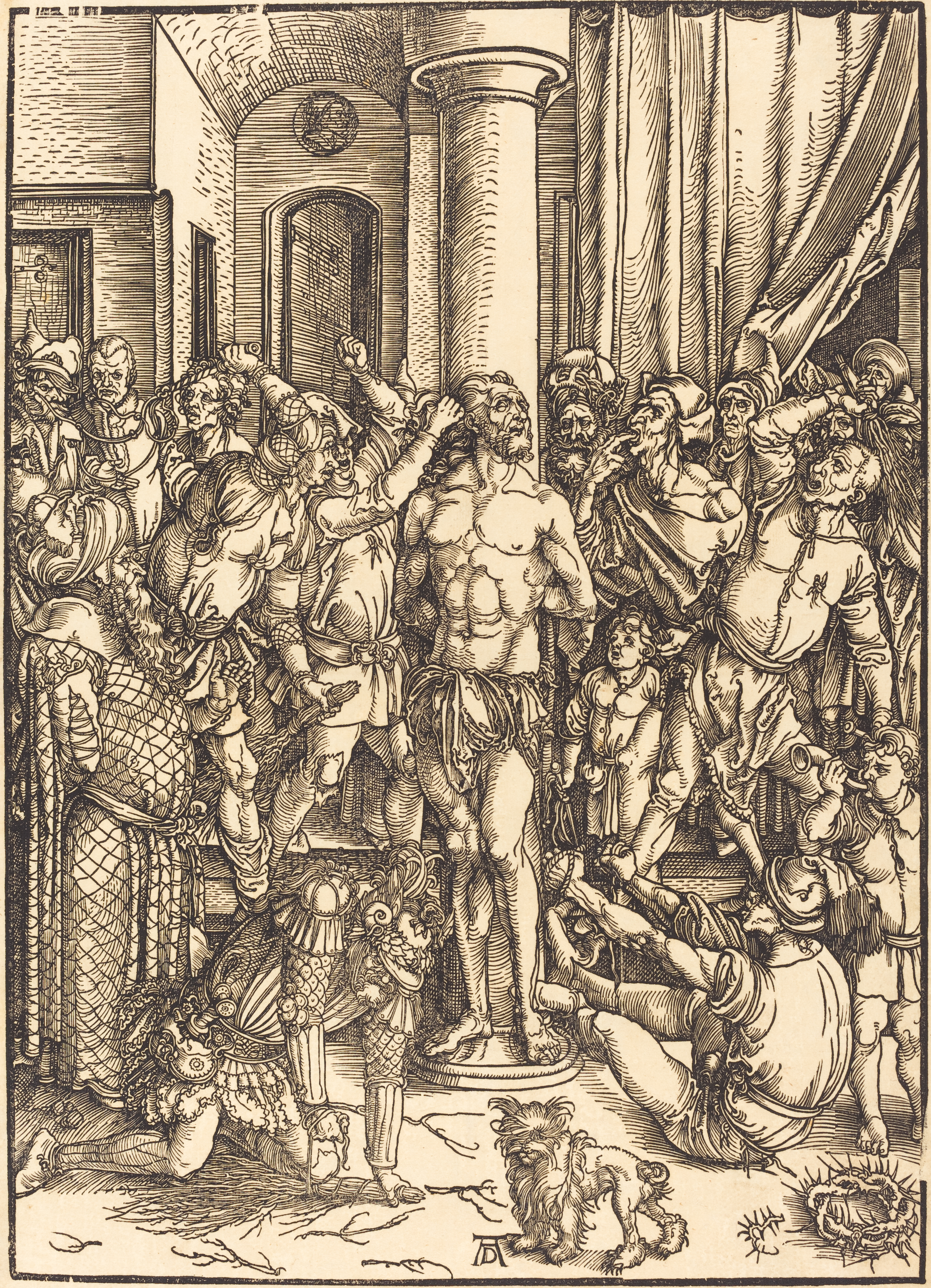
The Flagellation, from the Great Passion, c. 1497, 39 × 28 cm (printed c. 1498–1500, National Gallery of Art)

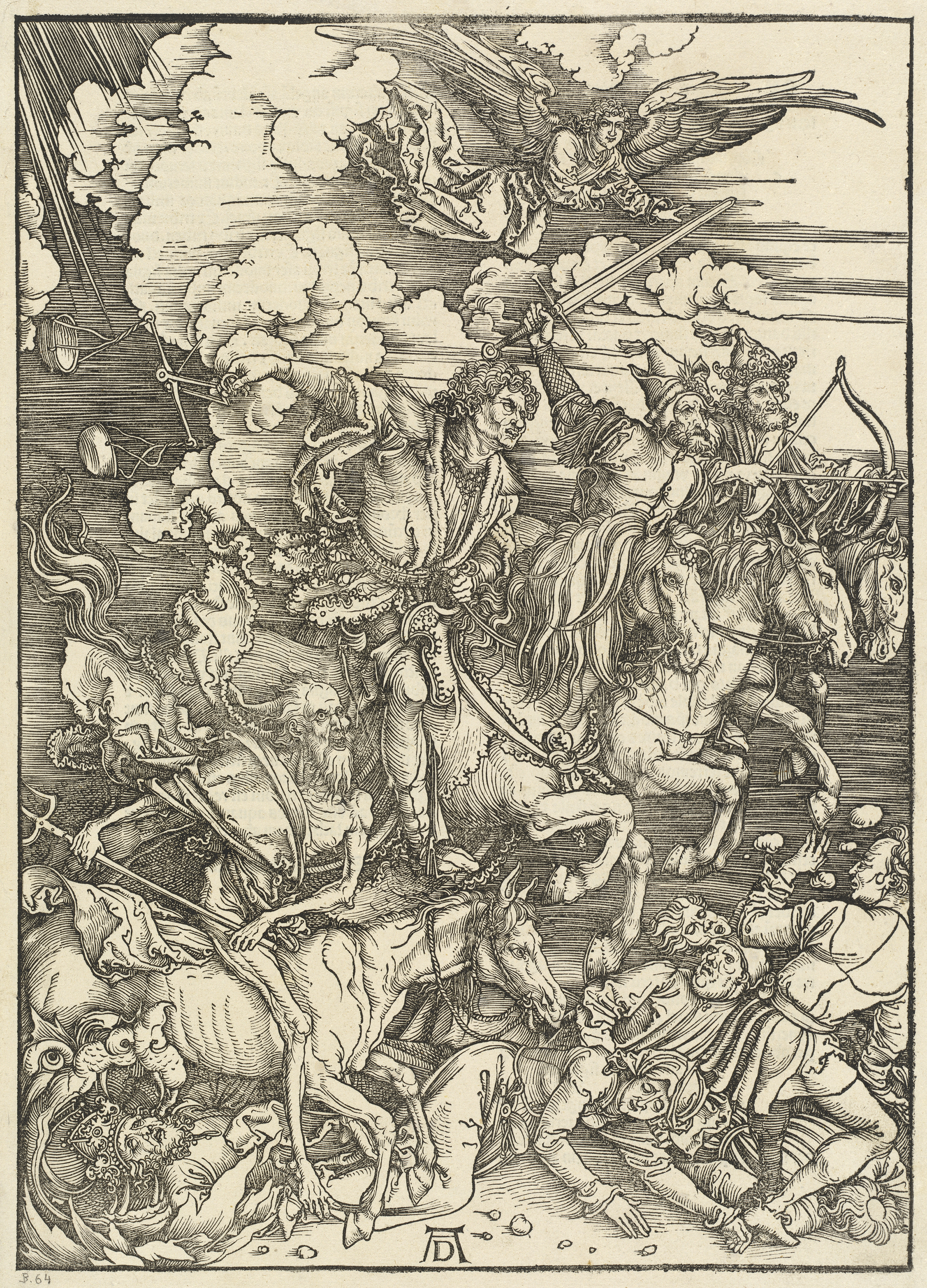
Four Horsemen of the Apocalypse, 1498, 39.5 × 28.5 cm (NGA, 142352)

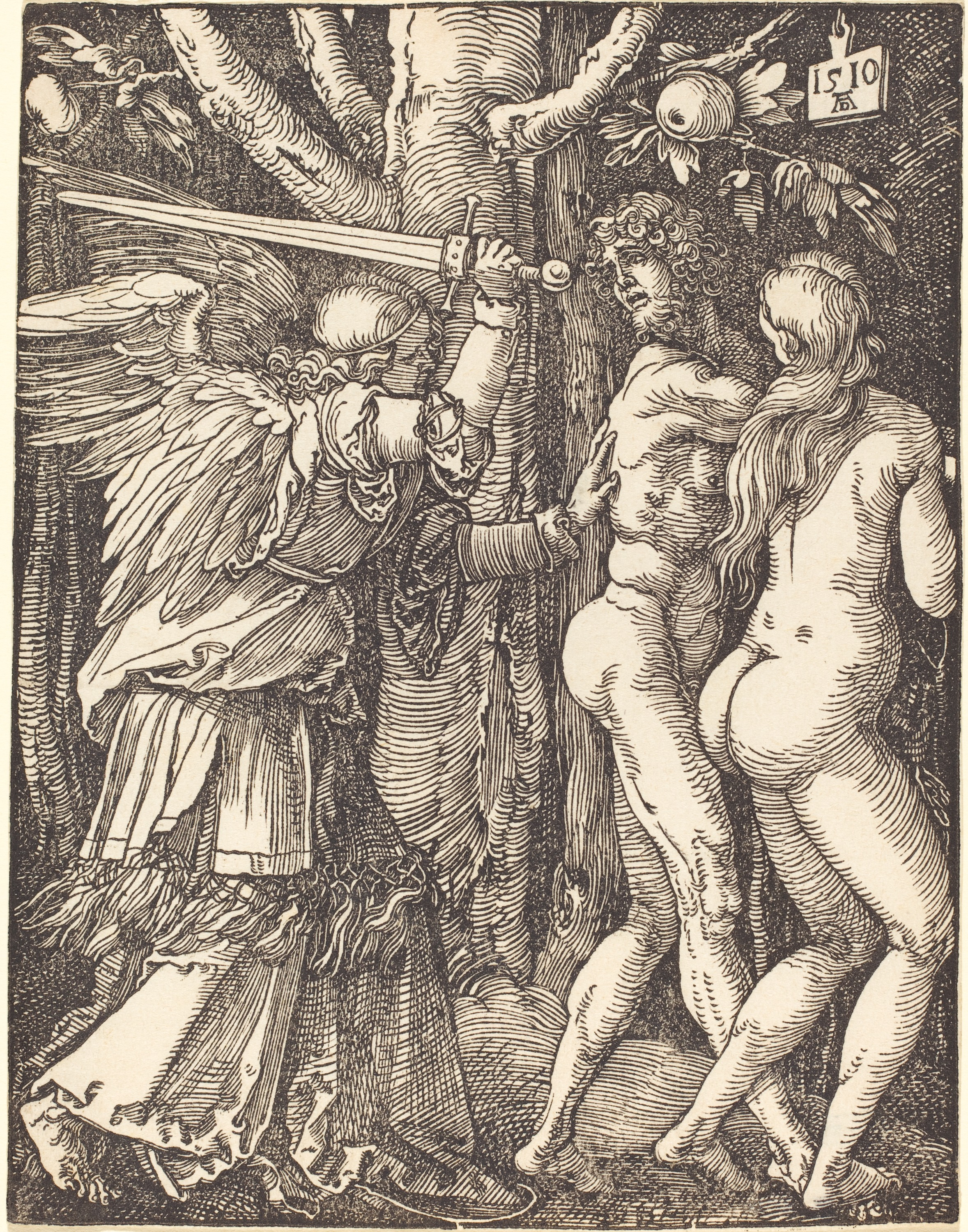
The Expulsion from Paradise from the Small Passion, 1510, 12.5 × 9.8 cm (NGA)

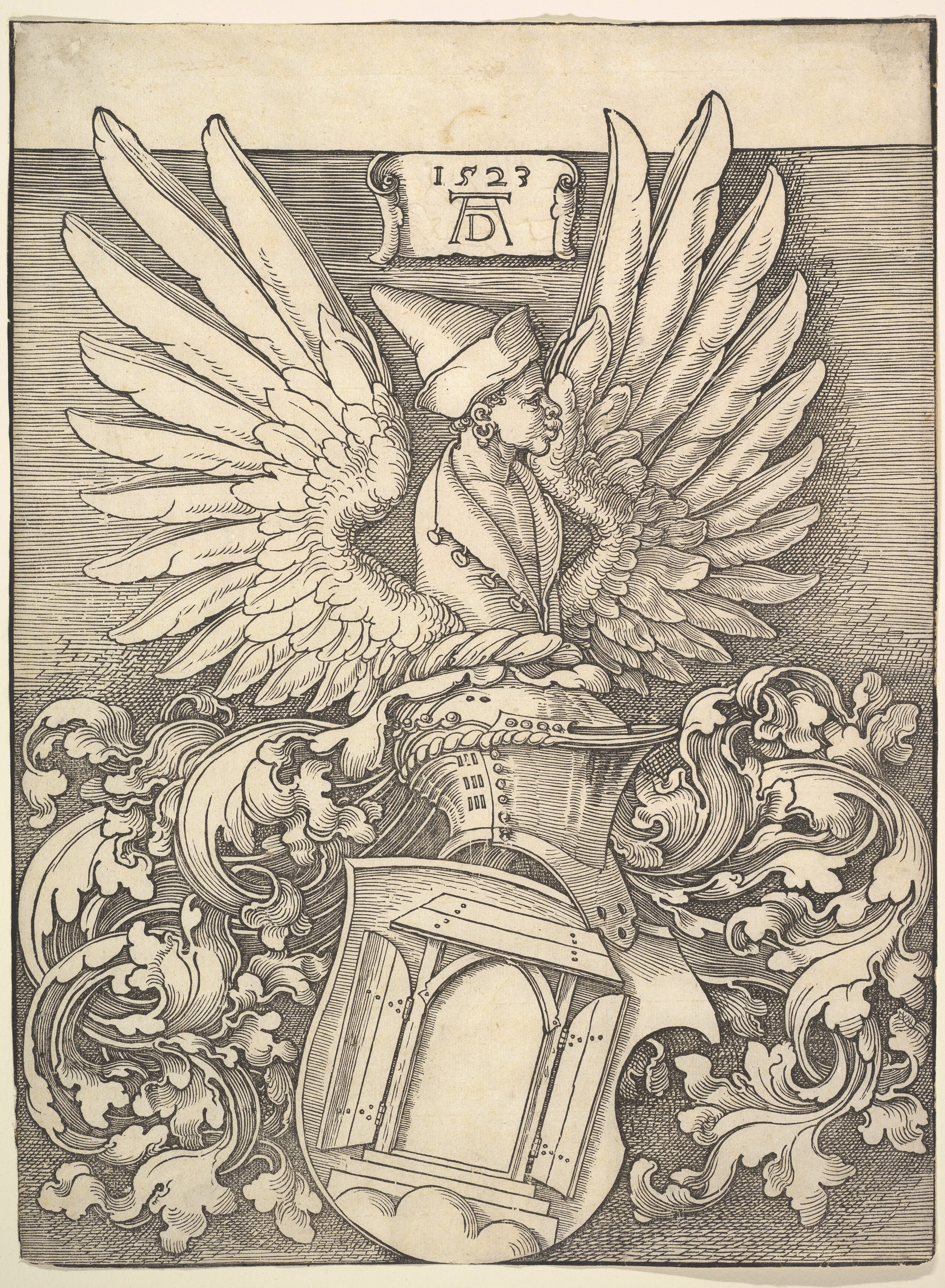
Coat of arms, which features a door as a pun on his name, and the winged bust of a Moor (1523), 35.1 × 26.1 cm (MET)

== List of works ==
- List of paintings by Albrecht Dürer
- List of engravings by Albrecht Dürer
- List of woodcuts by Albrecht Dürer
