= Albrecht Dürer's House =

Biographical museum in Nuremberg, Germany

Coordinates: 49°27′26″N 11°04′26″E

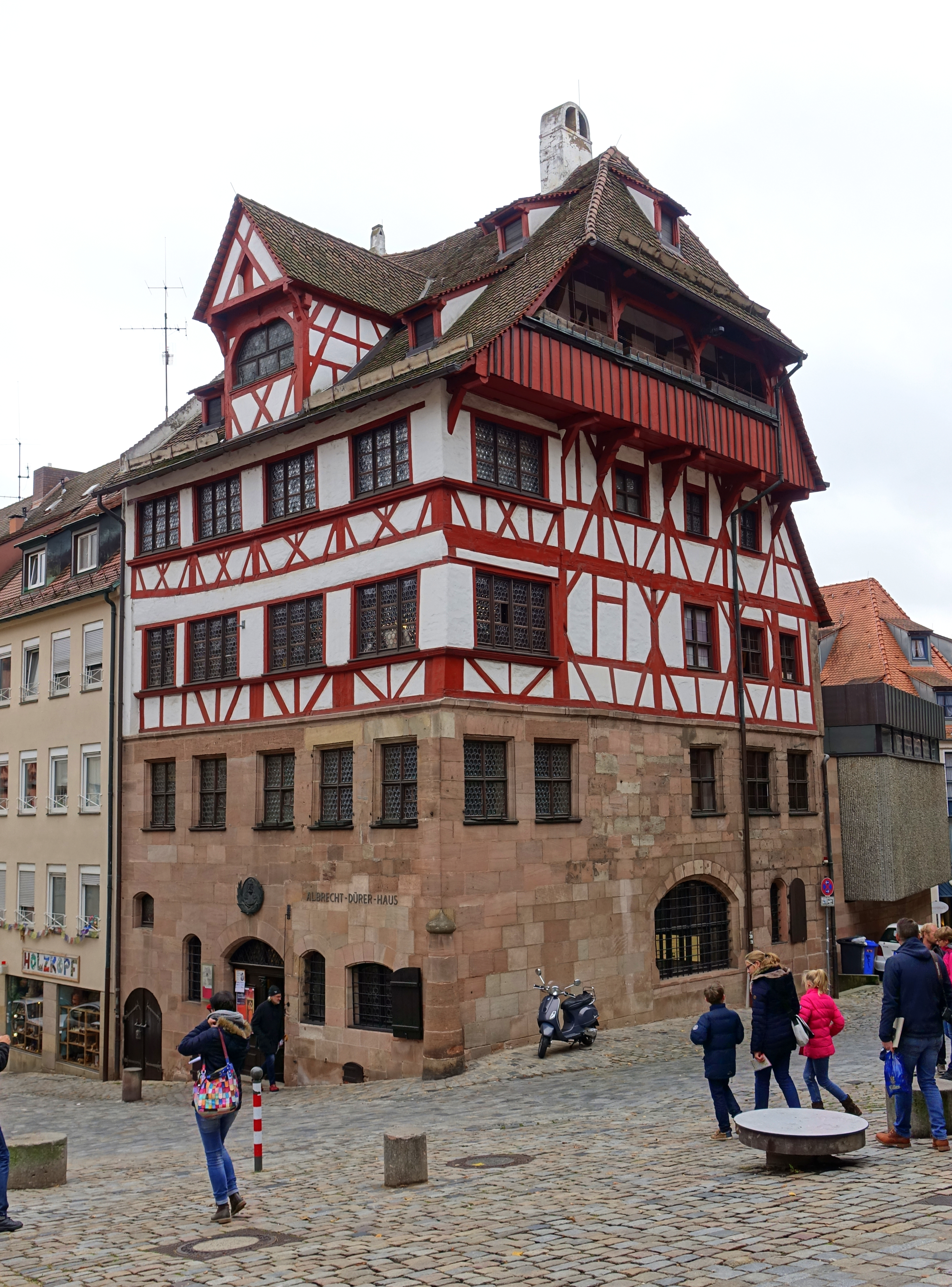
View of Albrecht Dürer's House

Albrecht Dürer's House

Albrecht Dürer's House (German: Albrecht-Dürer-Haus) is a Nuremberg Fachwerkhaus that was the home of German Renaissance artist Albrecht Dürer from 1509 to his death in 1528. The House lies in the extreme north-west of Nuremberg's Altstadt, near the Kaiserburg section of the Nuremberg Castle and the Tiergärtnertor of Nuremberg's city walls.

The house was built around 1420. It has five stories; the bottom two have sandstone walls, while the upper stories are timber framed; the entire structure is topped by a half-hip roof. In 1501, it was purchased by Bernhard Walther, a merchant and prominent astronomer. Walther remodeled the house, adding small windows to the roof so that it could function as an observatory. Walther died in 1504, and Dürer purchased the house in 1509.

Since 1871, the Albrecht-Dürer-Haus has been a museum dedicated to Dürer's life and work. In a restoration of 1909, the large dormer on the east-facing roof was replaced. In October 1944, it took significant damage from Allied bombing. It was rebuilt by 1949, but did not reopen as a museum until 1971, Dürer's 500th birthday.

The museum features installations of period furnishings, a re-creation of Dürer's workshop in which visitors can view demonstrations of printmaking techniques, and rotating exhibitions of drawings and prints by Dürer from the City of Nuremberg's Graphic Collection. Visitors can also receive a guided tour of the house from an actress playing Agnes Dürer, the wife of the artist.

== Gallery ==
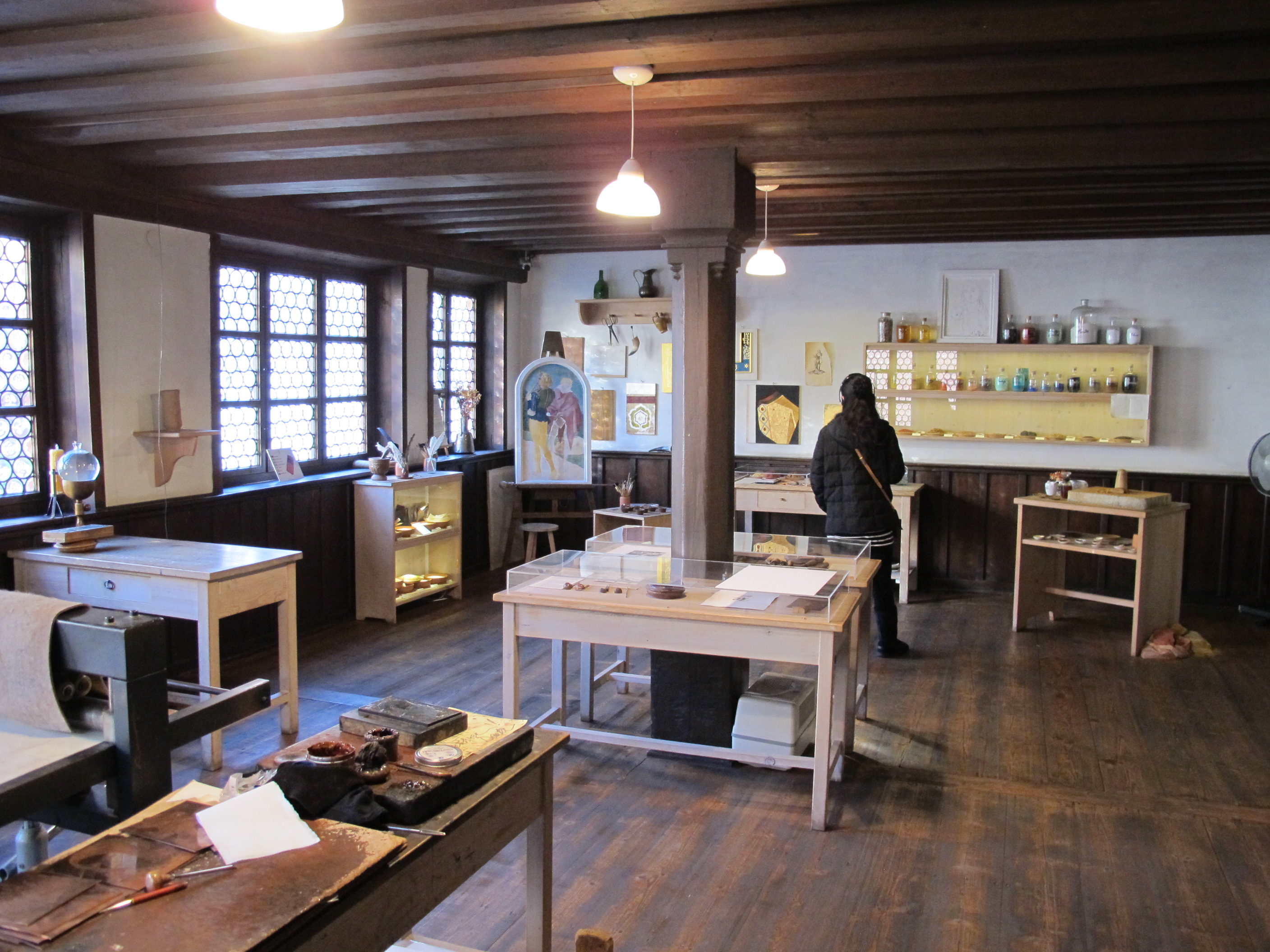
Interior: Workshop

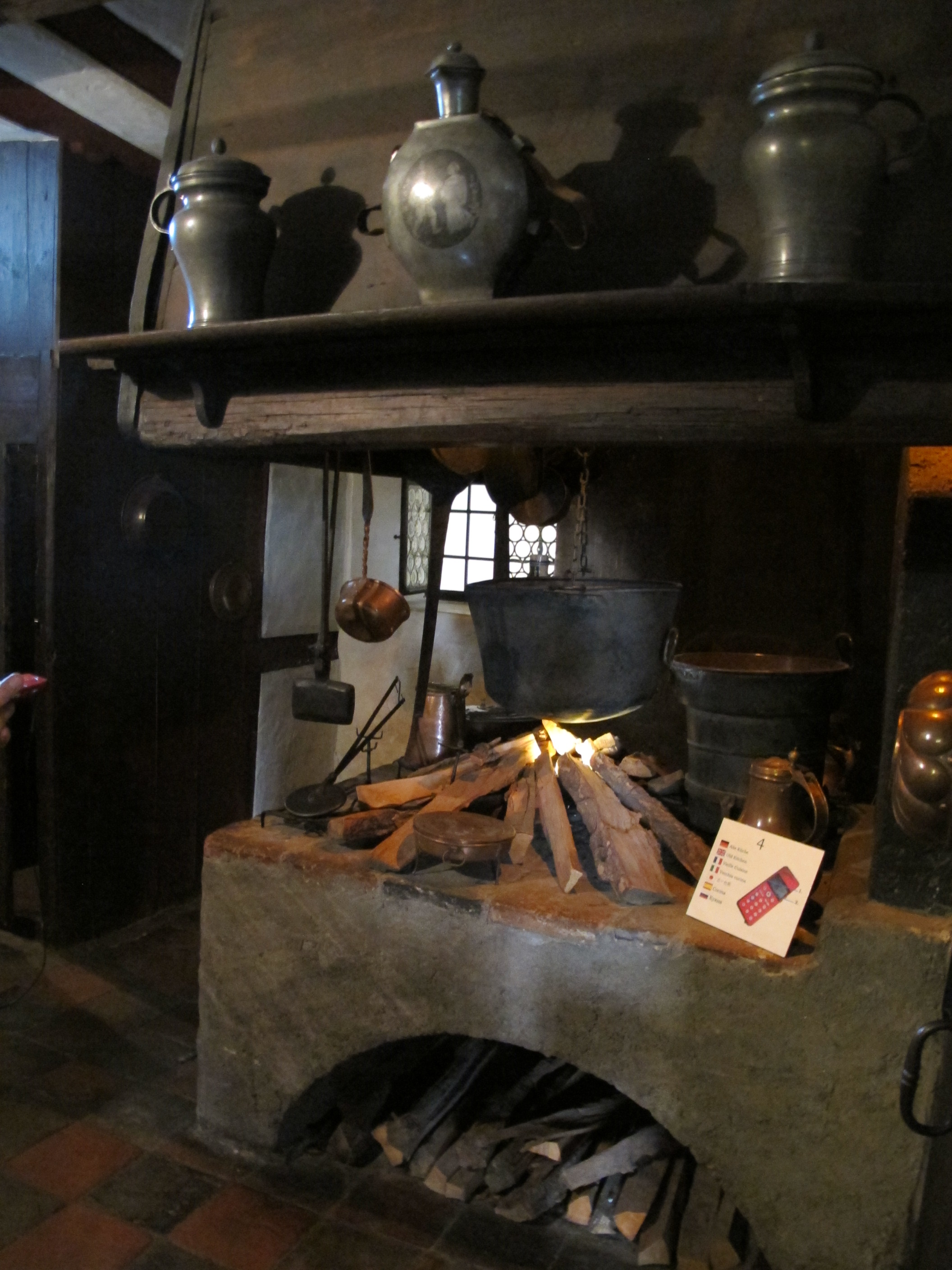
Interior: Kitchen

Kitchen in Dürer's House about 1905

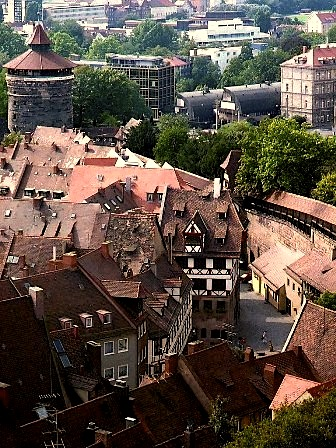
Exterior: seen looking down from the Nuremberg Castle

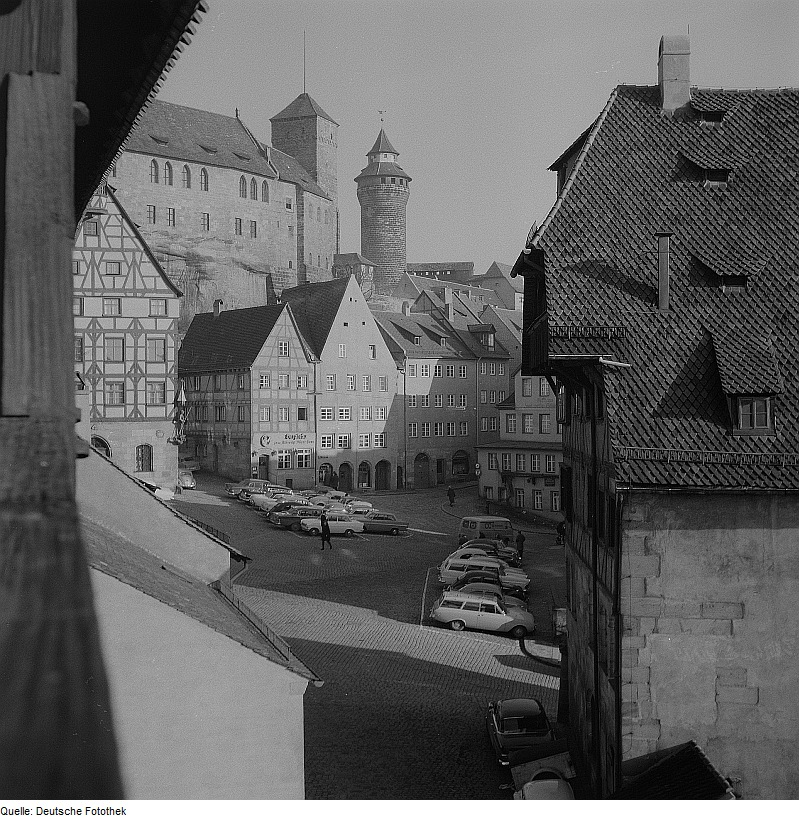
Exterior: the side of the house, looking up toward the castle
