= Famiglietti =

Famiglietti is an occupational surname of Italian origin, referring to a domestic servant, derived from the old Italian word famiglio. Notable people with the surname include:

- Ángel Famiglietti (1927–2001), Panamanian weightlifter
- Anthony Famiglietti (born 1978), American track and field athlete
- Gary Famiglietti (1913–1986), American football player
- James S. Famiglietti, Canadian professor and hydrologist
- Mark Famiglietti (born 1979/80), American actor, screenwriter, film producer and author
- Tekla Famiglietti (1936–2020), Italian abbess
