= University of California Center for Hydrologic Modeling =

Located at the University of California, Irvine

The University of California Center for Hydrologic Modeling (UCCHM) is a campus-wide hydrologic modeling research center, located at the University of California, Irvine. The models and modeling frameworks developed at the center address the urgent environmental and health issues related to water availability, such as how water availability will change in response to external factors like global climate change, how water availability will change with diminishing snow and ice, and how the frequency of hydrologic extremes (flood and drought) will affect the state of California. The UCCHM team, made up of faculty, researchers and students, is working towards creating a state-of-the-art integrated model of California water resources that can influence and inform leaders of local, state and regional governments when making water management decisions.

Much of the center's research relies on data from NASA's Gravity Recovery and Climate Experiment (GRACE). This data is used to follow changes in freshwater availability in aquifers and river basins, which allows the center to track groundwater depletion throughout California. Through GRACE satellite data, the UCCHM team has found evidence of global groundwater depletion.

The center was founded in 2009 by Director Jay Famiglietti. In addition to his position as director of the UCCHM, Famiglietti holds faculty appointments at the University of California, Irvine as a professor of earth system science and civil and environmental engineering. Famiglietti is a leader in the field of hydrology, and recently starred in the film, Last Call at the Oasis, a documentary about the global depletion of water resources. The center is partnered with +H2O and Freewaters, organizations focused on water sustainability on a global scale and universal access to clean drinking water.
