= Katerina Lemmel =

German Patrician and Bridgettine nun (1466–1533)

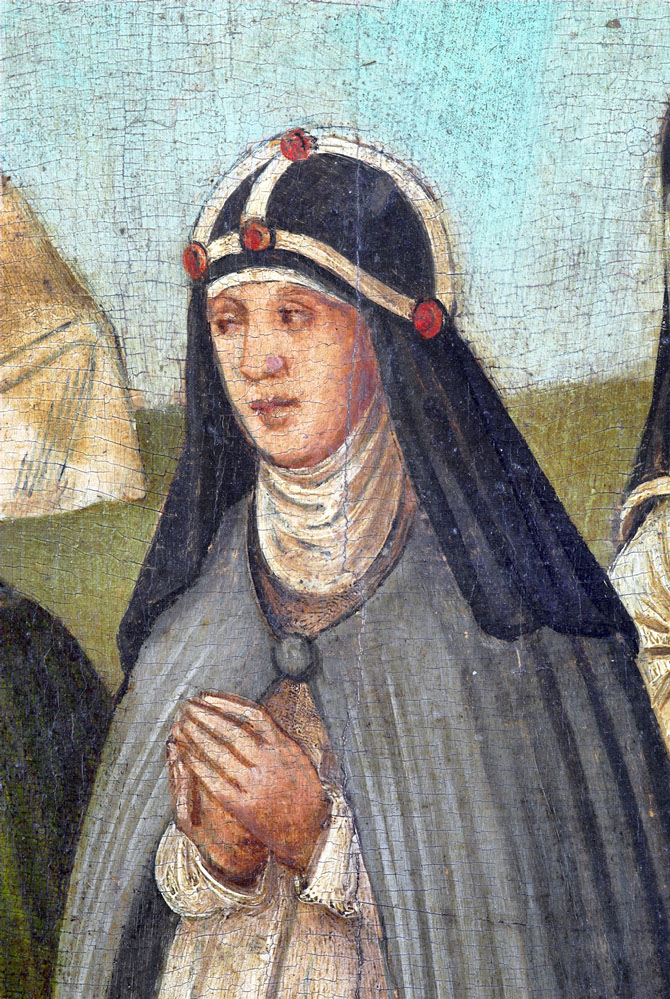
Katerina Lemmel in the religious habit of a Birgittine, Imhoff-Tetzel-Holzschuher Epitaph in St. Sebaldus Church, Nuremberg

Katerina Lemmel, OSsS (née Imhoff; born 1466 in Nuremberg; died 28 March 1533 in Maihingen; also Katharina Lemmel or Katharina Lemlin) was a successful German patrician businesswoman in Nuremberg who became a Bridgettine nun at the monastery of Maria Mai in Maihingen in the Nördlinger Ries. A collection of letters that she wrote from the monastery to her relatives in Nuremberg permits multifaceted insights into life in a late-medieval female monastery and into its system of spiritual economies.

== Years in Nuremberg ==
Katerina was born the third child of Paulus Imhoff and Ursula Holzschuher Imhoff. Both her parents came from important patrician families. The Nuremberg patriciate formed the thin governing crust of the imperial city that consisted of about forty families. At the age of eighteen, Katerina Imhoff married the Bamberg patrician and businessman Michel Lemmel who soon took up Nuremberg citizenship. In her years in Nuremberg, Katerina Lemmel became a successful businesswoman holding investments in profitable enterprises ranging from real estate and metal production to agriculture and viticulture. As a member of the Imhoff family she also participated as a silent partner in the family company that imported saffron, pepper, ginger, cinnamon and other more exotic spices from Mediterranean countries but also – through a joint venture with King Manuel I of Portugal – directly from India. When Lemmel was fifty years old, her husband died, leaving her with two socially acceptable options: to remain in Nuremberg and marry into another successful patrician merchant family or to leave the world for a monastery and become a bride of Christ. Against the will of her family, Katerina Lemmel chose the latter and entered the monastery of Maria Mai in the year 1516.

== Katerina Lemmel at the monastery Maria Mai ==
The Bridgettines in south Germany welcomed urban patrician women. Katerina Lemmel had become familiar with Birgittine writings already in Nuremberg. The Revelations of Bridget of Sweden and other devotional texts were read not only in the local women's monasteries but also by women in the world, and thus generally impacted spirituality and encouraged women's self-determination. The attitudes Lemmel expresses suggest that she may have wished to avoid the monasteries in and near Nuremberg, which were under the close scrutiny of male trustees from the City Council. As an astute, knowledgeable, and experienced businesswoman, Lemmel could continue many of her mercantile endeavors. This included not only managing the funds she had brought with her when she professed, but also negotiating donations by assuring prayers and memorials in exchange for support in the form of funding, furnishings, commodities, services, and favors. Katerina Lemmel brought a substantial amount of her own capital with her to Maria Mai. She used the funds immediately to improve, remodel and complete the nun's cloister and several adjacent structures. For her remaining financial resources, she sought profitable but secure investment opportunities. Lemmel's ongoing efforts to solicit donations of stained glass panels for the glazing of the cloister continued throughout much of her correspondence. Finally by 1519 a narrative cycle focusing on the Passion of Christ was completed by the famous Hirsvogel workshop of Nuremberg and installed at Maria Mai. The nuns, however, had little time to make use of their windows: during the German Peasants' War of 1525 angry rebels stormed the monastery, forcing the nuns to flee to the town of Oettingen. Upon their return after the uprising was squelched, the women found large parts of their monastery and properties had been destroyed and plundered. By that time many of the merchant cities of South Germany, among them Nuremberg, had adopted the Lutheran Reformation thus depriving the nuns of one of their major sources of support. Maria Mai never returned to its former splendor. Katerina Lemmel died in Maihingen in the year 1533. A short passage about her life and description of her death was entered in the House Book of Maria Mai.

== Letters ==
Fifty-eight letters written by Katerina Lemmel from the monastery of Maria Mai have survived in the Imhoff family archives, now on permanent loan in the Historisches Archiv of the Germanisches Nationalmuseum in Nuremberg. Nearly all of the letters are addressed to Katerina Lemmel's cousin, the Nuremberg merchant and banker Hans V Imhoff, a leading executive of the famous Imhoff Brothers Trading Company and member of the Nuremberg city council. The intense communication with Hans lasted six years ending with Hans's death in 1522. The letters written to her friends and relatives provide a wealth of first-hand information about life, money and spirituality in a Birgittine monastery. The primary purpose of the missives was clearly financial: Imhoff administered funds that remained in Nuremberg, and Lemmel regularly informed him how to use the interest income. Often these funds were used to purchase goods in Nuremberg for the monastery. In some cases detailed shopping lists for spices and other items were included. For Katerina Lemmel the correspondence became a window to the world, since the strict claustration of the nuns severely restricted oral communication with anyone outside of the enclosure. Beyond financial decisions, the topics discussed in the letters ranged from practical difficulties in transportation, communication and banking, to medical matters, to family events and gossip (births and marriages, illness and death, controversies and misunderstandings), to local Nuremberg news, to major religious and political issues of the day. Individuals mentioned include Veronica Fugger, Christoph Fürer, Veit Hirsvogel the Elder, Christoph Kress, Emperor Maximilian I, and Willibald Pirckheimer.

== Bibliography ==
=== Editions and Translations ===
- Volker Schier, Corine Schleif, and Anne Simon (2019), Pepper for Prayer: The Correspondence of the Birgittine Nun Katerina Lemmel, 1516–1525, Edition and Translation, Stockholm: Runica et Mediaevalia. ISBN 978-91-88568-76-2
- Corine Schleif and Volker Schier (2009), Katerina’s Windows: Donation and Devotion, Art and Music, as Heard and Seen Through the Writings of a Birgittine Nun, University Park: Penn State Press. ISBN 978-0-271-03369-3. Contains an English translation of the letters and other sources integrated with extensive narrative commentary. Reviews by Hans van Miegroet in Choice (April 2010); Roger Rosewell in Vidimus 36 (January 2010); Jeffrey Chipps Smith in Renaissance Quarterly 63.2 (2010), 611–13; Stanley Weed in The Medieval Review 2010–10; Megan Cassidy-Welch in Burlington Magazine 152 (November 2010), 746; Judith Oliver in Speculum 86 (2011), 546–48; Pia F. Cuneo in Mediaevistik: Internationale Zeitschrift für interdisziplinäre Mittelalterforschung 24 (2011), 586–89.
- Johann Kamann (1899–1900),“Briefe aus dem Brigittenkloster: Maihingen (Maria = Mai) im Ries 1516-1522,” Zeitschrift für Kulturgeschichte 6 (1899), 249–27, 385–410; 7 (1900), 170–99. Contains a partial edition that does not meet today's scholarly standards.

=== Books and articles ===
- Corine Schleif (2013), “The Art of Walking and Viewing: Christ, the Virgin, Saint Birgitta, and the Birgittines Processing through the Cloister,” in The Birgittine Experience: Papers from the Birgitta Conference in Stockholm 2011, ed. Claes Gejrot, Mia Akestam and Roger Anderson, Stockholm, 241–267. ISBN 978-91-7402-417-3
- Volker Schier (2010), “Probing the Mystery of the Use of Saffron in Medieval Nunneries,” The Senses & Society 5: 57–72.
- Hans-Dietrich Lemmel (2008), "Die Nürnberger Lemmel in der Oberpfalz", Genealogisches Jahrbuch Band 45/46 (2008) S.87-158, Kapitel 6.2: Katerina Lemlin
- Volker Schier (2006), “The Cantus Sororum: Nuns Singing for Their Supper, Singing for Saffron, Singing for Salvation,” in Papers Read at the 12th Meeting of the IMS Study Group Cantus Planus, Lillafüred/Hungary 2004, Aug. 23–28, ed. László Dobszay, Budapest, 857–70. ISBN 978-963-7074-91-2
- Corine Schleif and Volker Schier (2005), “Views and Voices From Within: Sister Katerina Lemmel on the Glazing of the Cloister at Maria Mai,” in Glasmalerei im Kontext: Bildprogramme und Raumfunktionen: Akten des 22. Internationalen Colloquiums des Corpus Vitrearum Nürnberg, 29. August–1. September 2004, ed. Rüdiger Becksmann, Anzeiger des Germanischen Nationalmuseums, wissenschaftlicher Beiband 25, Nuremberg: Germanisches Nationalmuseum, 211–28. ISBN 978-3-936688-12-2
- Corine Schleif (2005), “Forgotten Roles of Women as Donors: Sister Katerina Lemmel’s Negotiated Exchanges in the Care for the Here and the Hereafter,” in Care for the Here and the Hereafter: Memoria, Art, and Ritual in the Middle Ages, ed. Truus van Bueren, Turnhout: Brepols, 137–54. ISBN 978-2-503-51508-3
- Corine Schleif (2003), “Katerina Lemmels Briefe als Spiegel Nürnberger Privatfrömmigkeit,” in Im Zeichen des Christkinds: Privates Bild und Frömmigkeit im Spätmittelalter: Ergebnisse der Ausstellung Spiegel der Seligkeit, ed. Frank Matthias Kammel, Nuremberg: Germanisches Nationalmuseum, 109–12. ISBN 978-3-926982-84-1
- Britta-Juliane Kruse (2002), “Eine Witwe als Mäzenin: Briefe und Urkunden zum Aufenthalt der Nürnberger Patrizierin Katharina Lemlin im Birgittenkloster Maria Mai (Maihingen),” in Literarische Leben: Rollenentwürfe in der Literatur des Hoch- und Spätmittelalters, ed. Matthias Meyer and Hans-Jochen Schiewer, Tübingen: Niemeyer, 465– 506. ISBN 978-3-484-64021-4
- Tore Nyberg (1972–1974), Dokumente und Untersuchungen zur inneren Geschichte der drei Birgittenklöster Bayerns, 1420–1570, 2 vols, Munich: Beck. ISBN 978-3-406-10382-7
- Georg Grupp (1896), “Maihinger Brigittinerinnen aus Nürnberg,” Mitteilungen des Vereins für Geschichte der Stadt Nürnberg 13: 79–97
