= Corine Schleif =

Professor and art historian

Corine Schleif (February 20, 1949 – December 8, 2023) was a professor and art historian who researched, taught and wrote about Medieval art, Renaissance art, feminist art theory, and the motivations behind the creating and destroying of art. She was faculty at Arizona State University's School of Art.

== Education and career ==
Corine Schleif studied art history at Marburg University and went on to Washington University in St. Louis to receive an M.A. in 1980. She then attended the Free University of Berlin with a Fulbright scholarship which was renewed at LMU Munich. She received her Doctorate (Dr. phil.) in art history (medieval history and religious studies minors) from University of Bamberg in 1986. In addition to being a professor at ASU's School of Art, she is an Affiliate Professor at the Arizona Center for Medieval and Renaissance Studies (ACMRS).

Schleif received the Berlin Prize from the American Academy as the John P. Birkelund Fellow in the Humanities for the Class of Spring 2016.

Schleif's recent work has included opening the Geese Book: "A multisensory work of the past is explored through multimedia technologies of the present. A team of experts headed by Volker Schier and Corine Schleif opens the Geese Book to scholars and provides a window for broader audiences." She and Schier also developed a Virtual reality (VR) experience called Extraordinary Sensescapes: The Sensual World of Late Medieval Nuns.

== Partial list of publications ==
For a more complete and detailed list, see her CV external link below.

- Volker Schier, Corine Schleif, and Anne Simon (2019), Pepper for Prayer: The Correspondence of the Birgittine Nun Katerina Lemmel, 1516–1525, Edition and Translation, Stockholm: Runica et Mediaevalia. ISBN 978-91-88568-76-2
- Corine Schleif (2018), Adam Kraft's Seven Falls of Christ: Walking the History of Emotions in Nuremberg. Video version (in two parts) of a presentation given in Melbourne in November 2016 and
- Corine Schleif and Volker Schier, eds., Manuscripts Changing Hands. Wiesbaden: Harrassowitz, 2016. ISBN 978-3447103916
- Corine Schleif (2013), “The Art of Walking and Viewing: Christ, the Virgin, Saint Birgitta, and the Birgittines Processing through the Cloister,” in The Birgittine Experience: Papers from the Birgitta Conference in Stockholm 2011, ed. Claes Gejrot, Mia Akestam and Roger Anderson, Stockholm, 241–267. ISBN 978-91-7402-417-3
- Corine Schleif (2010), "Albrecht Dürer between Agnes Frey and Willibald Pirckheimer," The Essential Dürer, ed. Larry Silver and Jeffrey Chipps Smith, Philadelphia, 85–205
- Corine Schleif and Volker Schier (2009), Katerina’s Windows: Donation and Devotion, Art and Music, as Heard and Seen Through the Writings of a Birgittine Nun, University Park: Penn State Press. ISBN 978-0-271-03369-3. Contains an English translation of the letters and other sources integrated with extensive narrative commentary. Reviews by Hans van Miegroet in Choice (April 2010); Roger Rosewell in Vidimus 36 (January 2010); Jeffrey Chipps Smith in Renaissance Quarterly 63.2 (2010), 611–13; Stanley Weed in The Medieval Review 2010–10; Megan Cassidy-Welch in Burlington Magazine 152 (November 2010), 746; Judith Oliver in Speculum 86 (2011), 546–48; Pia F. Cuneo in Mediaevistik: Internationale Zeitschrift für interdisziplinäre Mittelalterforschung 24 (2011), 586–89.
- Volker Schier and Corine Schleif. "The Holy Lance as Late Twentieth-century Subcultural Icon." Subcultural Icons, edited by Keyan Tomaselli and David Scott. Walnut Creek: Left Coast Press, 2009, 103–134.
- Corine Schleif and Volker Schier, Katerina's Windows: Donation and Devotion, Art and Music, as Heard and Seen Through the Writings of a Birgittine Nun, University Park: Penn State Press, 2009, 237, 242–244, ISBN 978-0-271-03369-3
- Volker Schier and Corine Schleif. "Die heilige und die unheilige Lanze. Von Richard Wagner bis zum World Wide Web [The Holy and the Unholy Lance. From Richard Wagner to the World Wide Web]." Die Heilige Lanze in Wien. Insignie - Reliquie - Schicksalsspeer, edited by Franz Kirchweger. Vienna: Kunsthistorisches Museum, 2005, 111–144.
- Corine Schleif (2005), “Forgotten Roles of Women as Donors: Sister Katerina Lemmel’s Negotiated Exchanges in the Care for the Here and the Hereafter,” in Care for the Here and the Hereafter: Memoria, Art, and Ritual in the Middle Ages, ed. Truus van Bueren, Turnhout: Brepols, 137–54. ISBN 978-2-503-51508-3
- Corine Schleif and Volker Schier (2005), “Views and Voices From Within: Sister Katerina Lemmel on the Glazing of the Cloister at Maria Mai,” in Glasmalerei im Kontext: Bildprogramme und Raumfunktionen: Akten des 22. Internationalen Colloquiums des Corpus Vitrearum Nürnberg, 29. August–1. September 2004, ed. Rüdiger Becksmann, Anzeiger des Germanischen Nationalmuseums, wissenschaftlicher Beiband 25, Nuremberg: Germanisches Nationalmuseum, 211–28. ISBN 978-3-936688-12-2
- Volker Schier and Corine Schleif. "Seeing and Singing, Touching and Tasting the Holy Lance. The Power and Politics of Embodied Religious Experiences in Nuremberg, 1424–1524." Signs of Change. Transformations of Christian Traditions and their Representation in the Arts, 1000–2000, edited by Nils Holger Petersen, Claus Cluver, and Nicolas Bell. Amsterdam – New York: Rodopi, 2004, 401–426.
- Corine Schleif (2003), “Katerina Lemmels Briefe als Spiegel Nürnberger Privatfrömmigkeit,” in Im Zeichen des Christkinds: Privates Bild und Frömmigkeit im Spätmittelalter: Ergebnisse der Ausstellung Spiegel der Seligkeit, ed. Frank Matthias Kammel, Nuremberg: Germanisches Nationalmuseum, 109–12. ISBN 978-3-926982-84-1
- Corine Schleif (1998), Chapter "The Role of Women in Challenging the Canon of 'Great Master' Art History" in Attending to Early Modern Women edited by Susan Dwyer Amussen and Adele F. Seeff
- Corine Schleif, Donatio et memoria. Stifter, Stiftungen und Motivationen an Beispielen aus der Lorenzkirche in Nürnberg. München: Deutscher Kunstverlag, 1990. ISBN 34220-60316

== See also ==
- Albrecht Dürer
- Holy Lance
- Katerina Lemmel
- Manuscript culture
- Pomander
- Willibald Pirckheimer
- Women in the art history field
