= Charlotta Ehrenpohl =

Swedish painter (1841–1914)

Charlotta Sophia "Lotten" Ehrenpohl (1841–1914), was a Swedish Bridgettines nun and painter.

She converted to Catholicism in 1875. In 1877, she entered to Brigettine convent Maria Haart in Weert in the Netherlands. She became known as a painter, making religious paintings for churches and convents.
