= Marina de Escobar =

Spanish Catholic mystic (1554–1633)

Venerable Marina de Escobar
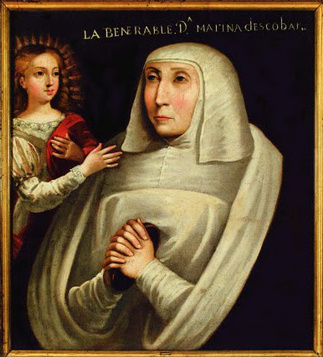
- Portrait, 17th century

Personal life
- Born: 8 February 1554 Valladolid, Spain
- Died: 9 June 1633 (aged 79) Valladolid, Spain
- Parents: Diego de Escobar (father); Margaret Montana (mother)

Religious life
- Religion: Catholic

Marina de Escobar Montaña (8 February 1554 – 9 June 1633) was a Spanish Catholic mystic of the Counter-Reformation era. Restricted in her activity due to poor health, she devoted herself to prayer and contemplation under the guidance of her Jesuit confessors and spiritual advisors. Marina experienced visions of a number of saints, and within her lifetime she acquired a reputation throughout Spain as a holy woman, especially in her home city of Valladolid.

Despite taking a vow of chastity, spending her life in prayer and service, and gathering a small community of other women around her, Marina never joined a religious order. After a 1615 vision, she worked to found a modified branch of the Brigittine Order, but died before she herself could join it. She was popularly venerated after her death, and her confessor, Luis de la Puente, collected and prepared her accounts of her spiritual experiences. After a lengthy investigation by the Spanish Inquisition, these were published, and Marina was declared venerable.

== Life ==
=== Childhood ===
Marina was born in Valladolid, Spain, on 8 February 1554. Her father, Diego de Escobar, was a professor of civil and canon law, a lawyer in the Royal Chancellery of Granada, and, for a time, governor of Osuna; her mother was Margaret Montaña, daughter of the Emperor Charles V's physician. Marina was their fourth daughter; her parents had hoped for a boy.

Between the ages of one and nine, Marina lived with her grandmother. After she returned to living with her parents, her father criticized her for taking care with her appearance and for insufficient asceticism. About this time, Marina made friends with another young girl, who influenced her away from the intense devotion her family cultivated. Her father, displeased, chose her a confessor who pushed her towards greater austerity.

Starting from the age of fourteen, Marina suffered from a severe illness, which some modern biographers suggest may have been schizophrenia. She experienced depression and dissociation, as well as frequent visions.

=== Adult life ===
Marina repeatedly indicated interest in joining a religious order, beginning as early as 1568, when she met Teresa of Avila. Teresa discouraged Marina's ambition to join one of her discalced Carmelite convents, reportedly saying: "Come now, daughter, you don’t have to be a nun since God wants you for great things from the corner of your house." Later, in 1604, Marina spoke to Mariana de San José about her desire to join Mariana's Augustinian convent, but was unable to do so due to her health. In a 1621 vision, Marina reported that Ignatius of Loyola appeared to her, telling her that he adopted her as a member of the Society of Jesus and clothed her in the habit of the order.

In fact, although she devoted her life to religion, making a vow of chastity and taking frequent communion, Marina remained in her family home in Valladolid for most of her life. There she gathered around her a circle of friends and followers, including another local mystic, Luisa Carvajal y Mendoza. She became popularly known as a holy woman, and corresponded with large numbers of people throughout Spain.

In 1603, Marina moved into an apartment owned by her family, accompanied by two servants. There, although bedridden after a 1603 accident, she gradually accumulated a group of about twenty women, engaged in making clothing for the poor and teaching the younger girls. In 1615, a vision of Bridget of Sweden instructed Marina to found a branch of the Brigittine order, which Marina called the Recollects. Marina prepared a modified Rule for her convent, which was approved by Urban VIII. While she died before finishing this project, it was continued after her death by Mariana de San José, and the convent opened in 1637.

Marina's funeral, in 1633, was widely attended, and she was honored by an elaborate funeral procession.

== Veneration ==
The cause for her beatification was opened on 29 December 1691, granting her the title of Servant of God. She was later declared Venerable.

== Spirituality ==
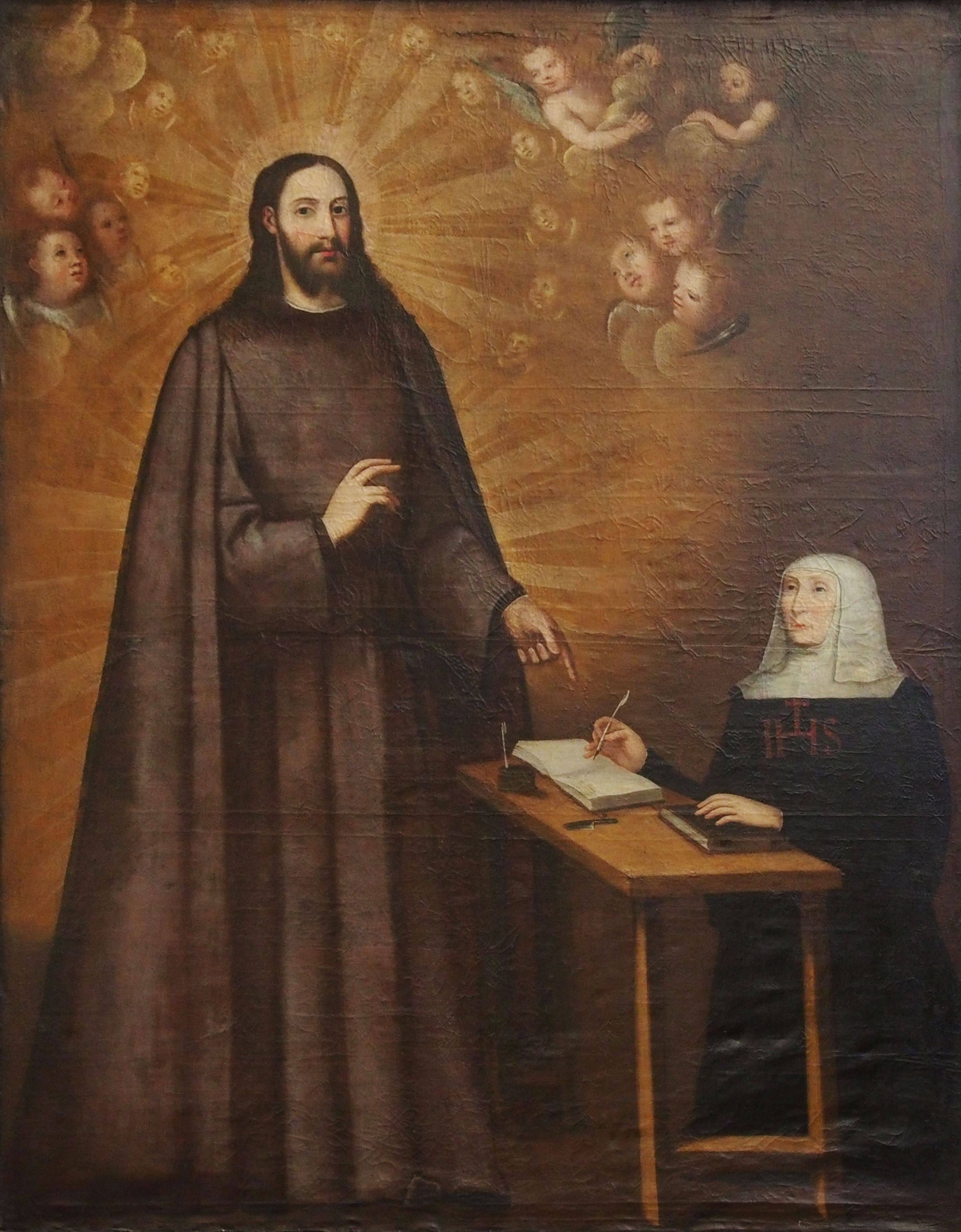
Christ, in the religious habit of a Jesuit, speaks to Marina de Escobar

Like her parents, Marina generally turned to the local Jesuits for spiritual advice. The most prominent among her advisors were the brothers Andrés and Luis de la Puente; others included Miguel de Oreña (rector of the Colegio de San Ambrosio), Antonio de Leon, and Balthazar Alvarez.

Antonio de Leon encouraged Marina to practice recogimiento, a form of mental prayer associated with the Franciscan order, while discouraging her from becoming involved with related practices associated with the heretical Alumbrados. Luis de la Puente shared with her his devotion to the Sacred Heart.

Marina experienced visions of saints including Bridget of Sweden, Gertrude the Great, Matilda of Ringelheim, Ignatius of Loyola, Bernard of Clairvaux, Saint Dominic, Francis of Assisi, and the Virgin Mary, as well as of people she had known personally before their death, such as her five-year-old niece Maria Hermandez. While sometimes comforting, her visions were often harsh and demanding, such as one in which Christ had her guardian angel beat her as punishment.

== Writings ==
Marina, whose health made it difficult for her to write, dictated accounts of her visions to the de la Puente brothers and to a secretary. Luis de la Puente organized the writings and prepared them for publication. The collected writings were brought before the Spanish Inquisition under suspicion of heresy; it was suggested that Marina might be exhibiting alumbradismo or Quietism, and that her visions might not have been authentic. As a result of this controversy, the causes for beatification of both Marina and Luis de la Puente were delayed for decades. Jean Tanner, a Jesuit priest in Prague, published two influential works arguing for Marina's orthodoxy.

The compiled edition of Marina's life and writings was eventually published at Madrid in 1664; a continuation by Pinto Ramírez followed in 1673. It was translated into Latin by M. Hanel, S.J., and published again at Prague in 1672–1688, and in an enlarged edition at Naples 1690. A German translation in four volumes appeared in 1861. Although often published in one large volume, the work is divided into six books, on the following topics:

1. God's guidance
2. The mysteries of redemption
3. The Trinity
4. Guardian angels and the Virgin Mary
5. Helping souls in purgatory and on earth
6. Marina's own sufferings

Other topics discussed include the practice of daily communion, mystic espousals, internal stigmata, and various saints. Edward Graham, in the Catholic Encyclopedia, describes the writing as "free and flowing", and Marina's style as displaying "simplicity and naïve frankness". On the other hand, de la Puente describes Marina's writing as "wordy and sloppy; she repeats something several times in order to make herself understood, and with too many words."
