= Luis de la Puente =

Spanish Jesuit (1554–1624)

Venerable Luis de la Puente SJ
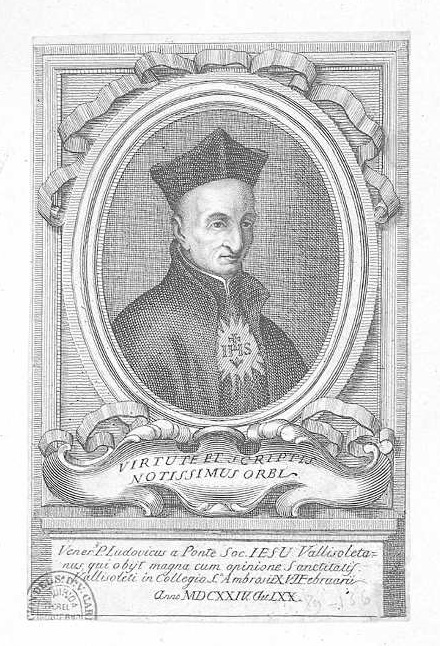
- Portrait of Luis de la Puente
- Born: 11 November 1574; Valladolid, Spain
- Died: 16 February 1624 (aged 49); Valladolid
- Venerated in: Roman Catholic Church
- Feast: 16 February (Jesuits)

Luis de la Puente SJ (also D'Aponte, de Ponte, Dupont) (11 November 1554 – 16 February 1624) was a Spanish Jesuit theologian and ascetic writer. He was one of the most esteemed ascetical writer of the seventeenth and eighteenth centuries. A few years after his death, the Sacred Congregation of Rites admitted the cause of his beatification and canonization.

== Life ==
Puente was born in Valladolid, the son of Alonso de la Puente, an official of the Chancery, and María Vázquez. At the age of thirteen, he started at the university and obtained a bachelor of arts in 1572. He then attended the Dominican Colegio de San Gregorio.

Although his brothers became Dominicans, Luis chose to enter the Society of Jesus. He began to attend lectures at the Jesuit college given by Francisco Suarez. In December 1574 he entered the Jesuit novitiate at Medina del Campo, where he took his first vows. In 1576 he resumed his studies in Valladolid at the Colegio de San Ambrosio. In 1578 he spent a year at the University of the Holy Spirit, in Guipúzcoa preparing for future teaching work. He spent his tertianship in Villagarcía de Campos.

He was ordained priest in March 1580 at the Colegio de San Ambrosio. Between 1581 and 1584 he was a reader of Arts at the College of León. He worked in preaching, in teaching Christian doctrine and, most especially, as a confessor. Luis de la Puente began to be more a spiritual director than a teacher. He became the spiritual director of Marina de Escobar. From the end of 1585 to the end of 1589, La Puente was effectively responsible for the training of the Jesuit novices at Villagarcía. In 1589 he returned briefly to Valladolid, and was sent the following year to the College of Salamanca, to serve as prefect. He professed his four vows in January 1593.

In 1598 La Puente was commissioned by the superior general, Claudio Aquaviva, to be inspector of different schools in Castile. In 1599 he devoted himself to the care of the plague-stricken in Villagarcia. He was appointed visitor or inspector of the English College of St. Alban. Much of his work as visitor involved resolving various conflicts at the institutions. As his health was never strong, La Puente had to relinquish his heavy administration burden as rector to become prefect of studies in 1602.

He died in Valladolid.

== Theology ==
The 1913 Catholic Encyclopedia praises de la Puente's writings as "replete with practical spirituality", describing him as "among the most eminent masters of asceticism". Historian Robert Ricard calls him "the architect of a practical theology of spiritual guidance that incorporated different strains of Augustinianism and Thomism with Dionysian mystical theology."

== Veneration ==
The cause for de la Puente was formally opened on 4 October 1667, granting him the title of Servant of God. He was declared Venerable by Pope Clement XIII on 16 July 1759.

== Works ==
La Puente largely dedicated the last sixteen years of his life to writing. Besides a commentary in Latin on the Canticle of Canticles, he wrote (in Spanish):

- "Life of Father Baltasar Alvarez" (Vida del P. Baltasar Alvarez. Madrid 1615; Vita P. Balthassaris Alvarez. Coloniae 1616 );
- "Life of Marina de Escobar";
- "Spiritual Directory for Confession, Communion and the Sacrifice of the Mass";
- "The Christian Life" (4 vols.), and
- "Meditations on the Mysteries of Our Holy Faith", by which he is best known.
- "On the perfection of various states of life," (The following links are in Spanish)

Volume One
Volume Two: Of the Sacraments of Baptism and Confirmation and the Perfection practiced in them
Volume Three: On Virginity and religion and following the Counsels
Volume Three: On the States, Offices, and Ministries of Church Hierarchy
