= Agnes Dürer =

German woman, wife of Albrecht Dürer

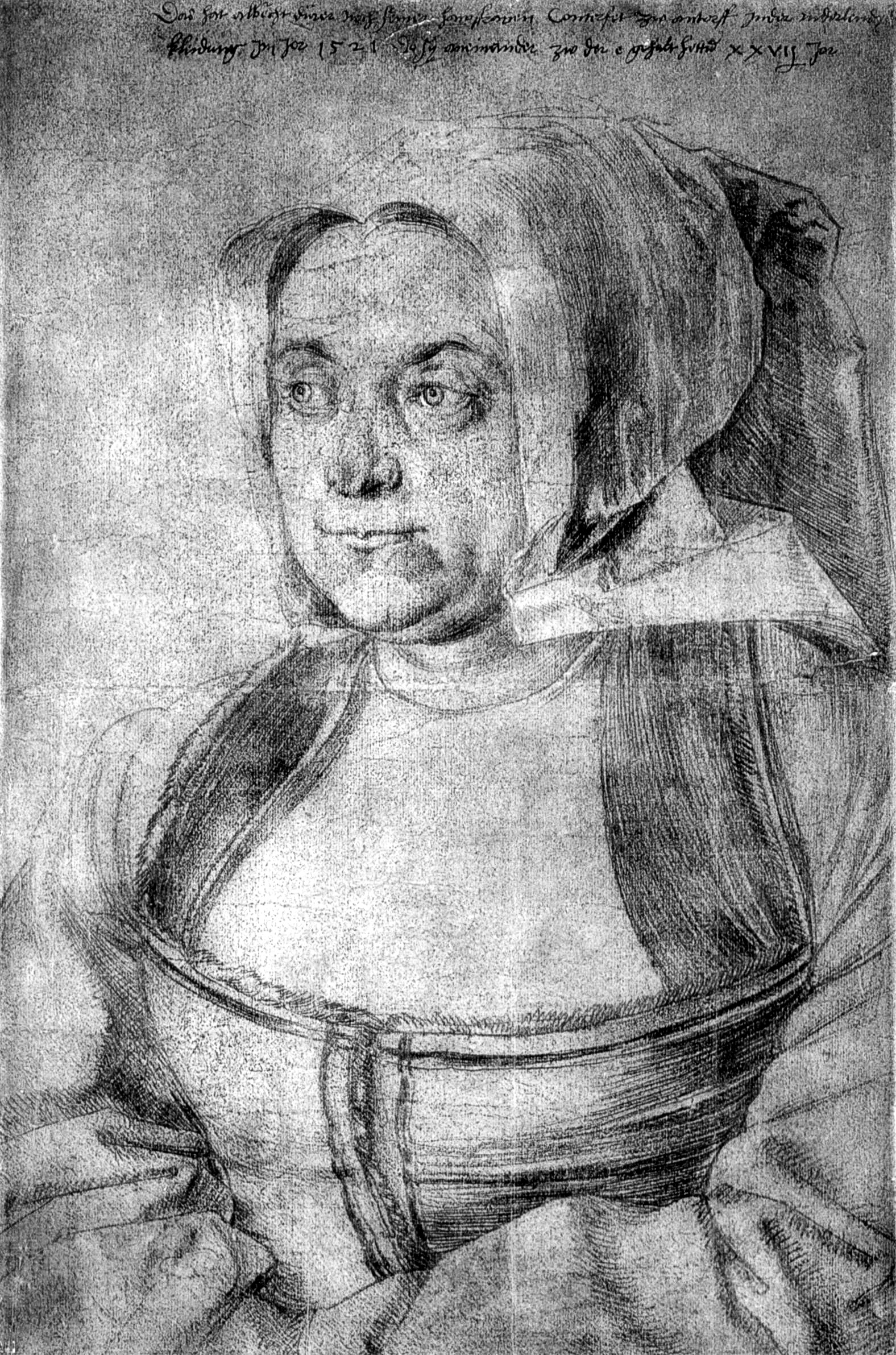
- Portrait by Albrecht Dürer, her husband, 1521
- Born: 1475; Nuremberg, Holy Roman Empire
- Died: December 28, 1539 (aged 63–64); Nuremberg, Holy Roman Empire
- Spouse: Albrecht Dürer (m. 1494; died 1528)

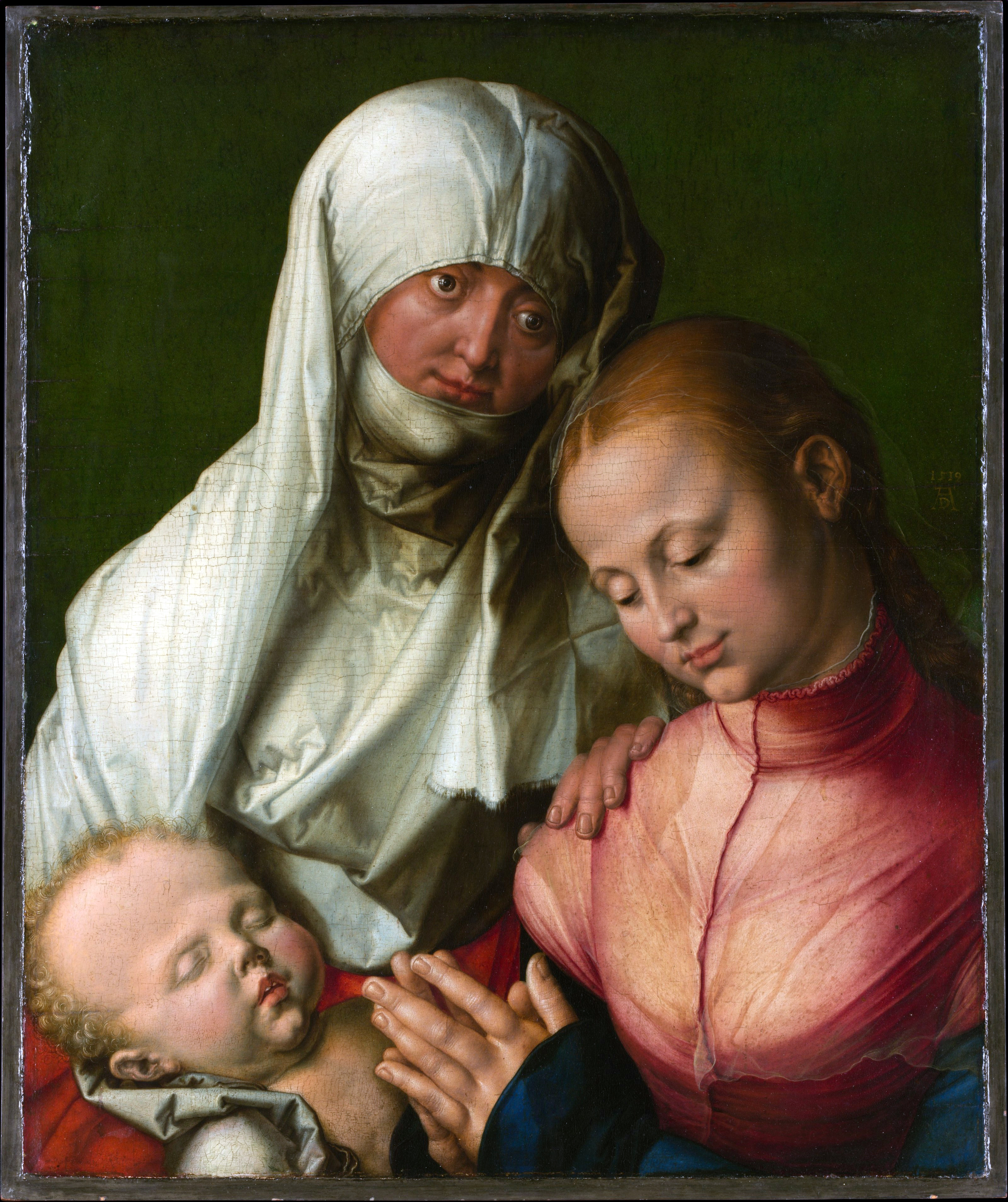
Anna trio: Agnes Dürer was the model for Anna (with headscarf), 1519, Metropolitan Museum of Art, New York

Agnes Dürer née Frey (1475– December 28, 1539) was a Nuremburger business woman, as well as the wife of German artist Albrecht Dürer. During their marriage she was portrayed several times by Dürer.

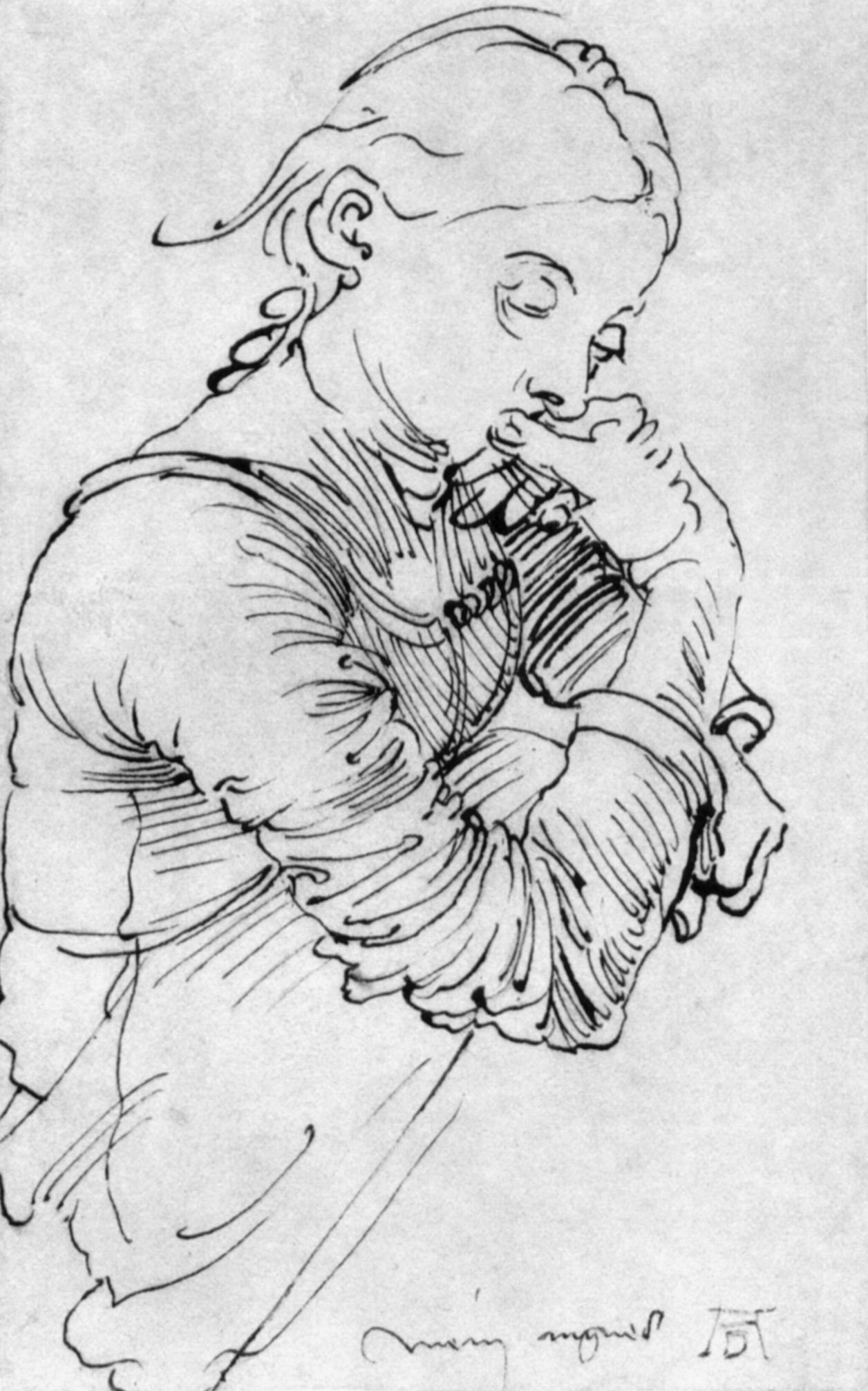
My Agnes, drawing by Albrecht Dürer, 1494

== Life and Marriage ==
Agnes Frey was born in Nuremberg in 1475 to Anna and Hans Frey. Her mother was a member of the patrician family Rummel, and her father was a copper smith and lute maker.

On July 7, 1494, aged 19 or 20, Agnes married Albrecht Dürer, at the St. Sebaldus church in Nuremberg. According to Dürer's family chronicle, the marriage had been arranged by their fathers, and Agnes had a dowry of 200 guilders, which later aided him in purchasing the house that would become the Dürer workshop.

The first known drawing of Agnes by Albrecht is from 1494, around the time of their wedding, a sketch of her sitting at a table which he captioned "Mein Agnes" (My Agnes). Agnes was very involved in the marketing and selling of her husband's prints as well as management of the home-based workshop. She regularly visited fairs in order to sell his engravings, but usually sold his prints at the Nuremberg weekly market. Her and Albrecht's participation in fairs at Leipzig and Frankfurt is also documented. It was common for Agnes to travel to sell her husband's work on her own, being so independent in travel that sometimes Albrecht was not informed about her plans or location. From September 1505 until May 1506 she did not return to her hometown from a visit to Frankfurt, probably because plague had broken out in Nuremberg.

Through her frequent travel and involvement in selling her husband's work, Agnes became widely known and liked, with some buyers being more familiar with her than with Albrecht, and with her personally corresponding with many ofther artists Albrecht worked with or was befriended with. She often received, and expected, payment for her involvement and work, and received this payment sometimes in the form of clothing or other material gifts, but also often in the form of monetary pay. When the town council of Nuremberg accepted a diptych paining from Dürer showcasing the Four Apostles, their payment included 12 guilders meant for Agnes, a clear acknowledgement of her work.

Agnes was also involved in the maintenance and running of the Dürer-house workshop, which included the employees and apprentices working there. This is shown by the fact that the workshop continued to be productive while Albrecht was away on trips, productivity that could have only happened with the permission and guidance of Agnes. This includes Albrecht's second journey to Italy, which spanned from 1505 to 1507.

In the years 1520 and 1521 the couple traveled together in the Netherlands. The last known portrait of her, which was painted on their 27th wedding anniversary, was from this period.

The marriage between Agnes and Albrecht was childless. This has fueled the notion that their marriage was unhappy; however, most of the evidence for this stems from Willibald Pirckheimer, a man Albrecht was befriended with who was very clear about his dislike for Agnes. Some historians have also suggested that there was some form of romantic relationship occurring between Albrecht Dürer and Pirckheimer, which, although unconfirmed, would explain Pirckheimer's related accusations that Agnes was a bad, controlling wife who drove Albrecht to an early death. Modern scholars have dismissed this characterization.

Albrecht Dürer died in 1528, leaving his estate to Agnes Dürer, who continued to sell his work. This was confirmed by Charles V, Holy Roman Emperor in 1528 with his purchase of Dürer's book Of Human Proportions. She died on December 28, 1539, aged 63 or 64, in Nuremberg.

== Legacy ==
In 1828 a cobblestone street in Nuremberg was named "Agnesgasse" after Agnes Dürer. The street sits between Albrecht Dürer-Staße and Albrecht Dürer-Platz in Nuremberg's historical town centre. The home she shared with Dürer has also been converted into a museum, where tours are led by Agnes' character.

== Literature ==
- Hans Rupprich (ed. ): Dürer Written papers. Volume 1, autobiographical writings, correspondence, seals, inscriptions, notes and reports, certificates for personal life, German Association for the Arts, Berlin 1956
- Albrecht Durer: The Complete Works The Complete Paintings, drawings, engravings and woodcuts. The monograph "Albrecht Dürer, work and impact" by Fyodor Anzelewsky. Changed edition, Direct Media Publ, Berlin 2000, 1 CD-ROM (Digital Library; 28th) ISBN 3-89853-128-7
- Corine Schleif: "Das pos weyb Agnes Frey Dürer: Geschichte ihrer Verleumdung und Versuche der Ehrenrettung," ("The Bad Wife Agnes Frey Dürer: History of her Defamation and Attempts at her Rehabilitation"), in: Mitteilungen des Vereins für Geschichte der Stadt Nürnberg 86 (1999), 47-79
- Corine Schleif: "Agnes Frey Dürer, verpackt in Bildern und vereinnahmt in Geschichten," ("Agnes Frey Dürer, Packaged in Pictures and Appropriated in Stories"), in: Am Anfang war Sigena. Ein Nürnberger Frauengeschichtsbuch, edited by Gaby Franger and Nadja Bennewitz, Cadolzburg 1999, 2000, 67-77
- Corine Schleif: "Albrecht Dürer between Agnes Frey and Willibald Pirckheimer," in: The Essential Dürer, ed. Larry Silver and Jeffrey Chipps Smith, Philadelphia 2010, 85–205
