= Bridgettines =

Religious order

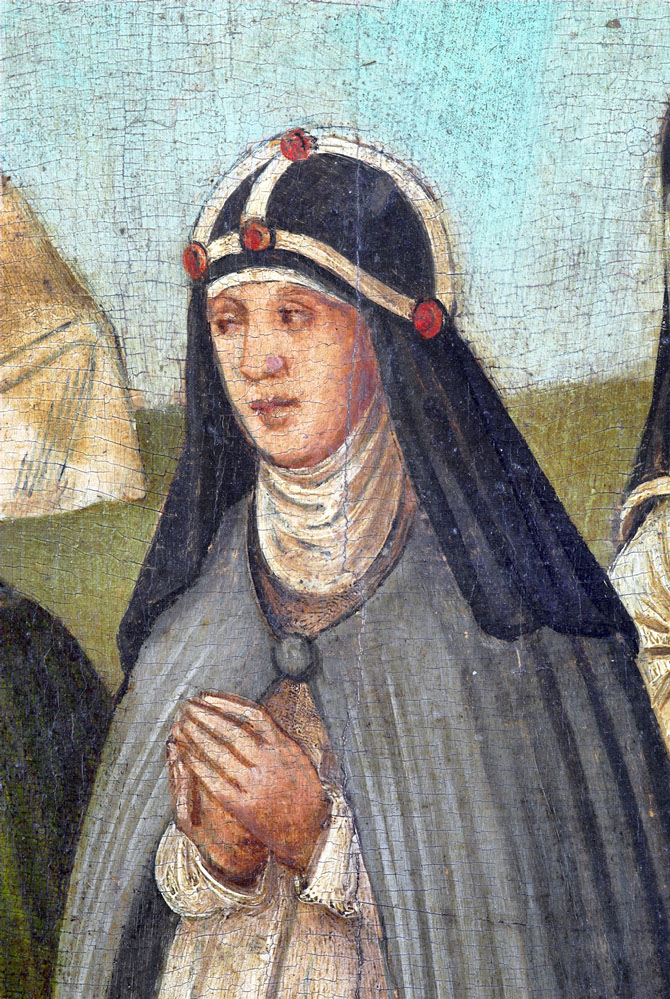
Habit of the professed Bridgettine nuns with the typical crown of linen on the veil

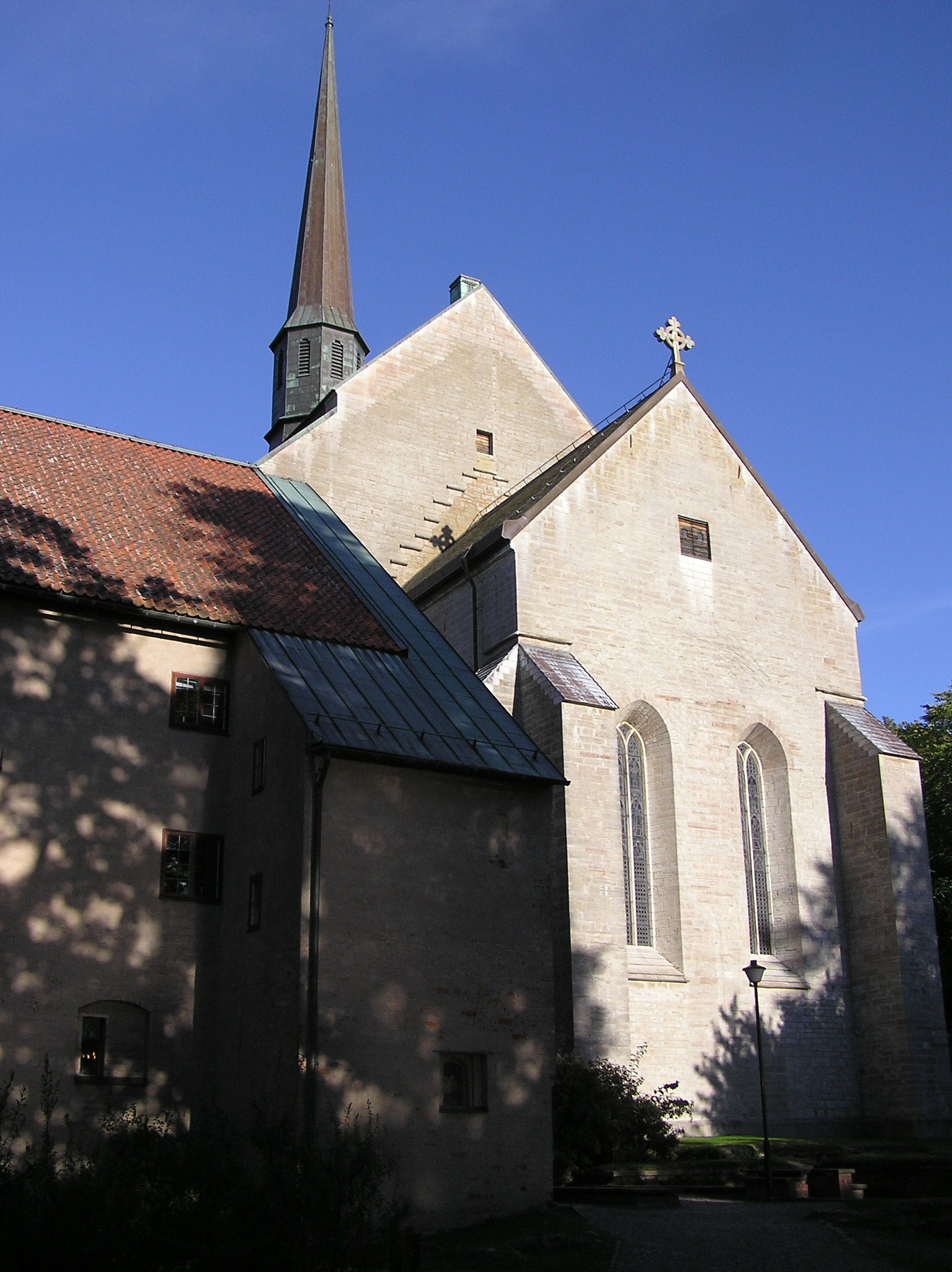
Convent church of the Pax Mariae abbey in Vadstena, the first Bridgettine monastery of the old branch

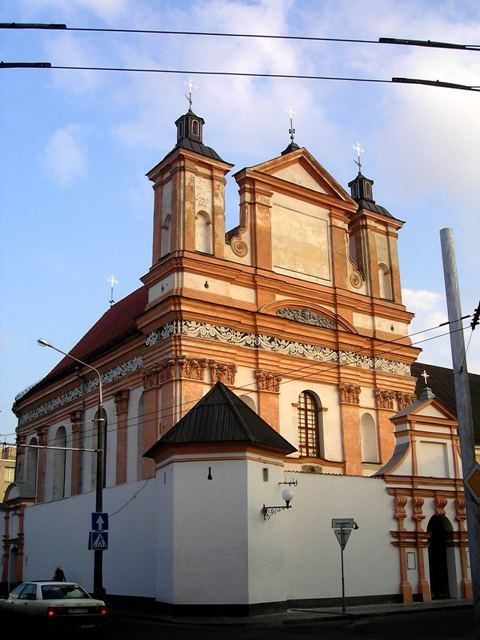
Bridgettine monastery in Hrodna, Belarus

The Bridgettines, or Birgittines, formally known as the Order of the Most Holy Saviour (Latin: Ordo Sanctissimi Salvatoris; abbreviated OSsS), is a monastic religious order of the Catholic Church founded by Saint Bridget of Sweden in 1344 and approved by Pope Urban V in 1370. They follow the Rule of Saint Augustine. There are today several different branches of Bridgettines.

== History ==
The first monastery of the order was founded in 1369 at the former royal castle of Vadstena.

St. Bridget's granddaughter, Lady Ingegerd Knutsdotter, was Abbess of Vadstena from 1385 to 1403. Upon her death on 14 September 1412, direct descent from St. Bridget became extinct. This opened the medieval concept of "Bridget's spiritual children", members of the order founded by her, to be her true heirs.

The order spread widely in Sweden and Norway, and played a remarkable part in promoting culture and literature in Scandinavia; this is to be attributed to the fact that the motherhouse at Vadstena, by Lake Vättern, was not suppressed till 1595 even though the Protestant Reformation had been widespread in Scandinavia. By 1515, with significant royal patronage, there were 27 houses, 13 of them in Scandinavia. Bridgettine houses soon spread into other lands, reaching an eventual total of 80.

In England, the Bridgettine monastery of Syon Abbey at Isleworth, Middlesex, was founded and royally endowed by King Henry V in 1415, and became one of the most fervent, most influential, and materially best endowed religious communities in the country until its Dissolution under King Henry VIII. One of the monks of the community, Richard Reynolds, O.Ss.S., was among the first members of the English clergy to be executed as a traitor for his refusal to accept the Oath of Supremacy. He was canonized as a martyr by Pope Paul VI in 1970.

Syon Abbey was among the few religious houses restored during Queen Mary I's reign (1553–1558), when nearly twenty members of the old community were re-established there in 1557. Upon the accession of Queen Elizabeth I and the ensuing persecution of Catholics by the English Crown, the Bridgettine monastic community left England, first for the Low Countries, then, after many vicissitudes, to Rouen in France, and finally, in 1594, to Lisbon.

One of the exiled community's recruits during Elizabeth's reign was Elizabeth Sander, known as a writer. She returned to England in 1578 only to be imprisoned and then escaped in 1580. She was to escape from imprisonment in Winchester Castle before she surrendered. She eventually returned to her community in Lisbon, where she died. The community remained in Lisbon (where the last monk of the community died), recruiting new members from England, until 1861, when they returned to England.

Syon Abbey in Devon continued as the only English religious community that had existed without interruption since pre-Reformation times. In 2004 the surviving medieval books of the monastic library were entrusted for safekeeping to the University of Exeter. Among the texts preserved was the Showing of Love by Julian of Norwich and The Orcherd of Syon, which translated Catherine of Siena's Dialogue. Syon Abbey's Tudor gatepost in marble, on which parts of St Richard Reynolds' body were placed, was brought by the nuns into their exile and then returned with them to England. This was later given to the Church of the Blessed Sacrament in Exeter.

Virtually all the Northern European Bridgettine monasteries (the bulk of the order) were destroyed during the Reformation.

== Currently active branches ==
As of 2013 there were 800 members. The distinctive part of the Bridgettine veil for the professed sisters is the crown, called the "Crown of the Five Holy Wounds". It has five red marks, one at each joint, to recall the Five Wounds of Christ on the Cross. The monks wear a red cross with the image of a Eucharistic host at the center on the right breast of their cloak. The order has its own proper Rite for the Canonical Hours, called the Office of Our Lady. Most houses of the order support themselves by providing bed and breakfast hospitality to guests at standard industry rates.

=== Medieval branch ===
The original medieval branch today consists of four independent monasteries:

- Maria Refugie Abbey in Uden, Netherlands
- Syon Abbey in Isleworth, England (abandoned in 2011)
- Birgittakloster in Altomünster Germany (abandoned in 2017)
- Pax Mariae Abbey in Vadstena, Sweden

=== Spanish branch ===
Marina de Escobar founded a Spanish branch in the 1630s, consisting only of nuns, following a slightly modified version of the St Bridget's Rule. It currently consists of four independent monasteries in Spain, four in Mexico and one in Venezuela.

=== Swedish branch ===
The largest branch of the Bridgettines today is the one founded by Saint Elizabeth Hesselblad, a nurse, on 8 September 1911, and consisting of religious sisters dedicated to providing hospitality for those in need of rest. It was fully approved by the Holy See on 7 July 1940, and currently consists of convents in Europe, Asia and North America.

The motherhouse of the order is located on the Piazza Farnese, Rome, Italy, the house where Birgitta had once lived (see Santa Brigida in Rome). On 28 October 2016, Fabia Kattakayam was selected as the order's new Abbess General. She is the first person of Indian descent to serve in this position. As in all the houses of the order, this convent offers accommodation. Protestant services also are held in the crypt, as the sisters have ecumenical outreach as part of their charism. After the Reformation a printshop was set up to print Swedish-language Catholic works.

Controversy arose in 2002 over the treatment of the Indian sisters who form a large percentage of the order. This became public in 2002 when six Indian sisters from different houses of the order in Italy fled and approached the Benedictine Abbot of Subiaco. At the abbot's request, Bishop Silvio Cesare Bonicelli of Parma issued a special decree, permitting the fugitive sisters enter a monastery of Benedictine nuns. As a consequence, the abbot, was subsequently required to resign from office by the Holy See, a highly unusual event.

=== UK branch ===
Iver Heath, in Buckinghamshire, was the first foundation of the new branch of the Bridgettine Order in the UK and has been a house of prayer and provided hospitality since 1931. In 1999 Bridgettine sisters took up residence in a newly built convent at the Maryvale Institute in Birmingham.

== St Bridget's Rule ==
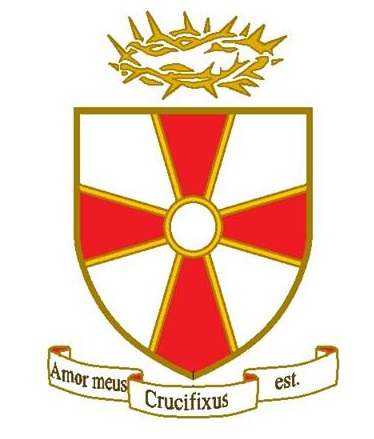
Coat of arms The Order of the Most Holy Savior (Bridgettines)

The original Bridgettine Order was open to both men and women, and was dedicated to devotion to the Passion of Jesus Christ. It was a "double order" each monastery having attached to it a small community of monks to act as chaplains, but under the government of the abbess.

St Bridget's Rule stipulated:

the number of choir nuns shall not exceed sixty, with four lay sisters; the priests shall be thirteen, according to the number of the thirteen apostles, of whom Paul the thirteenth was not the least in toil; then there must be four deacons, who also may be priests if they will, and they are the figure of the four principal Doctors, Ambrose, Augustine, Gregory and Jerome, then eight lay brothers, who with their labors shall minister necessaries to the clerics, therefore counting three-score sisters, thirteen priests, four deacons, and the eight servitors, the number of persons will be the same as the thirteen Apostles and the seventy two-disciples.

The nuns were strictly enclosed, emphasizing scholarship and study, but the monks were also preachers and itinerant missionaries. The individual monasteries were each subject to the local bishop, and, in honor of the Virgin Mary, they were ruled by an abbess.

== Brigittine monks ==
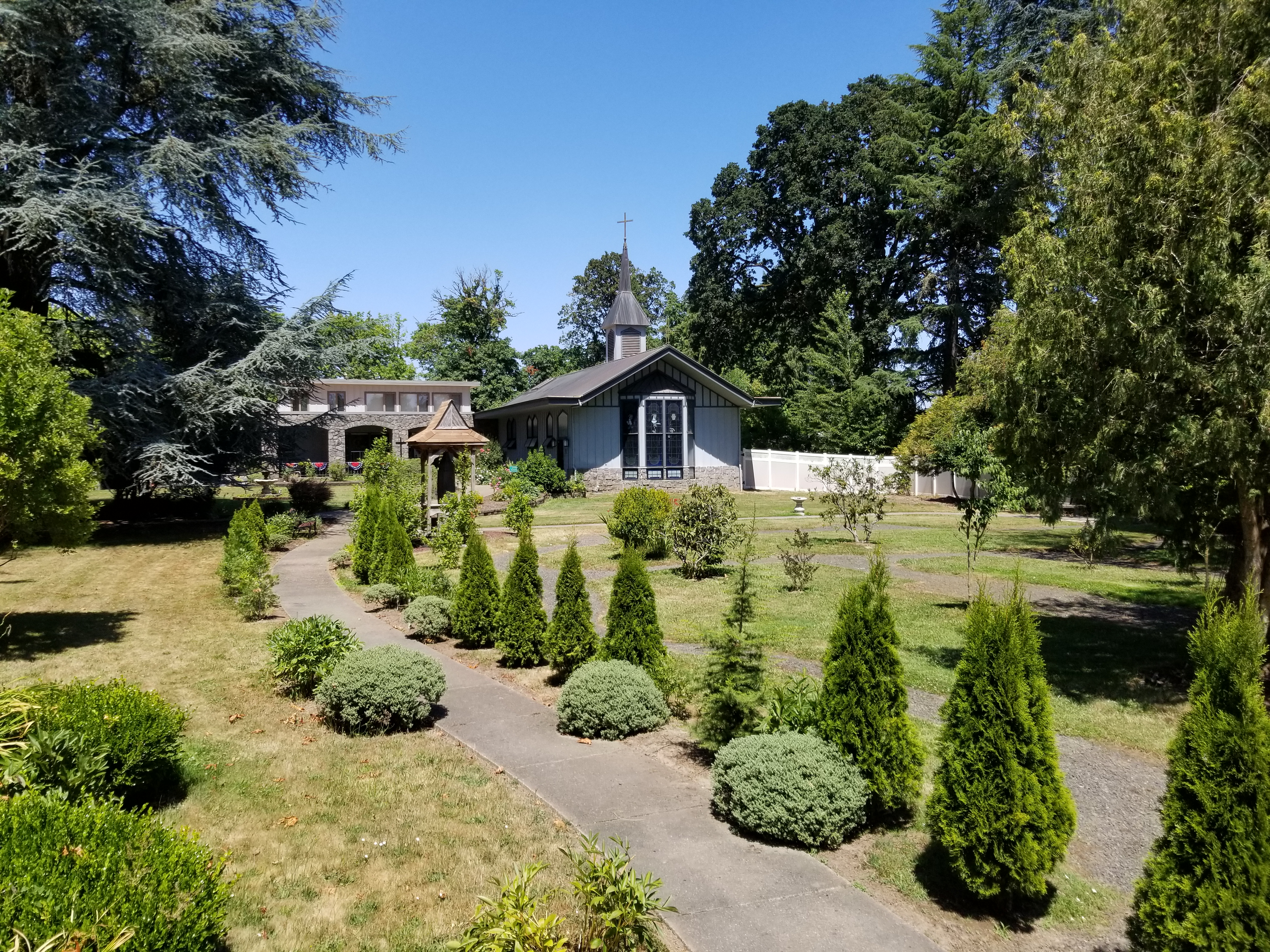
The Brigittine Priory, Our Lady of Consolation in Amity, Oregon, US

An innovative community of Brigittine monks is located in Amity, Oregon, at the Monastery of Our Lady of Consolation. Founded on 16 March 1976, by Brother Benedict Kirby, O.Ss.S., it is the only Brigittine monastery of men in the world and the first since the nineteenth century when they were dispersed, largely due to the European wars. The monks here do not ordinarily receive Holy Orders, following the original pattern of monasticism. The monastery has the canonical status of a priory sui juris (one which is autonomous) and is supported mainly through sales of their chocolate fudges and truffles.

== Saints, Blesseds, and other holy people from the Bridgettine family ==
=== Saints ===
- Bridget of Sweden (c. 1303 – 23 July 1373), founder of the order and Patron Saint of Europe, canonized on 7 October 1391
- Catherine of Vadstena (c. 1332 – 24 March 1381), daughter of Saint Bridget, canonized on 16 August 1482
- Richard Reynolds (c. 1492 – 4 May 1535), called the "Angel of Syon", martyred during the English Reformation, canonized on 25 October 1970
- Maria Elizabeth Hesselblad (4 June 1870 – 24 April 1957), founder of the Bridgettine Sisters and recognised as a Righteous Among the Nations due to her efforts in World War II, canonized on 5 June 2016

=== Blesseds ===
- Marie-Liévine (Marie-Françoise) Lacroix (24 March 1753 - 23 October 1794), Martyr of the French Revolution from Orange and also a professed religious from the Ursulines, beatified on 13 June 1920
- Marie-Augustine (Anne-Marie Joseph) Erraux (20 October 1762 - 23 October 1794), Martyr of the French Revolution from Orange and also a professed religious from the Ursulines, beatified on 13 June 1920

=== Venerables ===
- Florence Kate (Maria Caterina) Flanagan (17 July 1892 - 19 March 1941), professed religious from the Bridgettine Sisters, declared Venerable on 23 March 2023
- Madaleina Catherine Beauchamp Hambrough (Maria Riccarda of the Most Precious Blood) (10 September 1887 - 26 June 1966), professed religious from the Bridgettine Sisters, declared Venerable on 27 January 2025

=== Servants of God ===
- Marina de Escobar Montaña (8 February 1554 - 19 June 1633), founder of the order in Spain
- Ermenegilda Moccia (Maria Maddalena of Jesus Crucified) (1 August 1898 - 22 April 1922), professed religious from the Bridgettine Sisters, declared as a Servant of God on 16 December 2009

== See also ==
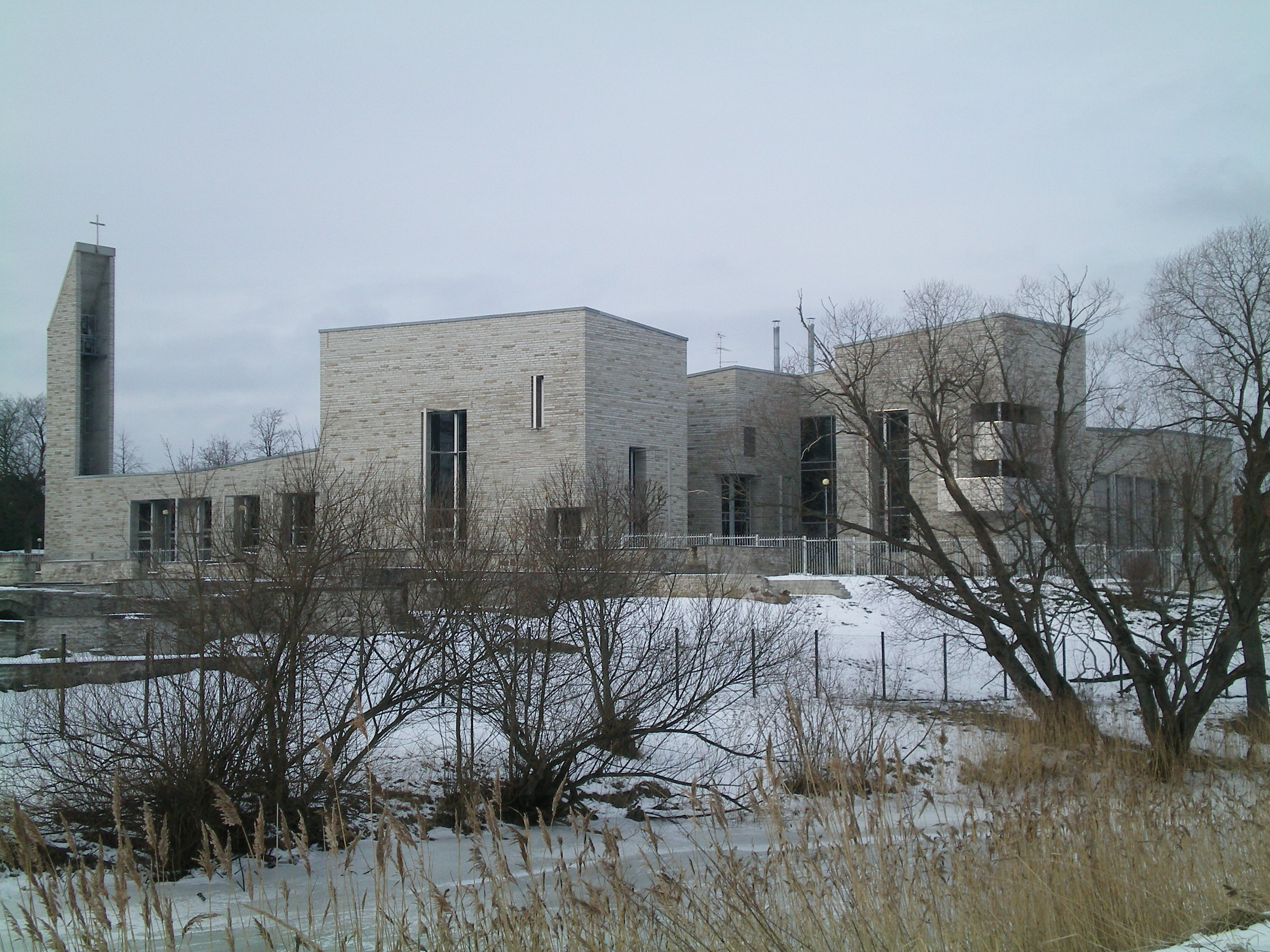
New St. Bridget convent in Pirita, Tallinn, Estonia

- Katerina Lemmel
- Mother Tekla Famiglietti
- Societas Sanctae Birgittae
- Pirita convent
