= Arizona Center for Medieval and Renaissance Studies =

American statewide tri-university research unit

Coordinates: 33°25′16″N 111°55′54″W

The Arizona Center for Medieval and Renaissance Studies (ACMRS) was established in 1981, by the Arizona Board of Regents as a state-wide, tri-university research unit that bridges the intellectual communities at Arizona State University, Northern Arizona University, and the University of Arizona. Located centrally on the campus of Arizona State University, ACMRS is charged with coordinating and stimulating interdisciplinary research about medieval and early modern literature and culture.

== History of ACMRS ==
The Arizona Center for Medieval and Renaissance Studies (ACMRS) was established as a statewide research unit in 1981. It is housed centrally on the ASU campus and is charged with stimulating the multi- and interdisciplinary exploration of medieval and Renaissance culture. Its activities cover a period from roughly AD 400, the fall of the Roman Empire, to AD 1700. ACMRS coordinates programs at ASU, NAU, and UA (see Appendix 1 for the current list of affiliates). The tri-university structure of ACMRS was envisioned as an instrument for enhancing cooperation and encouraging the sharing of resources among the three state universities. From 1982 to 1993, ACMRS was directed by Jean R. Brink from the Department of English at ASU. From 1994 to the present, it has been directed by Robert E. Bjork, also from the Department of English at ASU.

1982-87: In establishing ACMRS, ASU employed Professor Fredi Chiappelli, then Director of the UCLA Center for Medieval and Renaissance Studies, as a consultant. Because he directed an internationally recognized center and had previously served as a visiting professor at the University of Arizona and as a visiting lecturer at Northern Arizona University and was therefore familiar with the Arizona universities, his participation in the founding of the Center was viewed as essential.

The founding document approved by the Arizona Board of Regents (ABOR) in 1981 indicated that ACMRS was to be funded by a decision package submitted to ABOR by the three universities. Prior to the submission of a decision package, funding was to be provided on an ad hoc basis by ASU. The founding document also included the following provisions: ACMRS was to be located at ASU; a Director with an indefinite term was to be appointed; a Steering Committee composed of three scholars from each university was to be appointed and would serve on a rotating basis; subsequent members of the Steering Committee were to be nominated by the standing Steering Committee and appointed by the Vice President for Academic Affairs at ASU; each university was to contribute one visiting professor per year who was to visit the other two campuses; four Research Assistants (RAs) were to be funded at each university per year to assist faculty members in their research.

Immediately after ACMRS's approval by ABOR, economic recession prevented the three universities from submitting a joint decision package. Funding difficulties after one year caused the RA program to be discontinued as a statewide effort, and the efficiency of a statewide structure was thereafter understandably undercut by lack of a central funding source.

The Steering Committee, which found it difficult to meet three times per year as originally agreed because of funding problems, decided to restructure itself in two ways: 1) the actual Steering Committee was reconstituted to consist of three past presidents of the Steering Committee, one from each university; and 2) an Advisory Board was created to include six members per campus, a total of eighteen scholars. This was the status of ACMRS at the time of its first Sunset Review in 1987.

1987-93: During the next stage in ACMRS history, continued lack of funding made it more and more difficult to maintain a statewide network. Communication by telephone and electronic mail continued to flourish, and some cooperation among faculty continued independently of a formal structure as well as through ACMRS. Local campus operations at the three universities, however, began to perform many of the functions originally envisioned for a statewide Center. Local medieval and Renaissance committees previously established at both NAU and UA played and continue to play important roles in promoting medieval and Renaissance studies at their respective institutions.

At ASU, ACMRS was given regular personnel and operations budgets, covering staff, printing, mailing, and other administrative costs, and was placed in the College of Liberal Arts and Sciences (CLAS). CLAS Deans continued to support and fund ACMRS as a clearinghouse for a statewide calendar of events and as a unit coordinating visiting scholars on a statewide basis. The Center Director was put on a fiscal contract, obtained an Assistant Director, a Program Coordinator, two RAs, and a post-doctoral fellow, as well as one visiting distinguished professor to be appointed annually. All ASU affiliate faculty nominate the visiting professor, and these nominations were screened and discussed by local faculty in consultation with department chairs. ASU continued to seek informal advice from scholars at UA and NAU on appointments and visitors. Since both UA and NAU had created local committees, it became clear that this kind of mechanism for establishing priorities was likewise required at ASU. An Advisory Council was established with six faculty from ASU and one each from UA and NAU. A distinguished scholar from outside Arizona--a former visiting professor--was also invited to join the Advisory Council.

Because of a state-wide budgetary crisis and a negative CLAS Strategic Planning Committee report about ACMRS, the Center was asked in the spring of 1993 to cut $53,539 (22%) from its 1993-94 budget and $77,780 (56%) from its 1994-95 budget of $138,893. In response to that request, the Director gave up her summer salary, eliminated the post-doctoral fellowship, further reduced operating expenses, and cut funds for the Visiting Distinguished Professor line in half. In June, 1994, Professor Brink stepped down as Director of ACMRS and returned to full-time teaching in the English Department.

1994-99: In July 1994, Robert E. Bjork was appointed Director of ACMRS. The staff of the Center by that time had been reduced to a full-time Assistant Director, a full-time Program Coordinator, and one half-time RA. Since his appointment, in addition to continuing programs already established such as an ad hoc lecture series, a graduate student travel award to the Medieval Congress at Western Michigan University in Kalamazoo, and a book award for promising undergraduates intending to do post-graduate work in medieval or Renaissance studies, Bjork instituted over twenty programs or initiatives that changed the structure of ACMRS, lent it more national and international prominence, and reinvigorated cooperation among Arizona's three universities. One such early innovation was immediately to reverse a decision made before his appointment that ACMRS would not offer an annual conference, just occasional ones. Faculty and students from all three of Arizona’s universities participate in this conference, delivering papers and chairing sessions, and faculty members from all three universities edit the volumes of essays (published by Brepols in Belgium) that are developed on the conference themes. Another was to create bylaws (Appendix 2) for the unit, which, among other things, changed the term of appointment for the Director from unlimited to up to five years with extensions possible at the discretion of the Dean and University President. The ACMRS Advisory Council was likewise changed and now consists of at least four but no more than six representatives from ASU and at least one, but no more than three, representatives each from NAU and UA. The position for an Advisory Council member from outside Arizona was eliminated. In 1994, three members each from UA and NAU agreed to serve on the board. A new Council, appointed in the fall of 1998, consisted of six members from ASU and three each once more from NAU and UA.

As a result of all the programmatic changes instituted since July 1994, the ACMRS staff grew. The .50 FTE RA position was converted to a full-time Research Coordinator position; four .50 FTE RAs were added to the ACMRS staff during the academic year with an additional eight to ten RAs during the summers; and a full-time Managing Editor and full-time Production Manager were hired to run ACMRS's new, major publishing program, "Medieval and Renaissance Texts and Studies" (MRTS), acquired from SUNY Binghamton in 1996. In July 1998, the Managing Editor position was reduced to a .50 FTE Associate Editor position with the remaining funds being used to fund a .25 FTE student employee and to increase the salary of the Production Manager. At the time of the 1999 Sunset Review, ACMRS had a well-established annual interdisciplinary, international conference as well as well-established publishing programs, which gave it a much stronger local, national, and international presence than it had had in the past.

1999-2002: ACMRS’s local, regional, national, and international standing continued to rise during this period; new programs and initiatives were put into place; and external and internal funding continued to grow. Grant writing both externally and internally, for example, increased to an average of 16 proposals per year; and manuscript submissions to the MRTS series continued to flow in. ACMRS has never had to solicit a manuscript.

One new program began in the spring of 1999, when Bjork inaugurated the lecture series “Distinguished Lectures in Medieval and Renaissance Studies”; he entered into discussions the same year with the Research Center for Romance Studies (RCRS) at UC Berkeley that eventually led to an agreement for ACMRS to publish two of RCRS’s book series within MRTS; in 2000, he acquired for publication within MRTS the prestigious, projected 50-volume “Anglo-Saxon Manuscripts in Microfiche Facsimile” series funded by NEH, began the “MRTS Reprints” series (which reprints important scholarly works now out-of-print), and established “Key Works in Germanic Scholarship” (which will focus on major German scholarship on historical linguistics [in English translation]) from the late 19th and early 20th centuries. As of 2007, this sub-series has produced no titles.

Also during this period, Bjork continued old and entered into new joint publication ventures in the U.S. and abroad, and in 2002, he established a new book series apart from MRTS entitled “ACMRS Occasional Publications,” which includes books that relate directly or indirectly to the study and teaching of the Middle Ages and Renaissance but are not “mainline” scholarly works. And during this whole period, he made sure that cooperation among units on campus at ASU and among the three Arizona university campuses increased via various ACMRS programs but especially on the state-level through the annual conference, the Cambridge summer program (with faculty and students from all three universities participating), publications (with faculty from all three universities sitting on various editorial boards), and lectures (some supported by all three universities). Outreach programs likewise remained strong and internationally included joint meetings of the ACMRS conference with that of the Medieval Academy of America in 2001 that attracted 367 attendees from 12 countries and with that of the Renaissance Society of America in spring 2002 that attracted approximately 730 attendees world-wide.

Finally, since the acquisition of MRTS in 1996, ACMRS saved CLAS an average of $7,224 per year in its salary commitment to ACMRS for the series and, because of that commitment, generated an average of $20,000 per year in grant support and $15,500 in additional salaries. The Managing Editor position was again increased to full-time during this period (with 25% of the salary being funded by ACMRS) as ACMRS publications programs expanded.

2002-7: During the period of the current fine-year review, Bjork was on research leave for two years (2003-4 at the Institute for Advanced Study, Princeton, and 2006-7 on an NEH Fellowship), but ACMRS continued to rise in prominence globally. In 2002/3, Bjork arranged for ACMRS to distribute the publications of the Viking Society for Northern Research (University of London), the Istituto storico italiano per il Medio Evo (Rome), and Roma nel Rinascimento (Rome); he successfully negotiated with AMS Press in New York the publication of the annual journal Studies in Medieval and Renaissance History under the auspices of ACMRS; and he brought the biannual meeting of the International Society of Anglo-Saxonists, for which he was President, to ACMRS. Also in 2003, he re-conceptualized the ACMRS Distinguished Visiting Professor line to make it fulfill both its original function and a new one, that of the ACMRS Faculty Fellows Program, which would grant one ASU faculty member a semester’s worth of research leave each year.

In 2003/4, he negotiated agreements with the Medieval Studies Program at Pennsylvania State University and with the International Society of Anglo-Saxonists to publish series of their books and with Brepols to have another book series (“Late Medieval and Early Modern Studies”) produced under ACMRS’s auspices and the auspices of the University of Melbourne. These agreements are designed to embed ACMRS in the world community of medieval and Renaissance scholars and to foster international cooperation. And to gauge how successful ACMRS was becoming in funding its own programs, Bjork conducted an informal survey of all medieval and Renaissance studies centers in North America, inquiring about what percentage of their annual budgets they managed to cover from their own funds and what percentage was covered by their universities. He discovered that as of March, 2003, ACMRS ranks first in this category, its closest competitor being the Medieval Institute at Western Michigan University, which hosts the largest medieval conference in the world every year (some 3,000 attendees) and covers approximately 50% of its own budget. Centers at UCLA and Notre Dame cover about 30% of their budgets and those at Toronto and Ohio State 5% and 1% respectively. ACMRS, on the other hand, generated funds to cover 56.2% of its total budget in 2003/4, 56.3% in 2004/5, 55.8% in 2005/6, and 58.2% in 2006/7.

To foster even better relationships with UA and NAU, in 2005/6, ACMRS held three fall receptions, the usual one in Bjork’s home in Scottsdale and one each in Tucson and Flagstaff. All three have become annual events as has a new reception devoted to graduate students at ASU each fall and launched in the same year. Also in 2005/6 in order to increase its own fund-raising efforts and support those of others on campus, ACMRS began offering its annual Distinguished Lecture in Medieval Studies during Homecoming week in collaboration with other departments. In 2005, ACMRS paired with history, in 2006, with Religious Studies, and in 2007, with the School of International Letters and Culture and the Melikian Center for Russian, Eurasian, and East European Studies.

The final year, 2006/7, of this reporting period for the five-year review likewise saw a number of developments at ACMRS. The annual conference was co-hosted by the Rocky Mountain Medieval and Renaissance Association, first of all, and ACMRS looks forward to a closer working relationship with that regional association in the future. Bjork also negotiated an agreement with the University of Maryland, College Park, to co-publish the journal Early Modern Women beginning in 2007; ACMRS began a new subseries within MRTS called FRETS (“French of England Texts and Studies”) with Fordham University and York University (UK) and has four titles in the works for it; and ACMRS became the joint sponsor with the Society for Medieval Feminist Scholarship of MEDFEM-L (medieval feminist listserv). Last, Bjork served on the inaugural standing committee of CARMEN (“Co-operative for the Advancement of Research through a Medieval European Network”), a European organization the main purpose of which is to generate ideas and institutional teams for major funding proposals to agencies in Europe such as the European Science Foundation. At the second meeting of CARMEN, held this time in Prato, Italy, Bjork also began negotiations for collaborative efforts between ACMRS and the developing Prato Centre for Medieval and Renaissance Studies of Monash University in Australia.

=== Directors ===
From 1982 until 1994, ACMRS was directed by Jean R. Brink from the Department of English at ASU. Robert E. Bjork, also from the Department of English at ASU, directed the center from 1994 to 2018.

Starting in 2018, ACMRS is directed by Ayanna Thompson, Professor in the Department of English at Arizona State University.

== Public Programs ==
=== Distinguished Lectures ===
In the spring of 1999, ACMRS established its Distinguished Lecture Series. Initially, the Center brought one eminent scholar to ASU for a few days to present a public lecture, interact with upper-division and/or graduate classes, and meet informally with students and faculty.

The Distinguished Lecture series was reimagined in 2018 to support the mission of developing public-facing humanities programs that make premodern studies relevant to a contemporary, non-academic audience. In January 2018, ACMRS hosted Peter Sellars for an evening dialogue entitled "Engaging the Past to Create the Avant Garde."

In January of 2019, ACMRS hosted Marlon James as the annual distinguished lecturer, for an event entitled "Reclaiming the Fantasy Novel."

In October of 2020, ACMRS hosted Nnedi Okorafor as the Distinguished Lecturer for the 2020-21 academic year.

=== RaceB4Race ===
RaceB4Race is a cross-institutional scholarly community for scholars and students of premodern critical race studies. The inaugural RaceB4Race conference emerged as a collaboration between the Medievalists of Color (MOC) and the ShakeRace (Shakespeare and Race) community, groups that were both seeking to push their fields in new archival, theoretical, methodological, pedagogical and practical directions.

The catalyst for the event was the rejection of proposals for sessions on race and antiracism by Medievalists of Color in favor of sessions proposed by their white colleagues by the International Congress of Medieval Studies (ICMS) in Kalamazoo, MI. RaceB4Race offered an “alternate home” for the rejected MOC sessions and an opportunity for a collaboration between the MOC and ShakeRace communities. In the end, the inaugural RaceB4Race event demonstrated to the world how our understandings of periodization, historicity and even academic disciplines can become more expansive once race is acknowledged as a viable lens of investigation.

== Awards and Fellowships ==
=== ACMRS-Huntington Library Fellowship ===
The Arizona Center for Medieval and Renaissance Studies, in collaboration with The Huntington Library, offers annually the ACMRS Huntington Library Fellowship to aid in dissertation, post-doctoral or faculty research using the collections of The Huntington.

A requirement for holding the fellowship is that the time of tenure be spent in residence at The Huntington: the period of residence may vary, but must be a minimum of one month. The Huntington Library welcomes the inaugural ACMRS fellow with a $3,500 award for a one-month residency.

=== Graduate Travel Award ===
ACMRS offers a travel award to a graduate student to present a paper at the International Medieval Congress, held every May at the Western Michigan University, Kalamazoo.

=== Ira Aldridge Internships ===
The Arizona Center for Medieval and Renaissance Studies offers paid internships for ASU undergraduates. Interns earn hands-on experience in publishing, working directly with ACMRS staff and scholars on projects that will have a direct influence on the Center. Interns are paid $2,800 and can receive 3 credit hours.

=== Short Term Residencies ===
The annual ACMRS Short-Term Residency will enable scholars who have earned a Ph.D. in a pre-modern field to pursue their research for a period of four to six weeks. The residency is designed to allow scholars to focus on finishing projects for publication. The Director of ACMRS and senior members of ACMRS’ in-house press can provide publishing advice and mentoring. Each resident will present their work in a public lecture, showcasing their scholarship. Opportunities for graduate student mentorship are also available.

== Publications ==
=== Medieval and Renaissance Texts and Studies (MRTS) and Renaissance English Text Society (RETS) ===
Medieval and Renaissance Texts and Studies (MRTS) is a series of translations, studies, reference works, and editions including those of the Renaissance English Text Society (RETS). MRTS Online is a joint project between Iter and ACMRS to make select MRTS titles available in electronic format.

=== Anglo-Saxon Manuscripts in Microfiche Facsimile (ASMMF) ===
Anglo-Saxon Manuscripts in Microfiche Facsimile (ASMMF) is a project which makes available in microfiche nearly five hundred manuscripts containing Old English.

=== Studies in Medieval and Renaissance History (until 2025) ===
Studies in Medieval and Renaissance History is a journal that provides an outlet for the presentation of scholarship that often falls outside the limitations of other publications. It publishes interpretive and historiographical essays that explore the ramifications of current scholarship or that treat issues and themes of interest to any historian of the pre-modern period.. Since 2025, the journal has been published by University of Lincoln and renamed Studies in Medieval and Renaissance Sources.

=== Early Modern Women ===
Early Modern Women: An Interdisciplinary Journal is a joint publication of ACMRS and the University of Maryland. This journal publishes essays on women and gender during the years 1500-1700 from all geographical areas and across all relevant fields: European, African, Islamic, Asian, and colonial studies, as well as studies of literature, art, music, history, history of science, religion, and anthropology.

== Fundraising and Endowment ==
=== The Saint John's Bible ===
In October 2010, ACMRS unveiled the Heritage Edition of the St. John's Bible at its annual Distinguished Lecture in Medieval Studies. Dr. Rodney M. Thompson, Honorary Research Fellow at the School of History and Classics of the University of Tasmania, presented a lecture on the "Great Illuminated Bibles of 12th-Century England: A Study in Splendor" following the dedication of the specially-printed facsimile Bible. The seven-volume Heritage Edition was donated by Phoenix resident, George Berkner, a 1956 Saint John's University graduate. It resides at the Universities' Special Collections in Hayden Library at ASU and in the offices of ACMRS.

=== The Seated King ===
In the Spring of 2004, ACMRS received a unique medieval statue as a donation from the Metropolitan Museum of Art docent, Jeri Garbaccio and her husband Charles. The gift was accepted in honor of Florence E. Nelson of Scottsdale, Arizona, and in memory of Renee Kra, former Managing Editor of Radiocarbon at the University of Arizona. The medieval figure is a three-foot wood polychromy seated king of Spanish origin, dating back to the second half of the thirteenth century. The statue is on display at the ACMRS main office in Tempe, Arizona.
