= Tekla Famiglietti =

Italian nun (1936–2020)

The Reverend Mother Tekla Famiglietti OSsS
- Born: 23 December 1936; Sturno, Italy
- Died: 3 March 2020 (aged 83); Rome, Italy
- Other names: Maria Tekla Famiglietti
- Occupation: Religious sister
- Religion: Christianity (Roman Catholic)
- Church: Latin Church
- Offices held: Abbess General of the Order of the Most Holy Savior (1977–2016)

Maria Tekla Famiglietti OSsS (1936–2020) was an Italian Catholic religious sister who served as the abbess general of the Order of the Most Holy Savior, commonly called the Bridgettine Sisters, beginning in 1981. On 28 October 2016, Famiglietti retired and was replaced by Fabia Kattakayam.

== Life ==
Born 23 December 1936, Famiglietti grew up in a village near Naples, Italy. She entered the House of St. Bridget in Rome at 13. She was the order's Superior General from 1981 to 2016 and thus built up the order during more than three decades.

Famiglietti encouraged wealthy and powerful benefactors of the order, such as Fidel Castro, Ronald Reagan, casino operator José María Guardia, and Francisco Franco. She oversaw a number of hotels, guesthouses and restaurants in several countries, including Israel, India, Cuba, the United States, and Italy.

Famiglietti was a traditionalist Catholic who expressed orthodox beliefs. In 2005 Pope John Paul II decided to establish a Peace Centre in Jerusalem and asked her to implement it. She had a close relationship with the Pope and was present at his death bed.

Famiglietti died on 3 March 2020.

== Controversy ==
Controversy has arisen over the treatment of the Indian women who form a large percentage of the order. Most houses of the order support themselves by providing bed and breakfast hospitality to guests at standard industry rates. This became public in 2002 when six Indian sisters from different houses of the order in Italy fled to a Benedictine monastery, where they were given refuge by the abbot, who was subsequently deposed from office by the Holy See for this, a highly unusual act.
