= City walls of Nuremberg =

Medieval fortifications around the old city of Nuremberg, Germany

Walls of Nürnberg
- Stadtmauer Nürnberg
- Part of Nürnberg (Nuremberg)
- Nuremberg, Germany
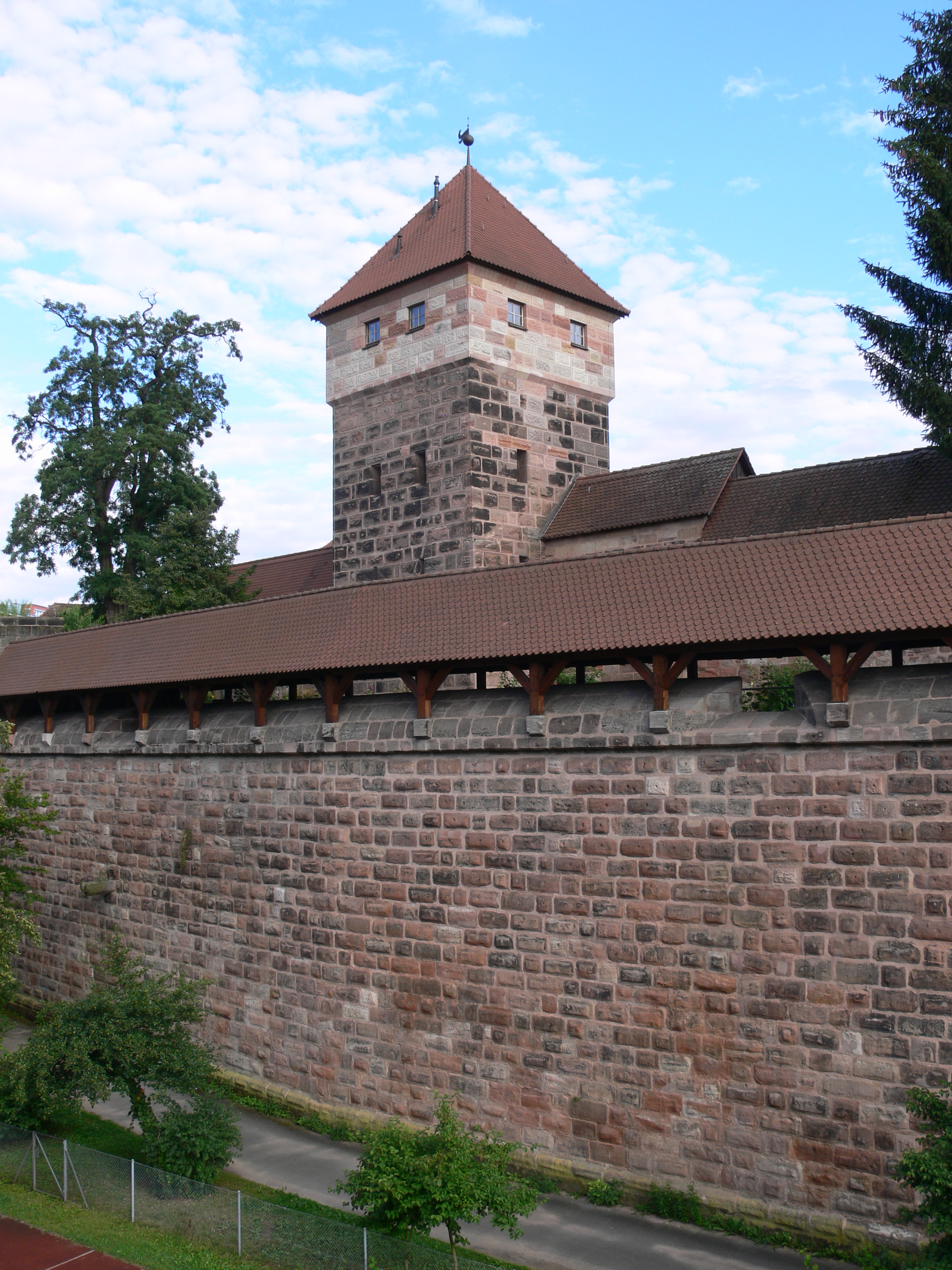

Site information
- Type: City walls
- Owner: Nuremberg
- Condition: Intact

Location
- Coordinates: 49°27′27.72″N 11°5′17.88″E

Site history
- Built: 11th century – 16th century
- In use: 11th century – 1940s
- Battles/wars: Battle of Nuremberg (1945)

The city walls are the medieval defensive mechanism surrounding the old city of Nuremberg, Germany. Construction started in the 12th century and ended officially in the 16th century. They measured 5 kilometers (with about 4 kilometers still standing) around the old town. The Nuremberg Castle together with the city wall is meant to be one of Europe's most considerable medieval defensive systems.

The city wall is one of the most important art and architectural monuments in the city of Nuremberg. In the north, the extensive castle complex is fully integrated into the fortification.

== The first walls ==
The first fortifications are believed to date back to the 11th century.

In the 13th century, the districts on both sides of the Pegnitz, the Sebalder and the Lorenzer Siedlung, were fortified separately. On the Sebald side, next to the castle and the Tiergärtner Tor in the north, especially the Laufer Schlagturm in the east has been preserved. On the Lorenz side there is still the White Tower in the west of the old town. Remnants of the old city moat have been preserved in various locations.

It was not until 1320–1325 that the two parts were brought together across the river by walls: the executioner's tower and the water tower still stand to the west, and the debtor's tower to the east.

== The present city wall ==
The present city wall was completed in 1400 as a five kilometers long, crooked parallelogram. Four gate towers were built at its four corner points.

The city wall was divided into the actual city wall (also called the high wall), the ground-level and 15-meter-wide kennel in front of it, the kennel wall rising from the moat and the dry moat. A total of about 130 moat and wall towers can be identified on old depictions from the time. A moat was built from around 1430 following the Hussite Wars and was an average of 12 meters deep and up to 20 meters wide, but never filled with water. In 1452 the construction of the moat was completed.

Seven gates provided access to the city: it consisted of the towers (Laufer Tor, Frauentor, Spittlertor and Neutor) and two pedestrian passages (Hallertürlein on the north bank of the Pegnitz in the west and Wöhrder Türlein in the east). There was also the Vestnertor leading to the castle. Where the Pegnitz leaves the city, it was imposingly spanned by the Fronveste from 1489/94; in the east the Tratzenzwinger secured the river entry.

== Extensions ==
From 1500, the walls were redesigned for updated defensive procedures. Old towers were rebuilt or demolished and new towers and bastions were built. The redesign began with the entry and exit of the Pegnitz and ended at the wall north of the Frauentor.

In 1527 the Küblerzwinger (also called Dürerbastei) was built in the northeast and the Tucherzwinger, each as a round bastion, in the southwest.

1538–45 the castle bastions (Vestnertor-, Great and Lower Bastion) were built in the north and west of the castle.

In 1556–64 the four gate towers were encased and given their present-day impressive appearance: the Laufertorturm (Laufer Tor in the northeast), the Frauentorturm (Frauentor in the southeast), the Spittlertorturm (Spittlertor in the southwest) and the Neutorturm (Neutor in the northwest). In 1611–14, the Zwingermauer south of the Laufer Tor was renewed and the Wöhrdertor bastion was erected, which was demolished in 1871.

After that, the city wall was not adapted very much to the developing state of defence technology. Instead, from as early as the Thirty Years' War, Nuremberg had protections in the form of entrenchments far from the city limits.

== In modern times ==
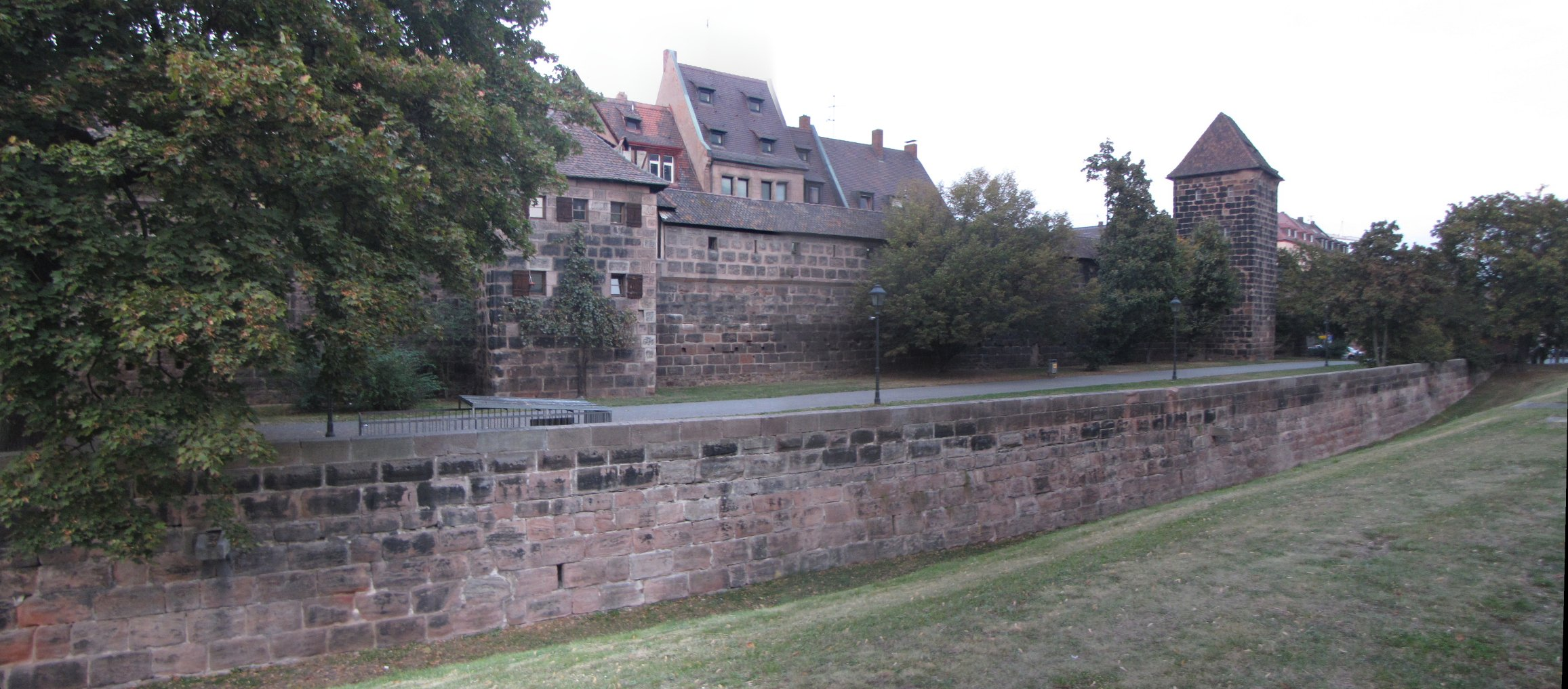
Rotes K

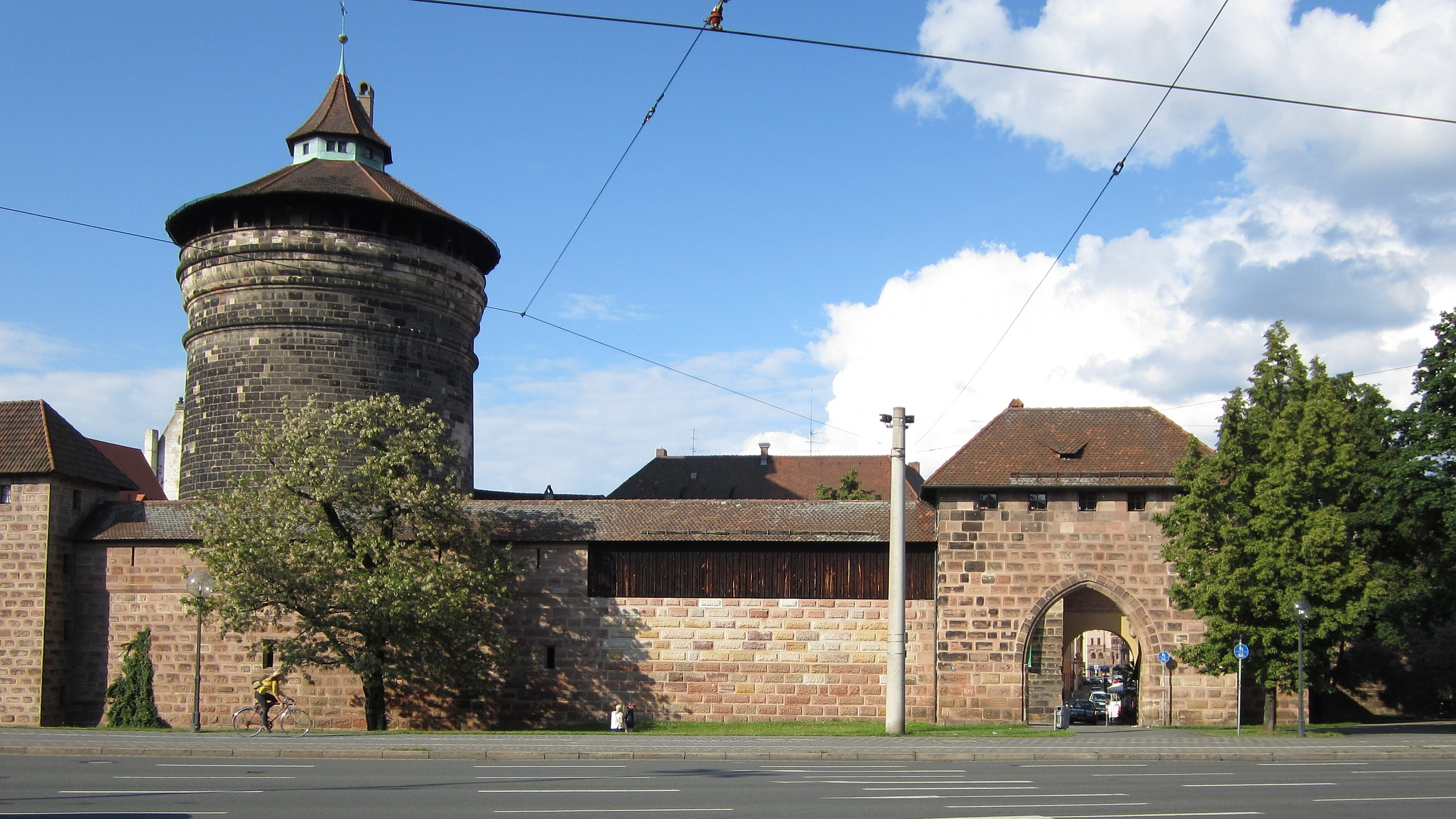
Spittlertor, Rotes Q

A long period of economic stagnation till the industrial revolution in the 19th century had a museum like preservative effect on the building stock of Nuremberg.

When Bavaria took over in 1806, the city retained its fortress status. The five main gates were guarded and three other gates were locked at night. The traffic to the suburbs grew steadily, but by 1866 only seven further city gates were approved for construction in a neo-Gothic style.

An application made by the city to de-fortify in 1863 was rejected, as Nuremberg's fortresses were viewed as a stabilising factor in the face of social unrest. On 12 July 1866 the demolition was approved, also in anticipation of a Prussian occupation. In the following years there were repeated arguments about the preservation or demolition of the city wall, for the time being the king reserved the final decision on any structural change. In 1869 the first wall was demolished and further demolitions followed.

Due to the growing traffic, the seven newly built gates were torn down from 1877 to 1891. Further breakthroughs in the wall were created: the Sterntor in 1869, the Wöhrder Tor in 1871, the Hallertor in 1881 and the Fürth Gate in 1894 in the form of a bridge.

During the Second World War, the city fortifications were severely damaged by air raids. On 3 October 1944, for example, the Fronveste on the Pegnitz was badly hit in a daytime attack. After the war, the destruction was partially repaired.

In the 1960s, parts of the Frauentorgraben in the south were filled in. During the construction of the U2 underground line, this section of the trench was exposed again in 1987. Plans for an extensive redesign of the area of the Königstor / Marientor wall in 1967/68 was not implemented.

== Current condition ==
Even though it has been heavily restored or rebuilt in parts, the city wall has been almost completely preserved and surrounds the old town. The largest gap is over 310 meters at the Laufer gate tower (49°27′27.55″N 11°05′17.75″E). The preservation of the wall is an ongoing process; in 2005, for example, the Maxtor wall in the "Küblerzwinger" area was restored.

Behind, on and in front of the wall and in the partially preserved ditch there are mostly publicly accessible walking paths. The moat itself is largely designed like a park. The mighty bastions to the west and north of the castle are set up as castle gardens and are generally accessible in the warm season.

At the end of the Second World War there were still 88 towers, today there are 71, Many of these are used by organisations, associations and private individuals, for example as youth centers, advice centers, museums, artists' meeting places and rooms for students, and in this way some of them are open to the public.

1997–2003, the Museum Tower of the Senses was planned and implemented in the Mohrenturm (Green B) at the west gate.

In contrast to Rothenburg ob der Tauber, for example, a medieval wall with walkable battlements does not shape the picture. Rather, four thick towers form corner pillars, between which the walls extend.

== Historical illustrations ==
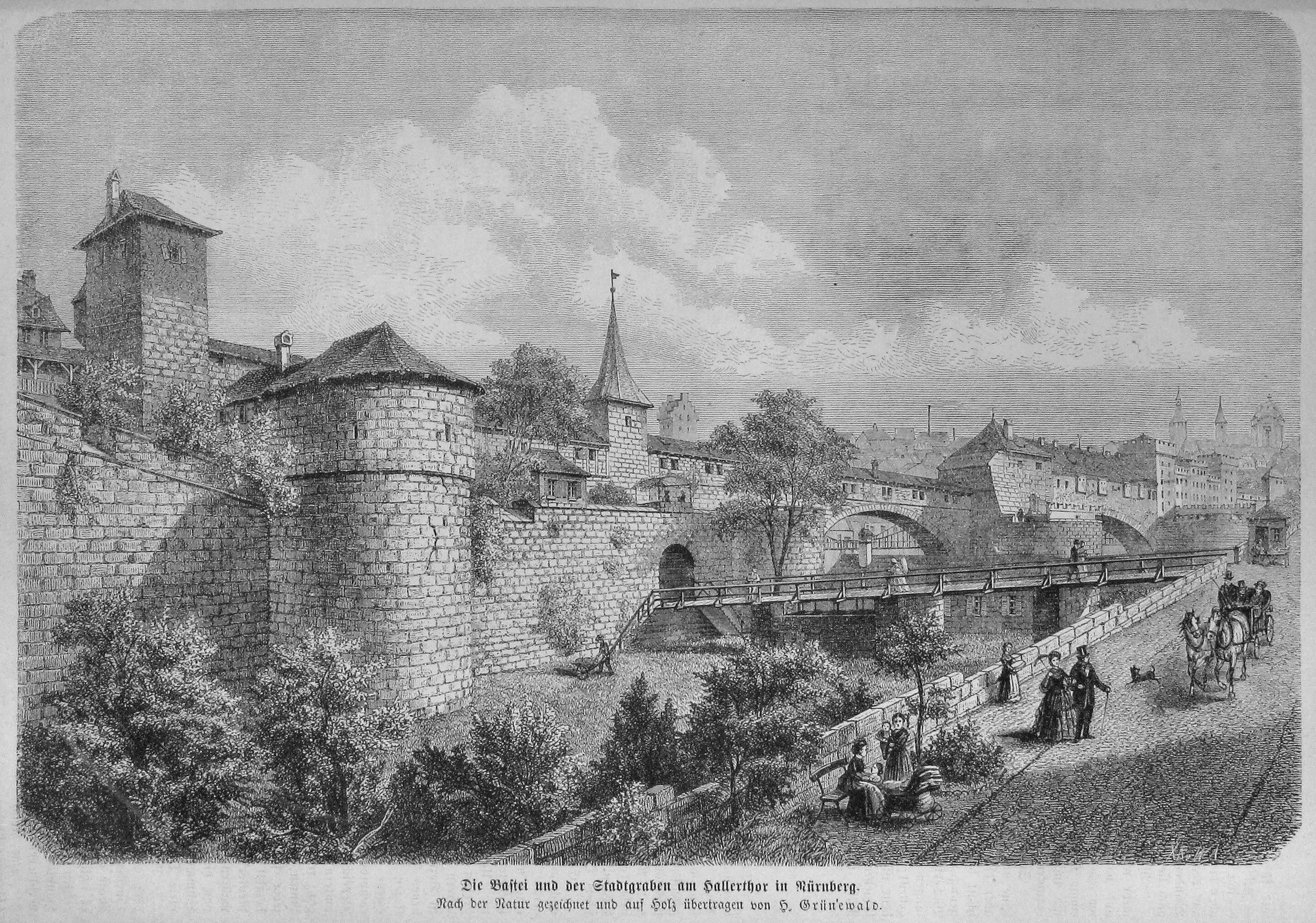
Hallertor, 1873

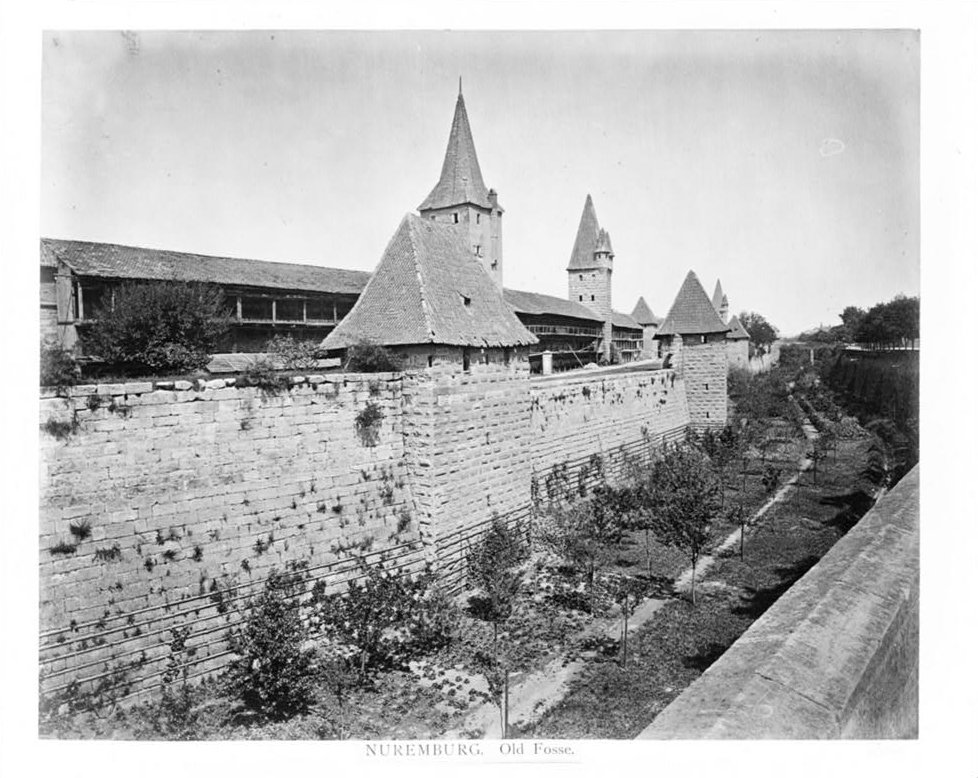
City wall, late 19th century

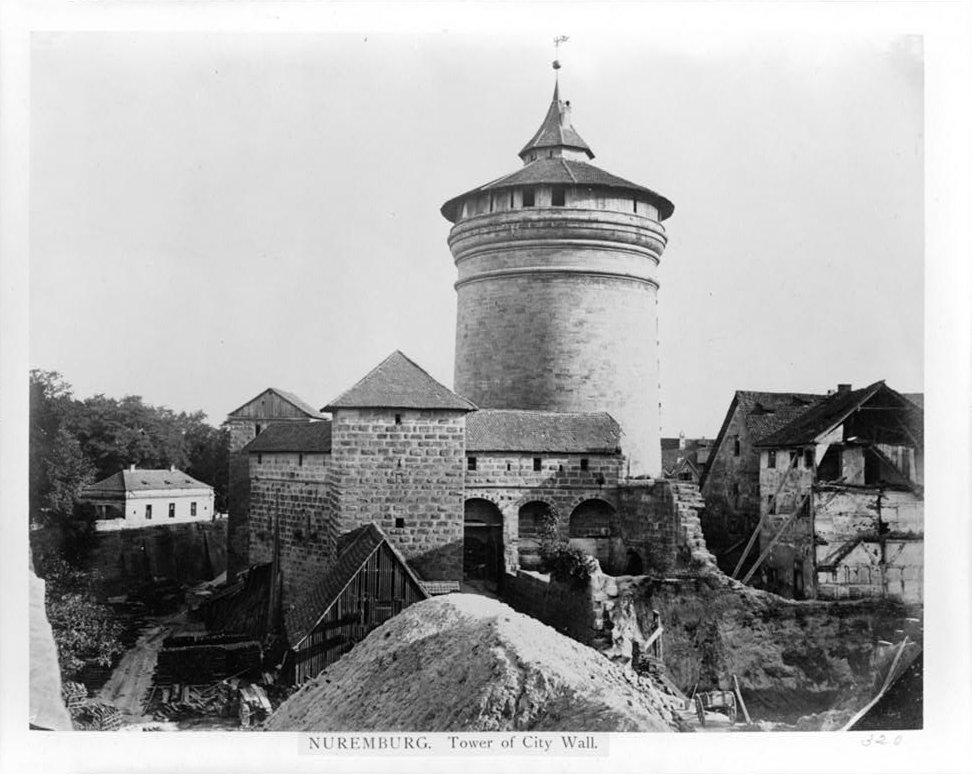
Laufertorturm, in 1890

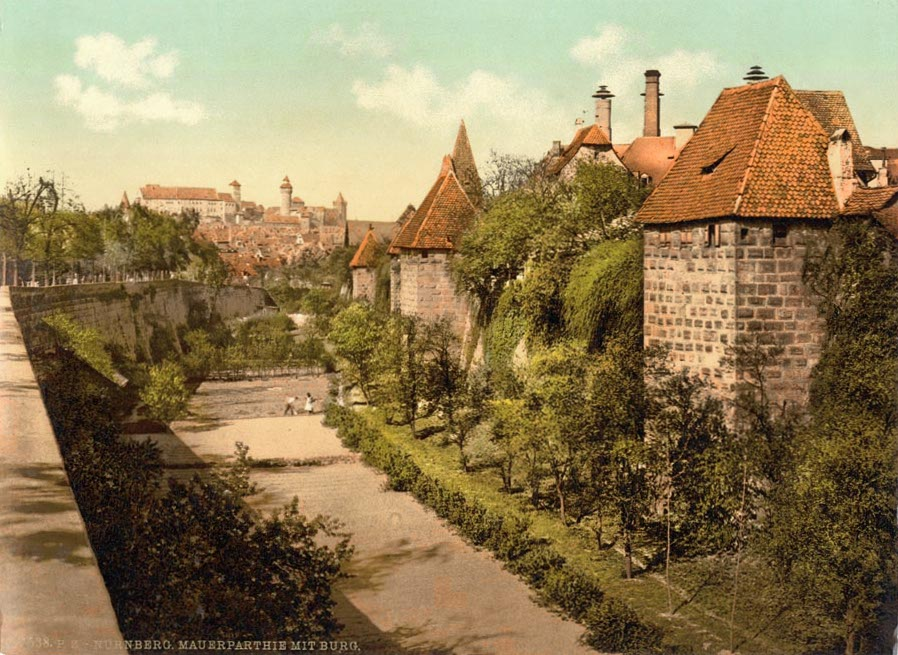
Stadtmauer, in 1890

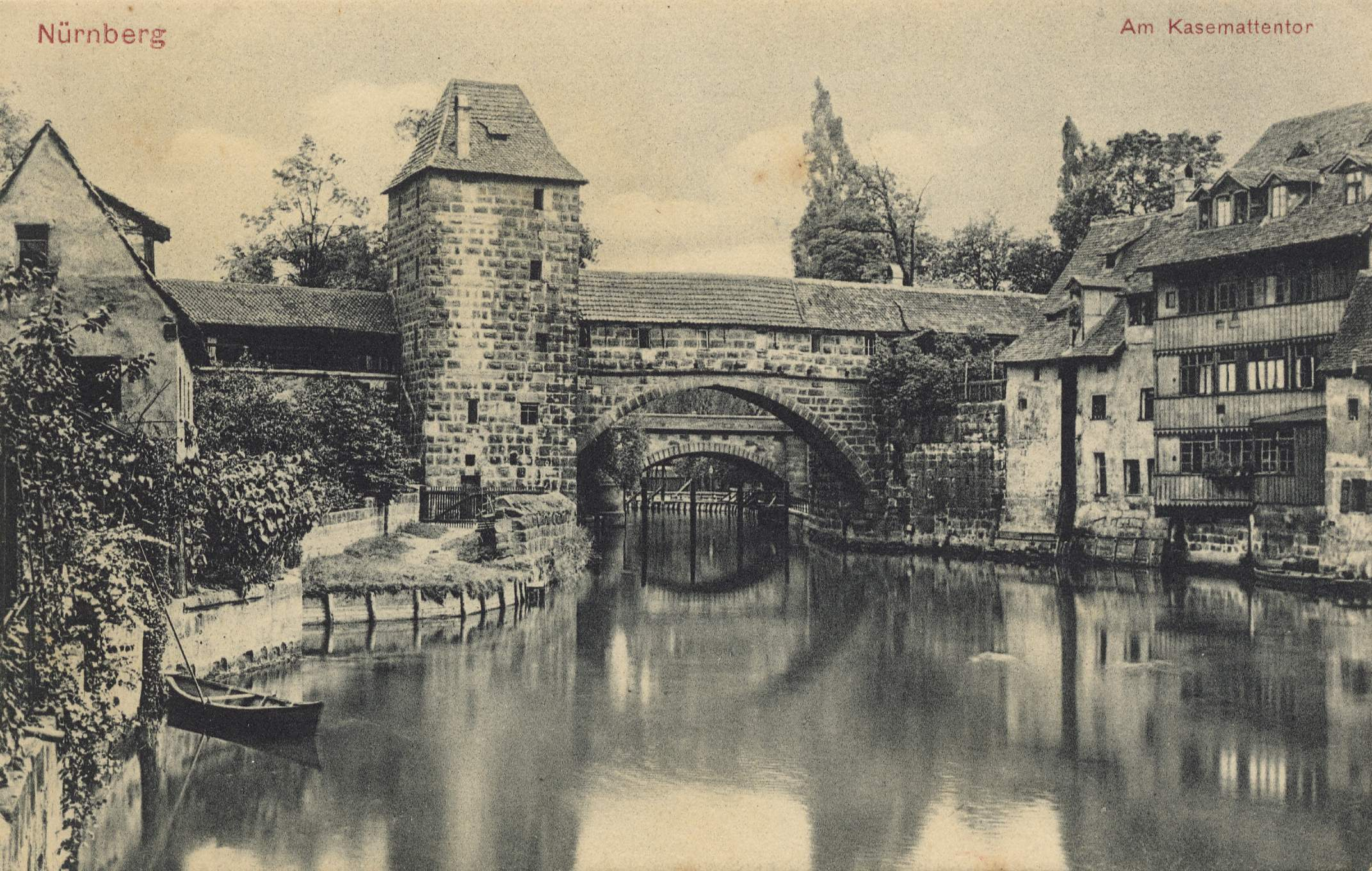
Kasemattentor and the Tratzenzwinger, in 1900

== Literature ==
- Albrecht Dürer: Quite a few lessons on fastening the Stett, lock and stains. Nuremberg, 1527 online PDF
- Günther P. Fehring, Anton Ress (†): The city of Nuremberg. Brief inventory, 2nd ed. by Wilhelm Schwemmer, Munich: Dt. Art publ. 1977 [un. Reprint 1982] (= Bayerische Kunstdenkmale; 10), pp. 165ff.
- Walter Haas: A piece of the older Nuremberg city wall at the Kornmarkt, in: Mitteilungen des Verein für Geschichte der Stadt Nürnberg Volume 76, 1989, p. 161 ff. – also online
- Hanns Hubert Hofmann: The Nuremberg city wall. Verlag Nürnberger Presse, Nuremberg 1967
- Reinhard Kalb: That's why every big city envies us: the most beautiful city wall far and wide. In: Nürnberger Zeitung No. 247 of 25 October 2007, Nürnberg plus, S. + 1 – online
- Erich Mulzer: The city fortifications. In: Erich Mulzer: Baedeker Nuremberg – City Guide, 9th edition. By Karl Baedeker. Ostfildern-Kemnat: Baedeker, 2000, 134 S., ISBN 3-87954-024-1 – also online
- Kurt Müller, Erich Mulzer: The first breach in Nuremberg's city wall. In: Nürnberger Altstadtberichte, Ed .: Altstadtfreunde Nürnberg, No. 15 (1990), pp. 37–80 (documented with photographs)
- Erich Mulzer: Vom dealing with a possible world cultural heritage. In: Nürnberger Altstadtberichte, Ed .: Altstadtfreunde Nürnberg e. V., No. 25 (2000), pp. 27–62 (This refers to the Nuremberg city wall. Documented with photographs)
- Franz Willax: Nuremberg city wall in the decade before the 30 Years War. In: Messages from the Altnürnberger Landschaft e. V., 1990, No. 1, pp. 210–214
- Franz Willax: The fortifications of Gustav Adolf of Sweden around Nuremberg 1632. In: Communications of the Association for the History of the City of Nuremberg, Vol. 82. 1995, online

== Sources and external links ==
- Media related to City walls of Nuremberg at Wikimedia Commons
- baukunst-nuernberg Map and photographs (German only)
- Old Town Festival
