= Jeffrey Chipps Smith =

American art historian

- Awards: Berlin Prize (2010)

Academic work
- Discipline: art history
- Main interests: Northern Renaissance and Baroque art and architecture

Jeffrey Chipps Smith is an American art historian specialising in the Northern Renaissance and Baroque art and architecture. He has published a number of prize winning books on art history. In 2005 he wrote the introduction for a reprint of Erwin Panofsky's classic "The Life and Art of Albrecht Dürer". He is an inaugural co-editor of the Journal of the Historians of Netherlandish Art.

== Publications ==
- New Perspectives on the Art of Renaissance Nuremberg: Five Essays. Austin, 1985
- German Sculpture of the Later Renaissance, c. 1520-1580: Art in an Age of Uncertainty. Princeton, 1994
- Sensuous Worship: Jesuits and the Art of the Early Catholic Reformation in Germany. Princeton, 2002
- The Northern Renaissance. London: Taschen, 2004
- The Art of the Goldsmith in late Fifteenth-Century Germany: The Kimbell Virgin and Her Bishop. New Haven, 2006
- The Essential Dürer. Philadelphia, 2010
- Dürer. London, 2012
