= James S. Famiglietti =

Jay Famiglietti delivering the ministerial-level keynote at UNCCD COP 17 in Mongolia, August 2026.

James S. (Jay) Famiglietti is a satellite hydrologist and Global Futures Professor in the School of Sustainability at Arizona State University, where he also serves as the Director of Science for the Arizona Water Innovation Initiative.

Previously, he was Executive Director of Canada's Global Institute for Water Security at the University of Saskatchewan.

Prior to that he was the Senior Water Scientist at the NASA Jet Propulsion Laboratory in Pasadena, California, a professor of Earth System Science at the University of California, Irvine, and a professor a professor in the Department of Geological Sciences at the University of Texas at Austin.

== Education ==
Famiglietti received his B.S. in Geology from Tufts University in 1982 and his M.S. in Hydrology from the University of Arizona in 1986. He continued his graduate studies at Princeton University, where he earned both his M.A. and Ph.D. in Civil Engineering.

== Research and Projects ==
Famiglietti is known for his research using satellites and developing computer models to track changing freshwater availability around the globe.

While chair of the board of the Consortium of Universities for the Advancement of Hydrologic Science (CUAHSI), he led the Community Hydrologic Modeling Platform (CHyMP) effort to accelerate the development of hydrological models for use in addressing global issues related to water, food, economic, climate, and global security. Between 2008 and 2011, he led a series of three community workshops that explicitly recommended the development of a National Water Model for the United States, and outlined a strategic implementation plan.

He continued model development efforts at UC Irvine and at NASA JPL, where he led the Western States Water Mission and he was founding Chief Scientist of the Western Water Applications Office.

His team pioneered the use of GRACE for remote sensing of groundwater storage changes. Their work has revealed unsustainable groundwater use and the rapid rates of groundwater depletion in the world's major aquifers. This research was recognized by NASA as the primary justification for the selection of the GRACE Follow-On (GRACE-FO) as a climate continuation mission, accelerating the launch of a second GRACE mission from 2025 to 2018.

== Awards and honors ==
In 2026, Famiglietti received the Creativity Prize of the Prince Sultan Bin Abdulaziz International Prize for Water and the American Water Resources Association's David R. Maidment Award for Exemplary Contributions to Water Resources Data. The same year, he was selected as the International Association of Hydrogeologists' inaugural Distinguished Lecturer. In 2023, he delivered the Boussinesq Lecture and received the AGU's Peter S. Eagleson Hydrologic Sciences Award in 2020. In 2018, he was appointed Canada 150 Research Chair in Hydrology and Remote Sensing at the University of Saskatchewan.

Famiglietti’s earlier honors include election as a Fellow of the American Geophysical Union (AGU) and of the Geological Society of America (GSA). In 2012 he was selected as the GSA's Birdsall-Dreiss Distinguished Lecturer. During that year he delivered over 50 lectures in the United States and internationally on the topics of water cycle change and on the need to advance hydrological modeling capabilities. He was also selected as one of two 2014 David Keith Todd Lecturers of the Groundwater Resources Association of California. In 2010, Famiglietti was the recipient of the Shimizu Visiting Professorship at Stanford University in Civil and Environmental Engineering. Other notable honors include being awarded the Outstanding Contributions to Undergraduate Education honor in 2005 by UC Irvine, and the NASA New Investigator Award in 1996.

== Publications ==
Famiglietti has published a number of academic research reports and articles, on topics ranging from soil moisture, to the remote sensing of groundwater availability and the effects of climate change on water balance. Notable publications include Satellite-Based Estimates of Groundwater Depletion in India, Satellites Measure Recent Rates of Groundwater Depletion in California’s Central Valley (2011), The Global Groundwater Crisis (2014), Quantifying Renewable Groundwater Stress with GRACE, Emerging trends in global freshwater availability, Groundwater Depletion in California’s Central Valley Accelerates During Megadrought (2022), Mapping groundwater-dependent ecosystems globally exposes protection needs (2024), Unprecedented continental drying, shrinking freshwater availability, and increasing land contributions to sea level rise (2025), and the World Bank report Continental Drying: A Threat to Our Common Future (2025).

Beyond academia, Famiglietti has published a number of op-eds in major national newspapers including the Los Angeles Times, and the San Francisco Chronicle and The New York Times, where he published Will we have to pump the Great Lakes to California to feed the nation? (2024). Among these, his March 12, 2015 LA Times op-ed attracted media and public attention. He has also been a regular contributor to the National Geographic Water Currents blog and to Huffington Post.
