= List of engravings by Albrecht Dürer =

The following is a very incomplete list of engravings by the German painter and engraver Albrecht Dürer.

Image	Title	Year	Technique	Dimensions	Bartsch
	Conversion of Paul	1494	Copper engraving	295 × 217 mm	
	Young Woman Attacked by Death; or The Ravisher	1495–1495	Copper engraving	110 × 92 mm	B92
	The Great Courier	1494–1495	Copper engraving	100 × 115 mm	
	The Holy Family with the Dragonfly	1495	Copper engraving	151 × 140 mm	B44
	The Ill-Assorted Couple; or the Offer of Love	1495	Copper engraving	151 × 140 mm	B93
	Five Lansquenets and an Oriental on Horseback	1495	Copper engraving	133 × 147 mm	B88
	St Jerome Penitent in the Wilderness	1494–1498	Copper engraving	316 × 225 mm	B61
	The Penance of St John Chrysostom	1494–1498	Copper engraving	183 × 119 mm	B63
	The Deformed Landser Sow	1494–1498	Copper engraving	118 × 126 mm	B95
	The Prodigal Son	1494–1498	Copper engraving	247 × 191 mm	B28
	The Small Fortune	1495–1496	Copper engraving	120 × 66 mm	B78
	The Small Courier	1496	Copper engraving	110 × 78 mm	B80
	A Cook and his Wife	1496	Copper engraving	109 × 77 mm	B84
	Three Peasants in Conversation	1496–1497	Copper engraving	108 × 77 mm	B86
	Lady on Horseback and Lansquenet	1496–1497	Copper engraving	106 × 77 mm	B82
	An Oriental Family	1496–1497	Copper engraving	111 × 79 mm	B85
	Peasant and His Wife	1496–1498	Copper engraving	109 × 77 mm	B83
	The Four Naked Women; or The Four Witches	1497	Copper engraving	194 × 135 mm	B75
	Young Couple Threatened by Death; or the Promenade	1496–1500	Copper engraving	194 × 120 mm	B94
	The Madonna with the Monkey	1496–1500	Copper engraving	190 × 121 mm	B42
	The Temptation of the Idler; or The Dream of the Doctor	1496–1500	Copper engraving	190 × 121 mm	B76
	The Sea Monster	1496–1500	Copper engraving	248 × 189 mm	B71
	Hercules at the Crossroad	1496–1500	Copper engraving	320 × 222 mm	B73
	Sol Justitiae; or The Judge	1498–1501	Copper engraving	105 × 76 mm	B79
	St Sebastian, Tied to a Column	1497–1501	Copper engraving	106 × 76 mm	B56
	Virgin and Child Standing on a Crescent Moon	1498–1500	Copper engraving	107 × 77 mm	B30
	The Man of Sorrows with Arms Outstretched	1500	Copper engraving	117 × 71 mm	B20
	St Sebastian, Tied To a Tree	1499–1503	Copper engraving	115 × 71 mm	B55
	The Virgin and Child with Saint Anne	1500–1502	Copper engraving	116 × 71 mm	B29
	St Eustace	1499–1503	Copper engraving	359 × 261 mm	B57
	The Witch	1498–1502	Copper engraving	115 × 71 mm	B67
	Three Putti with Trumpets, Shield, and Helmet	1498–1502	Copper engraving	114 × 72 mm	B66
	Nemesis; or Good Fortune	1501–1502	Copper engraving	330 × 230 mm	B77
	Apollo and Diana	1501–1506	Copper engraving	115 × 70 mm	B68
	St George on Foot	1500–1505	Copper engraving	116 × 72 mm	B53
	A Standard Bearer	1502–1503	Copper engraving	115 × 70 mm	B87
	Coat of Arms with Lion and Rooster	1500–1503	Copper engraving	182 × 118 mm	B100
	Madonna on a Grassy Bench	1503	Copper engraving	114 × 71 mm	B34
	Coat of Arms with a Skull	1503	Copper engraving	220 × 158 mm	B101
	Nativity	1504	Copper engraving	186 × 120 mm	B2
	Adam and Eve	1504	Copper engraving	248 × 192 mm	B1
	Satyr Family	1505	Copper engraving	115 × 70 mm	B69
	Small Horse	1505	Copper engraving	165 × 108 mm	B96
	Large Horse	1505	Copper engraving	167 × 119 mm	B97
	St George on Horseback	1508	Copper engraving	109 × 85 mm	B54
	Crucifixion	1508	Copper engraving	134 × 98 mm	B24
	Virgin on a Crescent with a Starry Crown	1508	Copper engraving	119 × 75 mm	B31
	The Holy Family with St John, The Magdalen and Nicodemus	1510	Drypoint	216 × 190 mm	B43
	Madonna with the Pear	1511	Copper engraving	160 × 107 mm	B41
	St Jerome by the Pollard Willow	1512	Drypoint	208 × 185 mm	B59
	Man of Sorrows with Hands Bound	1512	Drypoint	118 × 74 mm	B21
	Sudarium Displayed by Two Angels (Sudarium of St Veronica)	1513	Copper engraving	100 × 139 mm	B25
	Madonna by the Tree	1513	Copper engraving	117 × 75 mm	B35
	Knight, Death and the Devil	1513	Copper engraving	246 × 188 mm	B98
	Peasant Couple Dancing	1514	Copper engraving	117 × 74 mm	B90
	The Bagpiper	1514	Copper engraving	116 × 75 mm	B91
	St Jerome in his Study	1514	Copper engraving	247 × 188 mm	B60
	Madonna by the Wall	1514	Copper engraving	147 × 101 mm	B40
	Melencolia I	1514	Copper engraving	239 × 188 mm	B74
	Virgin and Child on the Crescent Moon with a Diadem	1514	Copper engraving	118 × 76 mm	B33
	The Apostle Paul	1514	Copper engraving	118 × 74 mm	B50
	The Apostle Thomas	1514	Copper engraving	117 × 75 mm	B48
	Man of Sorrows, Seated	1515	Etching	112 × 67 mm	B22
	Agony in the Garden	1515	Etching	224 × 157 mm	B19
	The Desperate Man	1513–1517	Etching	186 × 135 mm	B70
	Sudarium Spread Out by an Angel	1516	Etching	184 × 133 mm	B26
	Abduction of Proserpine on a Unicorn	1516	Etching	315 × 211 mm	B72
	The Virgin on a Crescent with a Crown of Stars and a Sceptre	1516	Copper engraving	118 × 74 mm	B32
	Madonna Crowned by Two Angels	1518	Copper engraving	155 × 101 mm	B39
	Landscape with Cannon	1518	Etching	218 × 324 mm	B99
	Cardinal Albrecht of Brandenburg; or The Small Cardinal	1519	Copper engraving	146 × 96 mm	B102
	St Antony	1519	Copper engraving	98 × 142 mm	B58
	The Peasant and His Wife at the Market	1519	Copper engraving	115 × 72 mm	B89
	Madonna Nursing	1519	Copper engraving	115 × 74 mm	B36
	Madonna Crowned by an Angel	1520	Copper engraving	138 × 99 mm	B37
	Madonna with the Swaddled Infant	1520	Copper engraving	141 × 96 mm	B38
	St Christopher Facing to the Right	1521	Copper engraving	118 × 75 mm	B52
	St Christopher Facing to the Left	1521	Copper engraving	118 × 75 mm	B51
	Cardinal Albrecht of Brandenburg; or the Great Cardinal	1523	Copper engraving	174 × 127 mm	B103
	St Bartholomew	1523	Copper engraving	121 × 75 mm	B47
	St Simon	1523	Copper engraving	118 × 75 mm	B49
	Large Crucifixion in outline only	c. 1523	Copper engraving	320 × 226 mm	
	Portrait of Frederick the Wise	1524	Copper engraving	193 × 126 mm	B104
	Willibald Pirckheimer	1524	Copper engraving	182 × 111 mm	B106
	St Philip	1526	Copper engraving	122 × 76 mm	B46
	Philipp Melanchthon	1526	Copper engraving	177 × 127 mm	B105
	Erasmus of Rotterdam	1526	Copper engraving	249 × 193 mm	B107
	Man of Sorrows by the Column (Passion No. 1)	1509	Copper engraving	117 × 74 mm	B3
	Agony in the Garden (Passion No. 2)	1508	Copper engraving	117 × 74 mm	B4
	Betrayal of Christ (Passion No. 3)	1508	Copper engraving	117 × 74 mm	B5
	Christ before Caiaphas (Passion No. 4)	1512	Copper engraving	117 × 74 mm	B6
	Christ before Pilate (Passion No. 5)	1512	Copper engraving	117 × 74 mm	B7
	Flagellation (Passion No. 6)	1512	Copper engraving	117 × 74 mm	B8
	Christ Crowned with Thorns (Passion No. 7)	1512	Copper engraving	117 × 74 mm	B9
	Ecce Homo (Passion No. 8)	1512	Copper engraving	117 × 74 mm	B10
	Pilate Washing his Hands (Passion No. 9)	1512	Copper engraving	117 × 74 mm	B11
	Bearing of the Cross (Passion No. 10)	1512	Copper engraving	117 × 74 mm	B12
	Crucifixion (Passion No. 11)	1511	Copper engraving	117 × 74 mm	B13
	Lamentation over Christ (Passion No. 12)	1512	Copper engraving	117 × 74 mm	B14
	Deposition (Passion No. 13)	1512	Copper engraving	117 × 74 mm	B15
	Harrowing of Hell; or Christ in Limbo (Passion No. 14)	1512	Copper engraving	117 × 74 mm	B16
	Resurrection (Passion No. 15)	1512	Copper engraving	117 × 74 mm	B17
	St Peter and St John Healing the Cripple (Passion No. 16)	1513	Copper engraving	117 × 74 mm	B18

== See also ==
- List of paintings by Albrecht Dürer
- List of woodcuts by Albrecht Dürer

== Sources ==
- Borer (Alain) & Bon (Cécile). L'oeuvre Graphique De Albrecht Dürer. Hubschmid & Bouret. 1980.
