= Knight, Death and the Devil =

Engraving by Albrecht Dürer

- Ritter, Tod und Teufel (German)
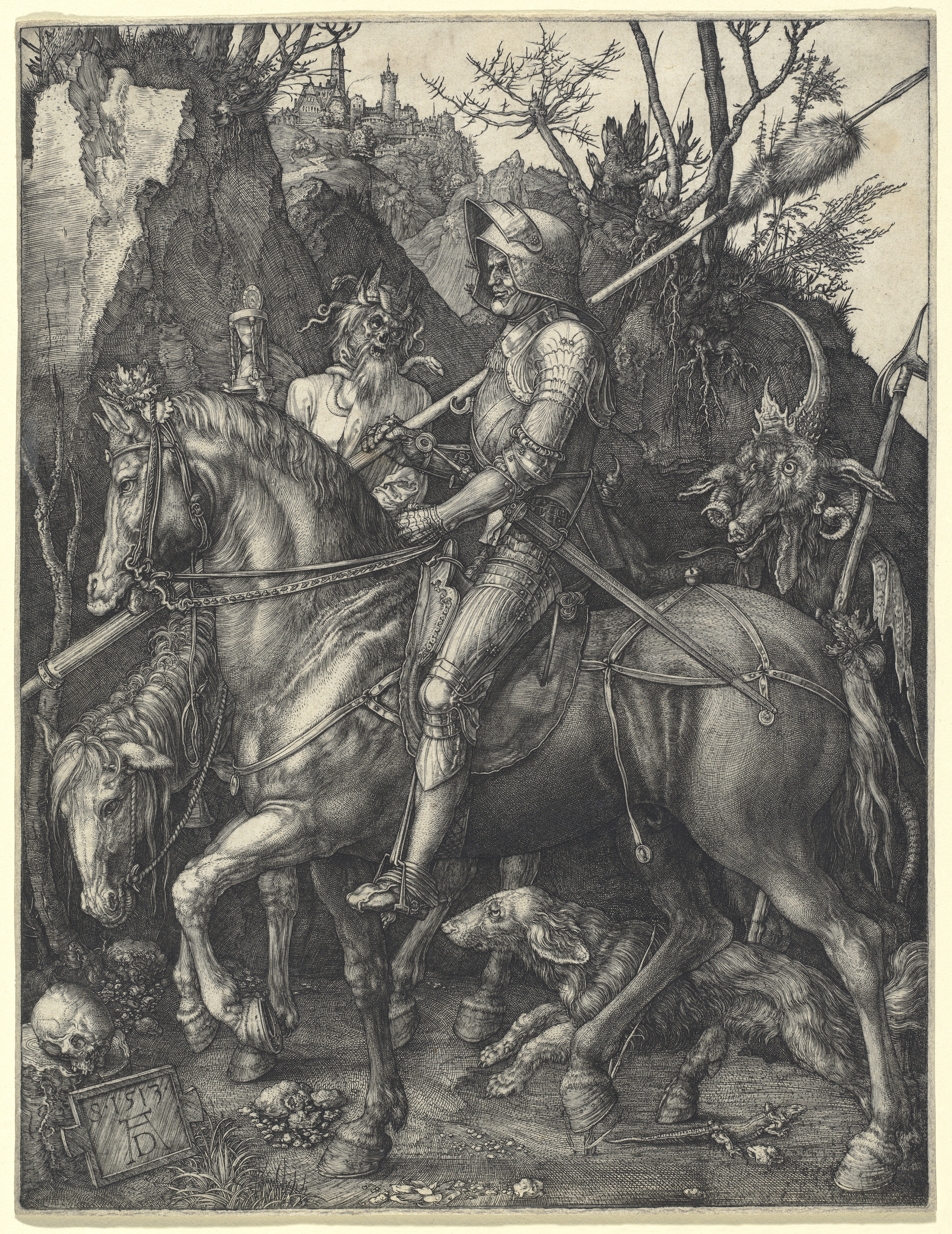
- Artist: Albrecht Dürer
- Year: 1513
- Medium: Engraving
- Movement: German Renaissance
- Dimensions: 24.3 cm × 18.8 cm (9.6 in × 7.4 in)

Knight, Death and the Devil (German: Ritter, Tod und Teufel) is a large 1513 engraving by the German artist Albrecht Dürer, one of the three Meisterstiche (master prints) completed during a period when he almost ceased to work in paint or woodcuts to focus on engravings. The image is infused with complex iconography and symbolism, the precise meaning of which has been argued over for centuries.

A stolid armoured knight on a proud horse, accompanied by his faithful dog, rides through a wild narrow gorge flanked by a goat-headed devil and the figure of death riding a pale horse. Death's rotting corpse holds an hourglass, a reminder of the shortness of life. The rider moves through the scene looking away from the creatures lurking around him, and appears almost contemptuous of the threats, and is thus often seen as symbol of courage; the knight's armour, the horse which towers in size over the beasts, and the oak leaves are symbolic of the resilience of faith, while the knight's plight may represent Christians' earthly journey towards the Kingdom of Heaven symbolized by the city on the hill.

It was widely copied and had a large influence on later German writers. Philosopher Friedrich Nietzsche referenced the work in his work on dramatic theory The Birth of Tragedy (1872) to exemplify pessimism. Later in the 20th century the engraving was used by the Nazis, identifying their cause with that of the knight on horseback.

== Composition ==
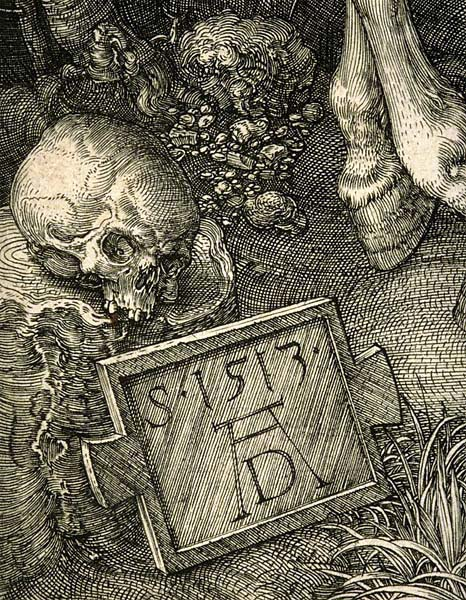
Detail

Both of his two other Meisterstiche (Melencolia I and St. Jerome in His Study ) contain a skull-like object, a dog, and an hourglass, and all three are identical in size. The engraving is heavily indebted to the Gothic style. Many of the forms blend into each other. The outline of the horse is built from a series of interlocking curves, while the knight's chin is woven into the line of his helmet. These two central figures are surrounded by a tangled mass of branches, harness and hair, which according to art historian Raymond Stites contrast with the relatively solid figure of the knight and his horse to set them as a "tangible idea in a world of changing forms". The man is shown looking doggedly straight ahead; he does not allow his line of vision to be interrupted or distracted by the demons beside him.

According to Elizabeth Lunday the "skeletal figure of death stands ghostly pale against the darkness of a shadowy crag, while the devil, a multihorned goatlike creature, skulks amongst straggly tree roots." Death is shown with his horse in the left background and rendered without nose or lips in lighter shades than the other figures. A skull is seen in the lower foreground, directly in the Knight's path, whilst a dog is running between the two horses.

Death, the Devil, and the landscape are all rendered in a bleakly northern manner. The surrounding characters are threatening to the knight, who is seemingly protected by the literal and figurative armor of his faith.

It is believed by some art historians to be linked with publications of the Dutch humanist and theologian Erasmus's Enchiridion militis Christiani (Handbook of a Christian soldier). Erasmus' book builds on the well-known biblical metaphor of the Christian soldier in Ephesians 6:13-17 "put on the full armour of God." The engraving draws from Psalm 23; "Though I walk through the valley of the shadow of death, I will fear no evil".

Knight, Death and the Devil is dated and signed by the artist; the bottom left of the tablet is scribed "S. (=Salus/in the year of grace) 1513."

== Interpretation ==
Knight on Horseback, a study c. 1512–13.

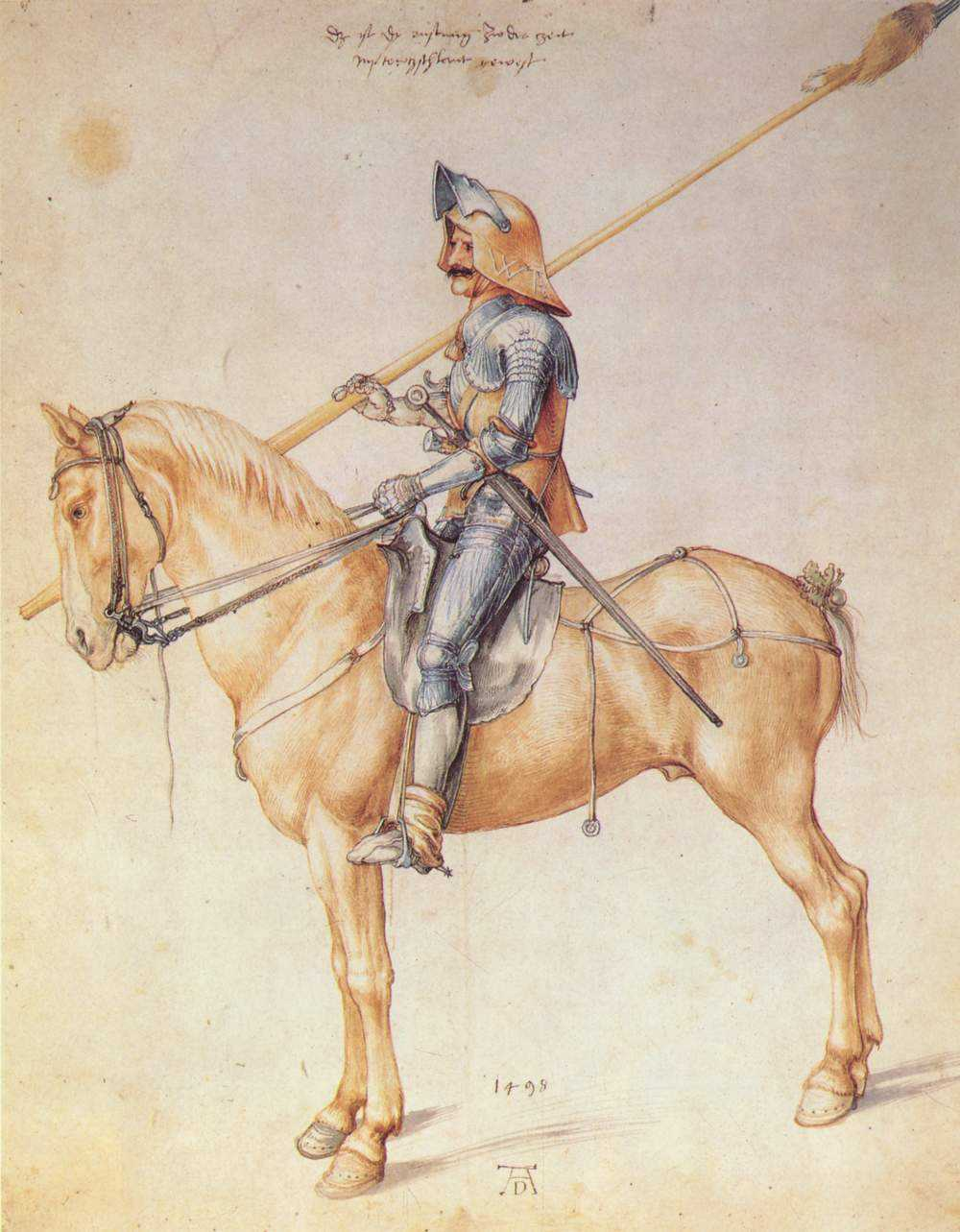
Study of a rider, 1498

It is generally believed that the portrayal is a literal, though pointed, portrayal of the knight's Christian faith, and also of the ideals of humanism, with allegorical elements. Art historian Erwin Panofsky wrote that the engraving was probably inspired by The Handbook of the Christian Knight by Erasmus (Dürer's future friend), citing the following passage:

In order not to be deterred from the path of virtue because it seems rough and dreary, and because you must constantly fight these three enemies: the flesh, the Devil, and the world, this third rule shall be proposed to you: all those spooks and phantasms which come upon you as in the very gorges of Hades must be deemed for nought after the example of Virgil's Aeneas.

In Panofsky's interpretation, the dog is a symbol of faithfulness to God.

Dürer created it while in the service of the Emperor Maximilian. It was not a commission and does not contain an overtly political message. It reaches back to a medieval sense of morality, and is replete with Gothic imagery. The engraving bears similarities in mood and tone to one of Dürer's other great prints, Melencolia I. The New York Times art critic Holland Cotter noted that the composition followed soon after Dürer's beloved mother had died a painful death.

The 19th-century Austrian art historian Moritz Thausing said that Dürer had created Knight, Death and the Devil as part of a four-work cycle, each designed to illustrate one of the four temperaments. According to Thausing, the work was intended to represent sanguinity, hence the "S" engraved in the work.

Dorothy Getlein said the knight looks resigned, and his facial features are downcast. His gloomy posture is in contrast to the sturdy look of his horse. While his armor may protect him against the surrounding demons, the skull on a stump is held in front of his horse, and the sand in the hourglass held by Death falls in the sight of the knight. According to Getlein, "there is a sense of obsolescence about the knight accompanied by Death and the Devil."

In 1970 writer Sten Karling, and later Ursula Meyer, said that the work did not seek to glorify the knight, but instead depicts a "robber knight" (Raubritter). They point to the supposed lack of Christian or religious symbolism in the work and to the fox's tail wrapped on top of the knight's lance – in early Christian Greek symbolism the fox was a symbol of greed, cunning and treachery, as well as lust and whoring. Knights were commonly depicted in contemporary art with a fox tail tied to the tip of their lance. The fox tail was a common form of protective amulet. In this interpretation Death and the Devil are merely the knight's companions on his journey, not omens.

== Reception ==
The work is considered one among three of Dürer's Meisterstiche ("master prints"); along with Saint Jerome in His Study (1514) and Melencolia I (1514). In particular, the horse is skillfully rendered in geometric shapes that call to mind Leonardo da Vinci and reflect the Renaissance interest in natural sciences and anatomy.

The work was mentioned by Giorgio Vasari as one of "several sheets of such excellence that nothing finer can be achieved".

Most print rooms with a significant collection will have a copy, and there are many, often late and worn, impressions in private collections. In 2017 a 1513 print in good condition sold for US$187,000.

Fifty years after Dürer's print, 15-year-old engraver Jan Wierix made a copy.

== Influence ==
=== Germany ===
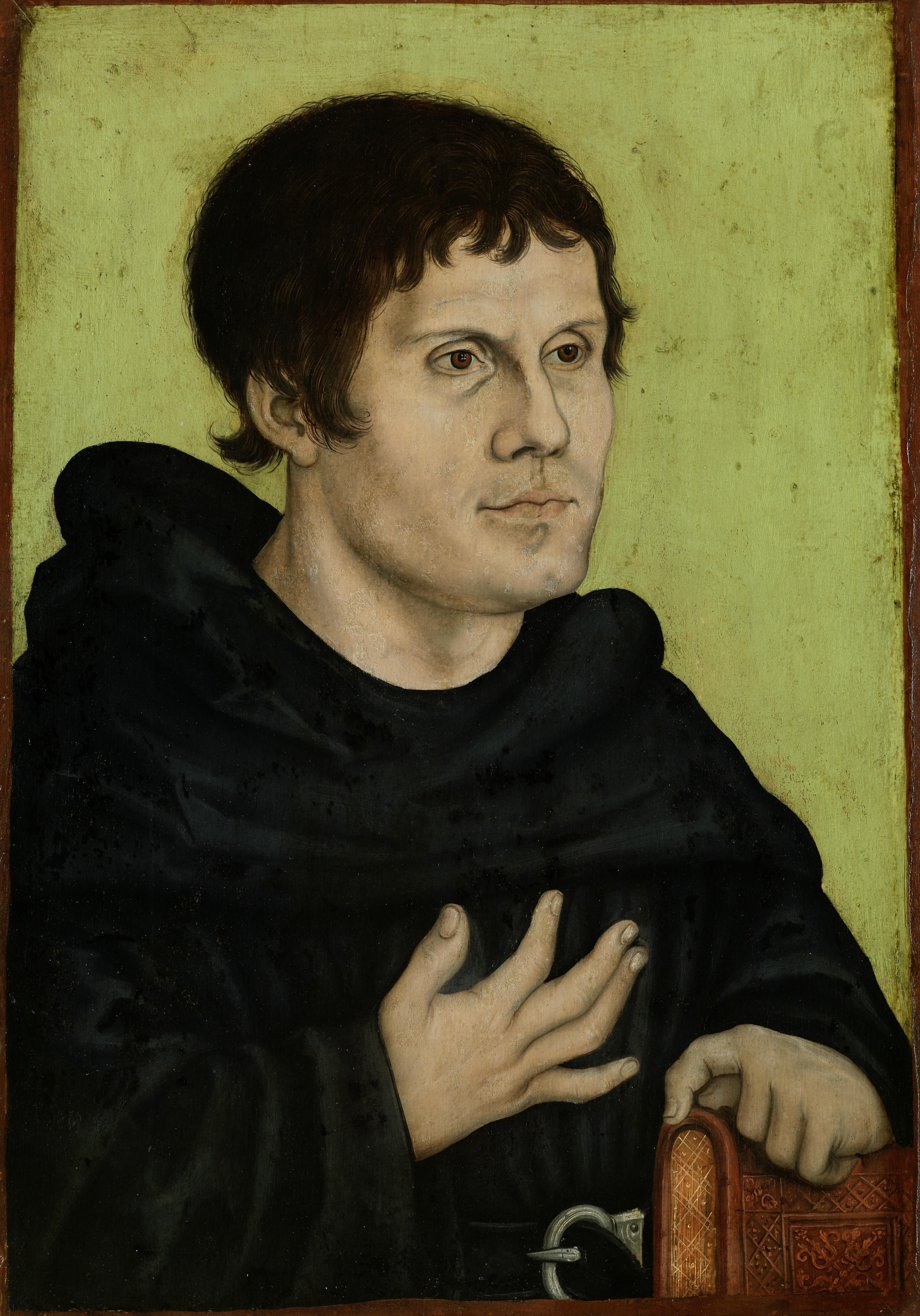
Posthumous portrait of Martin Luther as an Augustinian friar

In 1870 Friedrich Nietzsche gave a print of the engraving to Richard Wagner. The work was significant to Nietzsche as a representation of a "brave future" and its central subject a "symbol of our existence." As such, he gave a copy to his sister on the eve of her emigration to Paraguay. After the First World War, writers Thomas Mann and Ernst Bertram described the work as close to what Nietzsche could teach about the fate of Germany; the embodiment of the Renaissance and the teachings of Martin Luther, and as described by Gary Shapiro, they believed it was "invoked in order to intensify the sense of resolute determination in the absence of all hope." Although Dürer did not meet Luther, his writings indicate that he admired him highly, and the engraving may well have been intended as a tribute to him.

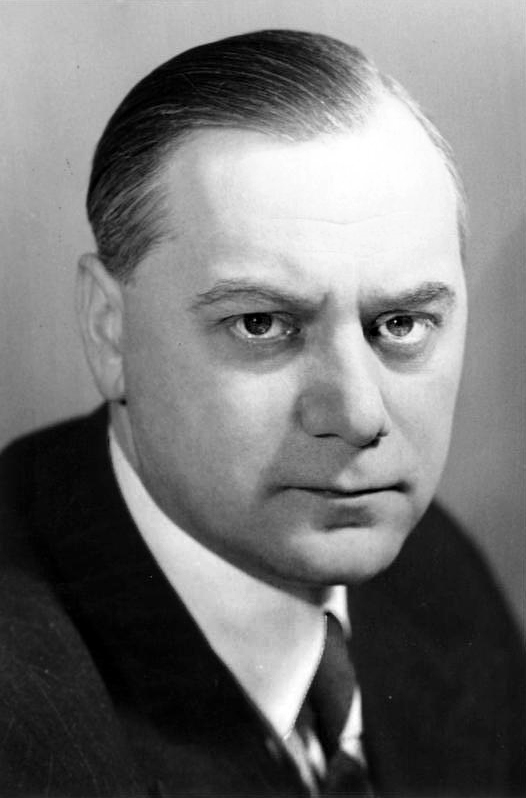
Nazi theorist and ideologue Alfred Rosenberg

Dürer was idealised from the 1920s by ideologues within the Nazi party as "the most German of German artists". At a 1927 Nazi rally the philosopher, Nazi theorist and ideologue, and later convicted war criminal Alfred Rosenberg compared the assembled stormtroopers to the warrior in Knight, Death and the Devil, exclaiming that "in everything that you do, remember that for the National Socialists only one thing counts: to cry out to the world: And even if the world is full of devils, we must win anyway!" In 1933, the mayor of Nuremberg presented Hitler with an original print of Knight, Death and the Devil, and described Hitler as the "knight without fear or blame, who as the Führer of the new German Reich, once again carried and multiplied the fame of the old imperial city of Nuremberg to the whole world."

=== English Illustration ===
John Tenniel twice made illustrations based on Knight, Death and the Devil: "Alice and the White Knight," the frontispiece to Lewis Carroll's Through the Looking Glass, and a political cartoon called "The Knight and His Companion," published in the April 5, 1887, issue of Punch, wherein the knight is used to represent Otto von Bismarck, while the devil stands in for socialism, and for which Tenniel provided the subtitle "(Suggested by Albert [sic] Dürer's famous picture.)"

=== Other writers ===
In 1968 the Argentinian publisher Galerna published a volume in their book series Variations on a Theme, the theme of this volume being Dürer's engraving. Among the authors asked to write was the Argentine writer and poet Jorge Luis Borges, who wrote a poem entitled "Ritter, Tod, und Teufel (I)". Borges later wrote another poem named "Ritter, Tod und Teufel (II)", published by Atlántida. In the first poem he praises the knight's courage, writing, "Being / brave, Teuton, you surely will be / worthy of the Devil and Death." In the second he compares his own state to the knight, writing that "It's me and not the Knight that the old, white-faced man, head crowned with writhing snakes, exhorts."

Another author who wrote for Variations on a Theme was Marco Denevi, in his story "A Dog in Dürer's Etching The Knight, Death and the Devil." In it, Denevi does not try to tell who the knight is or which specific war the knight is returning from, because "all wars are fragments of a single war, all wars make up the nameless war, simply the war, the War, so that although the knight returns from traveling through a fragment of the war, it is as if he had journeyed through all wars and all the war." Denevi focuses on the presence of the dog, who "has smelt on the knight's armor the stench of Death and Hell, because the dog already knows what the knight does not know, it knows that in the knight's groin a pustule has begun to distill the juices of the Plague, and that Death and the Devil are waiting for the knight at the foot of the hill to take him with them."

Ingmar Bergman said that the image was an inspiration for The Seventh Seal.

== See also ==
- List of engravings by Albrecht Dürer
- List of woodcuts by Albrecht Dürer

== Sources ==
- Bailey, Martin. Dürer. London: Phidon Press, 1995. ISBN 0-7148-3334-7
- Borges, Jorges Luis. In Praise of Darkness. E.P. Dutton, 1974
- Brion, Marcel. Dürer. London: Thames and Hudson, 1960.
- Cole, William. "Why This Knight Is Different from All Other Knights: Dürer and the Medieval Romance of Chivalry." Studium 5, 1998.
- Dennis, David. Inhumanities: Nazi Interpretations of Western Culture. Cambridge University Press, 2012. ISBN 978-1-1070-2049-8
- Getlein, Dorothy & Getlein, Dorothy V. The Bite of the Print: Satire and Irony in Woodcuts, Engravings, Etchings, Lithographs and Serigraphs. New York: C. N. Potter, 1963
- Meyer, Ursula. "Political implications of Dürer's 'Knight, Death, and Devil'." Print Collector's Newsletter 16, no. 5, 1976
- Nürnberg, Verlag Hans Carl. Dürer in Dublin: Engravings and woodcuts of Albrecht Dürer. Chester Beatty Library, 1983
- Panofsky, Erwin. The life and art of Albrecht Durer. Princeton University Press, 1945
- Sander, Jochen (ed). Dürer: His Art in Context. Frankfurt: Städel Museum & Prestel, 2013. ISBN 3-7913-5317-9
- Shapiro, Gary. Archaeologies of Vision: Foucault and Nietzsche on Seeing and Saying. University of Chicago Press, 2003. ISBN 978-0-2267-5047-7
- Stites, Raymond. The Arts and Man. New York; London: Whittlesey House, McGraw-hill Book Company, Inc., 1940
