= Albrecht Dürer's magic square =

Detail in the 1514 engraving Melencolia I

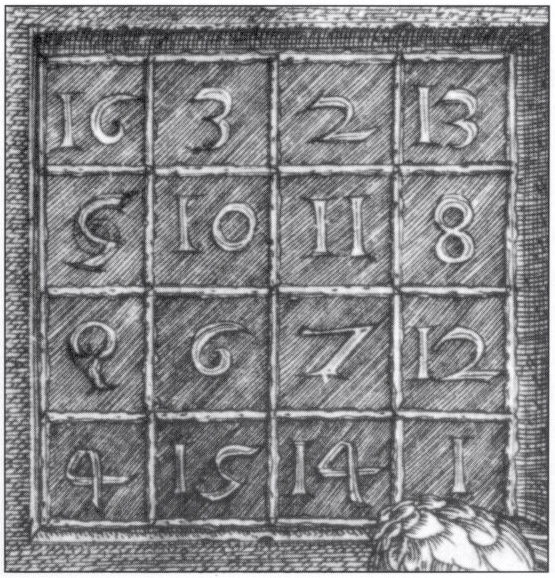
Detail from Melencolia I

Albrecht Dürer's magic square is one of the most famous Magic squares and is depicted in Albrecht Dürer's engraving Melencolia I.

== Properties of sum combinations ==
The Dürer square is a symmetrical magic square and has 86 sum combinations of the magic number 34.

16	3	2	13
5	10	11	8
9	6	7	12
4	15	14	1

For a better overview, all sum combinations are grouped below according to various properties, although other groupings may also be possible. An image in which the relevant sum combinations are marked with a green background color serves as orientation.

Figure 1

Figure 2

Figure 3

Figure 4

Figure 5

Figure 6

To Figure 1: 15 sum combinations:

The horizontal, vertical and diagonal rows as well as the two-row corner squares and the two-row middle square each have the sum 34.

To Figure 2: 21 sum combinations:

The corner numbers of the Dürer square as well as the corner numbers of rectangles and three-row squares that border on the edges each have the sum 34. This also applies to the diagonally inscribed rectangles as well as to the corner numbers of two Latin Crosses and two Crosses of Saint Peter.

To Figure 3: 12 sum combinations:

The horizontal and vertical adjacent number pairs at the center mirrored as well as the horse jumps reflected at the center each have the sum 34.

To Figure 4: 8 sum combinations:

The numbers of the two middle rows and columns in zigzag order and the numbers on the outer rows and columns in zigzag order each have the sum 34.

To Figure 5: 12 sum combinations:

Certain L-shaped and T-shaped patterns each have the sum 34.

To Figure 6: 18 sum combinations:

Other patterns with non-symmetrical combinations, each having a sum of 34.

In addition, the Dürer square has the property that every pair of numbers that is point-symmetrical about the center has the sum 17.

== Properties of square and cubed sum combinations ==
The square numbers of the eight numbers in the fields of the following eight combinations each have the sum 748:

- pair of diagonals,
- pairs in the middle of the edges,
- first and third lines,
- second and fourth lines,
- first and third columns,
- second and fourth columns.

The cubes of the eight numbers in the fields of the following eight combinations each have the sum 9248:

- pair of diagonals,
- pairs in the middle of the edges.

All six combinations of eight form obviously symmetrical patterns.

- The pair of diagonals and the entirety of the pairs in the middle of the edges are each symmetrical to the horizontal and vertical central axes as well as to the two diagonals.
- The combination of the first and third lines as well as those of the second and fourth lines are each symmetrical about the vertical central axis.
- The combination of the first and third columns as well as those of the second and fourth columns are each symmetrical to the horizontal central axis.

In the following figure, the sum of squares properties are shown in green and yellow, and the sum of cubes properties are shown in green.

== See also ==
- Magic square

== Literature ==
- Wolfgang Göbels: Varianten des magischen Quadrats von Albrecht Dürer In: Praxis der Mathematik (PM) Volume 4, No. 35, year 1993, Aulis Verlag.
- Christoph Pöppe: Edle magische Quadrate. In: Spektrum der Wissenschaft January 1996, p. 14 ff
