= Meisterstiche =

Three engravings by Dürer

The Meisterstiche ("master prints") by Dürer are three of his most famous engravings. They are Knight, Death and the Devil (1513), Melencolia I (1514) and St. Jerome in His Study (1514). These three large prints (about 7 by 10 inches (18 by 25 cm)) are often grouped together because of their perceived quality and unity of meaning, although this latter is a matter of scholarly dispute.

Art historian Erwin Panofsky has described them as showing meticulous care in execution and also having complexity and significance in terms of iconography. Panofsky, while recognising that these are Durer's "most famous engravings" and are "not unjustly, known as his 'Meisterstiche'", notes that they "have no appreciable compositional relationship with one another" and should not, in any technical sense, be "considered as 'companion pieces'". They do, Panofsky argues, form "a spiritual unity". Here, Panofsky refers to Friedrich Lippmann's noticing of the scholastic classification of the virtues they represent: the moral, the theological and the intellectual. The Knight showing "the life of the Christian in the practical world of decision and action"; St. Jerome showing "the life of the Saint in the spiritual world of sacred contemplation"; and Melencolia I showing the "life of the secular genius in the rational and imaginative worlds of science and art".

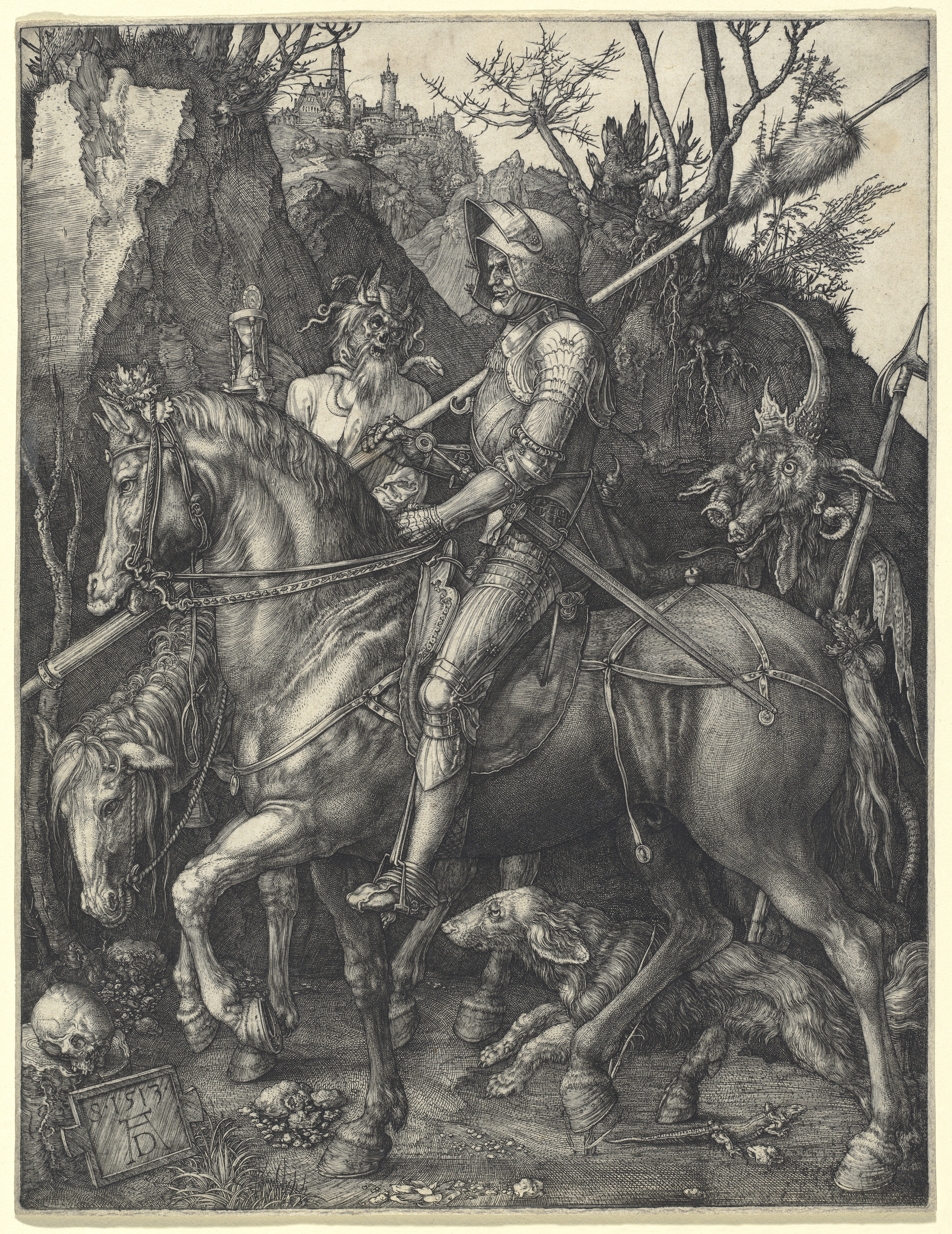
Knight, Death, and the Devil

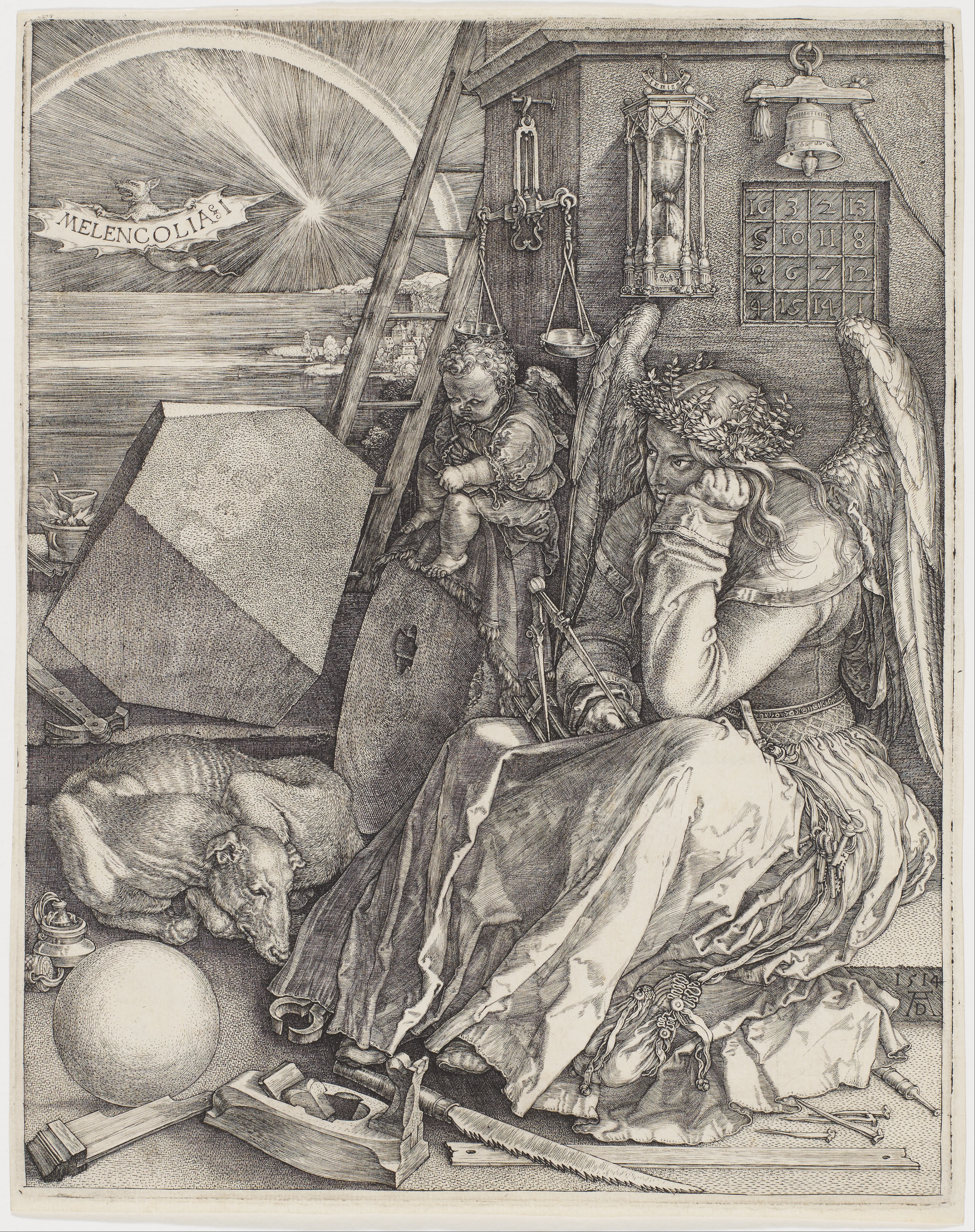
Melencolia I

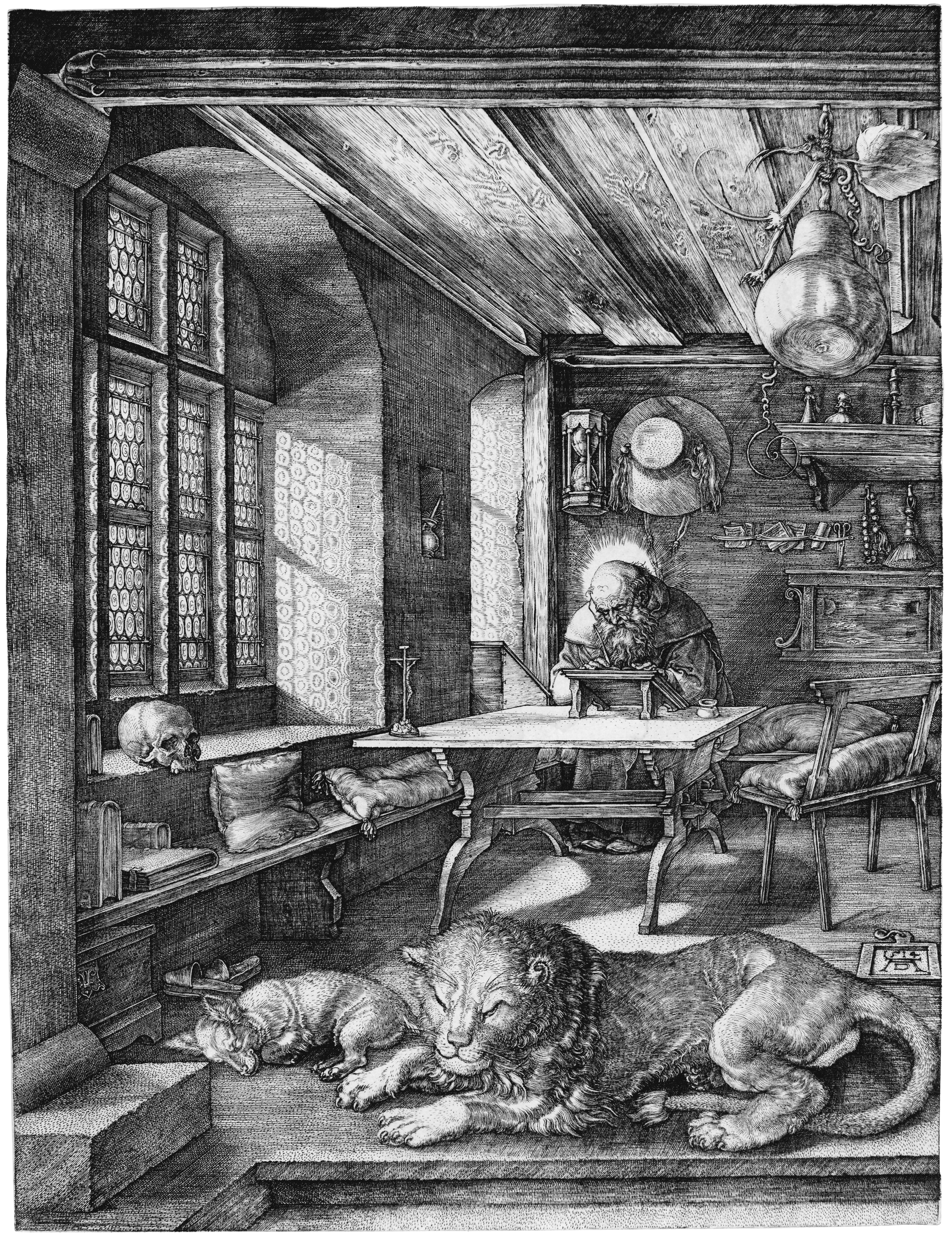
Saint Jerome in His Study

== Other sources ==
- Grigg, Robert (1986) "Studies on Dürer's Diary of His Journey to the Netherlands: The Distribution of the" Melencolia I"." Zeitschrift fur Kunstgeschichte, 398-409.
- Filippi, Elena, and Michael Friel. (1995) Albrecht Dürer's Meisterstiche: proposal for an historical-epochal reading. University of Chicago, Chicago
- Lippmann, F. (1883-1929) Zeichnungen von Albrecht Durer in Nachbildungen (7 vols., vols. VI and VII F. Winkler, ed.), Berlin
