= Saint Jerome in His Study (Dürer) =

Engraving by Albrecht Dürer

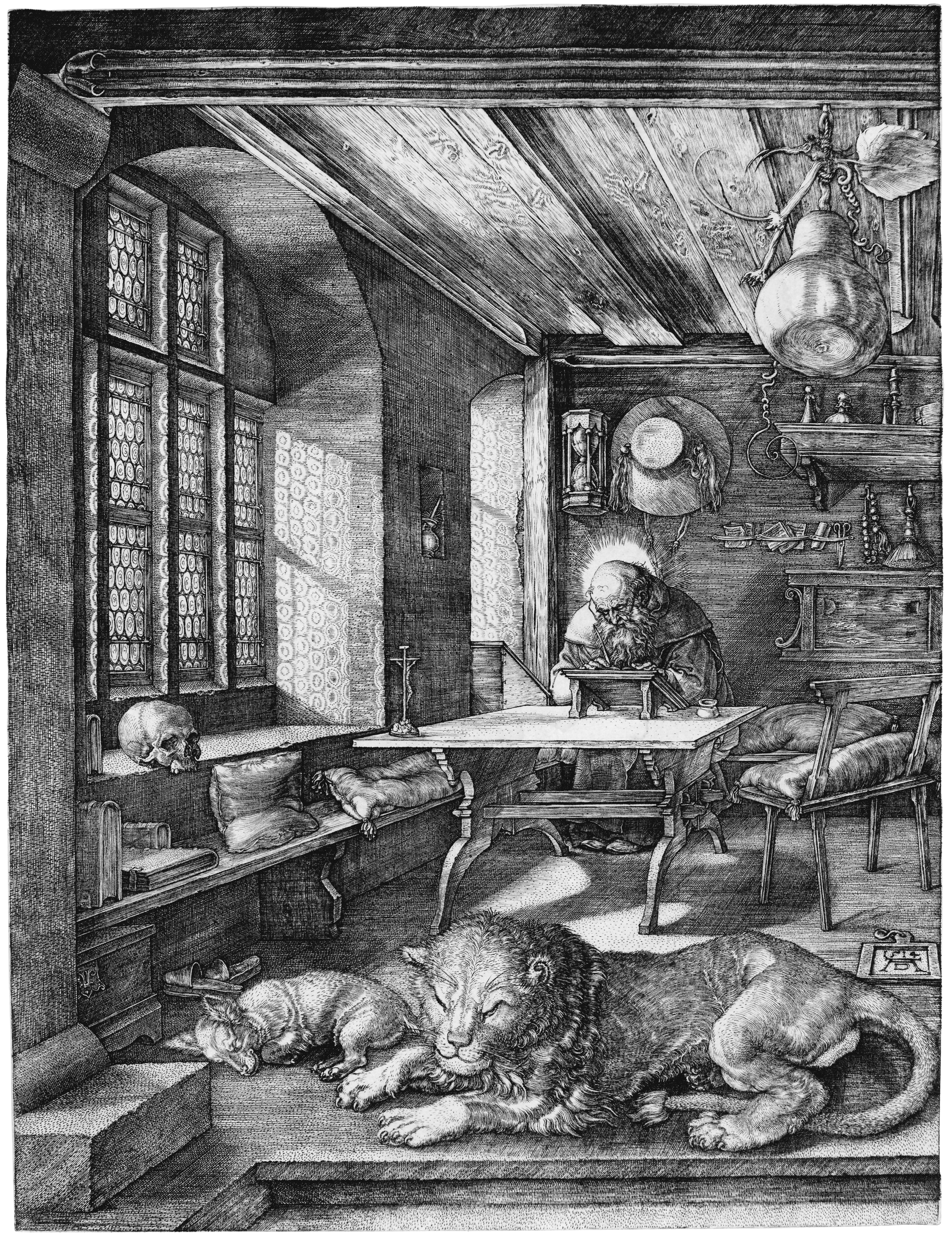
- Artist: Albrecht Dürer
- Year: 1514
- Type: engraving
- Dimensions: 24.7 cm × 18.8 cm (9.7 in × 7.4 in)

Saint Jerome in His Study (German: Der heilige Hieronymus im Gehäus) is a copper engraving of 1514 by the German artist Albrecht Dürer. Saint Jerome is shown sitting behind his desk, engrossed in work. The table, on the corner of which is a cross, is typical of the Renaissance. An imaginary line from Jerome's head passing through the cross would arrive at the skull on the window ledge, as if contrasting death and the Resurrection. The lion in the foreground is part of the traditional iconography of St. Jerome, and near it is a sleeping dog, an animal found frequently in Dürer's works, symbolizing loyalty. Both creatures are part of Jerome's story in the Golden Legend (c. 1260), which contained fanciful hagiographies of saints.

St. Jerome in His Study is often considered as part of a group of three Dürer engravings (his Meisterstiche), the other two being the well-known Melencolia I (1514) and Knight, Death and the Devil (1513). Together they have been viewed as representing the three spheres of activity recognized in medieval times: Knight, Death, and the Devil belongs to the moral sphere and the "active life"; Melencolia I represents the intellectual; and St. Jerome the theological and contemplative life.

The composition is intimate, but the viewer has difficulty locating himself in relation to the picture's space. Thomas Puttfarken suggests that while the scene is very close to the observer, Dürer did not intend the viewer to feel present: "the intimacy is not ours, but the saint's as he is engrossed in study and meditation" (94). Art historian Erwin Panofsky comments on the perspective:

The position of the sight point, quite far off centre, strengthens the impression of a representation determined not by the objective law of the architecture but by the subjective standpoint of the spectator who is just entering – a representation which owes to precisely this perspective arrangement a large part of its peculiarly 'intimate' effect. (Qtd. in Puttfarken, 94)

== Jonah and the gourd vine ==
Using a dried gourd hanging from the rafters, Dürer memorializes Jerome's courage, in the face of a long brewing philological controversy with St. Augustine in his preference for Greek over Latin nomenclature for the fast-growing plant known in Hebrew as קיקיון (qiyqayown) encountered only this once, in the Book of Jonah. The Old Testament text closes abruptly (Jonah 4) with an epistolary warning based on the emblematic trope of a fast-growing vine present in Persian narratives, and popularized widely in certain collections of Aesop's fables such as The Gourd and the Palm-tree. Jerome elected to use hedera (from the Greek, meaning ivy) over the more common Latin cucurbita from which the related English plant name cucumber is derived, perhaps to avoid confusion while making a more perfect analogy to the typology of Christ "I am the Vine, you are the branches". In fact Augustine's view had already prevailed by Dürer's time.

== Skull and Crucifix, and the Hourglass ==
The positioning of the Crucifix on Jerome's desk is such that when he looks at it he can also see the skull by the window. Looking at the crucifix reminds of the resurrection of Jesus, which righted the wrongs of Adam leading to death, represented by the skull. The hourglass represents the finite space of time that is a man's life. Viewing these symbols together leads to the thought of man's mortality, and the method by which to save the immortal soul.

== See also ==
- List of engravings by Albrecht Dürer
- List of woodcuts by Albrecht Dürer

== Sources ==
- Puttfarken, Thomas (2000). The Discovery of Pictorial Composition: Theories of Visual Order in Painting 1400–1800. New Haven & London: Yale University Press. ISBN 0-300-08156-1.
- Courtney, Jennifer. Sanford, Courtney (2018). Marvelous To Behold. Classical Conversations, Inc.
