= Handbook of the Christian Knight =

1503 book by Erasmus of Rotterdam

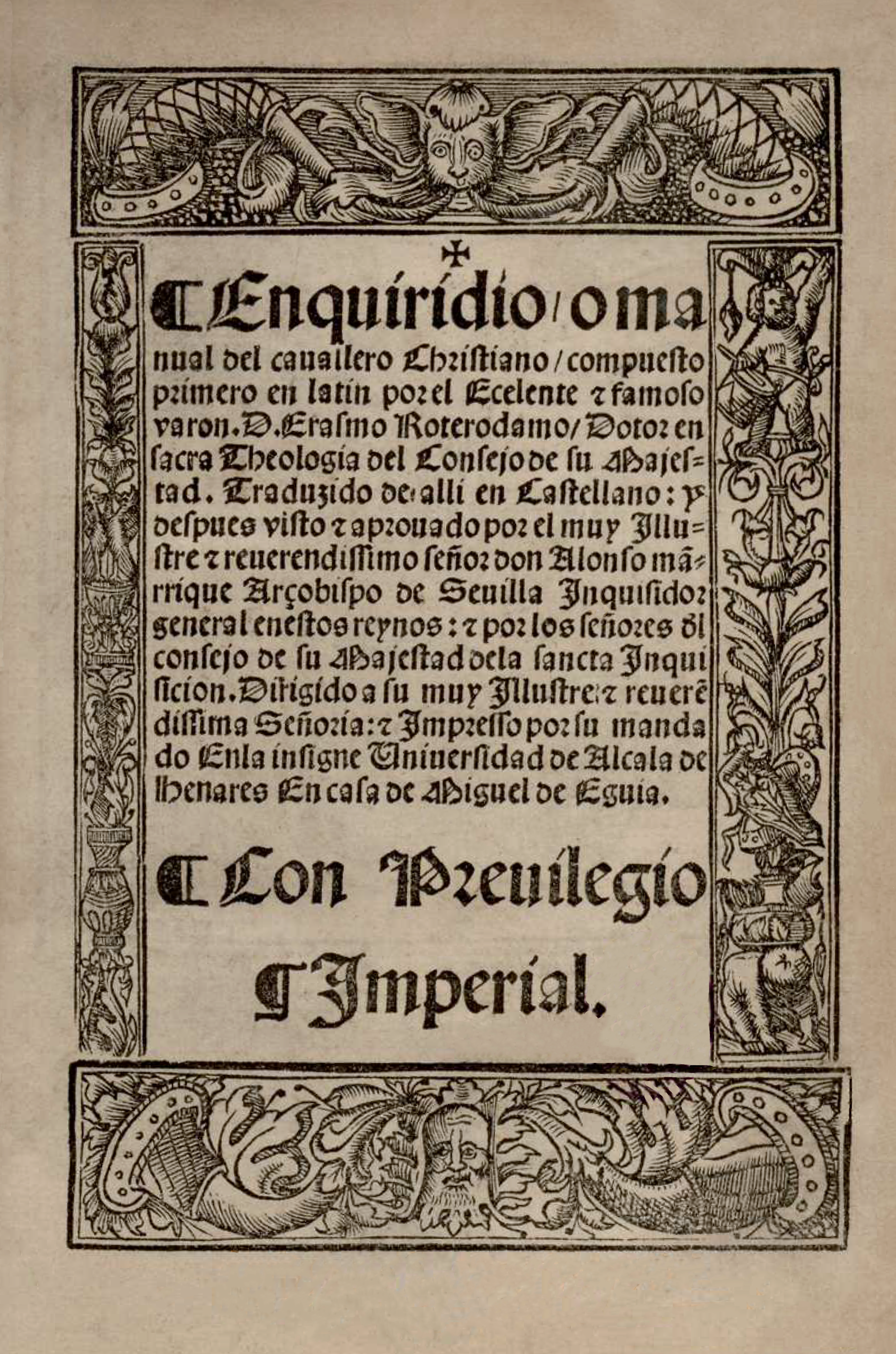
Handbook of a Christian Knight

The Handbook of the Christian Knight (Latin: Enchiridion militis Christiani), sometimes translated as The Manual of the Christian Knight or The Handbook of the Christian Soldier or just the Enchiridion, is a work written by Dutch scholar Erasmus of Rotterdam in 1501. It was first published in English in 1533 in a translation by William Tyndale; in 1545 Miles Coverdale published an abridged translation.

During a stay in Tournehem, a castle near Saint-Omer in the north of modern-day France, Erasmus encountered an uncivilized, yet friendly soldier who was an acquaintance of Jacob Batt, Erasmus' close friend. On the request of the soldier's pious wife, who felt slighted by her husband's behaviour, Battus asked Erasmus to write a text which would convince the soldier of the necessity of mending his ways, which Erasmus did. The resulting work was eventually re-drafted by Erasmus and expanded into the Enchiridion militis Christiani. The Enchiridion is an appeal on Christians to act in accordance with the Christian faith rather than merely performing the necessary rites. It became one of Erasmus' most influential works.

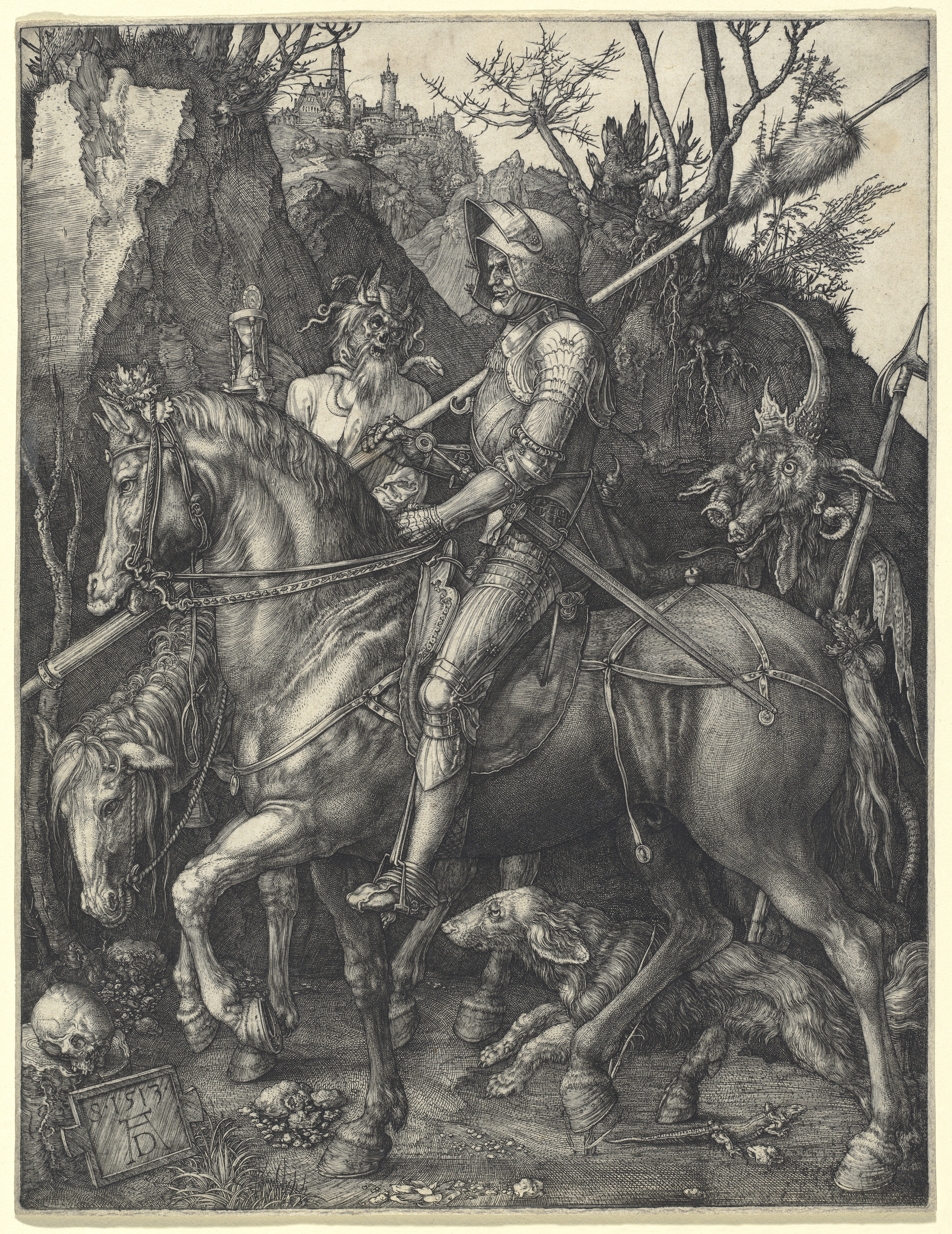
Albrecht Dürer's Knight, Death and the Devil, 1513, engraving, 24.5 x 19.1 cm

Enchiridion makes reference to the Pauline "spiritual armor" metaphor of Ephesians 6, which in the 16th century only gained in popularity as a result of Erasmus' work.

Scholars believe that in Albrecht Dürer's famous artwork Knight, Death, and Devil, the image of the knight (shown dressed in armor) can be interpreted from an Erasmian viewpoint to represent the knight who is able to vanquish his enemies by ignoring them "in his pursuit of Christian virtue".
