= Saint Sebastian at the Column (Dürer) =

Engraving by Albrecht Dürer

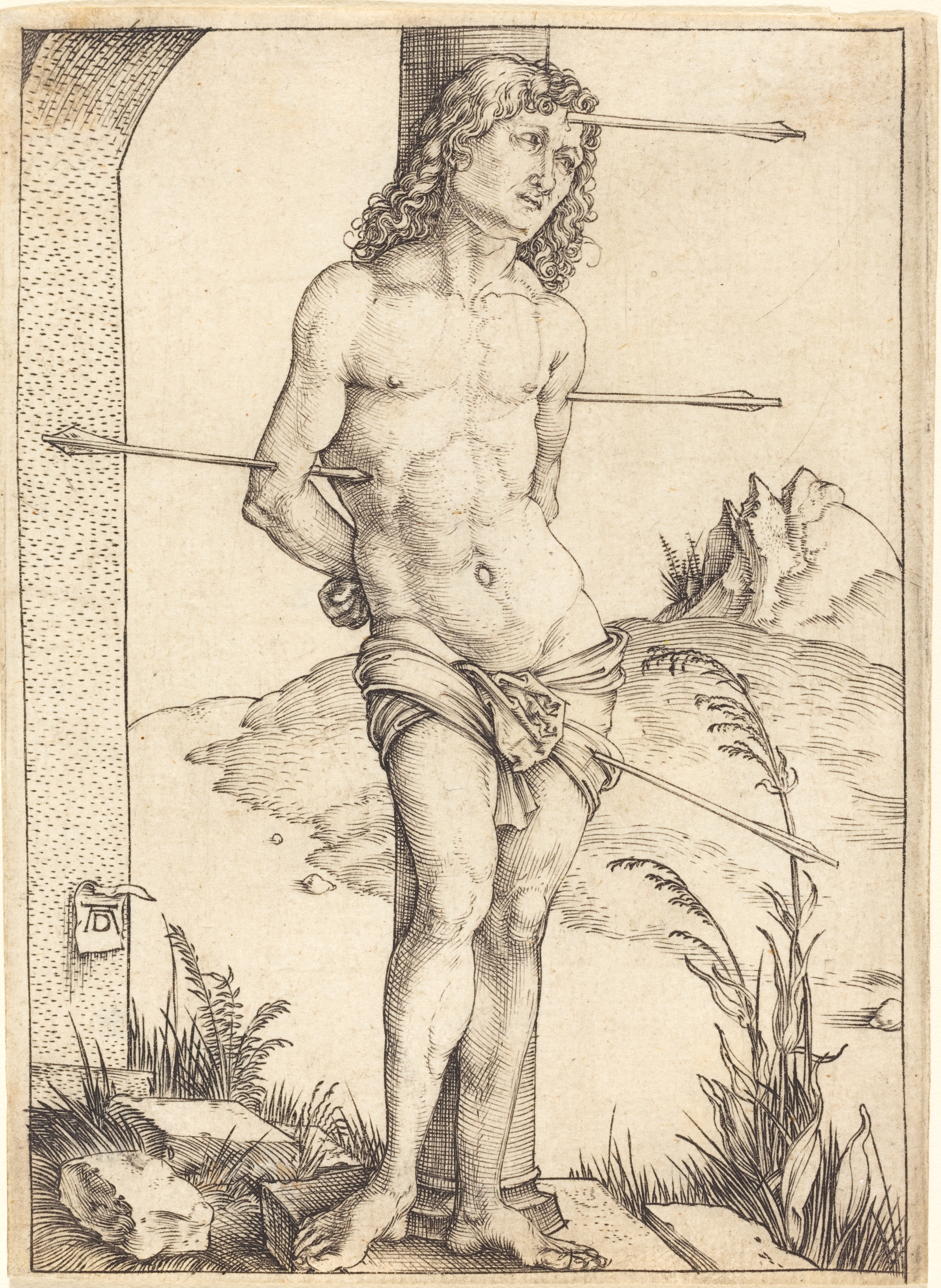
Saint Sebastian at the Column, by Albrecht Dürer.

Saint Sebastian at the Column is a 1500 copper engraving by the German artist Albrecht Dürer (1471–1528), part of his series of the Lives of the Saints.

Dürer intended the work to represent both an idealised vision of 15th-century beauty, and a homage to classical sculpture. According to legend, Saint Sebastian was martyred by the Roman emperor Diocletian for his Christian faith. By the 16th century, artists were using Christian tales as an excuse to portray the humanistic nude body. The four arrows piercing Sebastian's body represent a symbolic wounding of a flawless body. The saint's pose echoes the Crucifixion, and like the saviour, Saint Sebastian is said to have risen from the dead, though in his case to punish those who persecuted Christians for their beliefs.

The engraving is an early example of contrapposto in Western art, and one of the first depictions of the harmonious balance between opposing forces (in this case between the arrows and the flesh). Dürer encountered such concepts during his travels to north Italy, where he also found the inspiration for the harmonious contrast he renders between Saint Sebastian's engaged leg and his free leg.

== See also ==
- List of engravings by Albrecht Dürer
- List of woodcuts by Albrecht Dürer
- St. Sebastian (Mantegna)

== Sources ==
- Nürnberg, Verlag Hans Carl. Dürer in Dublin: Engravings and woodcuts of Albrecht Dürer. Chester Beatty Library, 1983.
- Kurth, Dr. Willi. The complete woodcuts of Albrecht Durer. New York: Arden Book Co, 1935.
