= Ursula Meyer =

German-American artist

- Born: 1915; Hanover, Germany
- Died: 2003 (aged 87–88)
- Education: Reggia Scuola, Faenza, Italy
- Known for: Sculpture

Ursula Meyer (1915–2003) was a German-born American artist and a professor of sculpture.

== Biography ==
Ursula Meyer was born in Hanover, Germany in 1915. She studied ceramics at the Reggia Scuola in Faenza, Italy. Meyer became a professor of sculpture at the City University of New York in New York City in 1963, and she would remain at CUNY's Lehman College until her retirement in 1980. She wrote a number of articles and reviews in newspapers and art magazines in the United States. Her perspective on minimalist art was one of many recognized voices in the art world of the 1960s. Meyer authored the book Conceptual Art published by E.P. Dutton in 1972. After her death, she received a retrospective exhibit at the Art Gallery of The Graduate Center of The City University of New York.

Meyer's sculpture has been described as focused on the interplay of transiency and stability, flexible and transcendent of size and shape, and deeply aware of the historical and political dimensions of the monumental.

== Exhibitions ==
=== Solo exhibitions ===
- Sculpture, Amel Gallery New York, New York (1964)
- Dedalus 8, A.M. Sachs Gallery, New York, New York (1968)
- Ursula Meyer, Hunter College Art Gallery, New York (1968)
- Ursula Meyer, Herbert H. Lehman College Art Gallery, Lehman College, Bronx, New York (1971)
- Ursula Meyer, Graduate Center, CUNY, New York, New York (1974)

=== Selected group exhibitions ===
- Artist-Craftsmen of New York, Cooper Union Museum, New York, New York (1963, 1964, 1965)
- National Design Center, New York, New York (1964, 1965)
- Artists for CORE (1967)
- Artists for SEDF (1967)
- Cool Art of 1967, Aldrich Contemporary Art Museum, Ridgefield, Connecticut
- Cool Art – Abstraction Today, Newark Museum, Newark, New Jersey (1967)
- Listening to Pictures, Brooklyn Museum, Brooklyn, New York (1967)
- Outdoor Sculpture, Hunter College, New York, New York (Bronx Council on the Arts) (1967)
- Schemata 7, Finch College Museum of Art, New York, New York (1967)
- Penthouse Gallery, Museum of Modern Art, New York, New York (1967)
- Riverside Museum, New York, New York (1967)
- Guild Hall Museum, East Hampton, New York (1967)
- The Variable Module, Architectural Art, Washington, D.C. (1968)
- Highlights of the 1967–1968 Season, Aldrich Contemporary Art Museum, Ridgefield, Connecticut (1969)
- Gallery 9, Chatham, New Jersey (1969)
- Artist-Craftsmen of New York, Hudson River Museum, Yonkers, New York (1969)
- 9 from CUNY, Galerie Simone Stern, New Orleans, Louisiana (1969)
- Hunter College, New York, New York (1969)
- Two Person Show: Ursula Meyer & Gio Pomodoro, Galerie S. Stern, New Orleans, Louisiana (1970)
- Hawthorn Gallery, Skidmore College, Saratoga Springs, New York (1970)
- Projected Art/Artist at Work, Finch College Museum of Art, New York, New York (1970)
- Museum, Albany State Museum, Cornell University Museum, Skidmore College Hawthorn Gallery (1970)
- National Arts Club, New York, New York (1970)
- The Flag Show, Judson Memorial Church, New York, New York (1970)
- Open Show, Women's Interart Center, New York, New York (1971)
- Collage of Indignation II, Hundred Acres Gallery, New York, New York (1971)
- Sculpture in the Park, Van Saun Park, Paramus, New Jersey (New Jersey State Council on the Arts) (1971)
- Feminist Art, MUSEUM, New York, New York (1971)
- Faculty Show, Lehman College Gallery, Bronx, New York (1971)
- Eight Alumni Artists, Columbia University, New York, New York (1974)
- From Teapot Dome to Watergate, Everson Museum, Syracuse, New York (1974)
- Faculty Drawings, Lehman College Gallery, Bronx, New York (1974)
- Selections from the Permanent Collection, Finch College Museum of Art, New York, New York (1974)
- Drawings, Fordham University Lowenstein Gallery, New York, New York (1974)
- Annual Invitational Show, Noho Gallery, New York, New York (1974)
- Art & Time, Lehman College Gallery, Bronx, New York (1974)
- CAPS Sculptors, City Gallery, New York, New York (1983)
- Distinguished Alumni Exhibition, Columbia University, New York, New York (1990)

=== Special exhibitions, permanent installations ===
- Brussels Worlds Fair: group of vases (1958)
- Computer Center, CUNY: sculpture (1974–80)
- Graduate Center, CUNY: several sculptures (1974–80)
- Graduate Center, CUNY: sculpture installation (1989)
