= Melencolia I =

1514 engraving by Albrecht Dürer

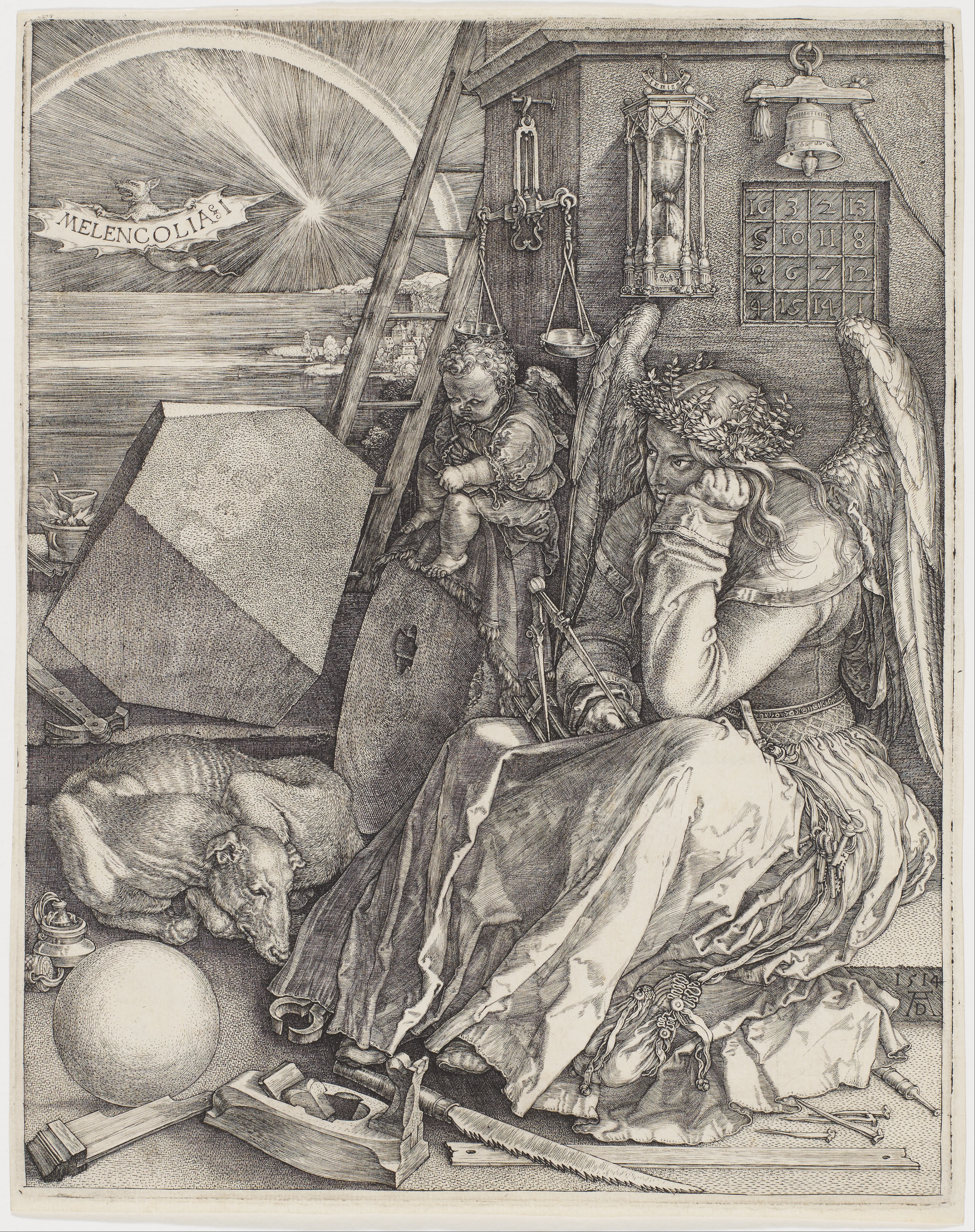
- Melencolia I (with annotations)
- Artist: Albrecht Dürer
- Year: 1514
- Type: engraving
- Dimensions: 24 cm × 18.8 cm (9.4 in × 7.4 in)

Melencolia I is a large 1514 engraving by the German Renaissance artist Albrecht Dürer. Its central subject is a brooding, winged female figure generally interpreted to represent a personification of melancholia. The area within the frame is strewn with symbols and tools associated with craft and carpentry, including an hourglass, weighing scales, a hand plane, a claw hammer, and a saw. Other objects relate to alchemy, geometry or numerology. Behind the figure is a structure with an embedded magic square, and a ladder leading beyond the frame. The sky contains a rainbow, a comet or planet, and a bat-like creature bearing the text that has become the print's title.

Dürer's engraving is one of the most well-known extant old master prints, but, despite a vast art-historical literature, it has resisted any definitive interpretation. Dürer may have associated melancholia with creative activity; the woman may be a representation of a Muse, awaiting inspiration but fearful that it will not return. As such, Dürer may have intended the print as a veiled self-portrait. Other art historians see the figure as pondering the nature of beauty or the value of artistic creativity in light of rationalism, or as a purposely obscure work that highlights the limitations of allegorical or symbolic art.

The art historian Erwin Panofsky, whose writing on the print has received the most attention, detailed its possible relation to Renaissance humanists' conception of melancholia. Summarizing its art-historical legacy, he wrote that "the influence of Dürer's Melencolia I—the first representation in which the concept of melancholy was transplanted from the plane of scientific and pseudo-scientific folklore to the level of art—extended all over the European continent and lasted for more than three centuries."

== Context ==
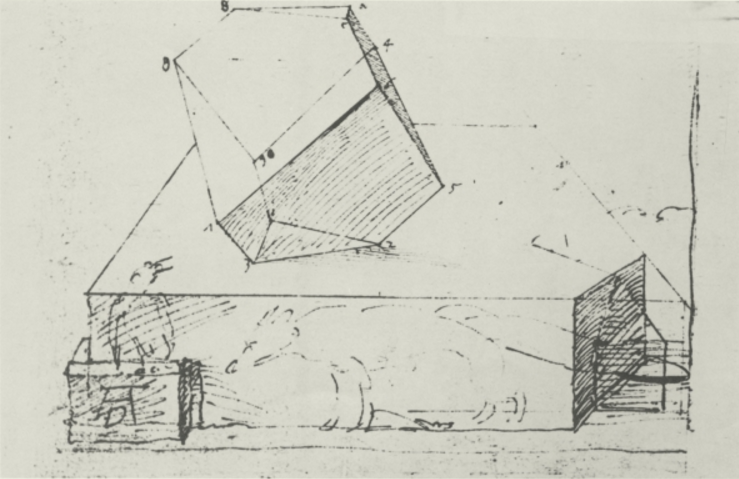
A preparatory sketch for the engraving; see also this sketch.

The art historian Campbell Dodgson wrote in 1926 that "The literature on Melancholia is more extensive than that on any other engraving by Dürer: that statement would probably remain true if the last two words were omitted." Panofsky's studies in German and English, between 1923 and 1964 and sometimes with coauthors, have been especially influential. Melencolia I is one of Dürer's three Meisterstiche ("master prints"), along with Knight, Death and the Devil (1513) and St. Jerome in His Study (1514). The prints are considered thematically related by some art historians, depicting labours that are intellectual (Melencolia I), moral (Knight), or spiritual (St. Jerome) in nature. While Dürer sometimes distributed Melencolia I with St. Jerome in His Study, there is no evidence that he conceived of them as a thematic group. The print has two states; in the first, the number nine in the magic square appears backward, but in the second, more common impressions it is a somewhat odd-looking regular nine.

There is little documentation to provide insight into Dürer's intent. He made a few pencil studies for the engraving and some of his notes relate to it. A commonly quoted note refers to the keys and the purse—"Schlüssel—gewalt/pewtell—reichtum beteut" ("keys mean power, purse means wealth")—although this can be read as a simple record of their traditional symbolism. Another note reflects on the nature of beauty. In 1513 and 1514, Dürer experienced the death of a number of friends, followed by his mother (whose portrait he drew in this period), engendering a grief that may be expressed in this engraving. Dürer mentions melancholy only once in his surviving writings. In an unfinished book for young artists, he cautions that too much exertion may lead one to "fall under the hand of melancholy".

Panofsky considered but rejected the suggestion that the "I" in the title might indicate that Dürer had planned three other engravings on the four temperaments. He suggested instead that the "I" referred to the first of three types of melancholy defined by Cornelius Agrippa (see Interpretation). Others see the "I" as a reference to nigredo, the first stage of the alchemical process.

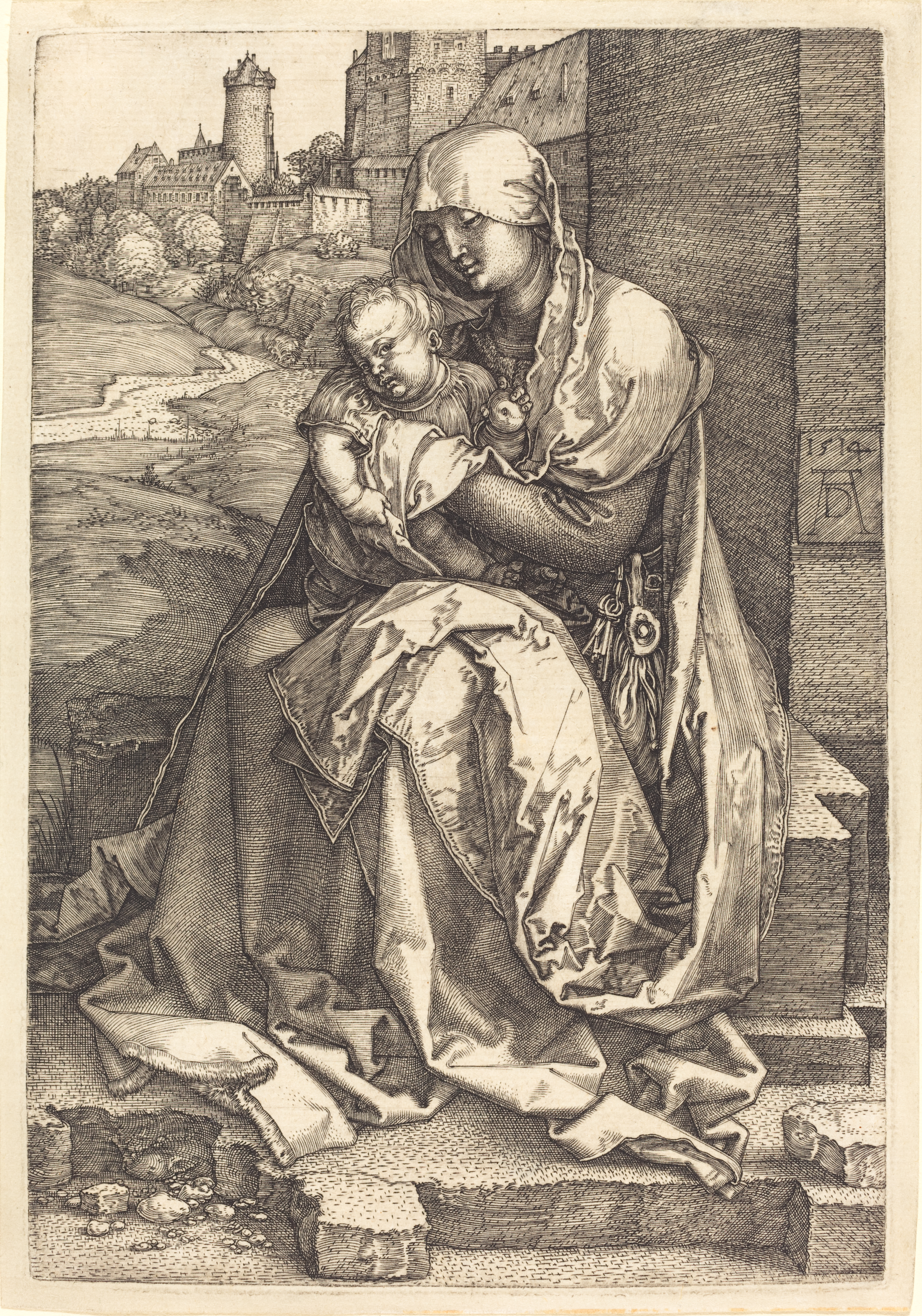
Dürer's Virgin and Child Seated by a Wall (1514) is compositionally similar to Melencolia I in the position of the figures and structures, but is much more coherent to the eye. This comparison highlights the disturbing function of the polyhedron in Melencolia I.

== Description ==
The winged, central figure is often interpreted as a personification of either melancholia or geometry. She sits on a slab with a closed book on her lap, holds a compass loosely, and gazes intensely into the distance. Seemingly immobilized by gloom, she pays no attention to the many objects around her. Reflecting the medieval iconographical depiction of melancholy, she rests her head on a closed fist. Her face is relatively dark, indicating the accumulation of black bile, and she wears a wreath of watery plants (water parsley and watercress or lovage). A set of keys and a purse hang from the belt of her long dress. Behind her, a windowless building with no clear architectural function rises beyond the top of the frame. A ladder with seven rungs leans against the structure, but neither its beginning nor end is visible. A putto sits atop a millstone (or grindstone) with a chip in it. He scribbles on a tablet, or perhaps a burin used for engraving; he is generally the only active element of the picture. Attached to the structure is a balance scale above the putto, and above Melancholy is a bell and an hourglass with a sundial at the top. Numerous unused tools and mathematical instruments are scattered around, including a hammer and nails, a saw, a plane, pincers, a straightedge, a molder's form, and either the nozzle of a bellows or an enema syringe (clyster). On the low wall behind the large polyhedron is a brazier with a goldsmith's crucible and a pair of tongs. To the left of the emaciated, sleeping dog is a censer, or an inkwell with a strap connecting a pen holder.

A bat-like creature spreads its wings across the sky, revealing a banner printed with the words "Melencolia I". Beyond it is a rainbow and an object which is either Saturn or a comet. In the far distance is a landscape with small treed islands, suggesting flooding, and a sea. The rightmost portion of the background may show a large wave crashing over land. Panofsky believes that it is night, citing the "cast-shadow" of the hourglass on the building, with the moon lighting the scene and creating a lunar rainbow.

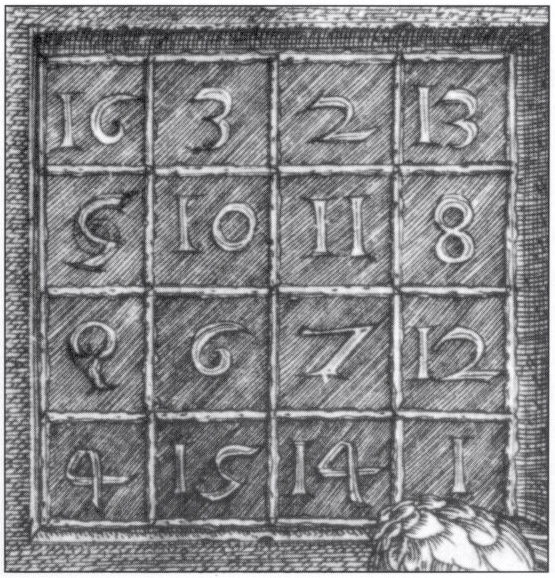
A 4×4 magic square has columns, rows, and diagonals that sum to 34. In this configuration, many other sets of four squares also sum to 34. Dürer includes the year in the two bottom squares, and the squares adding to 5 and 17 may refer to his mother's death in May of that year. (First number of second row is "5" and third row "9").

The print contains numerous references to mathematics and geometry. In front of the dog lies a perfect sphere, which has a radius equal to the apparent distance marked by the figure's compass. On the face of the building is a 4×4 magic square—the first printed in Europe—with the two middle cells of the bottom row giving the date of the engraving, 1514, which is also seen above Dürer's monogram at bottom right. The square follows the traditional rules of magic squares: each of its rows, columns, and diagonals adds to the same number, 34. It is also associative, meaning that any number added to its symmetric opposite equals 17 (e.g., 15+2, 9+8). Additionally, the corners and each quadrant sum to 34, as do still more combinations. Dürer's mother died on May 17, 1514; some interpreters connect the digits of this date with the sets of two squares that sum to 5 and 17. The unusual solid that dominates the left half of the image is a truncated rhombohedron with what may be a faint skull or face, possibly even of Dürer. This shape is now known as Dürer's solid, and over the years, there have been numerous analyses of its mathematical properties.

In contrast with Saint Jerome in His Study, which has a strong sense of linear perspective and an obvious source of light, Melencolia I is disorderly and lacks a "visual center". It has few perspective lines leading to the vanishing point (below the bat-like creature at the horizon), which divides the diameter of the rainbow in the golden ratio. The work otherwise scarcely has any strong lines. The unusual polyhedron destabilizes the image by blocking some of the view into the distance and sending the eye in different directions. There is little tonal contrast and, despite its stillness, a sense of chaos, a "negation of order", is noted by many art historians. The mysterious light source at right, which illuminates the image, is unusually placed for Dürer and contributes to the "airless, dreamlike space".

== Interpretations ==
Dürer's friend and first biographer Joachim Camerarius wrote the earliest account of the engraving in 1541. Addressing its apparent symbolism, he said, "to show that such [afflicted] minds commonly grasp everything and how they are frequently carried away into absurdities, [Dürer] reared up in front of her a ladder into the clouds, while the ascent by means of rungs is ... impeded by a square block of stone." Later, the 16th-century art historian Giorgio Vasari described Melencolia I as a technical achievement that "puts the whole world in awe".

Most art historians view the print as an allegory, assuming that a unified theme can be found in the image if its constituent symbols are "unlocked" and brought into conceptual order. This sort of interpretation assumes that the print is a Vexierbild (a "puzzle image") or rebus whose ambiguities are resolvable. Others see the ambiguity as intentional and unresolvable. Merback notes that ambiguities remain even after the interpretation of numerous individual symbols: the viewer does not know if it is daytime or twilight, where the figures are located, or the source of illumination. The ladder leaning against the structure has no obvious beginning or end, and the structure overall has no obvious function. The bat may be flying from the scene, or is perhaps some sort of daemon related to the traditional conception of melancholia.

Certain relationships in humorism, astrology, and alchemy are important for understanding the interpretive history of the print. Since the ancient Greeks, the health and temperament of an individual were thought to be determined by the four humors: black bile (melancholic humor), yellow bile (choleric), phlegm (phlegmatic), and blood (sanguine). In astrology, each temperament was under the influence of a planet, Saturn in the case of melancholia. Each temperament was also associated with one of the four elements; melancholia was paired with Earth, and was considered "dry and cold" in alchemy. Melancholia was traditionally the least desirable of the four temperaments, making for a constitution that was, according to Panofsky, "awkward, miserly, spiteful, greedy, malicious, cowardly, faithless, irreverent and drowsy".

In 1905, Heinrich Wölfflin called the print an "allegory of deep, speculative thought". A few years earlier, the Viennese art historian Karl Giehlow had published two articles that laid the groundwork for Panofsky's extensive study of the print. Giehlow specialized in the German humanist interest in hieroglyphics and interpreted Melencolia I in terms of astrology, which had been an interest of intellectuals connected to the court of Maximilian in Vienna. Giehlow found the print an "erudite summa of these interests, a comprehensive portrayal of the melancholic temperament, its positive and negative values held in perfect balance, its potential for 'genius' suspended between divine inspiration and dark madness".

=== Iconography ===
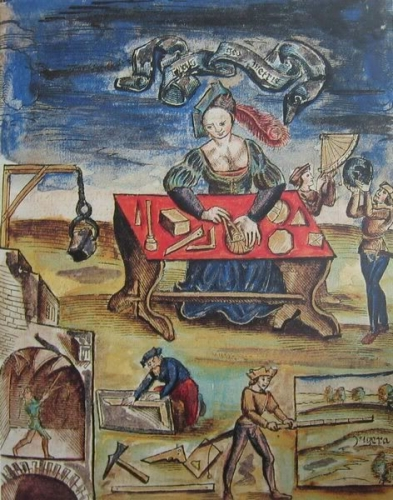
An earlier woodcut with an allegory of geometry from Gregor Reisch's Margarita philosophica. It depicts many objects also seen in Melencolia I.

According to Panofsky, who wrote about the print three times between 1923 and 1964, Melencolia I combines the traditional iconographies of melancholy and geometry, both governed by Saturn. Geometry was one of the Seven Liberal Arts and its mastery was considered vital to the creation of high art, which had been revolutionised by new understandings of perspective. In the engraving, symbols of geometry, measurement, and trades are numerous: the compass, the scale, the hammer and nails, the plane and saw, the sphere and the unusual polyhedron. Panofsky examined earlier personifications of geometry and found much similarity between Dürer's engraving and an allegory of geometry from Gregor Reisch's Margarita philosophica (1503), a popular encyclopedia.

Other aspects of the print reflect the traditional symbolism of melancholy, such as the bat, emaciated dog, purse and keys. The figure wears a wreath of "wet" plants to counteract the dryness of melancholy, and she has the dark face and dishevelled appearance associated with the melancholic. The intensity of her gaze, however, suggests an intent to depart from traditional depictions of this temperament. The magic square is a talisman of Jupiter, an auspicious planet that fends off melancholy—different square sizes were associated with different planets, with the 4×4 square representing Jupiter. Even the distant seascape, with small islands of flooded trees, relates to Saturn, the "lord of the sea", and his control of floods and tides.

Panofsky believed that Dürer's understanding of melancholy was influenced by the writings of the German humanist Cornelius Agrippa, and before him Marsilio Ficino. Ficino thought that most intellectuals were influenced by Saturn and were thus melancholic. He equated melancholia with elevation of the intellect, since black bile "raises thought to the comprehension of the highest, because it corresponds to the highest of the planets". Before the Renaissance, melancholics were portrayed as embodying the vice of acedia, meaning spiritual sloth. Ficino and Agrippa's writing gave melancholia positive connotations, associating it with flights of genius. As art historian Philip Sohm summarizes, Ficino and Agrippa gave Renaissance intellectuals a "Neoplatonic conception of melancholy as divine inspiration ... Under the influence of Saturn, ... the melancholic imagination could be led to remarkable achievements in the arts".

Agrippa defined three types of melancholic genius in his De occulta philosophia. The first, melancholia imaginativa, affected artists, whose imaginative faculty was considered stronger than their reason (compared with, e.g., scientists) or intuitive mind (e.g., theologians). Dürer might have been referring to this first type of melancholia, the artist's, by the "I" in the title. Melancholia was thought to attract daemons that produced bouts of frenzy and ecstasy in the afflicted, lifting the mind toward genius. In Panofsky's summary, the imaginative melancholic, the subject of Dürer's print, "typifies the first, or least exalted, form of human ingenuity. She can invent and build, and she can think ... but she has no access to the metaphysical world ... [She] belongs in fact to those who 'cannot extend their thought beyond the limits of space.' Hers is the inertia of a being which renounces what it could reach because it cannot reach for what it longs." Dürer's personification of melancholia is of "a being to whom her allotted realm seems intolerably restricted—of a being whose thoughts 'have reached the limit'". Melencolia I portrays a state of lost inspiration: the figure is "surrounded by the instruments of creative work, but sadly brooding with a feeling that she is achieving nothing."

Autobiography runs through many of the interpretations of Melencolia I, including Panofsky's. Iván Fenyő considered the print a representation of an artist beset by a loss of confidence, saying: "shortly before [Dürer] drew Melancholy, he wrote: 'what is beautiful I do not know' ... Melancholy is a lyric confession, the self-conscious introspection of the Renaissance artist, unprecedented in northern art. Erwin Panofsky is right in considering this admirable plate the spiritual self-portrait of Dürer."

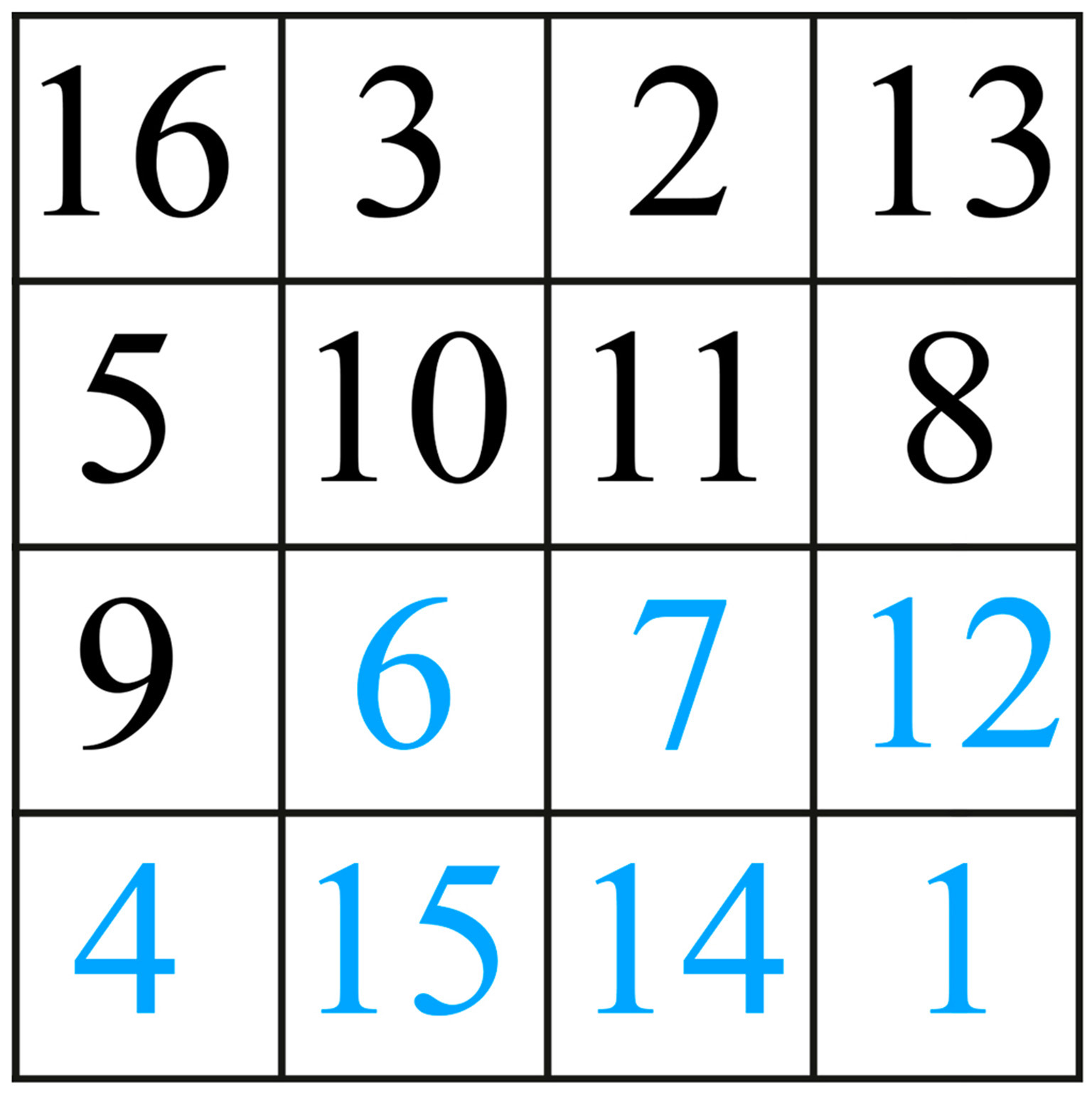
Quadrato magico "a Gjove"

Within the magic square of Melencolia § I, the combinations to be recognized are varied and surprising: «each corner group, formed by four squares (16, 3, 5, 10 - 2, 13, 11, 8 - 9, 6, 4, 15 – 7, 12, 14, 1), has the sum of 34. The same number is obtained by adding the digits of the central group (10, 11, 6, 7), but also those of the corner squares (16, 13, 4, 1). The same result is obtained by adding the digits on the horizontal, vertical, diagonal lines. We always get 34. In total, the number occurs sixteen times. Sixteen is the total number of enclosed squares. This is a property that also appears in Henricus Cornelius Agrippa von Nettesheim's Tabula Jovis, but which has gone unnoticed by many, perhaps because it does not appear in the list of its characteristics, drawn up by the author himself. The characteristic of the sums of each zone is also shared in the analogous schemes of Mescupolo and Paracelsus. Despite the similarity with these, the magic square of Melencolia § I does not seem chosen to follow a hermetic tradition. The unspoken exclusivity of this type of square may be the reason for the dedication to Jupiter (privileged among the gods and the greatest of the planets) and for Dürer's choice. In truth, its most reliable source is found in the description that Luca Pacioli proposes as a pleasant curiosity [«ligiadro solazo» (f. 122r)], attributing its origin to the greatest astronomers, "Ptolomeo al humasar ali, al fragano, Geber and to all the others ". These "have dedicated to Jupiter [planet «Giove»] the figure made up of 4 squares on each side, with the numbers arranged in such a way as to obtain 34 for each direction, that is 16, 3, 2, 13 and in the following line 5, 10, 11, 8, therefore in the third line 9 [etc.] as seen in the margin."» Since this indicated scheme does not appear in the manuscript, it has been completed with blue digits (see image). The magic square of Melencolia § I represents a jovial exercise (lat. iovialis, from Iovis) to counter the influences of melancholy. In the lower center, the union of the numbers 15 and 14 indicates a very sad year.

=== Beyond allegory ===
In 1991, Peter-Klaus Schuster published Melencolia I: Dürers Denkbild, an exhaustive history of the print's interpretation in two volumes. His analysis, that Melencolia I is an "elaborately wrought allegory of virtue ... structured through an almost diagrammatic opposition of virtue and fortune", arrived as allegorical readings were coming into question. In the 1980s, scholars began to focus on the inherent contradictions of the print, finding a mismatch between "intention and result" in the interpretive effort it seemingly required. Martin Büchsel, in contrast to Panofsky, found the print a negation of Ficino's humanistic conception of melancholia. The chaos of the print lends itself to modern interpretations that find it a comment on the limitations of reason, the mind and senses, and philosophical optimism. For example, Dürer perhaps made the image impenetrable in order to simulate the experience of melancholia in the viewer.

Joseph Leo Koerner abandoned allegorical readings in his 1993 commentary, describing the engraving as purposely obscure, such that the viewer reflects on their own interpretive labour. He wrote, "The vast effort of subsequent interpreters, in all their industry and error, testifies to the efficacy of the print as an occasion for thought. Instead of mediating a meaning, Melencolia seems designed to generate multiple and contradictory readings, to clue its viewers to an endless exegetical labor until, exhausted in the end, they discover their own portrait in Dürer's sleepless, inactive personification of melancholy. Interpreting the engraving itself becomes a detour to self-reflection."

In 2004, Patrick Doorly argued that Dürer was more concerned with beauty than melancholy. Doorly found textual support for elements of Melencolia I in Plato's Hippias Major, a dialog about what constitutes the beautiful, and other works that Dürer would have read in conjunction with his belief that beauty and geometry, or measurement, were related. (Dürer wrote a treatise on human proportions, one of his last major accomplishments.) Dürer was exposed to a variety of literature that may have influenced the engraving by his friend and collaborator, the humanist Willibald Pirckheimer, who also translated from Greek. In Plato's dialog, Socrates and Hippias consider numerous definitions of the beautiful. They ask if that which is pleasant to sight and hearing is the beautiful, which Dürer symbolizes by the intense gaze of the figure, and the bell, respectively. The dialog then examines the notion that the "useful" is the beautiful, and Dürer wrote in his notes, "Usefulness is a part of beauty. Therefore what is useless in a man, is not beautiful." Doorly interprets the many useful tools in the engraving as symbolizing this idea; even the dog is a "useful" hunting hound. At one point the dialog refers to a millstone, an unusually specific object to appear in both sources by coincidence. Further, Dürer may have seen the perfect dodecahedron as representative of the beautiful (the "quintessence"), based on his understanding of Platonic solids. The "botched" polyhedron in the engraving therefore symbolises a failure to understand beauty, and the figure, standing in for the artist, is in a gloom as a result.

In Perfection's Therapy (2017), Merback argues that Dürer intended Melencolia I as a therapeutic image. He reviews the history of images of spiritual consolation in the Middle Ages and the Renaissance, and highlights how Dürer expressed his ethical and spiritual commitment to friends and community through his art. He writes, the "thematic of a virtue-building inner reflection, understood as an ethical-therapeutic imperative for the new type of pious intellectual envisioned by humanism, certainly underlies the conception of Melencolia". Dürer's friendships with humanists enlivened and advanced his artistic projects, building in him the "self-conception of an artist with the power to heal". Treatments for melancholia in ancient times and in the Renaissance occasionally recognized the value of "reasoned reflection and exhortation" and emphasized the regulation of melancholia rather than its elimination "so that it can better fulfill its God-given role as a material aid for the enhancement of human genius". The ambiguity of Melencolia I in this view "offers a moderate mental workout that calms rather than excites the passions, a stimulation of the soul's higher powers, an evacuative that dispels the vapors beclouding the mind... This, in a word, is a form of katharsis—not in the medical or religious sense of a 'purgation' of negative emotions, but a 'clarification' of the passions with both ethical and spiritual consequences".

== Legacy ==
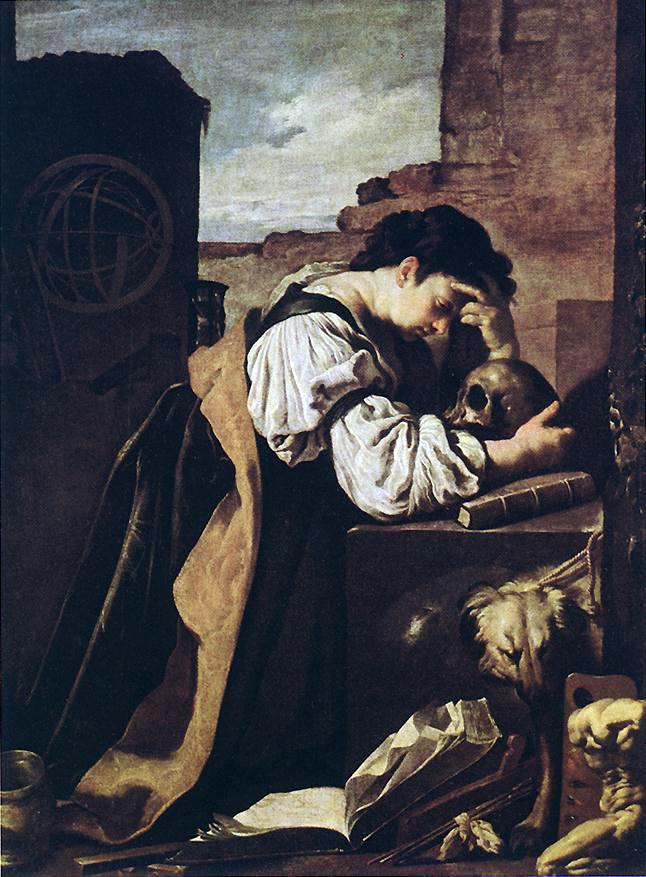
The figure in Domenico Fetti's Melancholy or Meditation (c. 1620) personifies Melancholy and Vanity.

Artists from the sixteenth century used Melencolia I as a source, either in single images personifying melancholia or in the older type in which all four temperaments appear. Lucas Cranach the Elder used its motifs in numerous paintings between 1528 and 1533. They share elements with Melencolia I such as a winged, seated woman, a sleeping or sitting dog, a sphere, and varying numbers of children playing, likely based on Durer's Putto. Cranach's paintings, however, contrast melancholy with childish gaiety, and in the 1528 painting, occult elements appear. Prints by Hans Sebald Beham (1539) and Jost Amman (1589) are clearly related. In the Baroque period, representations of Melancholy and Vanity were combined. Domenico Fetti's Melancholy/Meditation (c. 1620) is an important example; Panofsky et al. wrote that "the meaning of this picture is obvious at first glance; all human activity, practical no less than theoretical, theoretical no less than artistic, is vain, in view of the vanity of all earthly things."

The print attracted nineteenth-century Romantic artists; self-portrait drawings by Henry Fuseli and Caspar David Friedrich show their interest in capturing the mood of the Melencolia figure, as does Friedrich's The Woman with the Spider's Web.

The Renaissance historian Frances Yates believed George Chapman's 1594 poem The Shadow of Night to be influenced by Dürer's print, and Robert Burton described it in his The Anatomy of Melancholy (1621). Dürer's Melencolia is the patroness of the City of Dreadful Night in the final canto of James Thomson's poem of that name. The print was taken up in Romantic poetry of the nineteenth century in English and French.

The Passion façade of the Sagrada Família contains a magic square based on the magic square in Melencolia I. The square is rotated and one number in each row and column is reduced by one so the rows and columns add up to 33 instead of the standard 34 for a 4x4 magic square.

Lisbon Metro station Parque displays in one of its decorative azulejos a direct reference.

Thomas Mann suggested the engraving in Doctor Faustus "Above it, fixed to the wall with drawing pins, was an arithmetical engraving which he had unearthed in some antique shop: a ‘magic square’, such as appears in Dürer’s Melencholia, alongside the hourglass, the compasses, the scales, the polyhedron, and other symbols."

Works influenced by Melencolia&nbsp;I

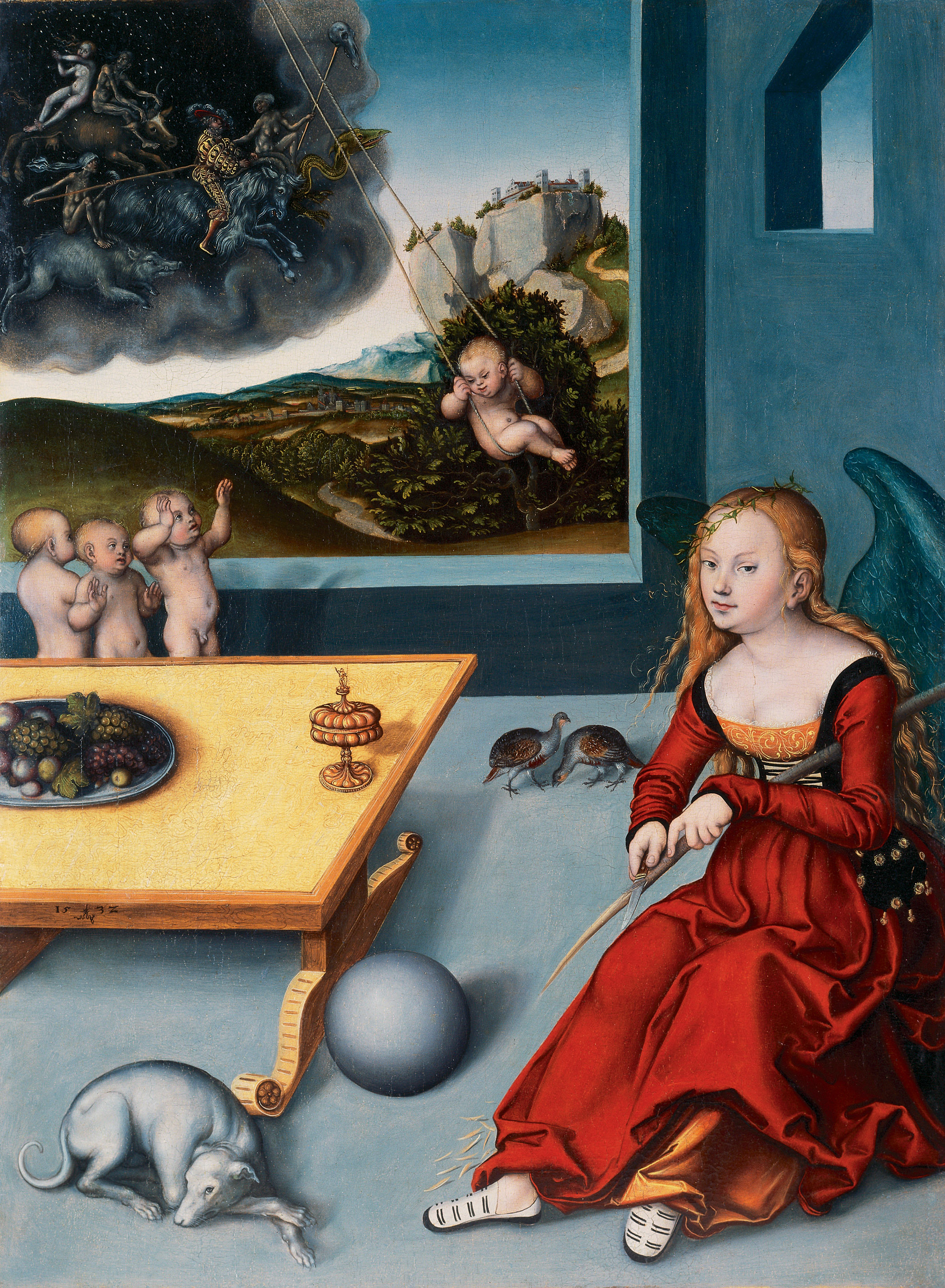
Lucas Cranach the Elder's 1532 painting Melancholia (Colmar version)

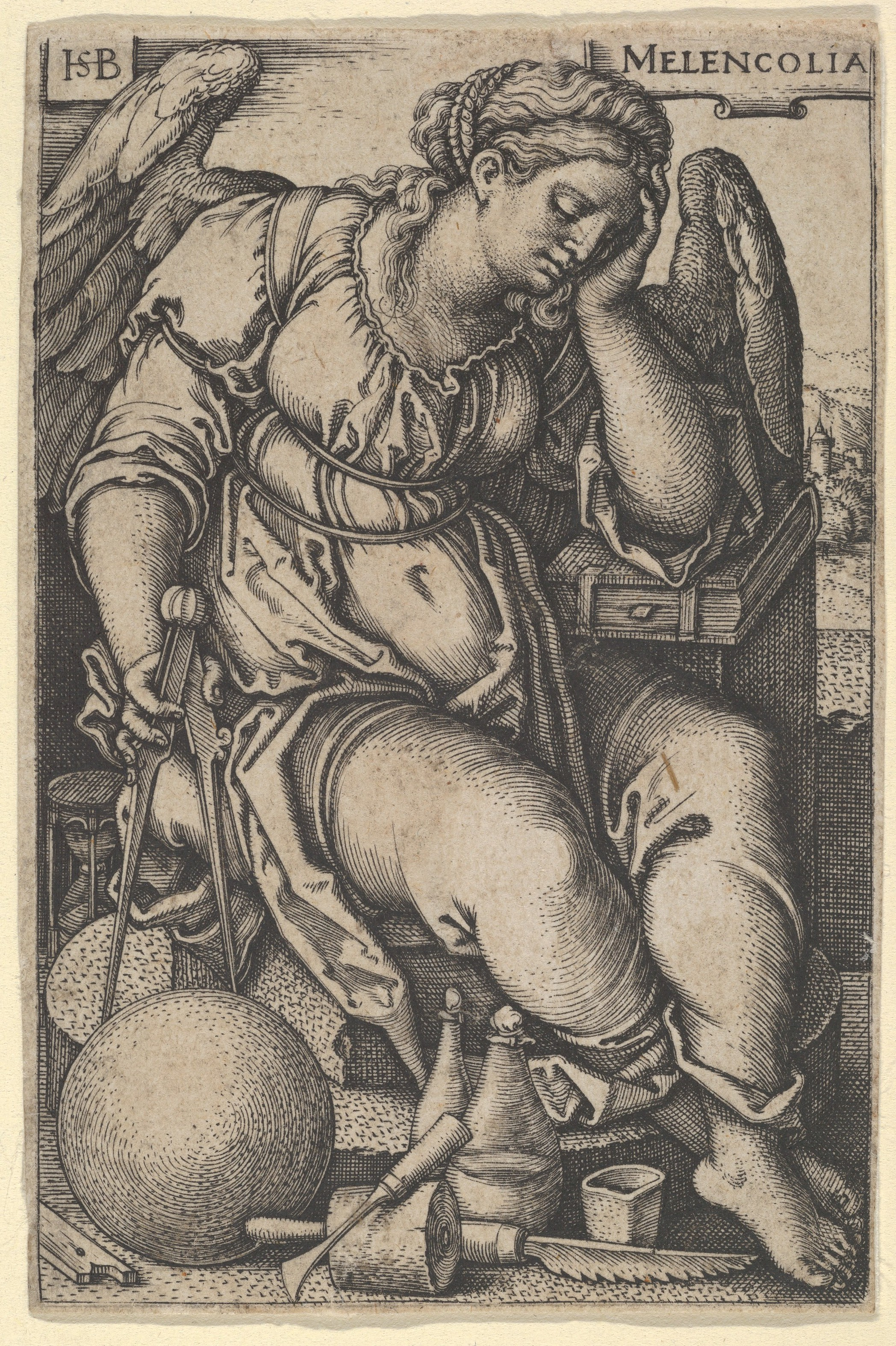
Hans Sebald Beham's Melancholia (1539)

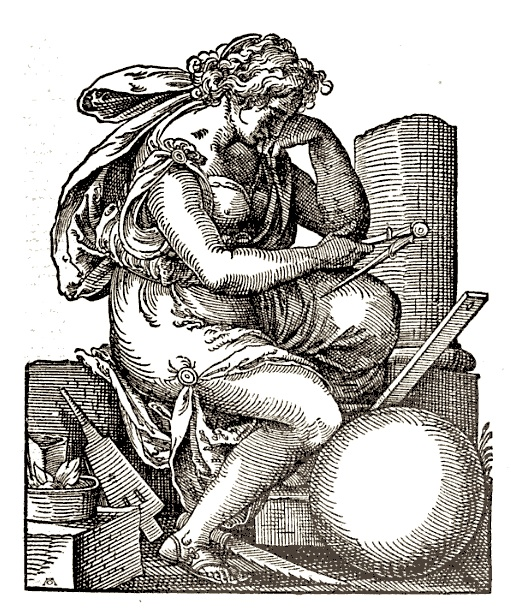
Jost Amman's Melancholia (1589)

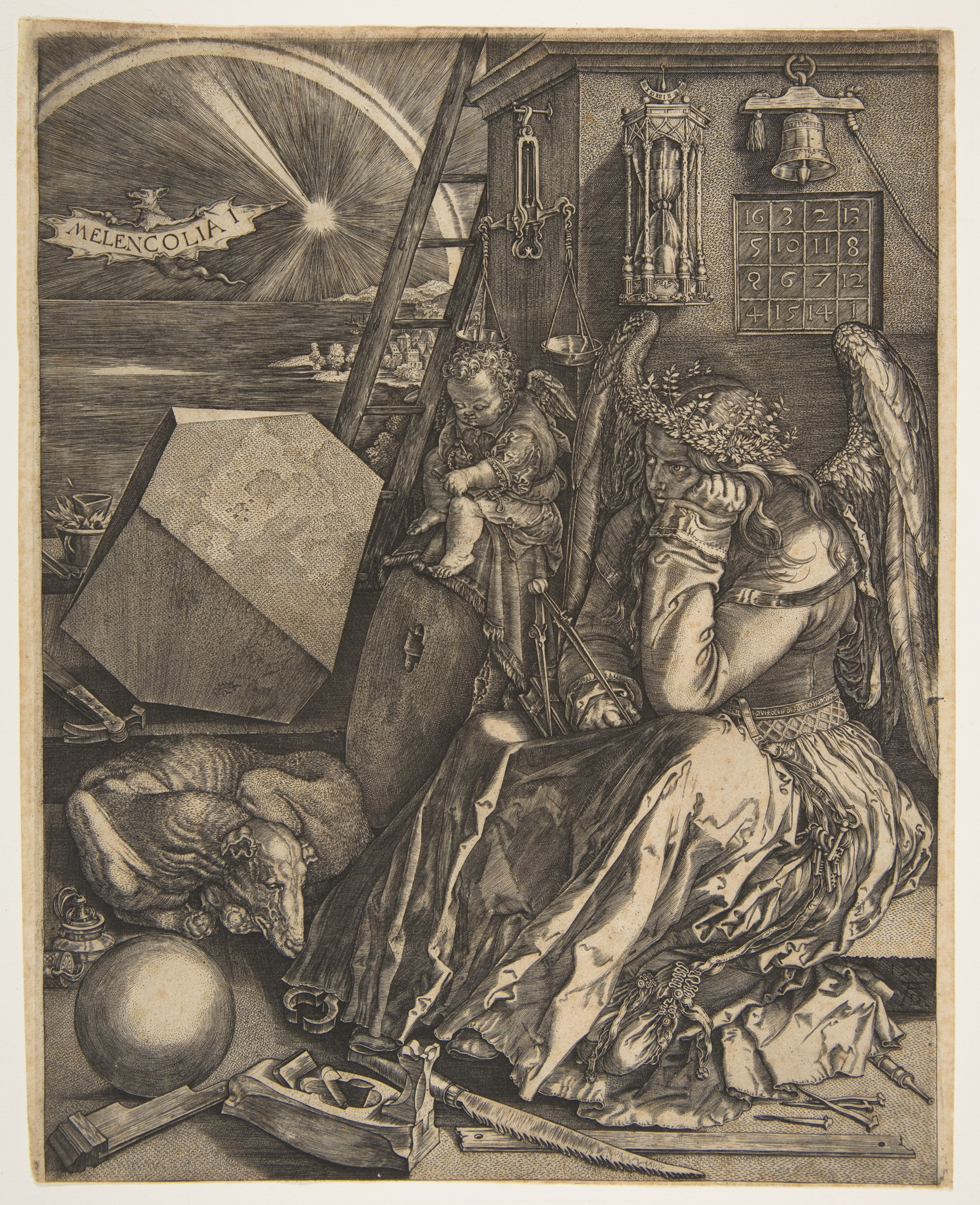
Jan Wierix's 1602 copy

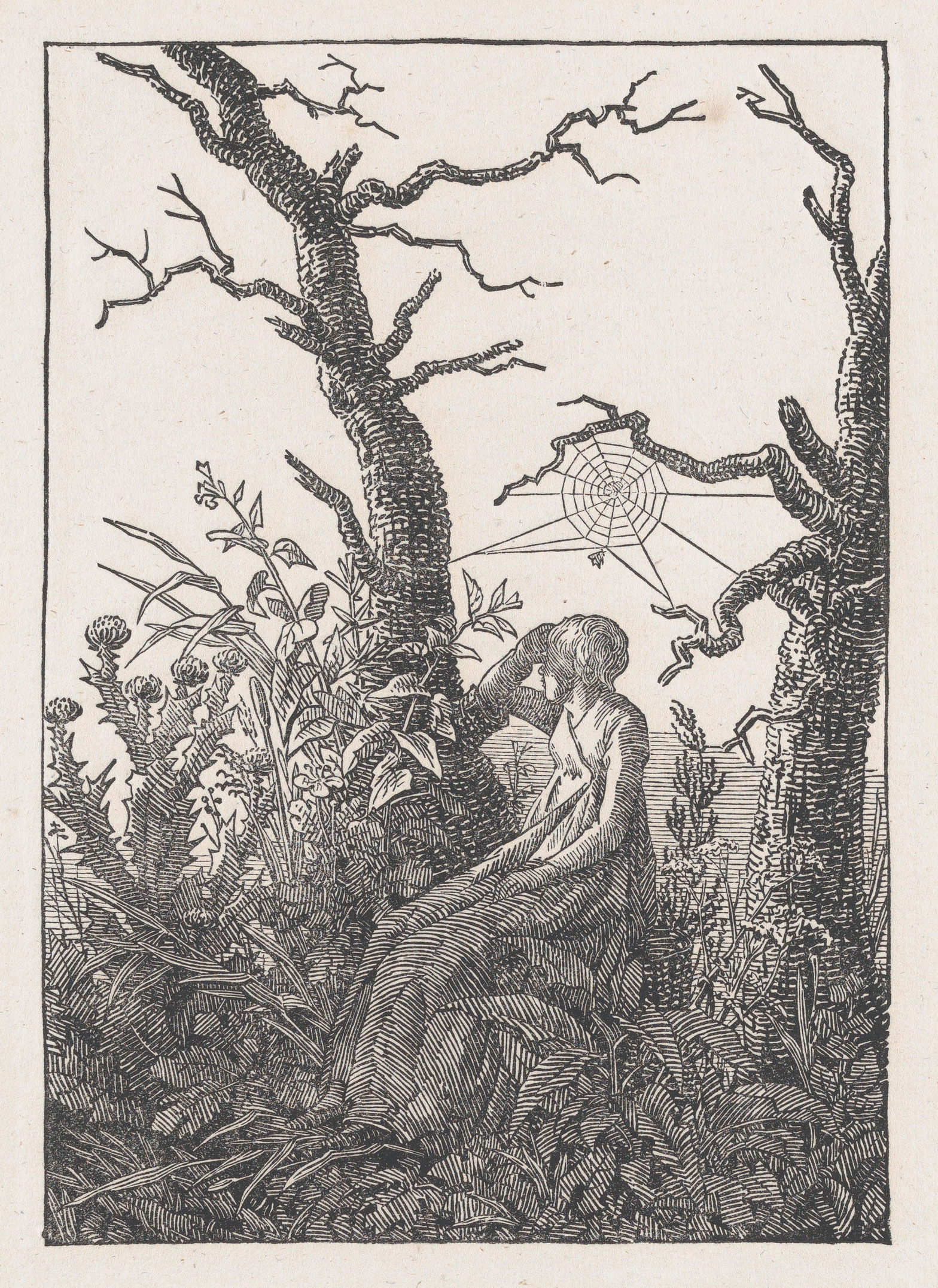
The Woman with the Spider's Web or Melancholy. Woodcut after an 1803 drawing by Caspar David Friedrich

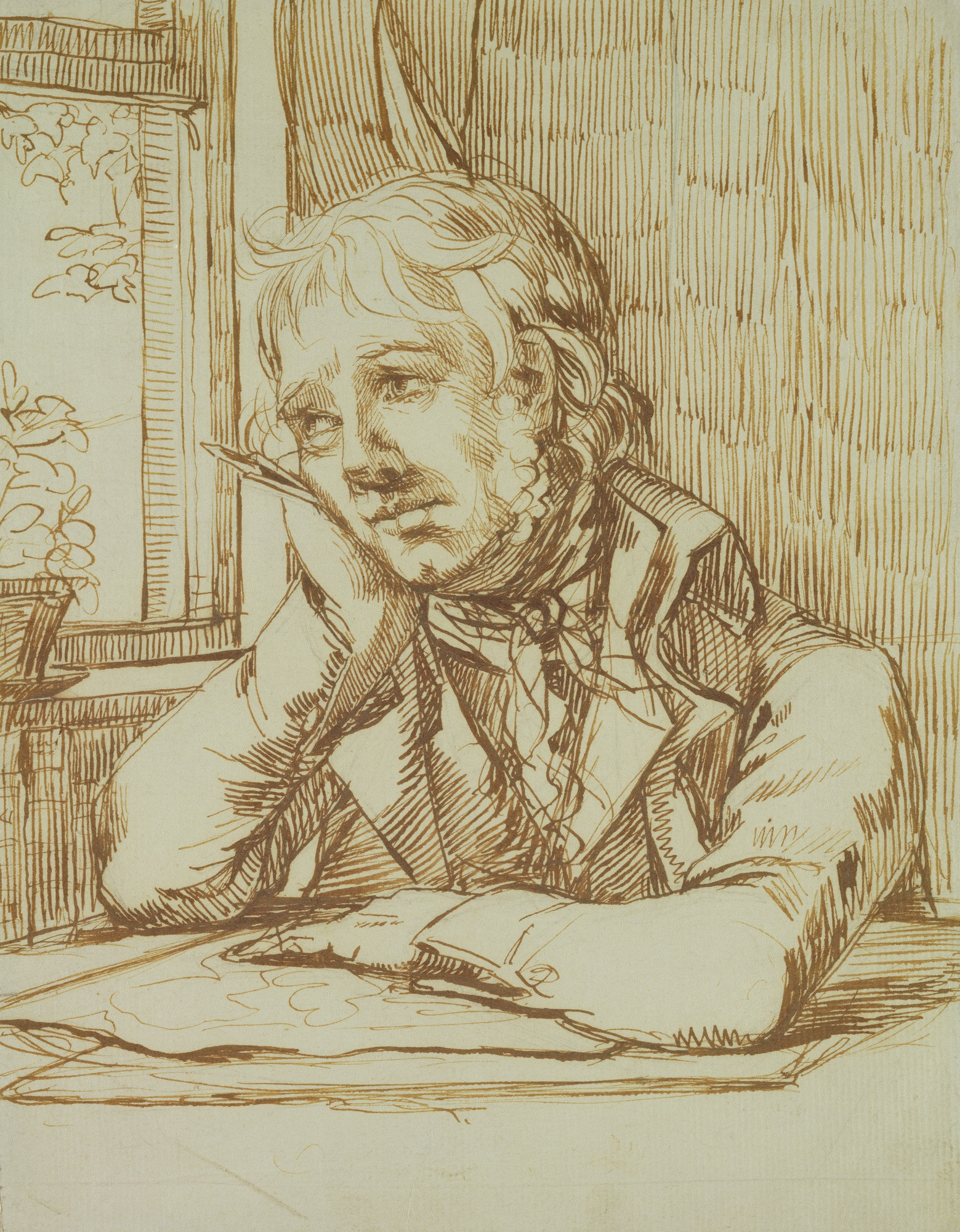
Friedrich's pre-1840 self-portrait

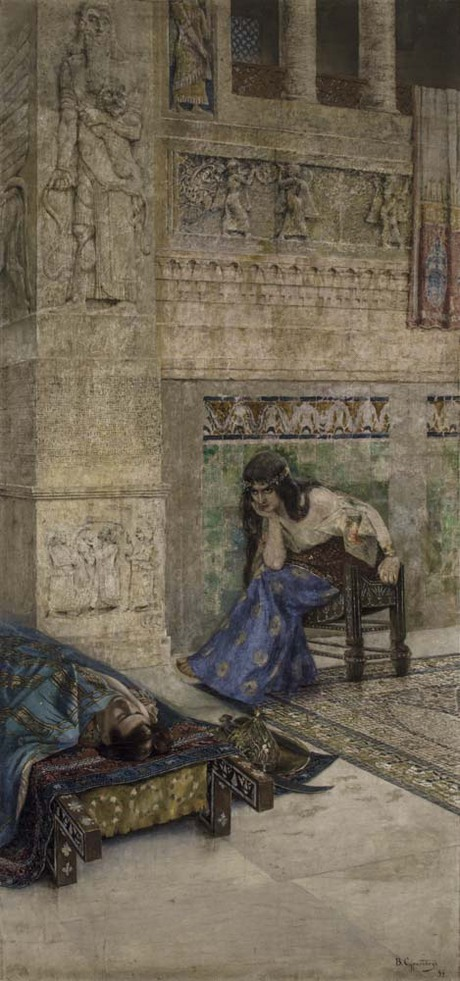
Semiramis and Ara (1899) by Vardges Sureniants

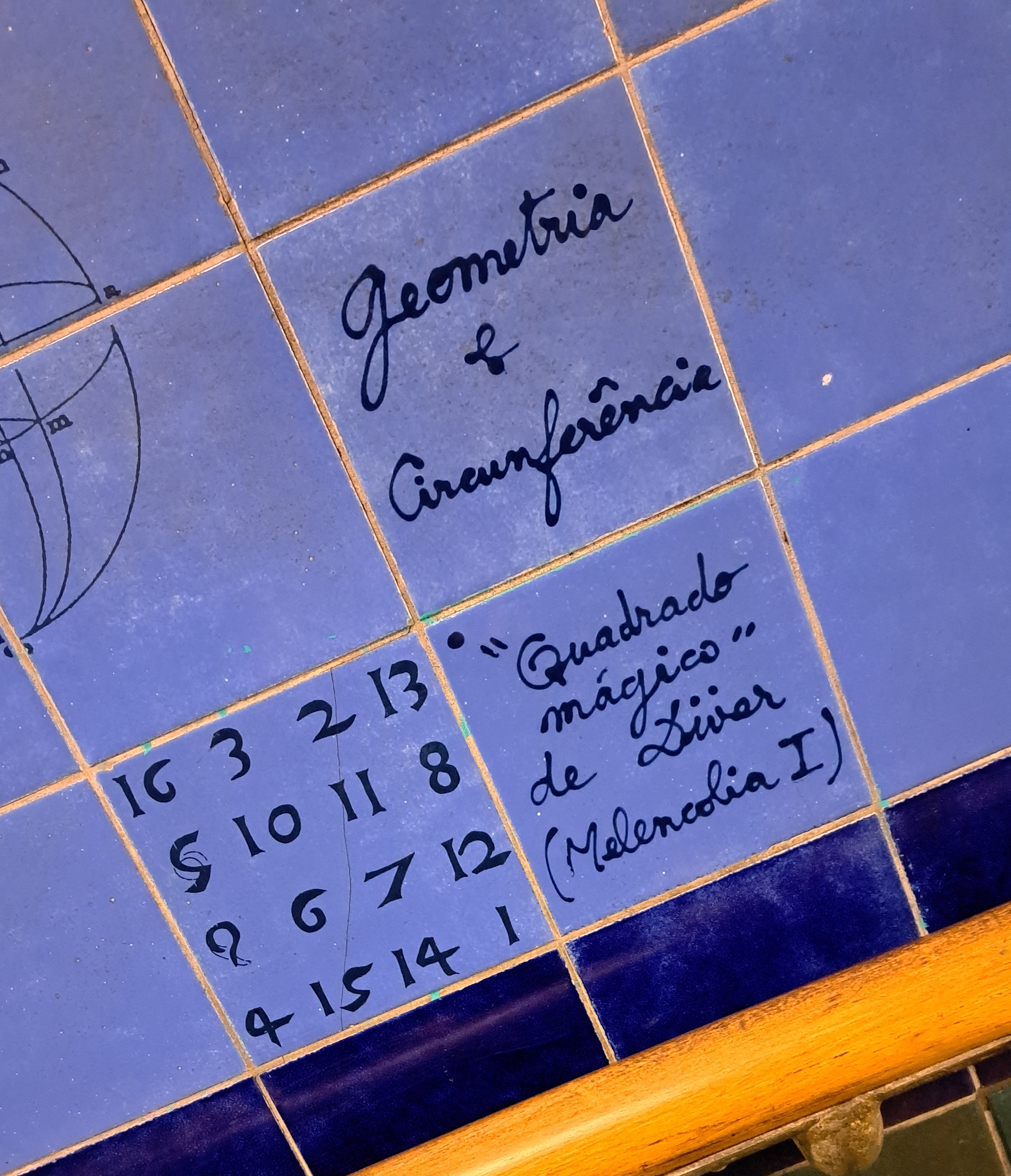
Dürer magic square in Lisbon Metro station Parque
