= Jean Duvet =

French artist (1485 – after 1562)

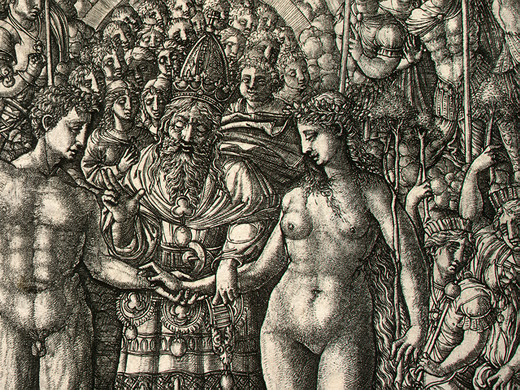
Detail of The Marriage of Adam and Eve, probably 1540/1555, engraving

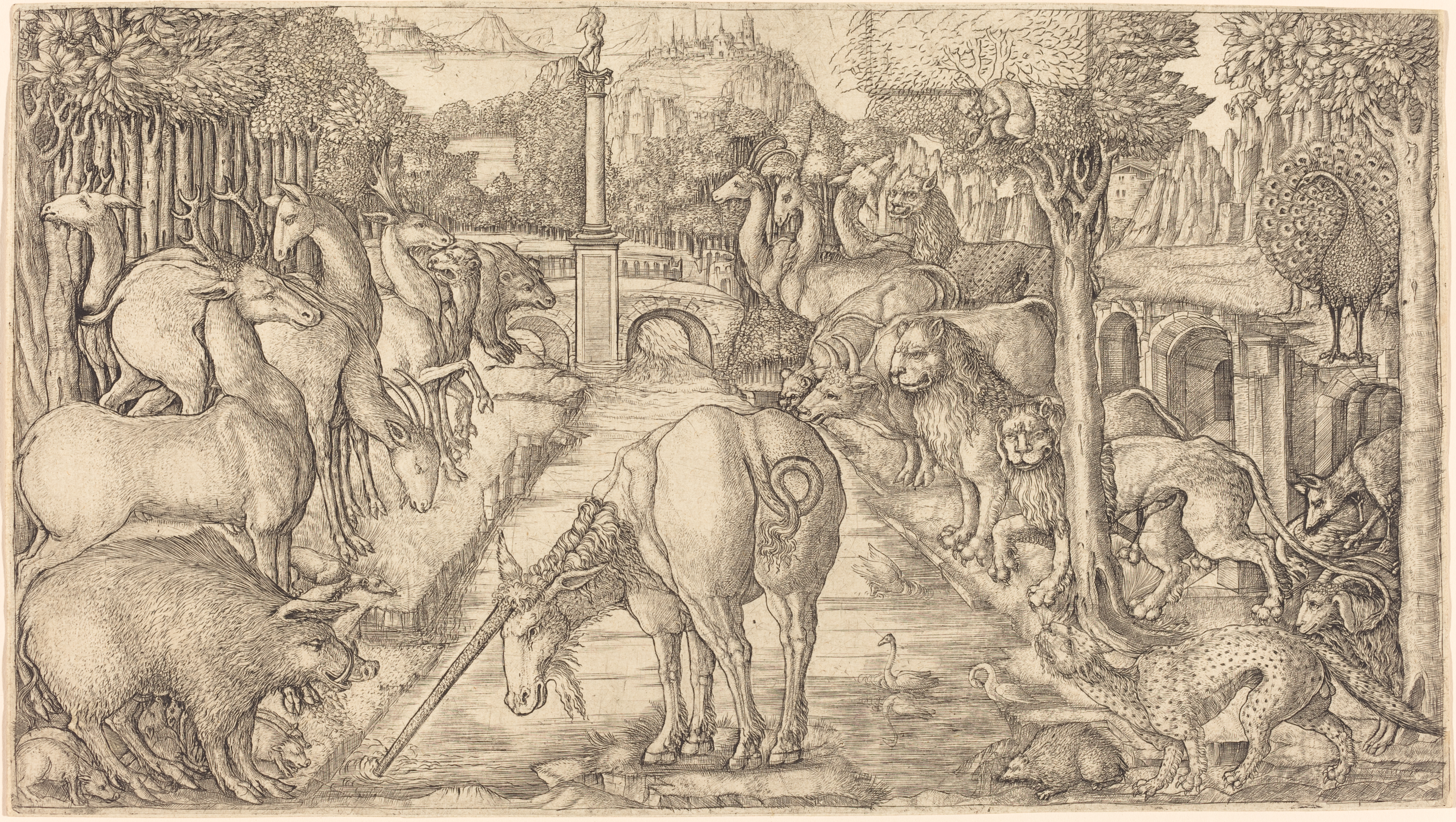
The Unicorn Purifies the Water with Its Horn, probably c. 1555–1561

Jean Duvet (1485 – after 1562) was a French Renaissance goldsmith and engraver, now best known for his engravings. He was the first significant French printmaker. He produced about 73 known plates, that convey a highly personal style, often compared to that of William Blake, with very crowded compositions, a certain naive quality, and intense religious feeling. According to Henri Zerner, his work has a "freedom and immediacy that have no equivalent in Renaissance printmaking". A degree of mystery surrounds his biography, as there is disagreement as to whether or not he was the Jean Duvet from Dijon who spent sixteen years in the militantly Calvinist city-state of Geneva.

== Life ==
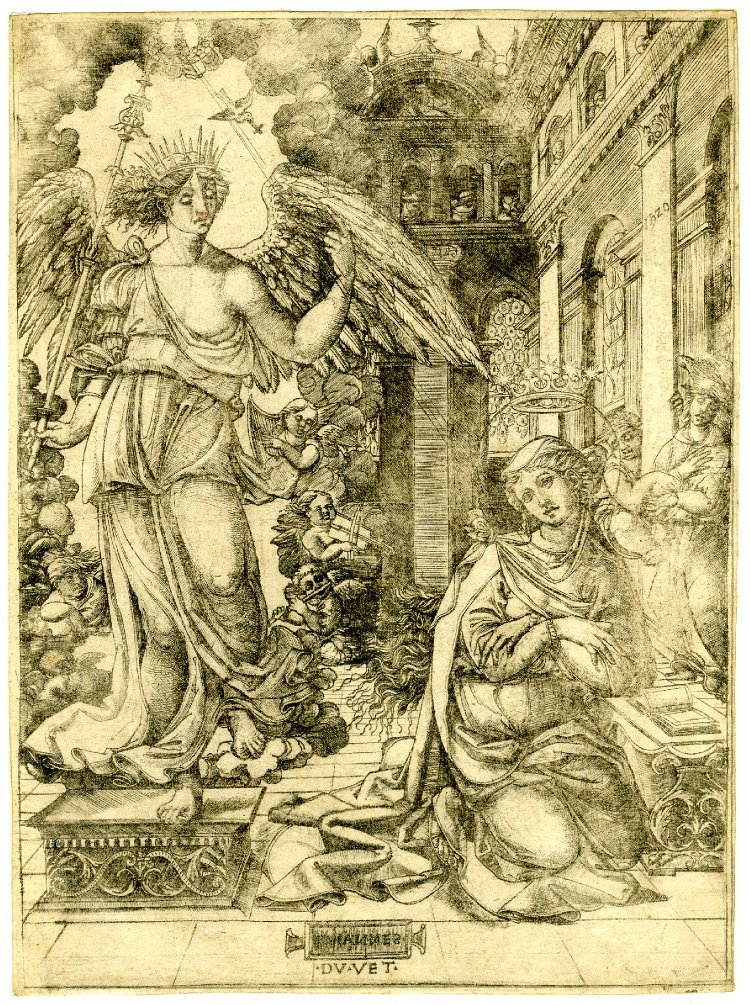
The Annunciation, 1520.

He was born to a Dijon goldsmith in 1485, presumably in Dijon itself, which until a decade before had been part of the independent state of the Duchy of Burgundy. He became a master of the Dijon Goldsmiths' guild in 1509, and may have travelled to Italy in about 1519; this is purely an inference from his prints, which show considerable Italian influence. His first dated print is The Annunciation from 1520, although others are probably earlier. A misunderstanding of the nature of a pilaster in this print, which shows a putto wrapped round one as though it were a thin sheet, unattached to the wall behind, perhaps suggests that his understanding of the Italian style was derived purely from prints, books and other objects brought back to France. Although he remained in the provinces, he was appointed goldsmith to both Francis I and Henry II. The first of these appointments was on the occasion of the King's visit to Langres, where he was already living, in 1521; he had been involved in the decorations for the Royal Entry. By the next royal visit, in 1533, he was in charge of the festivities and decoration. The influence of pageant tableaus and scenery has been detected in his prints. No identified examples of his goldsmithing survive, though commissions for Francis I and others are documented.

He died, probably in Langres, after 1562, when he is recorded as attending a town meeting there, though Zerner gives his death date as 1561 and Marqusee says that there is no specific documentation of Duvet after the last Geneva mention in 1556. His last dated print is the Frontispiece of 1555. He was certainly dead by 1570, but some authorities think he was alive until about then - 1570 is the death date given by the Getty Union Artist Names List for example.

=== Geneva theory ===
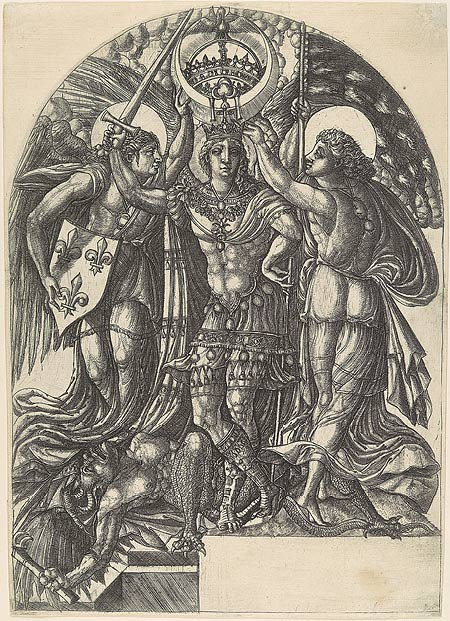
Henry II between France and Fame, c. 1548

A Jean Duvet from Dijon is also recorded working as a goldsmith in Calvinist Geneva from 1540–56, but most scholarly opinion now believes that this was someone else, probably his nephew. The question perhaps cannot be regarded as entirely settled. The Geneva Duvet was recorded as the son of "Loys Duvey, alias Drot de Dijon", probably Jean Duvet's brother, who became a Master in 1509. Eisler and Blunt favour the Geneva figure being Duvet himself, followed by Marqusee; Zerner and R. May do not. Yet another Jean Duvet, working as a goldsmith in Geneva, was condemned to death for extortion in Geneva in 1576.

The (earlier) Geneva Duvet is rather better documented, working for the city authorities in a number of capacities, and holding official office. Both Langres and Dijon were strongly Catholic centres during the period before the Wars of Religion, and Duvet is recorded in Langres as member of a militant Catholic lay fraternity founded in 1548. If his religious views had changed, Langres might well have been an uncomfortable place to remain. The printer of the Apocalypse was Jean de Tournes; his son, also called Jean de Tournes, moved from Lyon to Geneva in 1585 to escape religious persecution. No less than three Duvet engravings depict the Suicide of Judas, an exceptionally rare subject outside full cycles of the Passion of Christ, suggesting a "passionate interest in the subject", which may connect with personal religious struggles. Eisler dates these three between 1527 and the end of Duvet's career.

On the other hand, it is hard to reconcile the Geneva theory with his appointment as goldsmith to Henry II, who reigned from 1547, and the three plates celebrating Henry and the "mystique of divine monarchy" in extravagant terms, which may celebrate the re-dedication of the Order of Saint Michael by Henry in 1548.

== Works ==
All seventy-three prints listed by Eisler are very rare - only seven copies of the Apocalypse with text are known, each with slightly different contents, although impressions of individual prints are commoner, and mostly earlier. Some individual engravings survive only in unique impressions. It is assumed that most of his prints in his characteristic crowded style and round-topped format date from the period 1540-55, based mainly on the 1555 date of the Apocalypse frontispiece. A few simpler but intense prints are usually taken to date from his last years, when his horror vacui, or inability to leave space unfilled, abated somewhat.

He copied prints by Marcantonio and Mantegna, and his burin technique is especially indebted to the former. A very free copy of Mantegna's Entombment shows him imposing his own vision with complete confidence on the composition of another artist.

=== The Apocalypse series ===
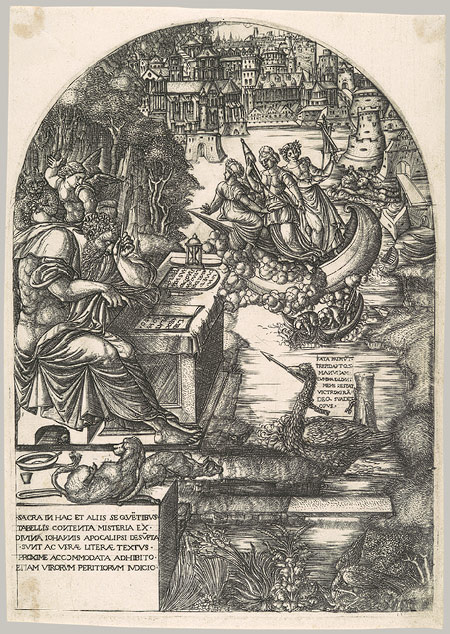
Frontispiece to the Apocalypse series, 1555.

His most famous works are his series of twenty-three engravings on the Apocalypse, the frontispiece of which (above) is dated 1555. They borrow heavily from the famous series in woodcut of Albrecht Dürer (1498) but are very different in style - crowded, even confused, but urgent and intense. Eight of the series derive their composition in some way from Dürer. This was published, with the accompanying text, in Lyon in 1561. Like many of his mature prints these use a round-topped shape. The frontispiece has the Latin inscriptions: "Jean Duvet goldsmith of Langres aged 70 made these histories 1555" (on the plate on the table) and "The Fates are pressing, already sight fails, the mind remains victorious, and the great work is completed" (by the swan), suggesting this was last of the series to be completed.

=== The Unicorn and other works ===
His other famous work is his series of six prints on the unicorn, still very personal but more lyrical in style; until the nineteenth century he was known as the "Unicorn Master" after these. Series celebrating the French monarchy and Genesis were left aside after a few plates each.

== Style and legacy ==
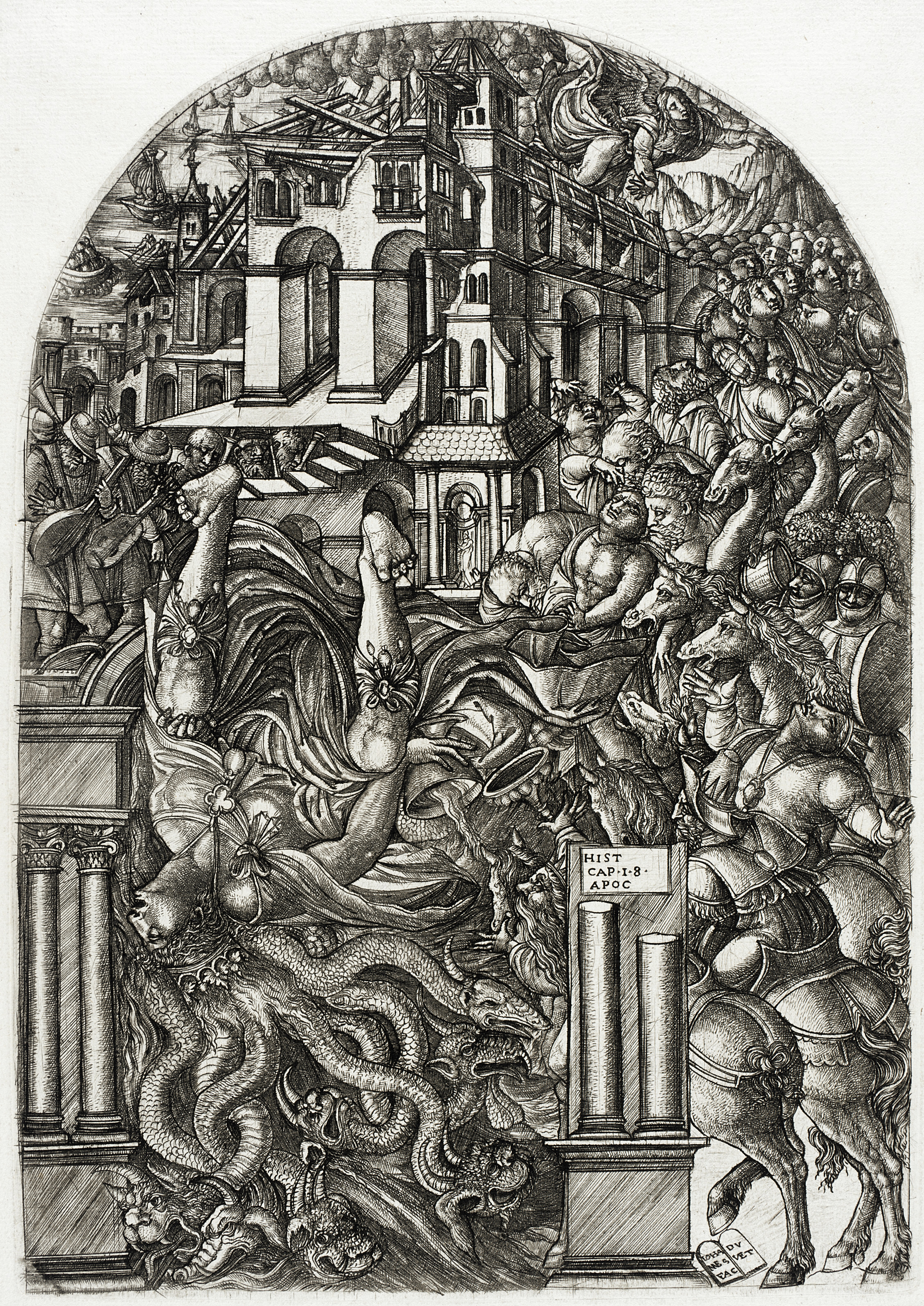
The Fall of Babylon, from the Apocalypse series, circa 1555, Engraving, Plate size: 11 7/8 x 8 3/8 in.

Duvet's work contrasts strongly with the sophisticated art produced at the court of Fontainebleau. In its religious mysticism and quasi-Gothic sensibility, it partly harks back to the Middle Ages. Duvet's engraving known as Moses Surrounded by the Patriarchs (1540–50), for example, draws on a common medieval theme, the ancestors and antetypes of Christ. The driving force of Duvet's composition is the visionary nature of his material, which inspires him to place symbolic expression ahead of considerations of proportion, scale, or space. He also illustrates his texts literally.

When St. John speaks of a voice "as if it were a trumpet", Duvet depicts a trumpet blasting into the saint's ear. The urgency and confidence of Duvet's vision triumph over his technical limitations. As well as recalling the medieval past, Duvet's work also looks forward to the more agitated style of the art produced during the French Wars of Religion later in the sixteenth century.

Duvet's work was produced, like that of Rosso and Pontormo in the Florence of the 1520s, in an urban atmosphere of religious excitement, since the town of Langres was in the grip of an enthusiastic and emotional Catholic revival at the time. Duvet shares with those Florentine artists the style of distorted and crowded figures and borrowings from Dürer, though his use of Gothic elements is more pronounced. Some scholars have also compared Duvet's art to that of William Blake (1757–1827). Both were visionary artists with the "supreme confidence of the mystic"; both were in some ways technically incompetent. They were also both inspired by medieval artists and by engravers of the High Renaissance and drew on Mannerist forms. Blake may have known of the earlier artist, since certain echoes of Duvet's work in Blake's seem more than coincidental.

== See also ==
- Edict of Châteaubriant
