= Saint Michael Fighting the Dragon =

Woodcut by Albrecht Dürer

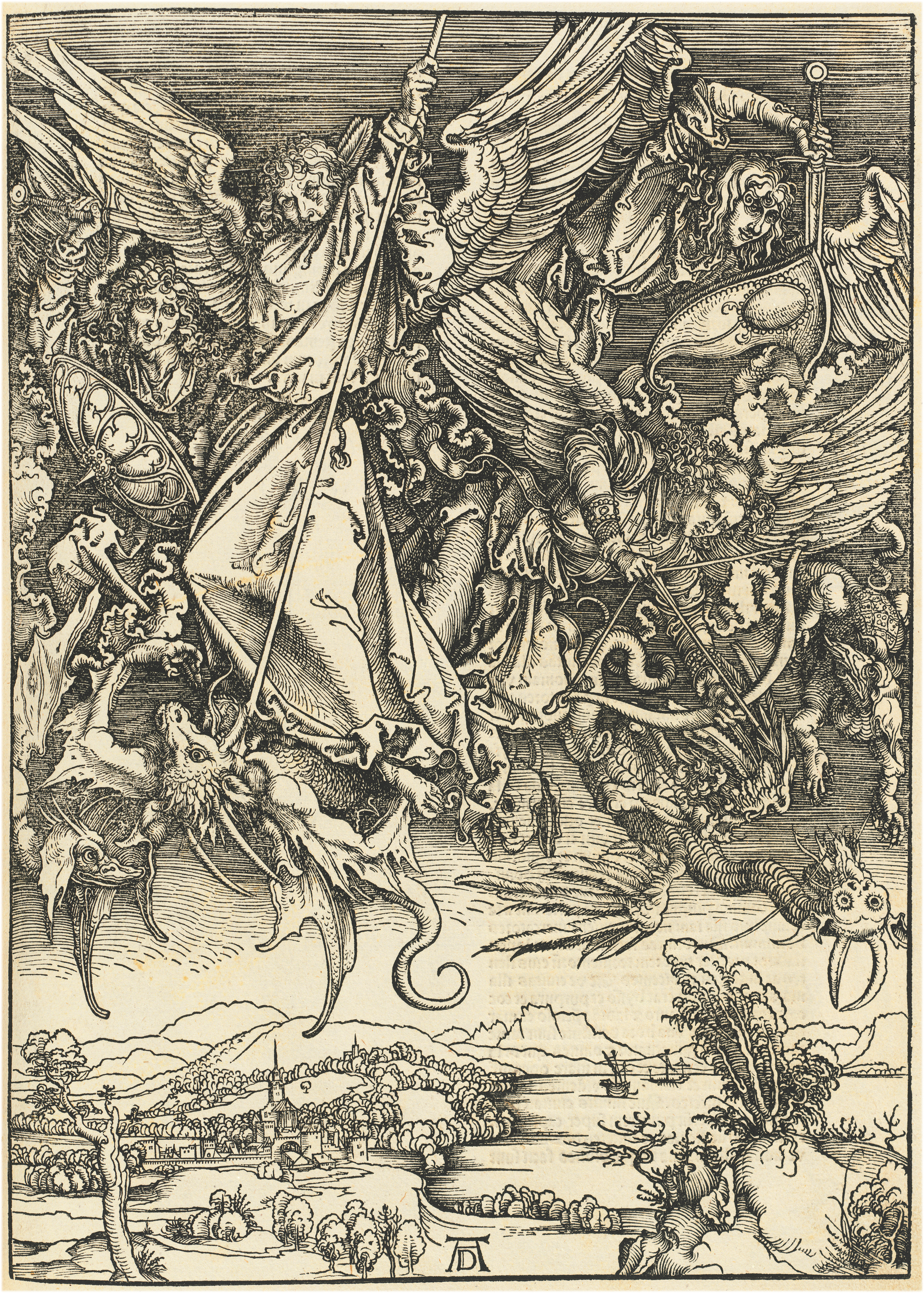
Saint Michael Fighting the Dragon by Albrecht Durer

Saint Michael Fighting the Dragon is a woodcut of 1498 by Albrecht Dürer, part of his Apocalypse series, illustrating the Book of Apocalypse or Revelation of St. John.

== Subject ==
"And there was war in heaven: Michael and his angels fought against the dragon; and the dragon fought and his angels, and prevailed not; neither was their place found any more in heaven" (Rev. 12:7). As recounted by the Revelation of Saint John, at the end of the world, war will break out between Heaven and Hell, between good and evil. As the commander of the Army of God, Archangel Michael leads the other angels in the fight against evil, represented in this picture by a seven-headed dragon. Each of the dragon's heads represents one of the seven deadly sins. Dürer chose to capture this fight between good and evil at the moment when Saint Michael is thrusting his spear into one of the heads. Surrounding Saint Michael are three other angels ready to attack. Beneath the fighting lies a calm and serene landscape with mountains and a small town, highlighted by a church with a tall spire, in the distance. At the bottom in the center of the page Dürer has placed his distinctive "AD" monogram that is in all of his engravings.

== Characteristics ==
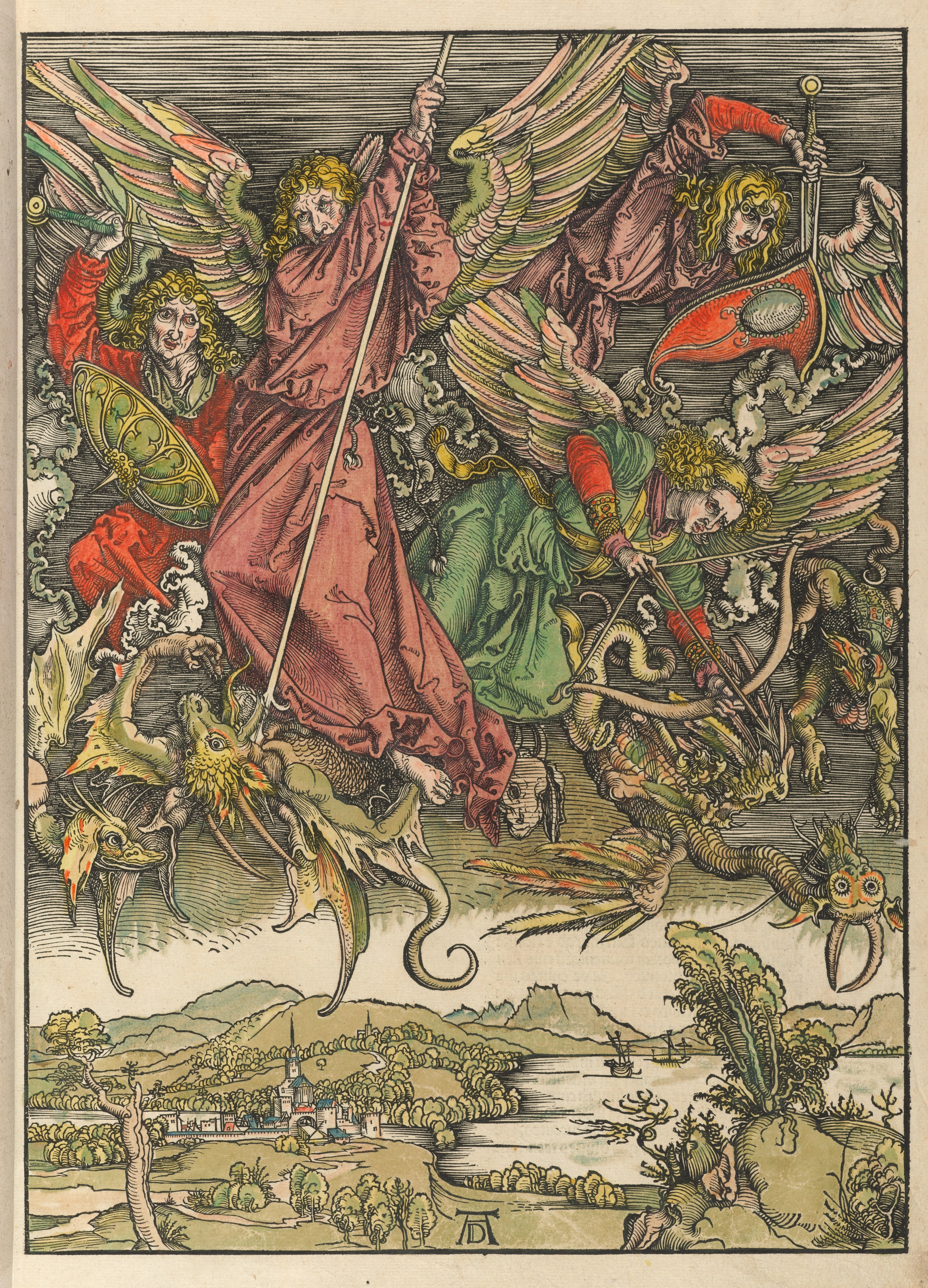
Impression with hand-colouring

Albrecht Dürer considered printmaking to be one of the most important art forms, possibly even equal to the art of painting. His technical skill is well demonstrated in St. Michael Fighting the Dragon. The influence of Dürer's training under Michael Wolgemut on the quality of Dürer's works can be seen in the vast amount of detail in the print. Dürer includes details ranging from the small trees surrounding the town to details of St. Michael's face. Dürer uses atmospheric perspective to create the illusion of space by depicting the mountains with less detail the farther away they are supposed to be. He creates different light and dark tones through his use of lines. In respect to the poses of the figures, especially Archangel Michael, Dürer broke with the traditional pose for a hero fighting against evil that was viewed as more elegant. Instead Dürer put St. Michael in a pose which captures the magnitude of the task at hand. St. Michael's eyebrows are furrowed with concentration and his hands are on the sword, about to fiercely attack the dragon. All original woodcuts in the series were made on pear wood.

== Background ==
=== Humanism ===
Beginning in the 14th century with the work of Petrarch, the father of humanism, humanist ideals began to spread throughout Europe. Early humanists stressed the importance of studying the classics, Greek and Roman works, and learning the liberal arts. During the 15th century, Renaissance humanists applied humanism to their civic lives and stated that people should use their knowledge in the service of the state. They also believed that individuals had a great potential to succeed and could use that potential to improve society. In northern Europe, Christian Humanists combined humanist ideals with Christianity by emphasizing both education and scriptural knowledge. Artistically, humanists encouraged the study of the human form to accurately portray the beauty of the human body. One of the leading Christian Humanists was Desiderius Erasmus, who became a friend of Albrecht Dürer when Dürer visited the Netherlands in 1520 and 1521. Well before that visit, Dürer traveled to Italy in the autumn of 1494 and talked with many Italian humanists. He also visited the workshops of numerous Italian humanist artists, including Andrea Mantegna and Giovanni Bellini. Due to this exposure to humanism and Italian art, Dürer became fascinated with how to best capture the proportions of the human body and consequently spent much time studying the human body and anatomical proportions. This interest can not only be seen in many of his paintings, but also in a number of his engravings, including St. Michael Fighting the Dragon.

=== Rise of Nuremberg ===
Another major influence on Dürer's works was the rise of Nuremberg as an intellectual center and as a leader in engravings. One of the main reasons behind Nuremberg's prominence was the release of the Nuremberg Chronicle in 1493. This book contained around 650 original illustrations from Michael Wolgemut, one of the leading engravers of the late-Gothic era, and his workshop. The Nuremberg Chronicle not only demonstrated the capabilities of the new printing press, but also paved the way for the work of Albrecht Dürer in the coming years.

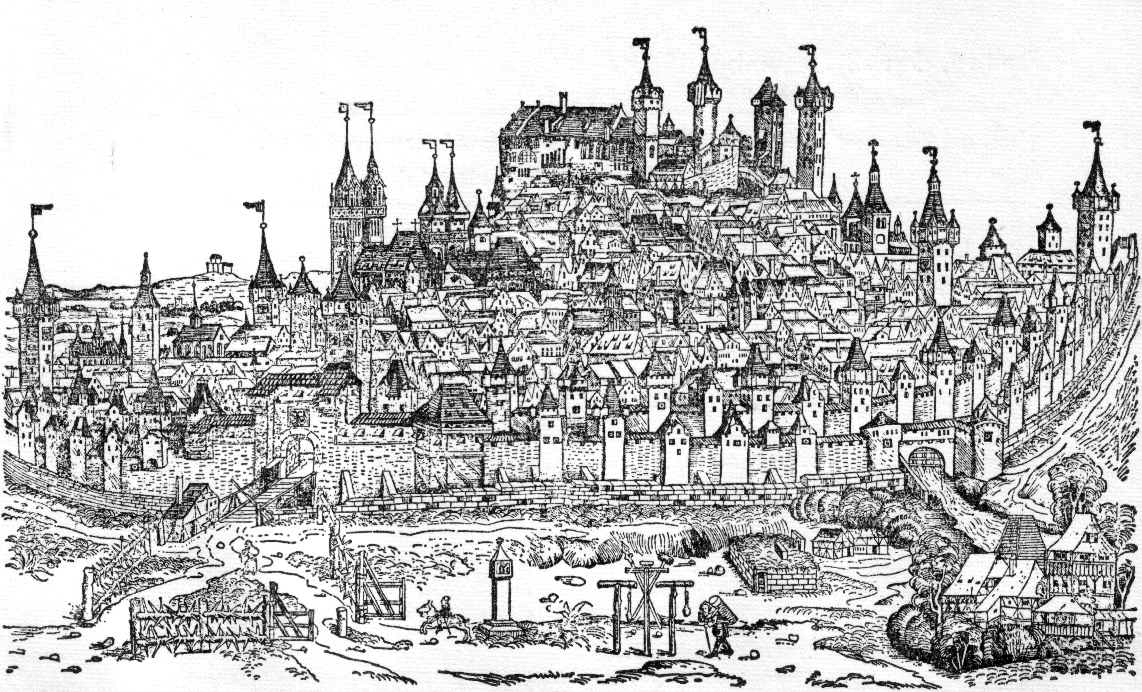
Picture of Nuremberg from the Nuremberg Chronicle

Albrecht Dürer was an apprentice under Wolgemut and learned the art of engraving from one of the most well known engravers of the time. Technically, the development of better printing presses in Nuremberg allowed for Dürer to include much more detail in his work, from depicting St. Michael's hair with little curls to capturing the sails of two boats off in the distance. It also allowed for his work to be more easily distributed.

== See also ==
- List of engravings by Albrecht Dürer
- List of woodcuts by Albrecht Dürer
