= Apocalypse (Dürer) =

Series of fifteen woodcuts by Albrecht Dürer

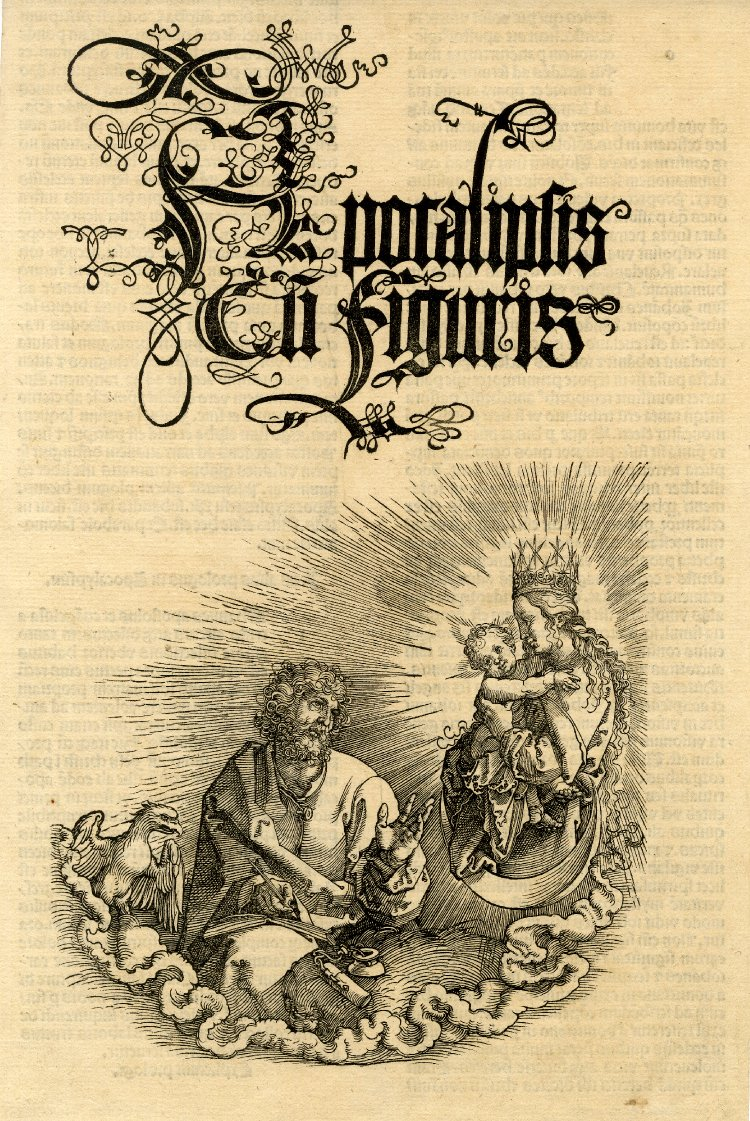
- Title page of the second Latin edition of the Apocalypse series (1511)
- Artist: Albrecht Dürer
- Year: 1511
- Medium: print from woodblock engraving

The Apocalypse, properly Apocalypse with Pictures (Latin: Apocalipsis cum figuris; German: Die heimliche Offenbaru[n]g ioh[an]nis), is a 1498 printed book by Albrecht Dürer containing fifteen woodcuts accompanied by text. The book depicts scenes from the Book of Revelation, and rapidly brought Dürer fame across Europe. These woodcuts likely drew on theological advice, particularly from Johannes Pirckheimer, the father of Dürer's friend Willibald Pirckheimer.

Work on the book started during Dürer's first trip to Italy (1494–95), It was published in both Latin and German at Nuremberg in 1498, at a time when much of secular Europe feared an invasion of the Ottoman Empire and Christian Europe anticipated a possible Last Judgment in the year 1500. Dürer was the publisher and seller of this series, and became the first artist to publish a book and create a copyright. Considering the 15 woodcuts, The Four Horsemen of the Apocalypse (c. 1497–98), referring to Revelation 6:1–8, is often viewed as the most famous piece. The overall layout of the cycle has the illustrations on the recto (right) and the text on the following verso (left). This would suggest the importance of illustration over text.

In 1511, Dürer published the second edition of Apocalypse in a combined edition with his Life of the Virgin and Large Passion; single impressions were also produced and sold.

== Description ==
Originally cut onto pear wood, Dürer depicts the Book of Revelation across 15 woodcuts. On the verso side of the page, Dürer includes the writings of the Book of Revelation in a two-column format. This form of text printed on one side of a page and an image on the opposite page was used earlier by Dürer's godfather, Anton Koberger, and his printing of the Liber chronicarum. Subject matter was likely taken from the Low German Bible, which Koberger had included in his version of the Bible. Additionally, Dürer may have also been exposed to the woodcut images of the Strasbourg Bible.

To circulate his work, Dürer created a 15-page booklet that presented the woodcut print first on the right of the page, followed by descriptive text on the back or the left of the page. This would be a reversal of what was normally done during the latter 15th century, as text was typically represented before any contextual images. The second edition of Dürer's Apocalypse series was later published with an additional title page depicting the Virgin Mary appearing to Saint John. The Assumption being depicted on the cover to a book imagining the Apocalypse may serve as a form of blessing, which establishes the idea that the Virgin Mary herself will care for those who have faith continuously throughout the Apocalypse; she will show pious people to paradise.

Dürer originally intended to include every scene of the Book of Revelation. However, theological insight was likely given to Dürer by Johannes Pirckheimer, though other scholars claim that religious consult could have been given by Provost Sixtus Tucher. This advice may have aided Dürer in condensing his series down to the fifteen woodcuts he ended up publishing. Earlier woodcuts depicted the Book of Revelation in unrealistic way, but Dürer, after traveling to Italy, was able to combine early ideology and biblical iconography with his artistic skill in order to create a work of art that was realistic, expressive, and practical to view.

One overlooked detail within this series is the inclusion of Ottoman Turks in this Christian Apocalypse. Dürer did not learn about the Turks through firsthand experience. Instead, he learned about the Ottoman culture from Gentile Bellini after his return from the Court of Mehmed II. This second-hand information was used to both create unique characters, but may have also unintentionally fueled anti-Ottoman propaganda in creating a parallel between the Ottoman Empire and the Anti-Christ.

Dürer takes a realistic approach when creating his scenes. In previous depictions of the Apocalypse, artists had fantasized certain aspects of the event. Rather than a skeleton on horseback representing Death in The Four Horsemen of the Apocalypse, Dürer depicts an emaciated man riding an equally malnourished horse. In Saint John Eating the Book, Saint John is physically eating the book, and his facial expressions are strained as he consumes the pages. The weather conditions and vegetations are likewise realistic and accurate with no overwhelming exaggerations. In St John kneeling before Christ and the twenty-four elders, a natural scene of castles, cliffs, plants, and a small river can be seen as a contrasting the Heavenly event taking place above. Though a scene of chaos, the weather in the background of The Four Horsemen of the Apocalypse is placid. Even in a scene of chaos in The opening of the seventh seal and the eagle crying 'Woe,' the land is tranquil and it is the heavenly bodies that are raining disaster upon the earth.

== Historical context ==
During the 1490s, there was a wide belief spread throughout Europe, popularized by Christian eschatological ideas, that the world was going to end by the year 1500. This instance of apocalypticism was reliant on the phrase "half-time after the time," which appears in the Book of Revelation. Many preached of the Apocalypse coming at the beginning of the 16th century, one notable figure being Girolamo Savonarola. Another work of art that express this apocalyptic prophecy of the world ending is Sandro Botticelli's Mystic Nativity Scene. When the first edition of Dürer's woodcuts was published in 1498, this doomsday ideology was at its peak.

Also occurring during this time period was the growing threat of a Turkish invasion into Europe. A potential reference to this looming invasion can be seen in the engravings The Martyrdom of St. John, Opening of the Fifth and Sixth Seals, The Whore of Babylon, and The Beast with the Lamb's Horns and Beast with Seven Heads. In these panels in particular, characters donning turbans can be observed as unique characters.

In The Martyrdom of Saint John, the four men wearing turbans are all uniquely styled and have individual reactions to what is happening to Saint John. The placement of these Ottomans may give perspective to Dürer's choice in including them. In this woodcut, Ottomans are depicted as pagan torturers and onlookers. Further, the Turks being depicted in this manner could be symbols for non-Christian faiths that will be struck down by the events of the Apocalypse. The most decorated Ottoman figure, second from the left in the midground of the print, may be Emperor Domitian, here depicted as a Turk.

In the Opening of the Fifth and Sixth Seals, the figure wearing a turban is amongst those attempting to escape from the earthquake that is taking place. Other diverse figures can be observed such as a king, bishop, pope, and monk; however, the implied Turk is grouped with the fleeing women and children. This separation could be supportive of making Turks appear less powerful than how they were perceived at the time.

The turbaned figures in the Whore of Babylon could represent foreign nations being subject to the Apocalypse and being seduced by the Whore of Babylon. However, unlike other distinct figures present, the implied Turk not only has his back to the viewer, but is also wearing Ottoman clothing similar to how Domitian was depicted in The Martyrdom of Saint John. This could imply how the Ottomans or other pagan cultures would be the first to be seduced by the Whore of Babylon and thus, be the first to be claimed by Satan.

The final woodcut where turban figures are present is The beast with the lamb's horns and the beast with seven heads. Here, amongst other unique individuals, the Turk is seen showing devotion to the seven-headed beast. This may be another attempt at representing nations and religions that will falsely worship a monster, thematically Satan, over God. Another link between Ottoman symbolism and the beast with seven heads is the number seven. Not only was the Ottoman capital of Istanbul constructed on seven hills, but it was also believed that the seventh sultan would be the leader of the Apocalypse. An error does exist for who would lead this Apocalypse. By one counting, Mehmed II would be the seventh sultan; another count would make his son, Bayezid II, the seventh sultan.

Dürer utilizes the theme of a foreign invasion to parallel the Ottoman Empire with the Anti-Christ and his invasion of the Earth. This metaphor gives the Ottoman Empire the power to destroy European culture, much like the Biblical Apocalypse destroys the Earth. However, this form of symbolism is only visible in four of the fifteen woodcuts, so it may or may not be convincing as a theme across the entire cycle. Dürer's true inspiration for these inserts is unknown; turbans may have simply been a depiction of anyone outside the Christian religion, or perhaps he did intend this form of anti-Ottoman propaganda to appear in his work.

== The Four Horsemen of the Apocalypse ==
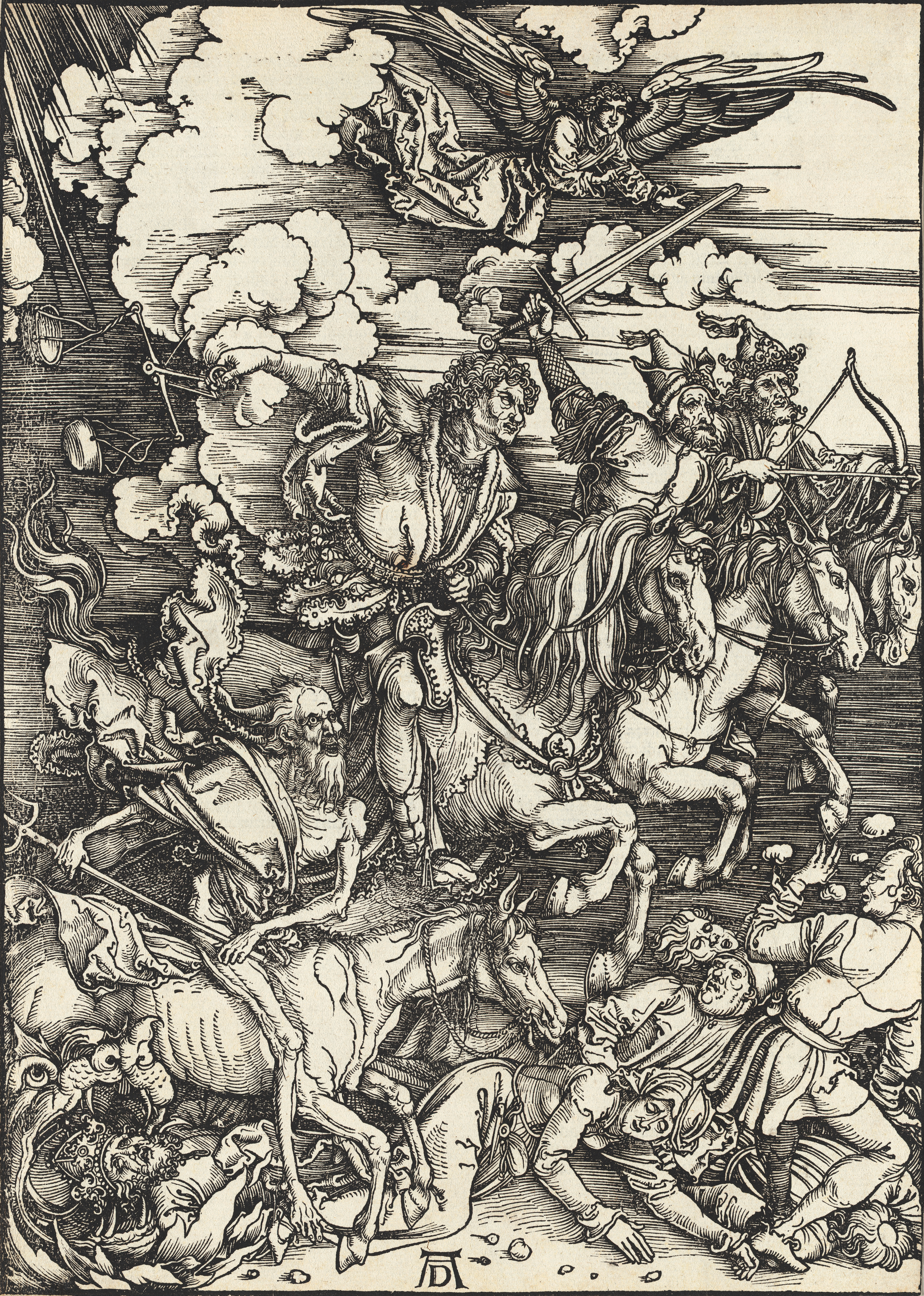
The fourth woodcut of the Apocalypse series, The Four Horsemen of the Apocalypse (1498)

The fourth woodcut of the Apocalypse cycle, The Four Horsemen of the Apocalypse, depicts the first four of seven seals that must be opened in order for the Apocalypse to begin. Though hostile in nature, these riders are in no way connected to Satan. Rather, this nature of imagery can be viewed as a finite end to the world, giving humanity a true end. Respective to their Biblical introductions, the first four seals and four horsemen are Conquest, War, Famine, and Death. This is by far the most reproduced and recognizable of The Apocalypse prints, as it has various Christian and secular symbols as well as several references in popular culture.

An obvious difficulty with these woodcuts are that they are black and white when three of the four horses are described as having some tint of color. Dürer remedies this by ordering the horsemen in the reverse order that they are summoned and by depicting each rider's weapon of choice prominently.

In maintaining Biblical order of introduction, the horseman furthest right is Conquest. Dürer denotes Conquest with his bow and arrow (Rev 6:1–2). Although an arrow is not mentioned, Dürer presents Conquest as preparing to shoot one. The second seal, War, is the second horseman from the right. His weapon, a longsword, is held high and readied for battle (Rev 6:3–4). Though War's horse is meant to be a fiery red, its color cannot be differentiated from Conquest's steed. Famine is the horseman third from the right. The third seal brandishes scales as his weapon. Though not a direct killer, famine's scales represent how wheat and barley would be tightly rationed and highly priced during the Apocalypse as they were nearly wiped out, but oil and wine would remain intact (Rev 6:3–4). The final horseman, but appearing first to a sinistrodextral viewer, is Death. The fourth seal is the most distinctive horseman as he is noticeably older than the other horseman and incredibly malnourished. Much like his rider, Death's horse is also in an emaciated state, appearing to painfully and directly trample those in his path. Unlike the other horsemen, Death is not given a tangible weapon. Instead, Death is charged with killing whoever is left alive when Conquest, War, and Famine have completed their rides (Rev 6:7–8). However, to maintain consistency, Dürer outfitted Death with a trident, not unlike those given to Poseidon in other mythos. The final component of this onset of the Apocalypse is the creature appearing at the bottom left corner of the woodcut. The monster, described as being somewhat reptilian, has a Bishop in its mouth and is preparing to consume him. This smaller scene could be a parallel to the Protestant Reformation, wherein the Bishop represents the dominance of Christianity and the hellish creature represents the Protestant rebellion.

Dürer does not include Saint John in this particular scene. This may be Dürer's way of placing the viewer in the saint's place, viewing the Apocalypse and experiencing the world-ending events on one's own. Dürer was a purposeful artist, so this concept potentially has validity to it.

== Apocalypse-Inspired artworks ==
Jean Duvet's series of the same name, Apocalypse, is a set of 15 engravings that emulates the subject matter taken on by Dürer in his mature cycle. Though of the same topic, Duvet creates his set utilizing his own unique engraving style. Duvet's series was fully published in 1561, with the first plate dating 6 years earlier in 1555.

Flemish artist Frans Masereel created his World War I series of 26 drawings The Apocalypse of Our Time (German: Die Apokalypse unserer Zeit) between 1940 and 1944.Similarly to Duvet and Dürer, Masereel's original series comprised 25 ink drawings. In 1953, he would add a self-portrait to his set, bringing the page count to 26. This cycle is heavily influenced by Masereel's escape from Paris in 1940 as German troops began to occupy Southern France.

In 1943, Benton Spruance made a lithograph titled Riders of the Apocalypse. Much like Masereel's Apocalypse of Our Times, Spruance modernizes the idea of an apocalypse. In this lithograph, the riders of the Apocalypse aren't personified seals of a Biblical scroll; they are fighter planes depicted in an abstract art style. Much of Spruance's work is attributed to indirect experience as to what is happening in the world outside of his own life. He also happened to draw meaning from his readings, of which included Biblical focus, saints, and other religious deities.

== Gallery ==
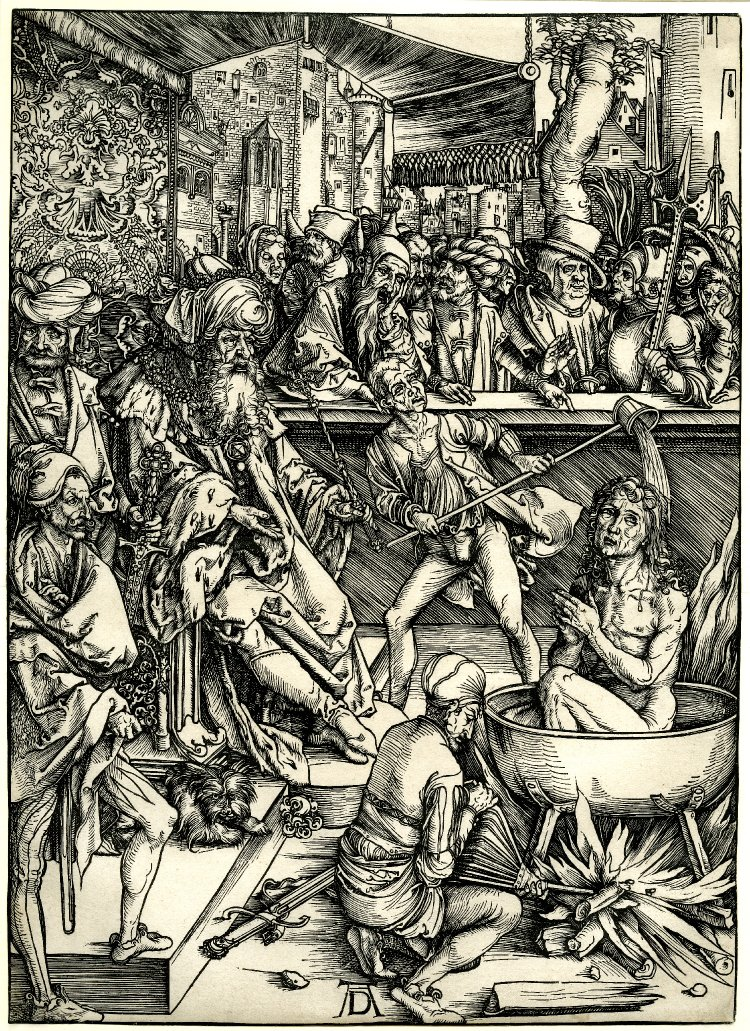
1. The martyrdom of St John

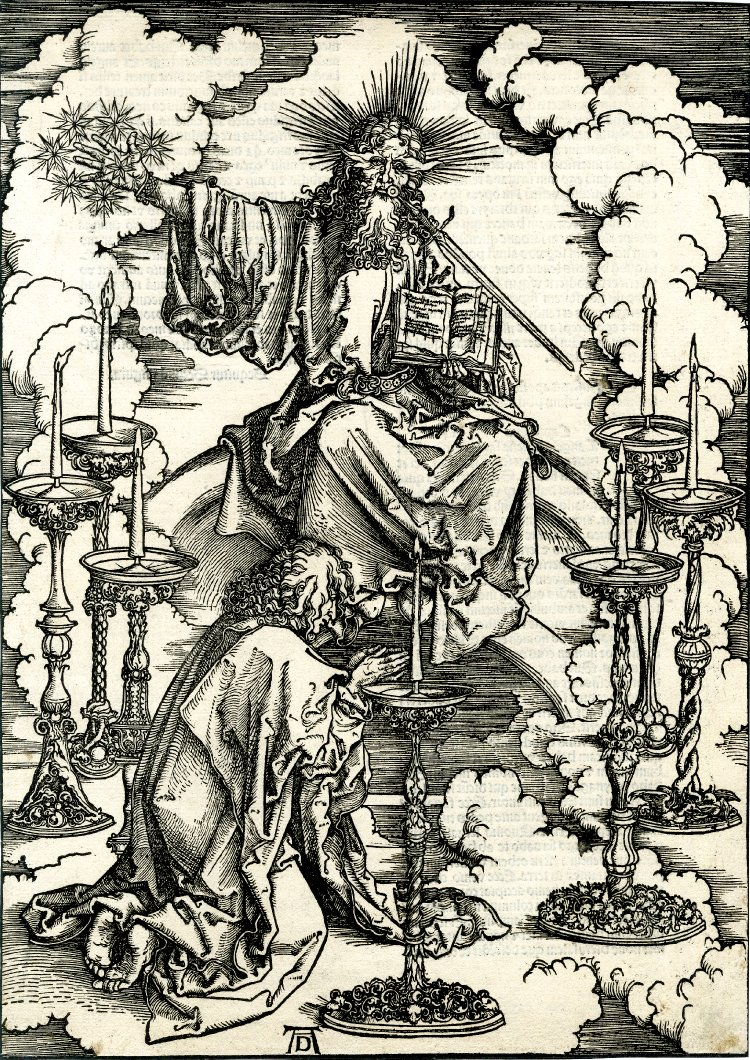
2. St John's vision of the seven candlesticks

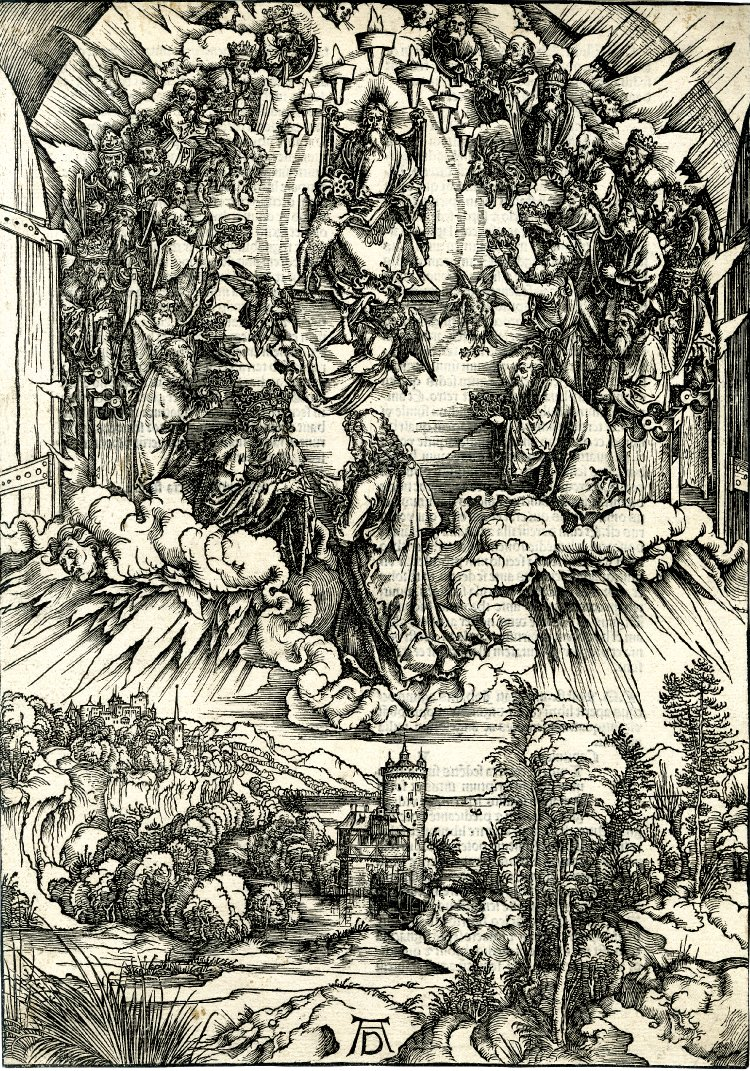
3. St John kneeling before Christ and the twenty-four elders

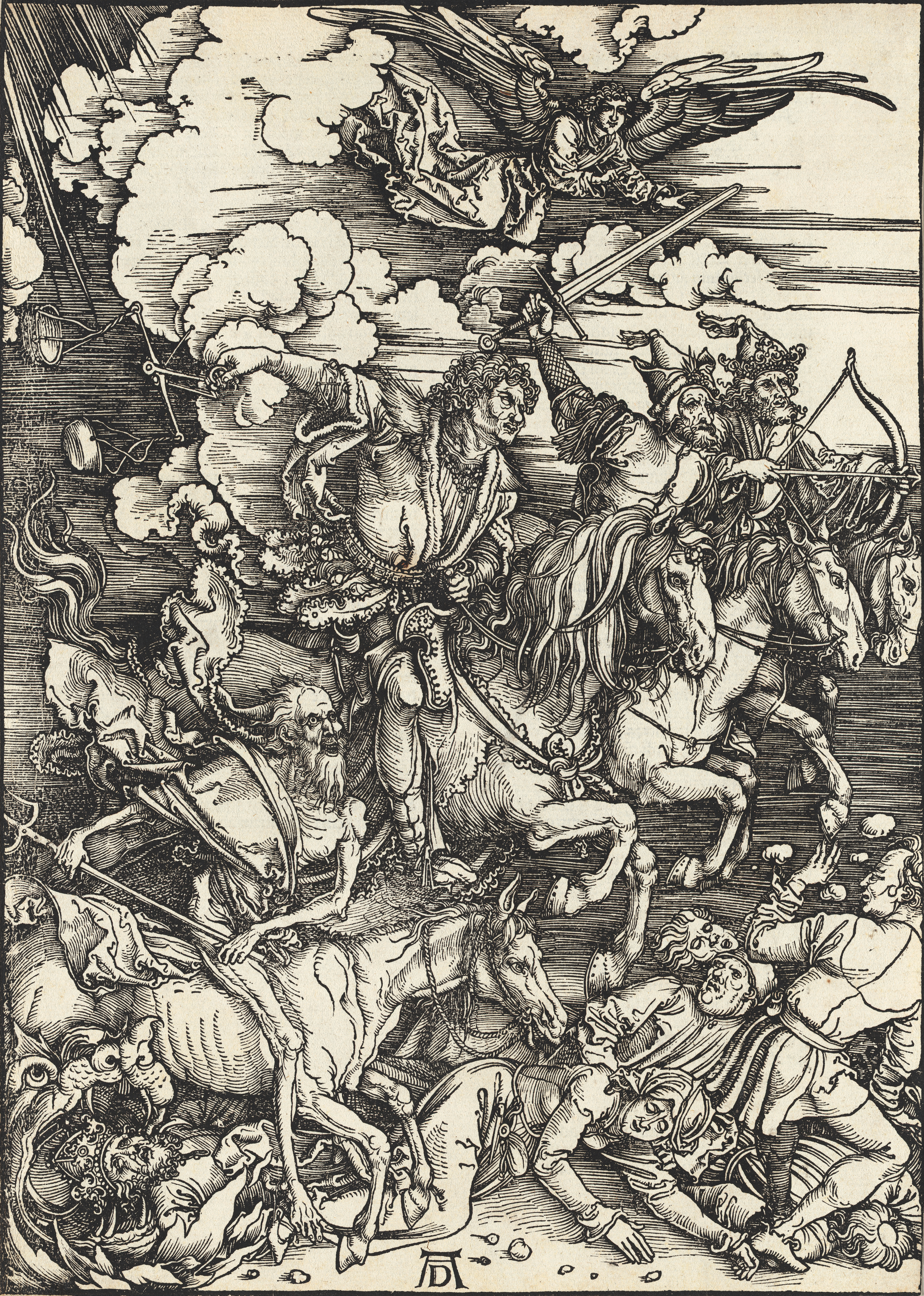
4. The four horsemen of the Apocalypse

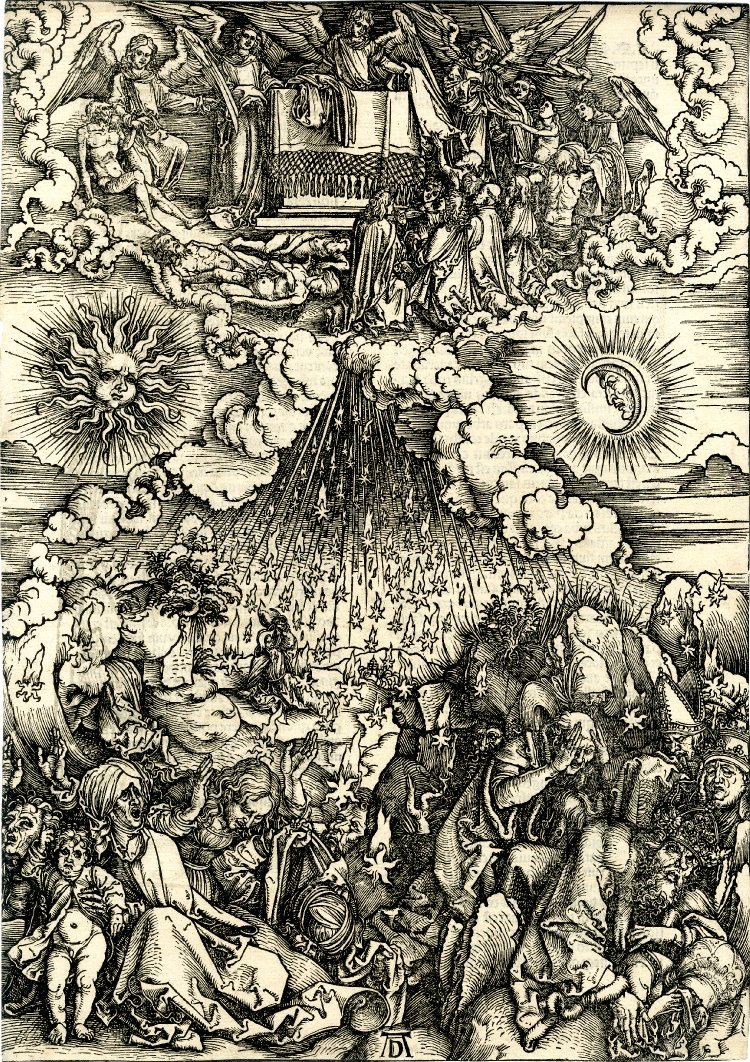
5. The opening of the fifth and sixth seals

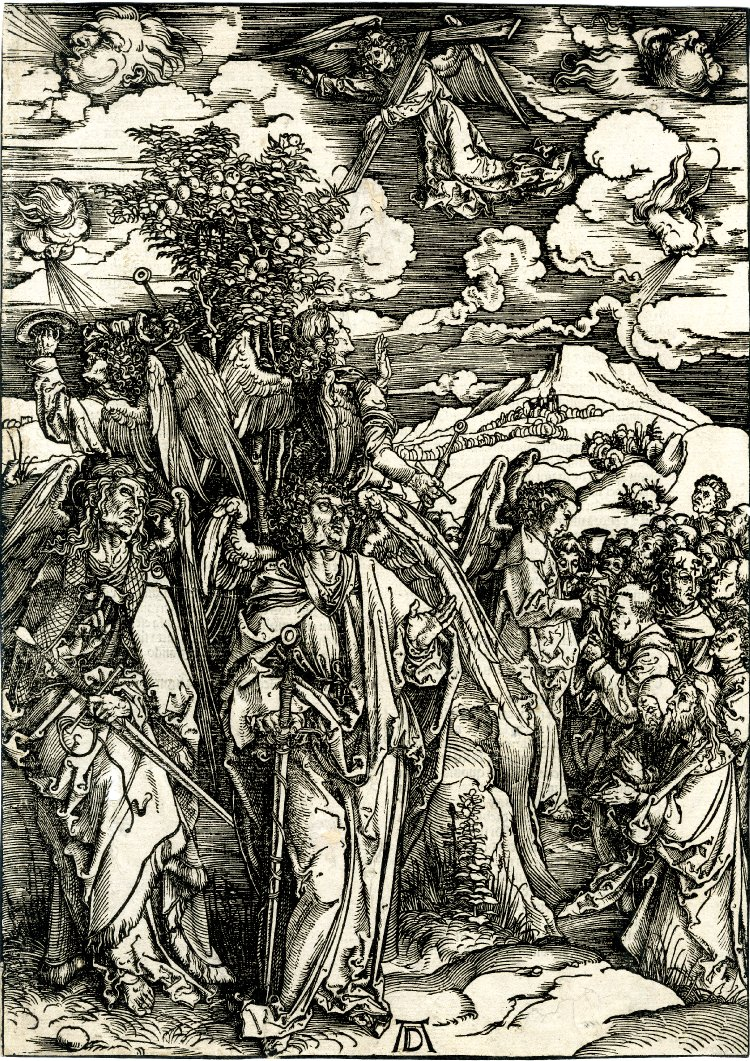
6. Four angels holding back the winds, and the marking of the elect

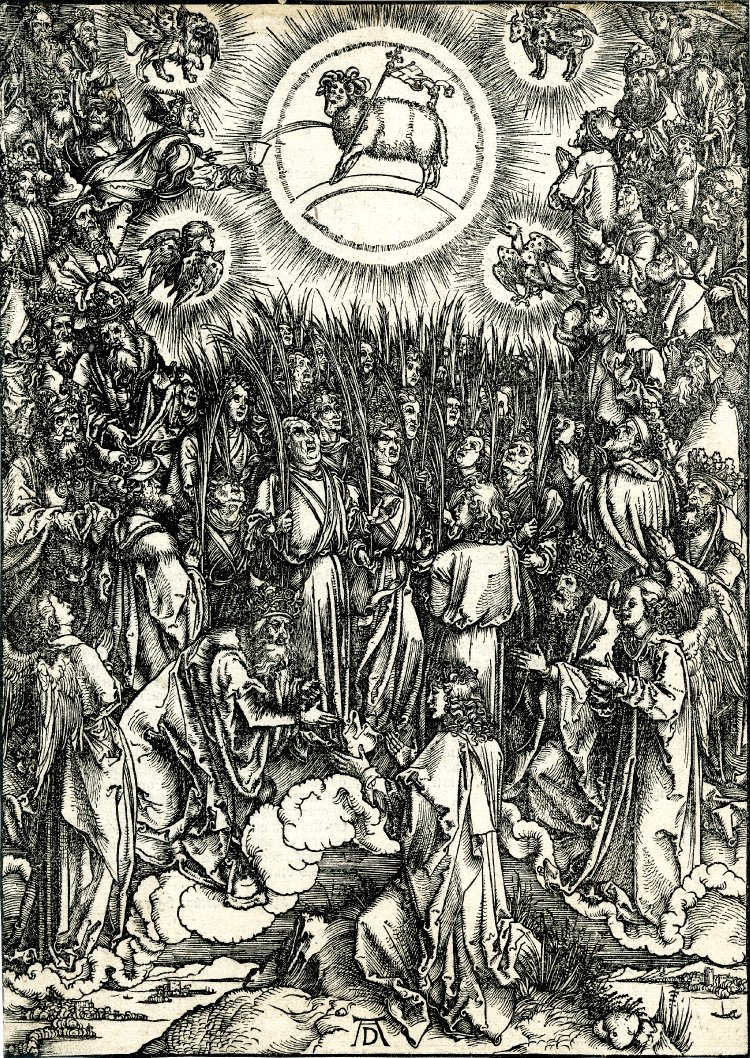
7. The hymn in adoration of the lamb

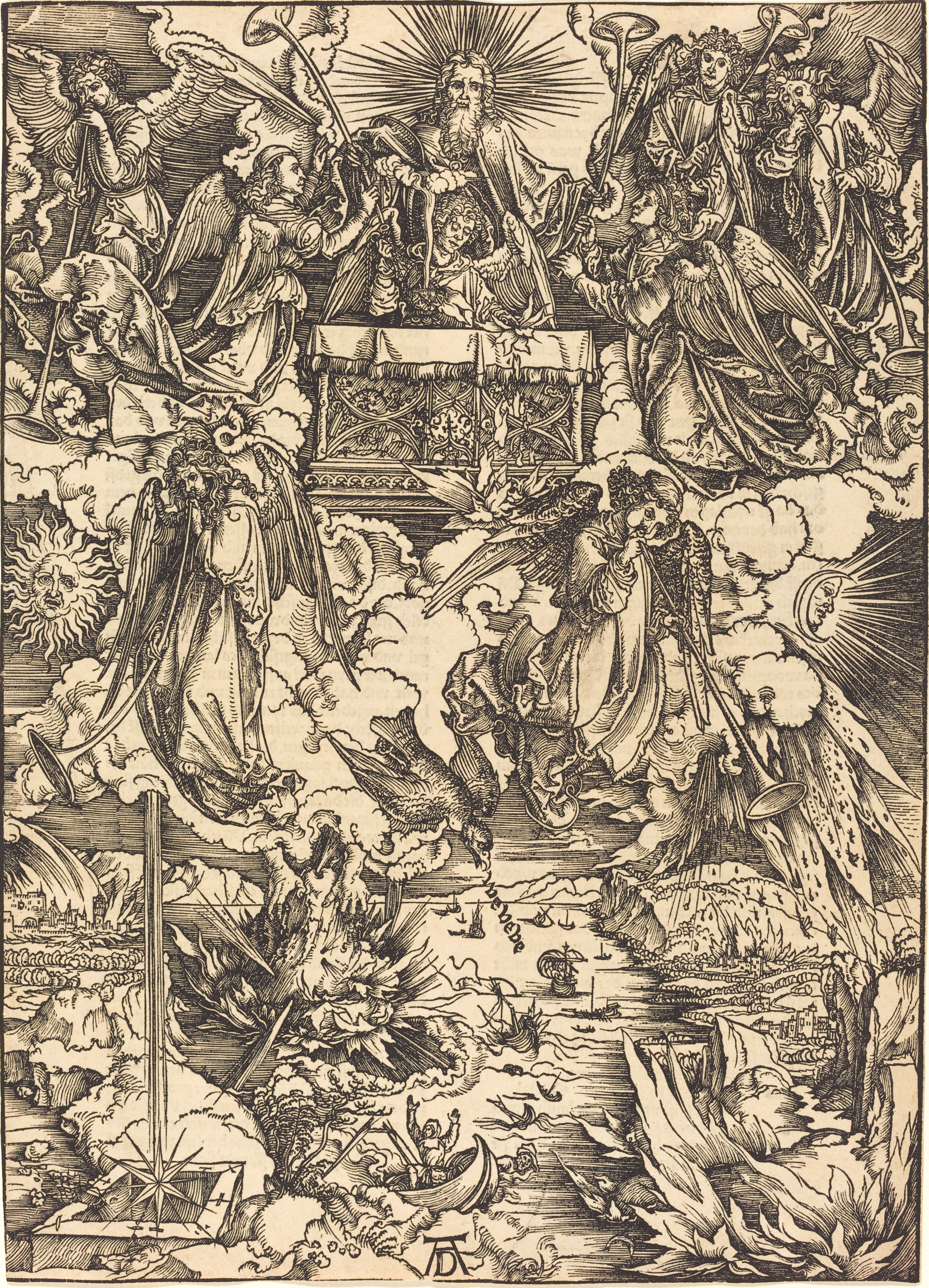
8. The opening of the seventh seal and the eagle crying 'Woe'

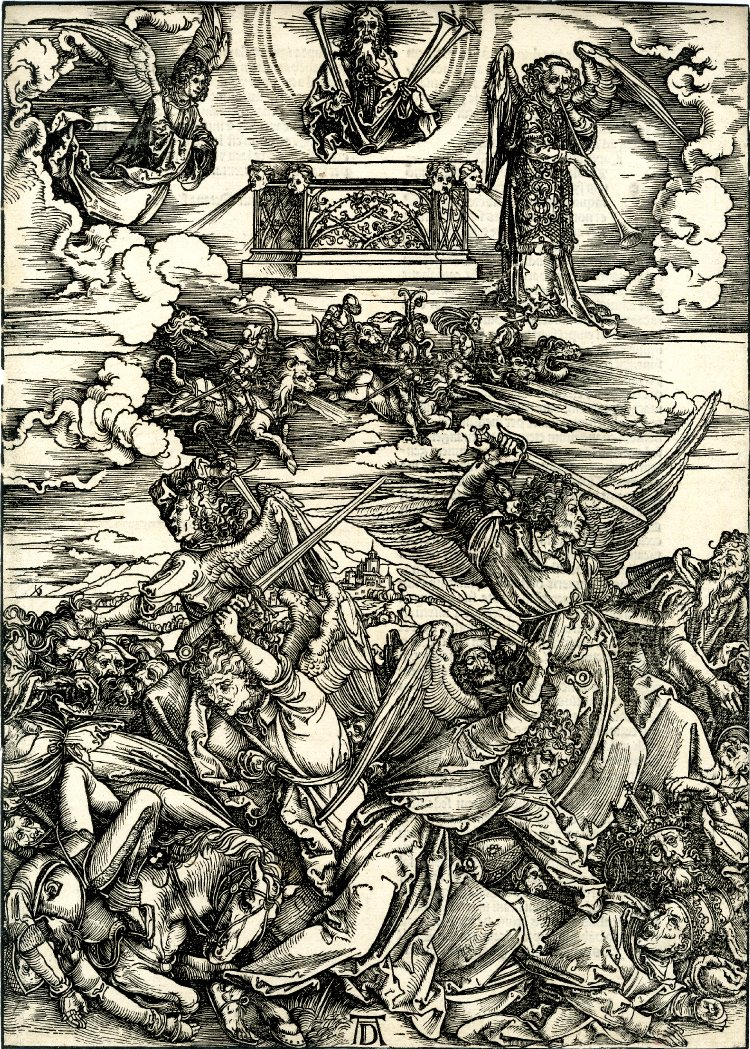
9. The four angels of Death

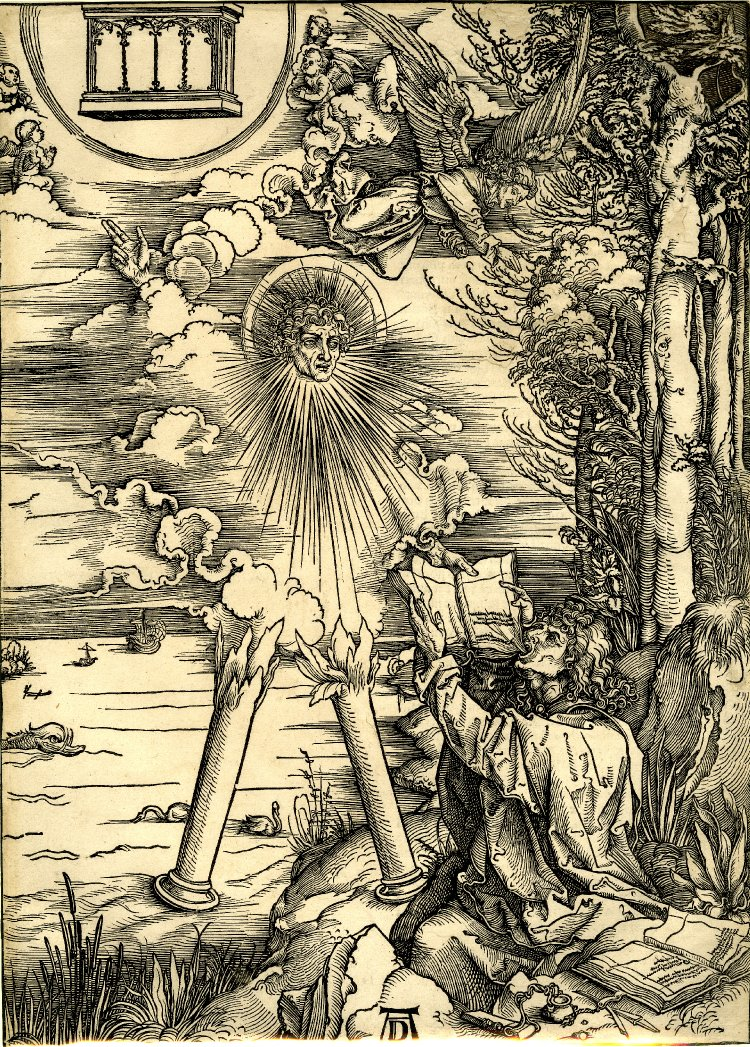
10. St John eating the book

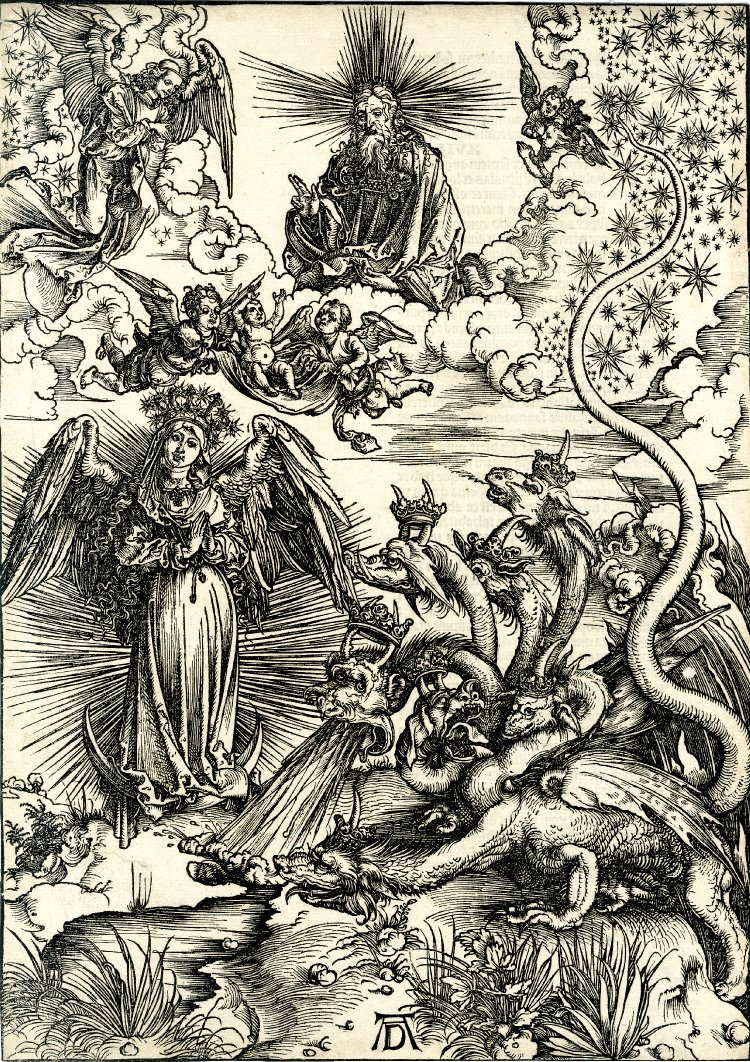
11. The woman of the Apocalypse and the seven-headed dragon

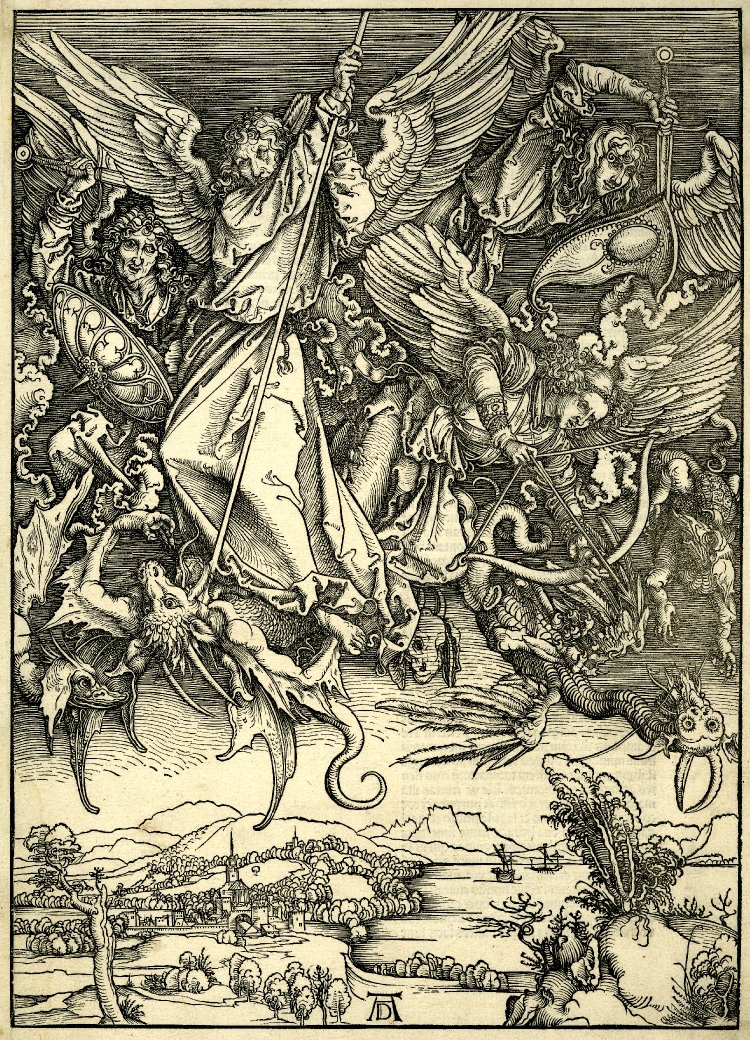
12. Saint Michael Fighting the Dragon

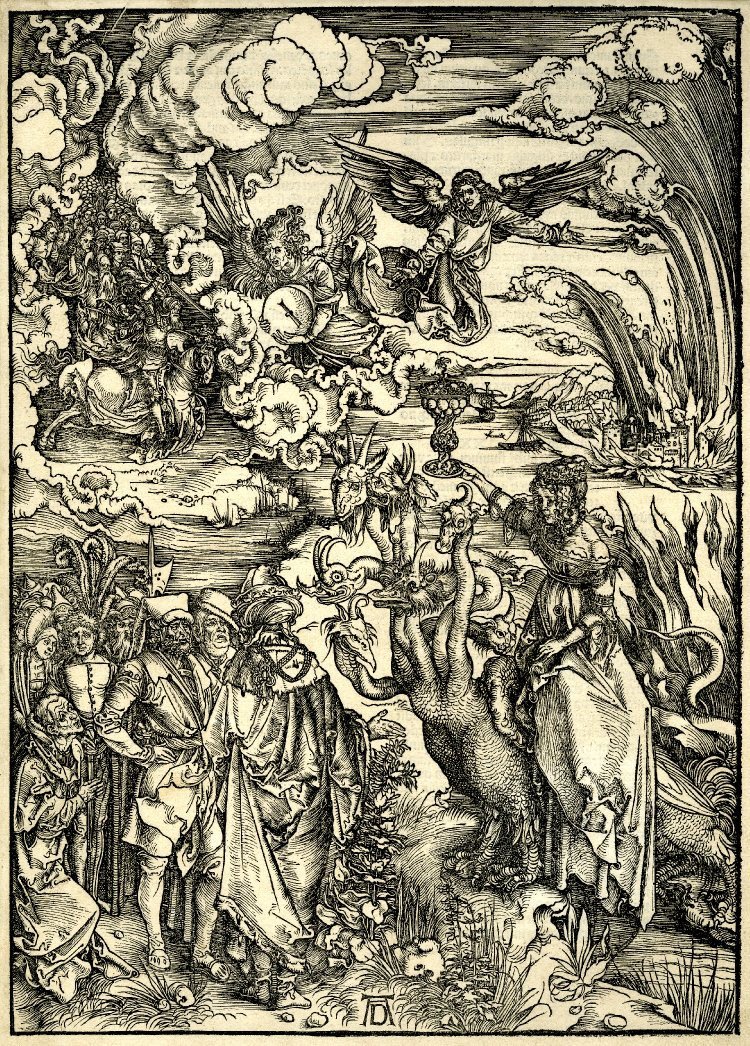
13. The Whore of Babylon

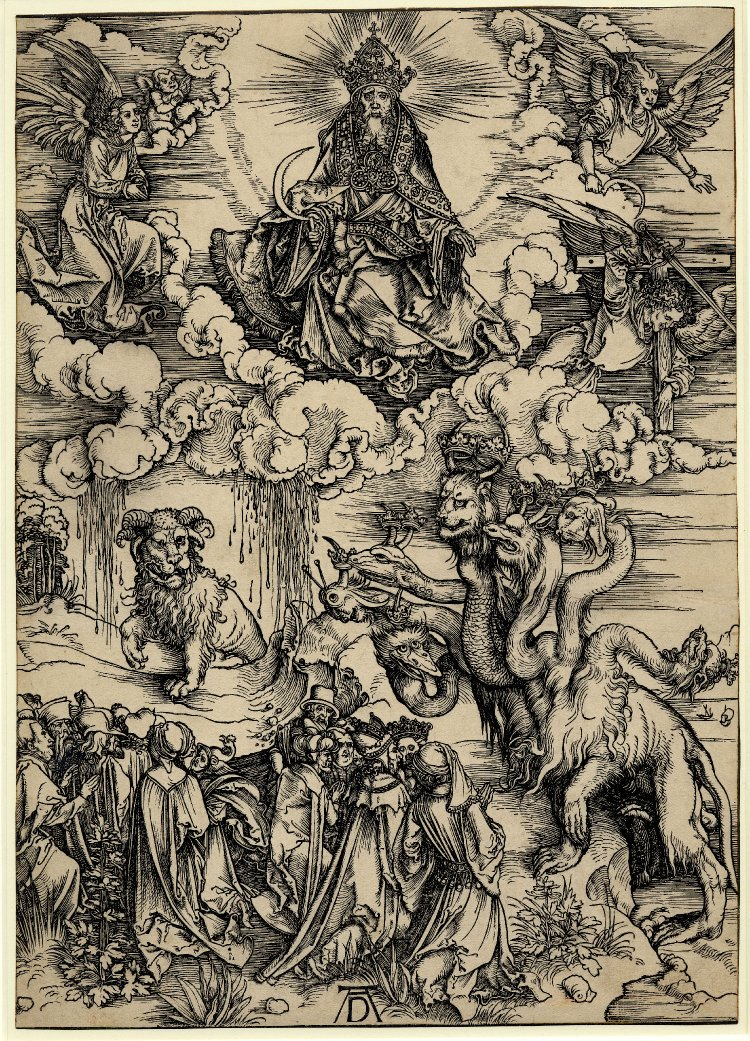
14. The beast with the lamb's horns and the beast with seven heads

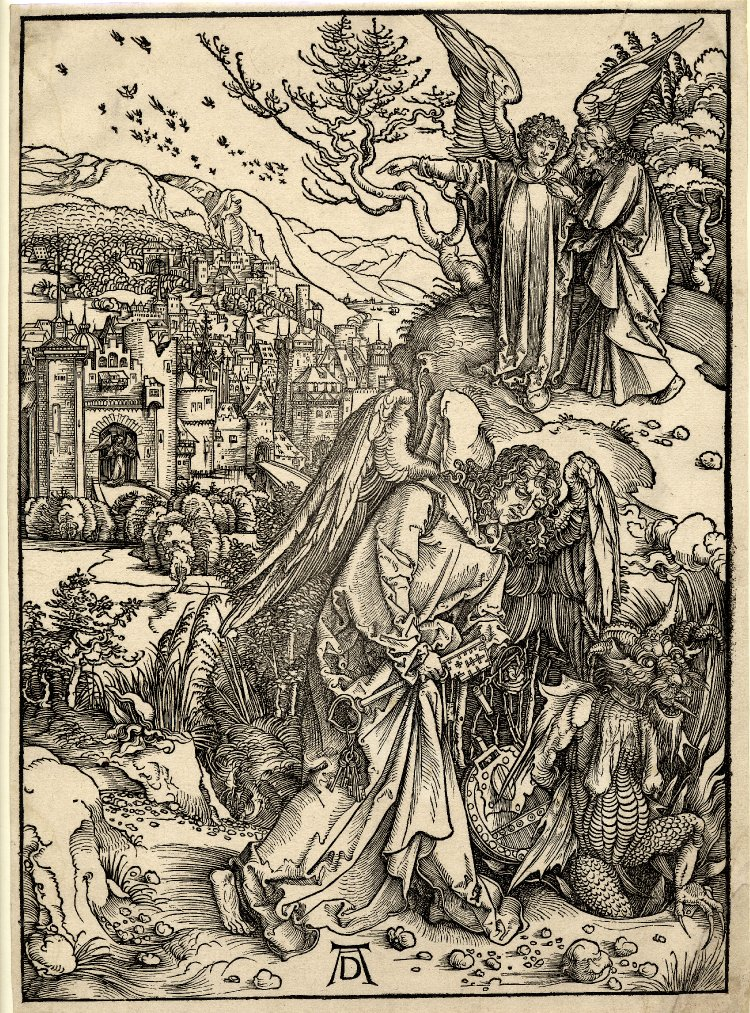
15. The angel with the key of the bottomless pit (Note: The architectural style of New Jerusalem (background left) was influenced by Dürer's hometown of Nuremberg.)

== See also ==
- List of engravings by Albrecht Dürer
- List of woodcuts by Albrecht Dürer

== Bibliography ==
- Ernst Konrad Stahl: Die graphische
- hello
- Darstellung von Naturereignissen, von Luft- und Licht-Phänomenen in Dürers Apokalypse. Ein Beitrag zur Dürer-Forschung und zugleich zur Entwicklungsgeschichte des deutschen Holzschnittes, München 1916, https://doi.org/10.11588/diglit.62425
- Carl Schellenberg: Die Illustrationsprinzipien der Dürer-Apokalypse, in: Der Kunstwanderer. Zeitschrift für alte und neue Kunst, für Kunstmarkt und Sammelwesen, vol. 7, n. 1/2, 1924/1925, pp. 176–178, https://doi.org/10.11588/diglit.25879.60
- Franz Juraschek: Das Rätsel in Dürers Gottesschau. Die Holzschnittapokalypse und Nikolaus von Cues, Salzburg 1955.
- Eberhard Marx: Die Herkunft von einigen Bildmotiven in Dürers Apokalypse, in: Georg Rohde/Ottfried Neubecker/Hans-Herbert Möller/Barbara Lipperheide/Eberhard Marx/Hans Schröter (eds.): Edwin Redslob zum 70. Geburtstag. Eine Festgabe, Berlin 1955, pp. 301–310.
- Karl Arndt: Dürers Apokalypse. Versuche zur Interpretation, Göttingen 1956.
- Rudolf Chadraba: Duerers Apokalypse. Eine ikonologische Deutung, Prague 1964.
- Rangsook Yoon: Distribution and Sales of Dürer's Apocalypse, in: Gutenberg-Jahrbuch, vol. 85, 2010, pp. 138–142.
- Martin Büchsel: Die Gewalt der Gerechten. Die schreienden Engel in Dürers Apokalypse-Illustrationen, in: Münchner Jahrbuch der Bildenden Kunst, 3. F., vol. LXXII, 2021, pp. 35–50.
