= Horror vacui (art) =

Latin phrase which means "fear of empty space"

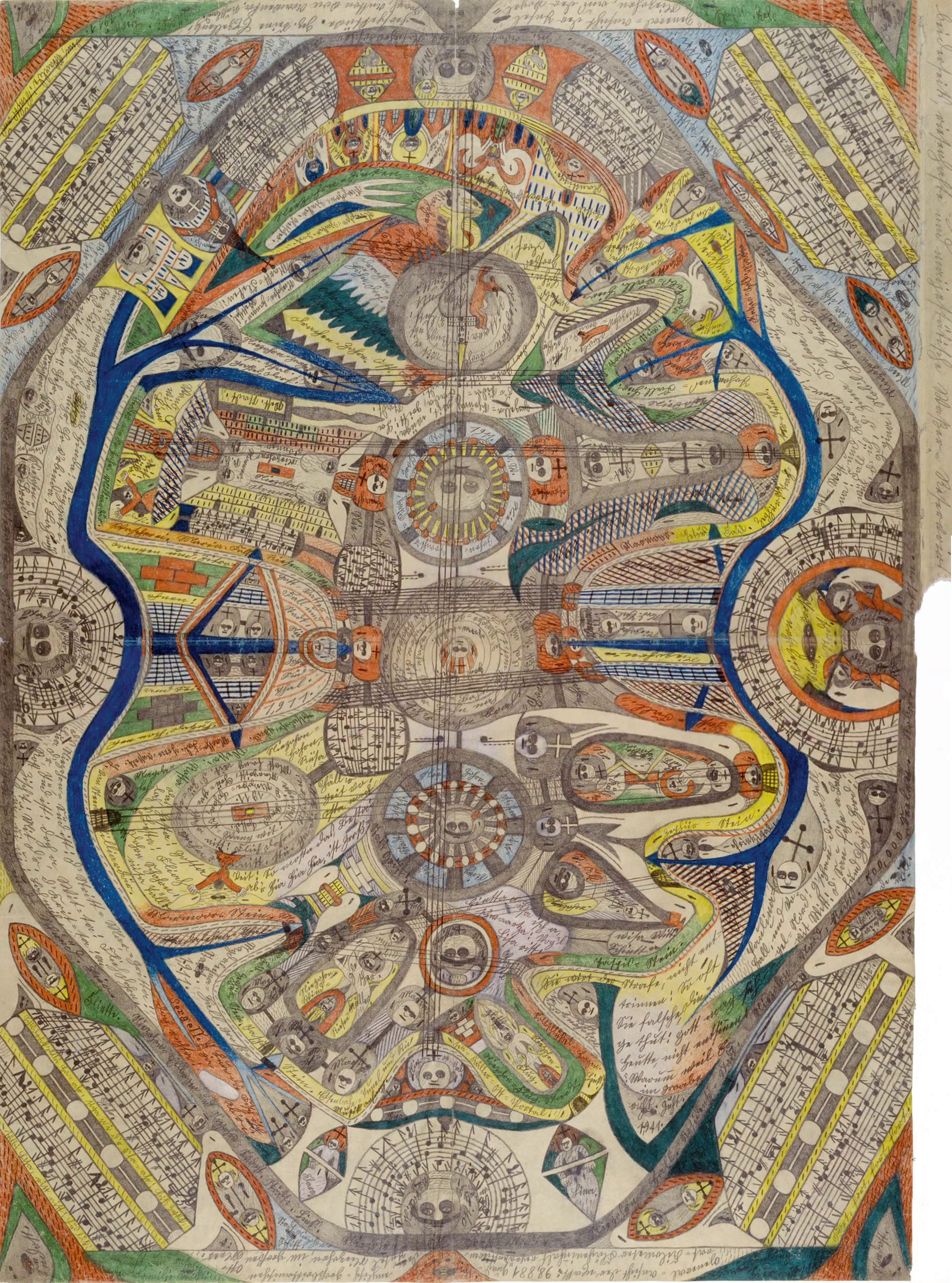
The art of Swiss outsider artist Adolf Wölfli contains spaces densely filled with ornamentation, writing and musical notation.

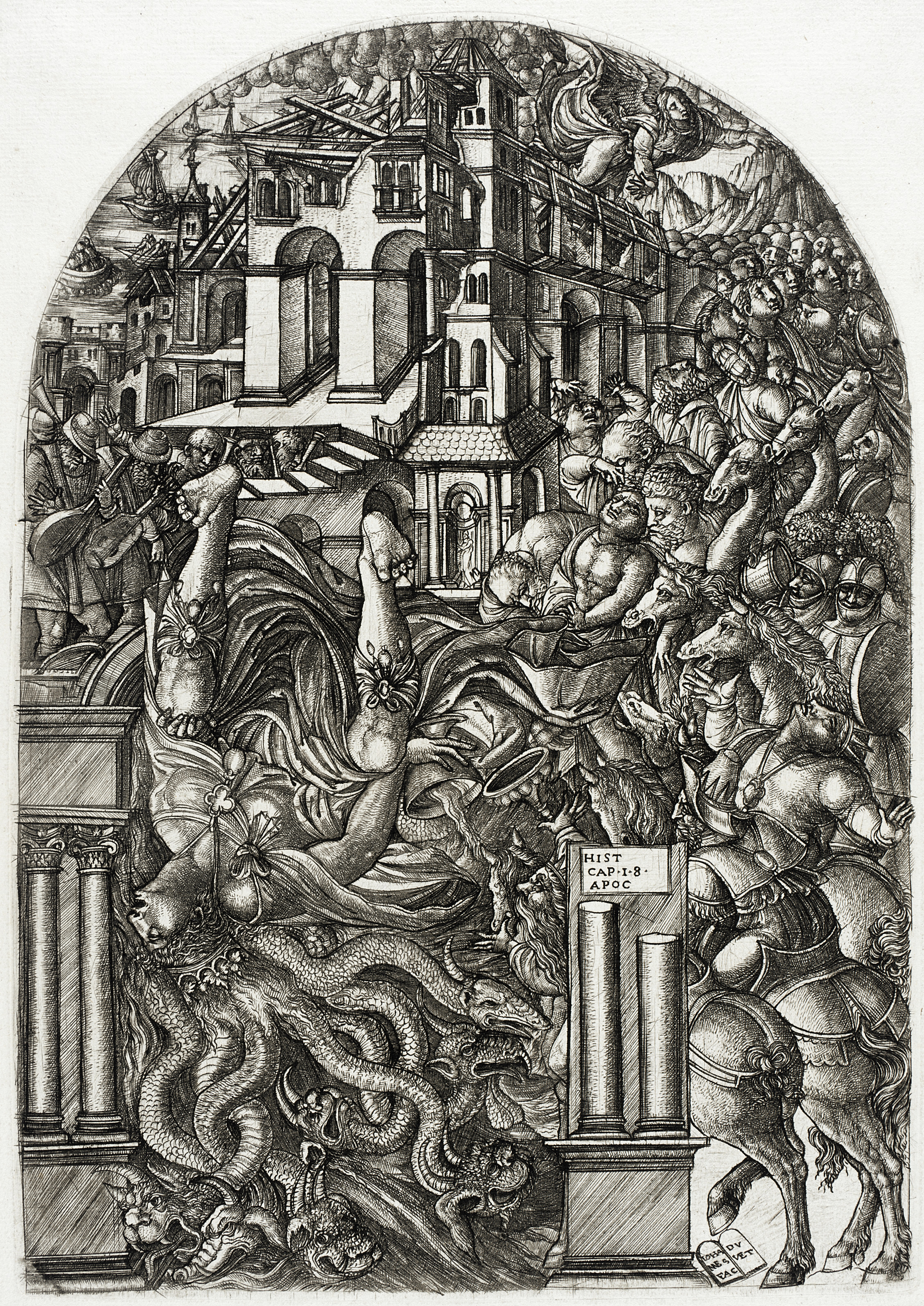
The Fall of Babylon, engraving by Jean Duvet from the Apocalypse series, circa 1555, plate size: 11 7/8 in × 8 3/8 in (300 mm × 210 mm)

In visual art, horror vacui (Latin for 'fear of empty space'; UK: /ˌhɒrə ˈvækjuaɪ/; US: /- ˈvɑːk-/), or kenophobia (Greek for 'fear of the empty'), is a phenomenon in which the entire surface of a space or an artwork is filled with detail and content, leaving as little perceived emptiness as possible. It relates to the antiquated physical idea, horror vacui, proposed by Aristotle who held that "nature abhors an empty space".

== Origins ==
Italian art critic and scholar Mario Praz used this term to describe the excessive use of ornament in design during the Victorian age. Other examples of horror vacui can be seen in the densely decorated carpet pages of Insular illuminated manuscripts, where intricate patterns and interwoven symbols may have served "apotropaic as well as decorative functions." The interest in meticulously filling empty spaces is also reflected in Arabesque decoration in Islamic art from ancient times to present. The art historian Ernst Gombrich theorized that such highly ornamented patterns can function like a picture frame for sacred images and spaces: "The richer the elements of the frame, the more the centre will gain in dignity".

Another example comes from ancient Greece during the Geometric Age (1100–900 BCE), when horror vacui was considered a stylistic element of all art. The mature work of the French Renaissance engraver Jean Duvet consistently exhibits horror vacui.

== Examples ==
Horror vacui is apparent in some styles of postmodern graphic design, including the work of artists like David Carson or Vaughan Oliver, and in the underground comix movement in the work of S. Clay Wilson, Robert Crumb, Robert Williams, and later comic artists such as Mark Beyer. The paintings of Williams, Faris Badwan, Emerson Barrett, Joe Coleman and Todd Schorr are further examples of horror vacui in the modern Lowbrow art movement.

The entheogen-inspired visionary art of certain indigenous peoples, such as the Huichol yarn paintings and the ayahuasca-inspired art of Pablo Amaringo, often exhibits this style, as does the psychedelic art movement of the 1960s counterculture. Sometimes the patterned art in the clothing of indigenous peoples of Middle and South America exhibits horror vacui. For example, the geometric molas of the Guna people and the traditional clothing of the Shipibo-Conibo people.

The artwork in the Where's Wally? series of children's books is a commonly known example of horror vacui, as are many of the small books written or illustrated by the macabre imagination of Edward Gorey.

The Tingatinga painting style of Dar es Salaam in Tanzania is a contemporary example of horror vacui. Other African artists such as Malangatana of Mozambique also fill the canvas in this way.

The arrangement of Ancient Egyptian hieroglyphs suggests an abhorrence of empty space. Signs were repeated or phonetic complements added to prevent gaps.

== In aesthetics ==
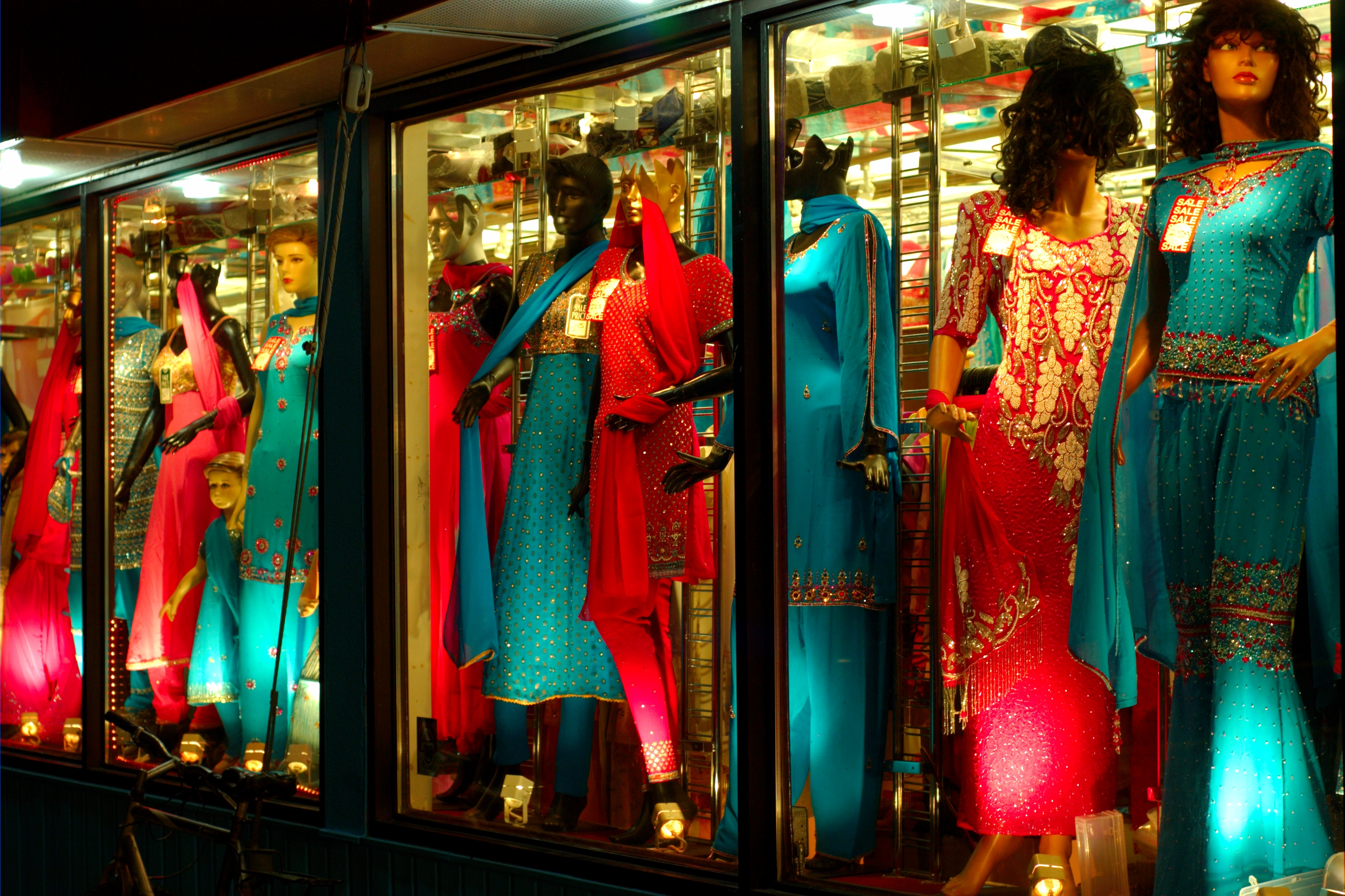
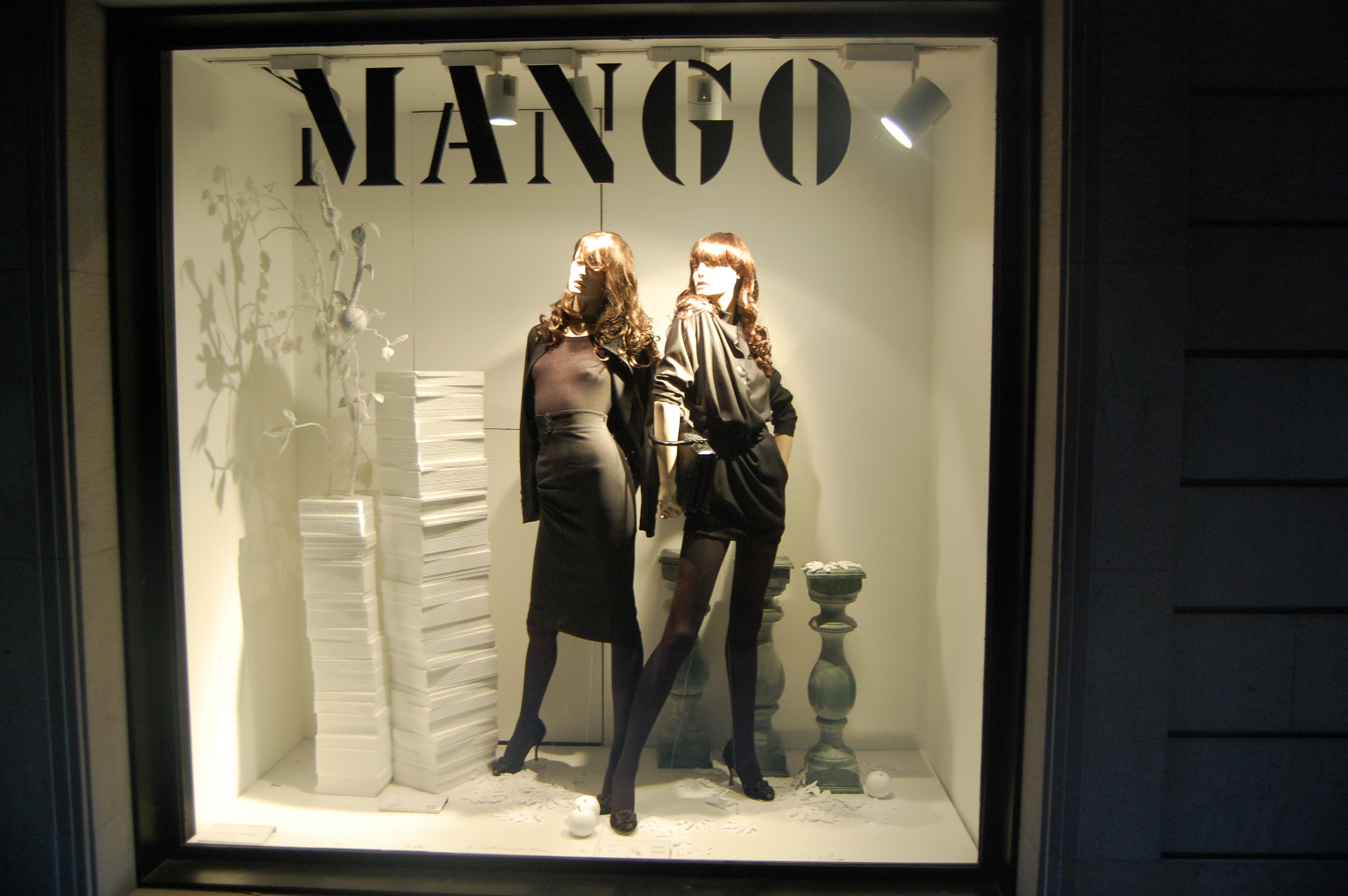
Horror vacui (left) and value perception (right)

There is a relationship between horror vacui and its inverse phenomenon, value perception. Commercial designers favor visual clarity in window displays and advertising in order to appeal to affluent and well-educated consumers, on the premise that understatement and restraint appeals to more affluent and educated audiences.

In a study, clothing stores were surveyed to find patterns and relationship between how efficiently the store's real estate was used and the store's brand prestige; bulk sales shops and chain stores were found to fill their window displays to maximum capacity, effectively exhibiting the principle of horror vacui, while high-end boutiques often used their space sparsely with no price tags. The assumption was that if passersby needed to know the price, they could not afford it.

== See also ==
- Fractal art
- Ma (negative space)
- Maximalism
- Negative space
- Persian carpets
- Type colour
- Wimmelbilderbuch
- White space (visual arts)
- Yin and yang
