= Lotte Brand Philip =

German art historian (1910–1986)

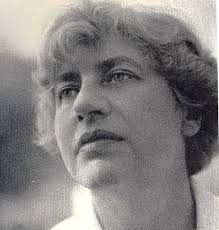
Lotte Brand Philip

Lotte Brand Philip (May 27, 1910 – May 2, 1986) was a German art historian, professor and expert on Netherlandish art, one of the most notable and incisive experts on 14th- and 15th-century art to have studied under Erwin Panofsky. Born a Christian of Jewish descent, she resisted state intimidation to leave Germany, only moving to the United States in 1941. She began her new life as a jewelry designer, before establishing a career as an art historian and writer, and taking professorship at a number of universities, including New York University and Queens College, Flushing. During her long career, Brand wrote highly regarded books and monographs on artists such as Jan van Eyck, Albrecht Dürer and Hieronymus Bosch, and in 1980 became emeritus at Queens. Brand Philip died on May 2, 1986, in New York City.

== Early life ==
Lotte Johanna Friederike Brand was born in Altona, Hamburg, Germany, on May 27, 1910, to Friedrich Wilhelm Brand and Anna Majud. She studied at the Technische Hochschule in Munich and at the University of Heidelberg. As a doctoral student at the University of Hamburg, Brand studied under Erwin Panofsky. She wrote her doctoral thesis in 1937 at the University of Freiburg under Kurt Bauch, on the topic of Stefan Lochner's altarpiece Altar of the City Patrons.

== Career ==
Brand, a Christian of Jewish extraction, studied in Munich and Hamburg with a number of Jewish PhD students of art history. During Nazi rule she was advised to leave Germany, but refused and stayed through the first wave of immigration of her family and peers. She was forced out in 1941, and emigrated to the United States, arriving on April 28 aboard the MS Hikawa Maru. Although she held a doctorate in art history, she lacked significant teaching experience and had difficulty acquiring an academic position in the US. She took work as a jewelry designer in Rhode Island and New York, conducting her scholarly research during trips to Germany after the war. She married Herbert Leopold Wolfgang Philip (1909 Hamburg – 1988 Queens) around 1942; and thereafter published under the name Lotte Brand Philip.

Her monograph on Hieronymus Bosch was published by Abrams Books in 1955. William S. Heckscher, who had studied under Panofsky with her and now taught at the Institute of Art History at Utrecht, arranged for Brand Philip to tour the Netherlands as a guest lecturer in 1957. She also lectured at Bryn Mawr College and at the New School for Social Research in New York in 1959–1960. She returned to academia full-time in 1960 when H. W. Janson, another classmate from her Panofsky days, offered her a position at New York University. The following year she accepted a professorship at Queens College, where she taught art history for the next 25 years.

In February 1966 she lectured at the National Gallery of Art on her paper "The Peddler by Hieronymus Bosch: A Study in Detection". Brand Philip was selected to give the 1967–1968 Benjamin West Memorial Lecture on art history at Swarthmore College, on the topic "The Ghent Altarpiece: A New Solution to an Old Problem".

=== Ghent Altarpiece ===
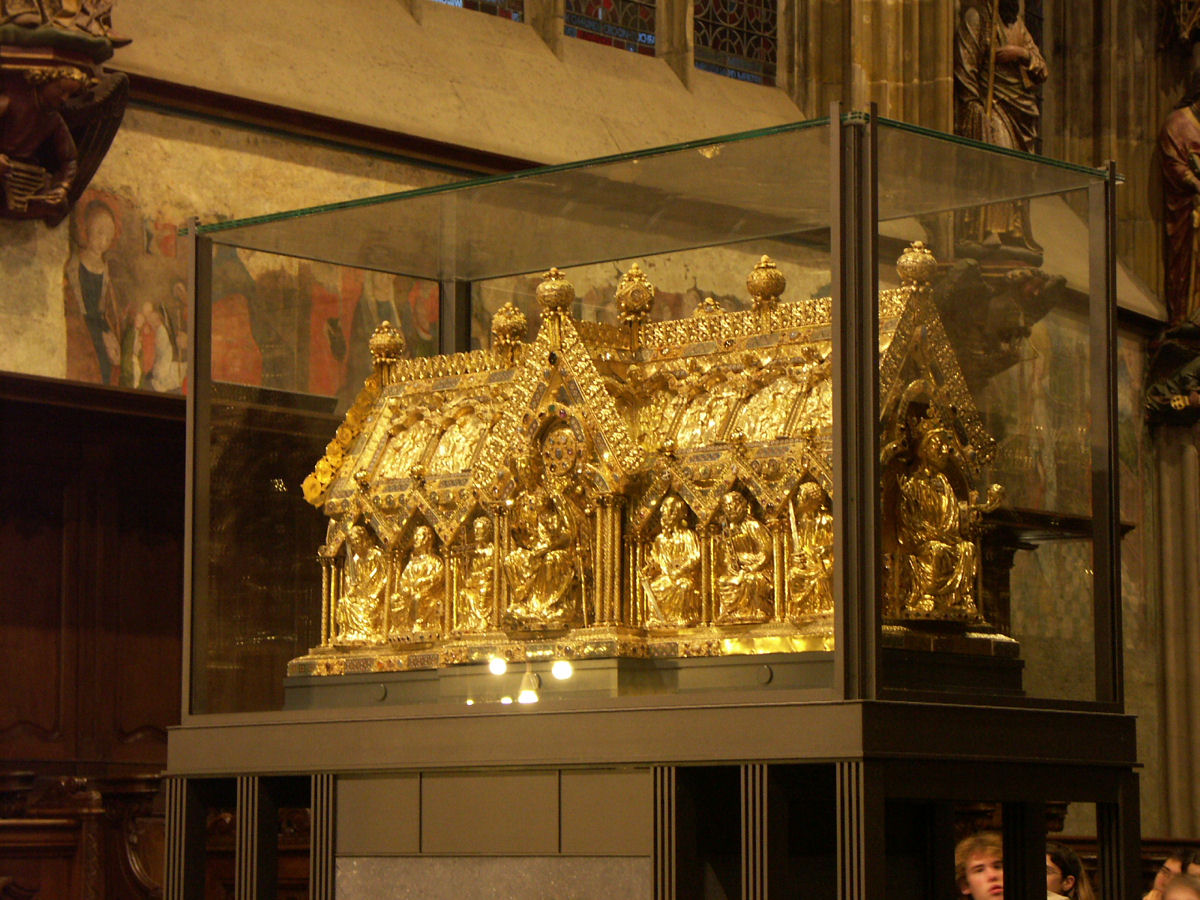
The reliquary of Mary at Aachen Cathedral. Its shape and lines inspired Brand Philip to imagine the Ghent Altarpiece panels as the centerpiece of a soaring, house-shaped structure.

In 1932 Brand Philip attended a Panofsky lecture on the Ghent Altarpiece. Panofsky, an acknowledged expert in early Netherlandish art and symbolism, addressed several uncertainties including the curious variations in scale of the figures, the lack of a unified religious message and the unclear attribution of the work between the van Eyck brothers. (Note: An inscription discovered in 1832 on one panel's frame had been translated "The painter Hubert van Eyck, greater than whom no one was found, began [this work], and Jan, his brother, second in art" completed it". Brand Philip hypothesized that 'painter' (pictor) was actually 'sculptor' (fictor), that Hubert had made the sculptural framework, and that 'second in art' was not a judgement of Jan's ability but rather intended to denote that Jan began the paintings after Hubert's framework was finished. See Swan, pp. 36, 39.) Panofsky was of the opinion that the panels had originally been intended for three separate works of art, and that after Hubert's death, they were hastily finished by Jan and combined into a single piece.

Brand Philip felt there was another explanation, but inspiration did not strike until some 30 years later. During a walk down Madison Avenue, a chance encounter with an image of the large, house-shaped reliquary of Mary at Aachen helped her picture a solution. She came to believe that all of the major issues with the Ghent work—scale, unification of message, and attribution—could be explained by the presence of a surrounding framework, elaborately sculpted in the manner of a reliquary or church tabernacle.

In 1964 she identified several contemporary retables that included sculptural frameworks similar to that she envisioned had originally existed for the Ghent piece. She presented her findings at the College Art Association's annual conference in January 1965, and subsequently lectured on the topic at nearly 40 colleges and museums. During a research trip to Ghent and Brussels in 1966, Brand Philip discovered an 1829 painting by Pierre-François de Noter which depicted the Ghent Altarpiece panels in place beneath a large sculptured stone canopy very similar to that which she had envisioned. Brand Philip believed that the stone canopy was a remnant which had survived to de Noter's time, and felt this supported her theory of a grand, unifying framework. (Note: The rest of the framework, she theorized, had likely been a victim of iconoclasts during the Beeldenstorm. The panels were removed to safety in 1566 just before rioters destroyed many ecclesiastical works and structures throughout Ghent.) She published her research in The Ghent Altarpiece and the Art of Jan van Eyck in 1971.

=== Portrait Diptych of Dürer's Parents ===
In the 1970s Brand Philip tackled questions surrounding Albrecht Dürer the Elder with a Rosary, a painting by Albrecht Dürer in the Uffizi Gallery in Florence. The portrait of the artist's father was recorded in several art inventories alongside a portrait of his mother Barbara Holper and the two were presumed to have originally formed a diptych, but the paintings had become separated sometime between 1588 and 1628, and the location of Barbara's portrait was unknown. (Note: The portrait of Albrecht Dürer the Elder was painted in early 1490. After the painter's death in 1528, the painting was kept by first his brother, and then his brother's widow, before passing into the private collection of Willibald Imhoff, the grandson of Dürer's great friend Willibald Pirckheimer. Formal inventories of Imhoff's collection in 1573–1574, 1580, and 1588 listed the father's portrait as well as a portrait of Dürer's mother; the two were presumed by scholars to have formed a diptych. The next surviving Imhoff inventory, that of 1628, does not list the father's portrait, which may have been sold to Rudolf II of Austria in the interim. Dürer's mother's portrait is listed in the 1628 inventory, and in an account book held by Hans Heironymus Imhoff (1633–1658), but subsequently disappears from records. Hutchison (p. 209) confirms that the mother's portrait has been "considered lost since the seventeenth century.") Dürer expert Matthias Mende described this as "among the most severe losses in the Dürer oeuvre".

Brand Philip recalled seeing a portrait of a married woman which she had strongly felt was by Dürer. The painting, held by the Germanisches Nationalmuseum in Nuremberg under the name Unknown Woman in a Coif, had variously been attributed to Master W. B., a "Nuremberg painter, circle of Wolgemut" (Dürer's mentor), and Master of the Salem Altarpiece, but was at that time unattributed. Brand Philip observed that the Nuremberg painting bore a strong compositional likeness to the father's portrait: they were of similar size (Note: The Nuremberg portrait was about 3 cm smaller, but had clearly been trimmed on the left side.) and color scheme, and the sitters were painted against a green background in the same prayerful position, each holding a rosary. A comparison with Portrait of the Artist's Mother at the Age of 63—in which an inscription clearly identifies the subject as Dürer's mother Barbara Holper—seemed to bear out her theory, with the two women showing a strong resemblance. Brand Philip's identification was confirmed in 1977 by Dürer scholar Fedja Anzelewsky, who found that the reverse side of both the Nuremberg and Florence portraits showed patterns of dark clouds and the faded mark "No. 19", which matched the inventory number of the presumed diptych from the 1573 and 1580 inventories. Brand Philip's findings were published in the 1978–1979 issue of Simiolus: Netherlands Quarterly for the History of Art in a paper titled "The Portrait Diptych of Dürer's Parents." Her identification of the Nuremberg portrait as the missing diptych image of Barbara Holper was not universally accepted for some time, but has been borne out by infrared examination of the paintings in 2012. The portraits were reunited in the Germanisches Nationalmuseum's 2012 exhibition "The Early Dürer".

== Selected works ==
- 1938. "Stephan Lochners Hochaltar von St. Katharinen zu Köln." University of Freiburg.
- 1953. Heironymus Bosch. Abrams Art Books. New York: Harry N. Abrams. (1956: Portfolio edition, 1970: Expanded edition)
- 1955. "The Prado 'Epiphany' by Jerome Bosch." Art Bulletin, XXXV
- 1958. "The Peddler by Hieronymus Bosch, a Study in Detection." Nederlands Kunsthistorisch Jaarboek 9, p. 1–81
- 1959. "Eine kölnische Kreuzigung im Historischen Museum Basel." Wallraf-Richartz Jahrbuch, XXI, p. 223–226
- 1967. "Raum und Zeit in der Verkündigung des Genter Altares." Wallraf-Richartz Jahrbuch, XXIX, p. 62–104
- 1971. The Ghent Altarpiece and the Art of Jan van Eyck. Princeton, NJ: Princeton University Press
- 1978–1979 with Fedja Anzelewsky. "The Portrait Diptych of Dürer's Parents." Simiolus: Netherlands Quarterly for the History of Art, Vol. 10, No. 1, p. 5–18
- 1981. "Das neu entdeckte Bildnis von Dürers Mutter." Renaissance Vorträge (Stadt Nürnberg Stadtgeschichtliche Museen), VII, p. 3–33.

== Personal life ==
In 1970, she married Otto H. Förster, director of the Wallraf-Richartz Museum in Cologne. Brand Philip died of a stroke in New York City on May 2, 1986.

== Recognition ==
Brand Philip was an acknowledged expert in the fields of Gothic and Renaissance art in northern Europe. She received fellowship awards from the Fulbright Program, Bollinger, the National Endowment for the Humanities, the American Association of University Women, and the Belgian American Educational Foundation. On the occasion of her 75th birthday, her colleagues celebrated her life and work with a traditional festschrift: the publication of Tribute to Lotte Brand Philip: Art Historian and Detective.
