= Alte Pinakothek (Self-Portrait) =

Photograph by Thomas Struth

Alte Pinakothek (Self-Portrait) is a color photograph by German photographer Thomas Struth, from 2000. It depicts the 1500 Self-Portrait by German Renaissance painter Albrecht Dürer in the wall where it hangs in the Alte Pinakothek, in Munich, Germany, being observed by a viewer, which is the photographer himself. The subtitle of the photograph thus has a double meaning, referring both to Dürer's portrait and to the artists presence. It had a 10 prints edition.

== History and description ==
Struth started a long series dedicated to museums and monuments around the world, with their visitors, in 1989. In this case, unlike most of his work, he pays particularly attention to a specific work of art, while it is under observation by a single viewer, which is Struth himself. Its the only presence of the photographer in the entire series, even if he appears here anonymously and only partially visible.

Dürer's Self-Portrait is the focus of the composition, in a similar way to the visitors in his Museum Photographs series, while the single viewer is relegated to a secondary role. Struth is depicted slightly out of focus, looking from the right side, while the main focus is the painting. It seems like a tribute to the self-portrait of a leading name in the history of German art. Struth, symbolically assumes a secondary place, while he lets the painting speak by itself, unlike in most of the series.

Struth explained his purpose in doing the photograph: "It’s a kind of playful game with the meaning of self-portrait. In this case, it’s a conversation — not only with myself, but with the world of art, and an artist who, like me, is German. Of course, you can’t say the Germany of the 1500s is the same Germany as it is today — but I felt that we came from the same cultural foundation; it was a sort of meeting of spirits."

Ann Goldstein stated: "By collapsing his self-portrait into a museum photograph, he makes a powerful statement about his approach to viewing and being viewed, ultimately focusing on the relationship of the artist to his work. As a self-portrait, it is a portrait of self-reflection.”

== Art market ==
A print of the photograph was sold by $810.128 at Phillips on 28 February 2008.

== Public collections ==
There are prints of this photograph at the Pinakothek der Moderne, Munich, the Museo Nacional Centro de Arte Reina Sofía, in Madrid, the National Gallery of Art, in Washington, D.C., and at the Vancouver Art Gallery.
