= Self-Portrait (Dürer, Madrid) =

1498 painting by Albrecht Dürer

- Self-portrait by Albrecht Dürer (1471-1528)
- Artist: Albrecht Dürer
- Year: 1498
- Medium: oil on panel
- Dimensions: 52 cm × 41 cm (20 in × 16 in)
- Location: Museo del Prado, Madrid

Self-portrait (or Self-portrait at 26) is the second of Albrecht Dürer's three painted self-portraits and was executed in oil on wood panel in 1498, after his first trip to Italy. In the depiction, Dürer elevates himself to the social position he believed suited to an artist of his ability. He presents himself in half length, under an arch, turned towards the viewer. He bears an arrogant expression, betraying the assured self-confidence of a young artist at the height of his ability. His presence dominates the pictorial space, from his hat, which almost reaches the top of the canvas, to his arm positioned on the lower ledge, where he rests his fingers enclosed in fine, rich gloves.

Until some time in the 17th century the painting was hung with and kept as a companion piece with Portrait of Dürer's Father at 70; in 1636 the two paintings were gifted as a pair to Charles I of England by the city of Nuremberg, and in 1654 this work was acquired by Philip IV of Spain. Today it is in the Museo del Prado in Madrid.

== Description ==
Dürer is depicted in front of an open window before a flat landscape containing a lake and distant snow-capped mountains. The landscape may represent either the memory of his recent travels abroad or his inner mental state. Light spills from the window, falling along his head to highlight both his delicate skin tones and long blond hair. Dürer is dressed with effeminate grace in flamboyant, extravagant clothes showing the influence of Italian fashion. His low-necked shirt or chemise is of fine linen, gathered and trimmed with a band of gold braid or embroidery, and worn under an open-fronted doublet and a cloak tied over one shoulder. His white jacket has black lining under a pleated white shirt, the horizontals of which match the verticals of his headdress. His fingers are crossed, hidden inside silk gloves, an unusual pose for Dürer's early career; he always paid close attention in detailing the hands of his sitters, who are usually holding an object; examples include a pillow, rosary, sheet of paper and flower.

Dürer is presented as almost seductive, with a rakish patterned hat placed over long, almost girlishly curled blond locks of hair under a draped pointed hat with a tassel. He looks out at the viewer with a cool ironic stare.

== Interpretation ==
Art historian Marcel Brion believes the self-portrait marks a farewell to his irresponsible youth, the acclaim he received during his visit to Italy and his general apprehension as the 15th century came to an end and dark clouds hung over the Germanic states. The middleground of the pleasing flat plain and lake may represent his travels from 1492 to 1497, yet they are shadowed by steep mountainous glaciers; forebodings of what lay in store. In this Brion interprets the artist's state as looking toward his future and past. Dürer's youthful character was enthusiastic, adventurous and inhibited, and after he left his hometown of Nuremberg in 1490 to travel as journeyman painter, he was able to live his early youth with abandon and almost without consequence. By the time this portrait was painted he was back home, and old enough to begin to accept responsibilities.

Dürer had already established himself as a significant artist and was perhaps fearful of losing this status. In the following decade, before he left Italy to return home in October 1506, he wrote to his friend Willibald Pirckheimer, "How I shall freeze after this sun! Here I am a gentleman, at home only a parasite." From these words it might be concluded that his extravagant self-representation may be seen as a front, described by Brion as "the outer skin of a chrysalis, discarded by the future personality fore-shadowed in that gaze when the coming tempest of conflicting emotions burst upon him." In the end, his fears were misplaced; soon after his return to Nuremberg, he was widely hailed and given a social status equivalent to an "Ehrbaren" (wealthy merchant). The following year he published of his edition of the "Apocalypse", and his personal and self-absorbed fear being supplanted by more metaphysical worries.

== Gallery ==
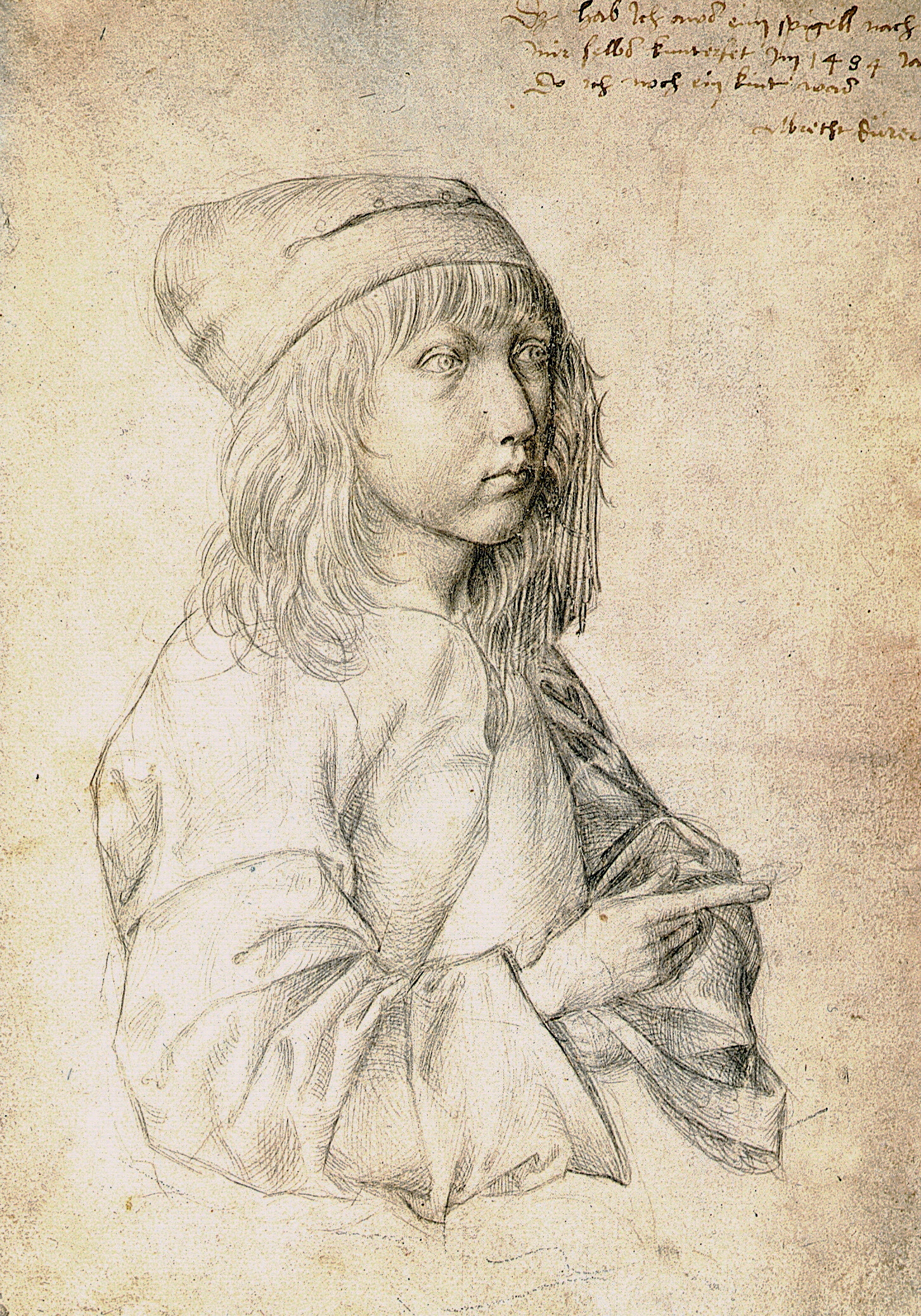
Self-portrait at 13, 1484. Silverpoint drawing, made with the use of a mirror. Vienna.

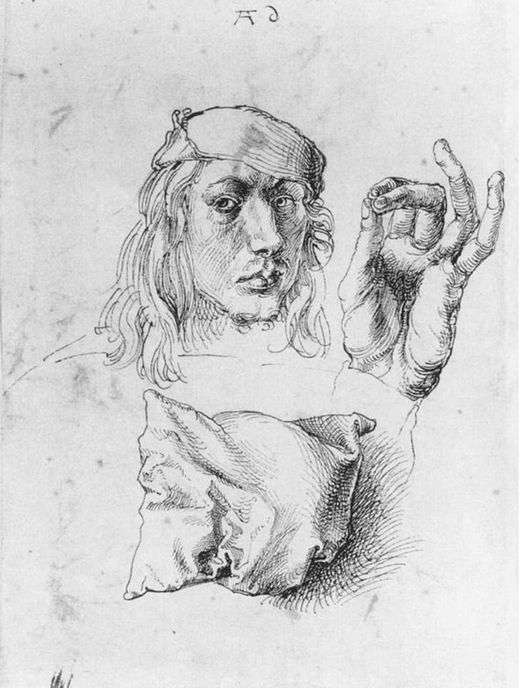
Self-portrait with a pillow, drawing of 1491–92. This study for the 1493 Louvre self-portrait was executed on the reverse of that canvas.

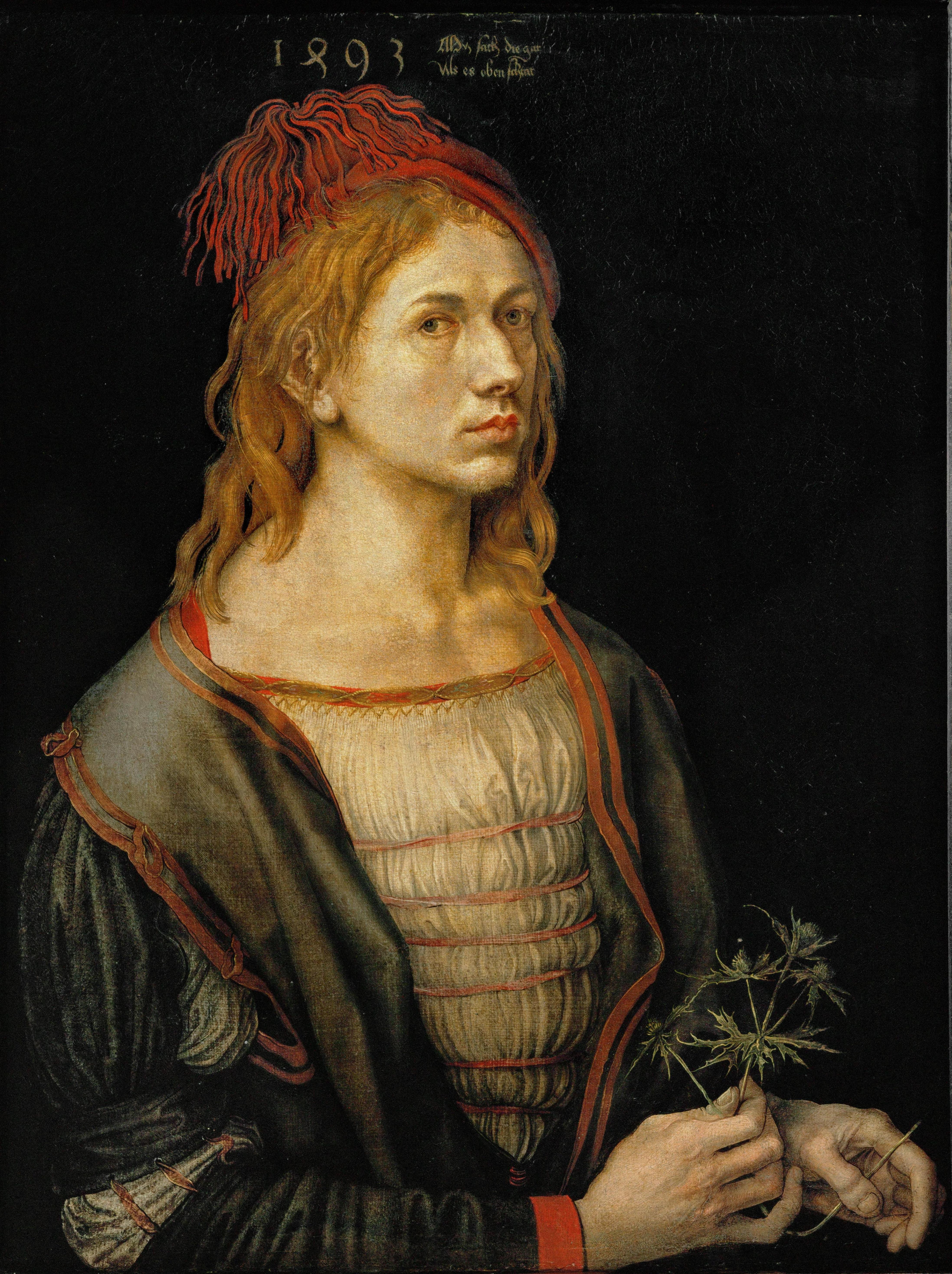
Portrait of the Artist Holding a Thistle. Musée du Louvre, Paris.

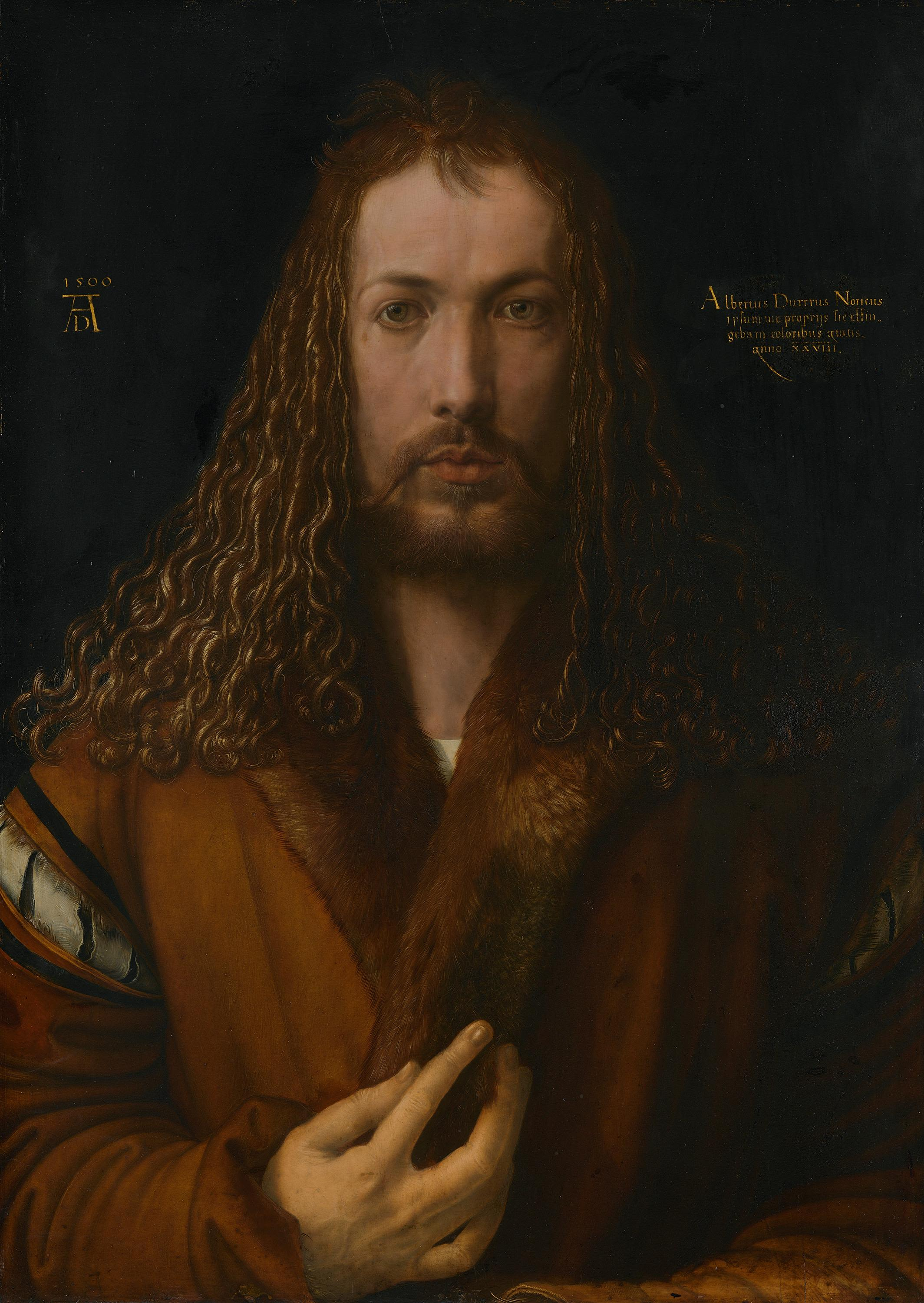
Self-Portrait at 28, 1500. Alte Pinakothek, Munich. Here Dürer presents himself in a portrait heavily invoking the iconography of Christ.

== See also ==
- Self-portraiture
- 100 Great Paintings, 1980 BBC series
