= Portrait of the Artist's Mother at the Age of 63 =

1514 charcoal drawing by Albrecht Dürer

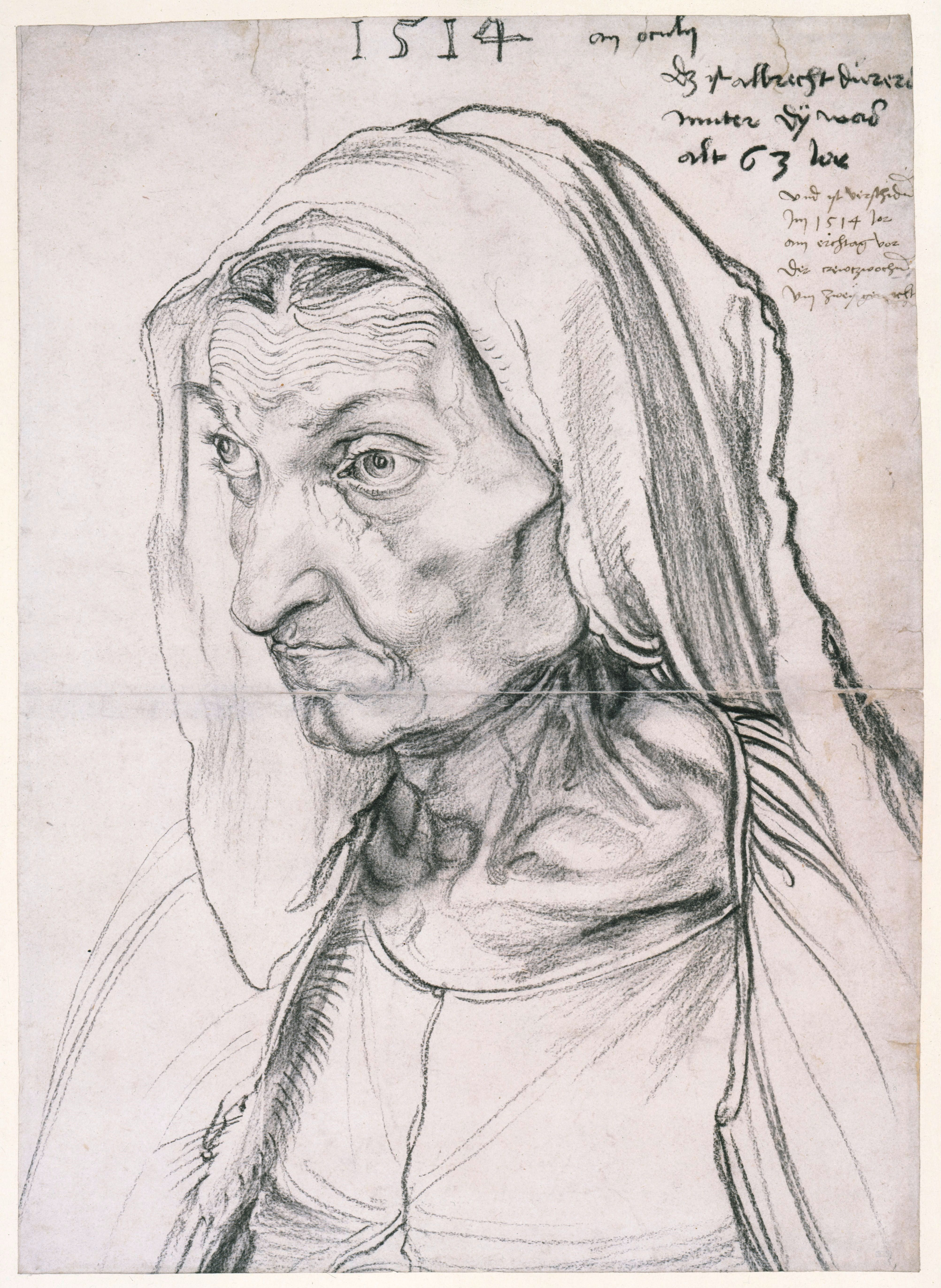
- Portrait of the Artist's Mother at the Age of 63
- Artist: Albrecht Dürer
- Year: 1514
- Medium: charcoal
- Location: Kupferstichkabinett Berlin, Berlin

Portrait of the Artist's Mother at the Age of 63 is the title given to a small March 1514 charcoal drawing by the German printmaker and painter Albrecht Dürer, now in the Kupferstichkabinett museum in Berlin. The portrait is a tender but unflinching physical study of his mother, Barbara Holper (c. 1451–1514), completed two months before she died. Dürer was close to her, and after her death wrote that she had "died hard" and that "I felt so grieved for her that I cannot express it".

In its bleakness, the drawing has been compared to his two great 1514 engravings, Melencolia I and Madonna by the Wall. It is Durer's second portrait of her; his c. 1490 oil on oak panel painting now in Nuremberg is today generally accepted to be either an original or a copy of a lost portrait of her. The drawing was bought in c. 1877 by the Kupferstichkabinett from the Firmin-Didot auction house in Paris during a period of acquisition of over 35 Dürer drawings by the gallery.

== Description and background ==
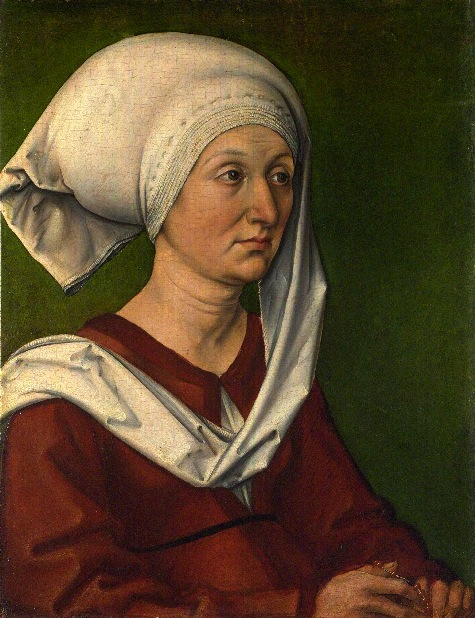
Portrait of Barbara Dürer, née Holper, attributed to Albrecht Dürer, c 1490 when she would have been around 39. Oil on oak panel, 47 cm x 36 cm. Germanisches Nationalmuseum, Nuremberg

Barbara Holper was the daughter of Hieronymus Holper, under whom Dürer's Hungarian father served his apprenticeship as a goldsmith. Hieronymus Holper gave his daughter into marriage when Albrect was 40 and she was 15. Although they appeared to be compatible and well-matched, according to their son they shared difficult lives and many setbacks. They had 18 children together, beginning in 1468 and ending in 1492, only three of whom survived into adulthood. Dürer biographer Jane Hutchinson suggests that Barbara Holper may have been trained and worked as a goldsmith. After her death, her grieving son wrote:

This my pious Mother bore and brought up eighteen children; she often had the plague and many other severe and strange illnesses, and she suffered great poverty, scorn, contempt, mocking words, terrors, and great adversities. Yet she bore no malice. She feared Death much, but she said that to come before God she feared not. Also she died hard, and I marked that she saw something dreadful, for she asked for the holy-water, although, for a long time, she had not spoken. Immediately afterwards her eyes closed over. I saw also how Death smote her two great strokes to the heart, and how she closed mouth and eyes and departed with pain. I repeated to her the prayers. I felt so grieved for her that I cannot express it. God be merciful to her.

Dürer presents his mother with a stark realism that, at first view, might seem cruel or grotesque if he had not left behind a written record of his affection. Her face is emaciated to the point of appearing skeletal, her skin deeply wrinkled and shadowed, her eyes almost detached, and her face seemingly looking up towards a void of despair. Yet his written record about both his parents is deeply compassionate, sympathetic and caring, and it is accepted that the portraits are sensitive studies of the ravages of old age and illness on human flesh. While Dürer forensically detailed the effects of ageing on others, he was less inclined to record its work on his own body; his last full self-portrait was completed in 1500.

== Influence ==
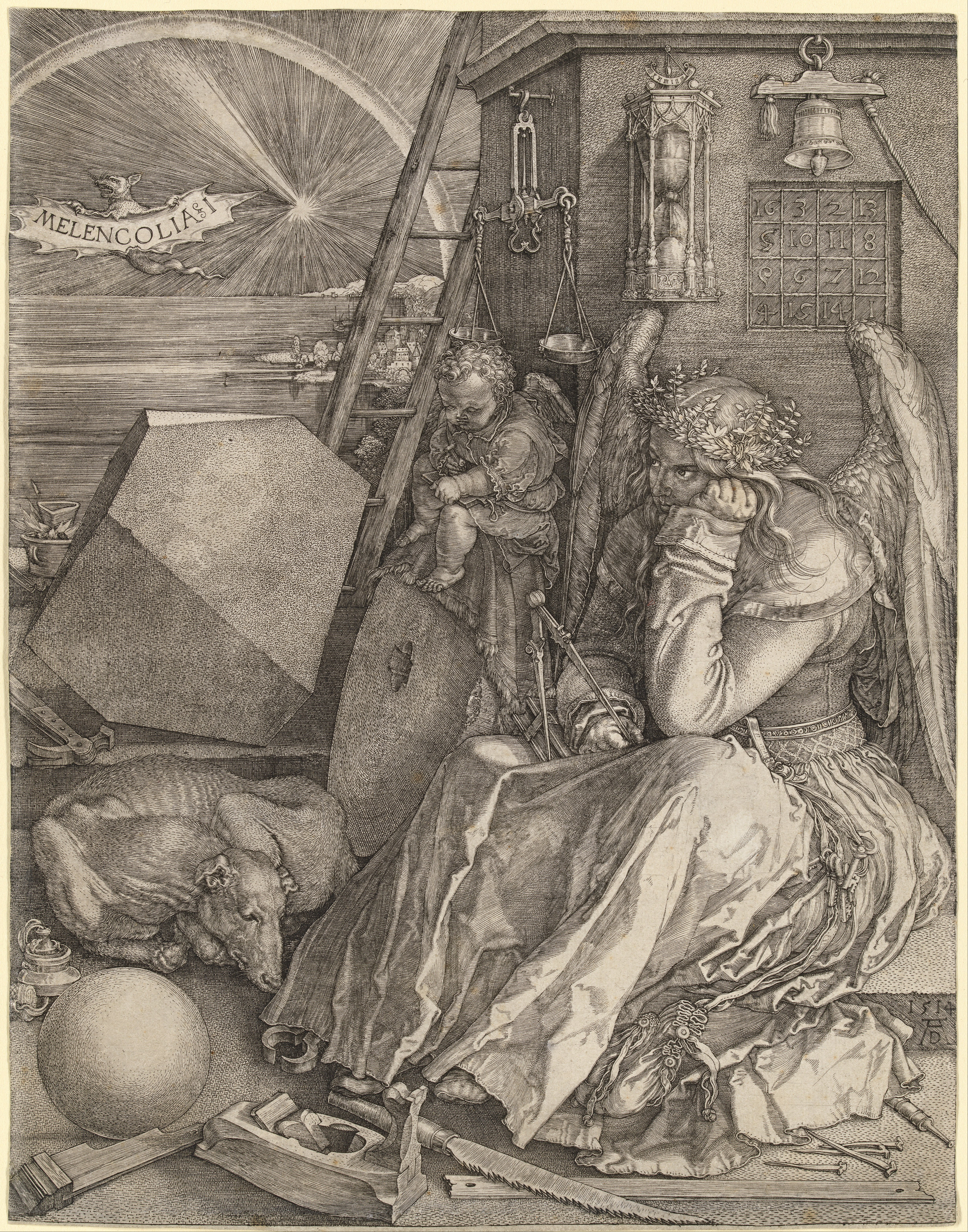
Melencolia I, Albrecht Dürer, engraving, 1514

The art historian Christa Grössinger described the drawing as the "most affecting of all" of Dürer's portraits. David Price wrote of its "rough depiction of her flesh emaciated by old age", and "existential piety in the cast of Barbara Dürer's right eye, which, almost unnaturally, directs her vision heavenward." It is inscribed at the top with the year 1514. Large text to the top right reads, ""Das ist Albrecht Dürers Mutter, die 63 Jahr alt war" (This is Albrecht Dürer's mother, who was 63 years old"), while in smaller lettering just below these Dürer inscribes "und im Jahr 1514 am Dienstag vor Pfingsten, ungefähr zwei Stunden vor Nacht, selig verschieden ist" ("and in the year 1514 on the Tuesday before Whitsun, about two hours before night, died peacefully").

Robert Beverly Hale praised the drawing, particularly the structure of the eye, for its attention to anatomical detail and the clarity with which the orbital cavity is described. Observing that the near eye is spherical in shape, he noted that Dürer "treated the lids as ribbons of flesh" stretched over the eye. The iris of the near eye includes two small highlights side by side, indicating that this was drawn in a room with multiple light sources.

== Sources ==
- Brion, Marcel. Dürer. London: Thames and Hudson, 1960
- Hale, Robert Beverly. Anatomy Lessons from the Great Masters. New York: Watson-Guptill Publications, 1977. ISBN 0-8230-0222-5
- Hutchinson, Jane Campbell. Albrecht Dürer: A Biography. Princeton University Press, 1990. ISBN 0-691-03978-X
- Price, David. Albrecht Dürer's Renaissance: Humanism, Reformation and the Art of Faith. Ann Arbour: University of Michigan Press, 2003. ISBN 0-472-11343-7
- Sturge Moore, Thomas. Albert Dürer. Kessinger Publishing, 2004. ISBN 1-4191-0533-7
- Tatlock, Lynne. Enduring Loss in Early Modern Germany. Brill Academic Publishers, 2010. 116. ISBN 90-04-18454-6
