= Portrait of Dürer's Father at 70 =

1497 painting by Albrecht Dürer

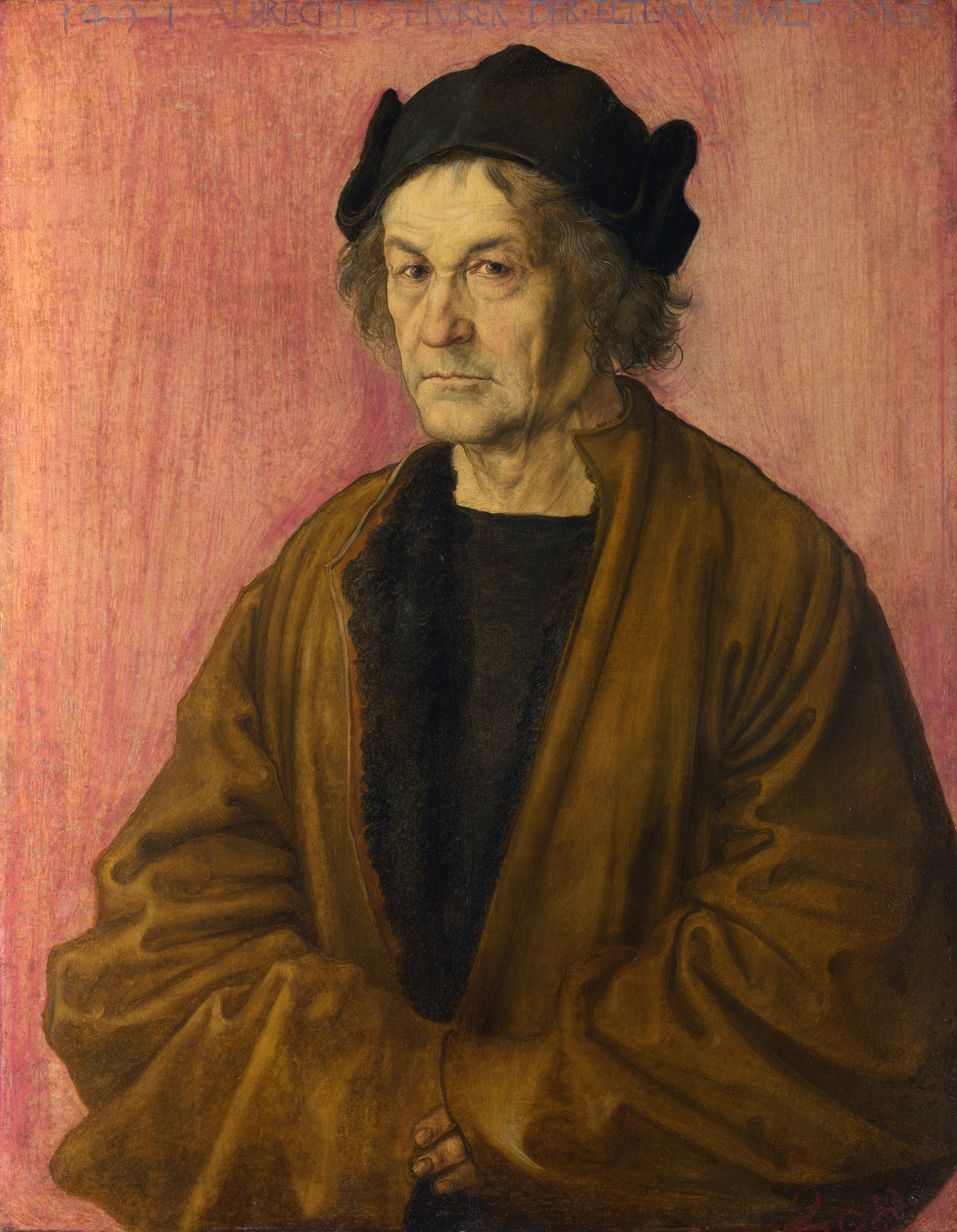
Portrait of Dürer's Father at 70, 1497, attributed to Albrecht Dürer. National Gallery, London. 51 cm x 40.3 cm.

Portrait of Dürer's Father at 70 (or The Painter's Father) is a 1497 oil-on-lime painting by the German painter and printmaker Albrecht Dürer, now in the National Gallery, London. Along with the 1490 Albrecht Dürer the Elder with a Rosary, it is the second of two portraits of the artist's Hungarian father Albrecht Dürer the Elder (1427–1502). The sitter's similarity to the earlier portrait, as well to a 1486 silverpoint drawing believed to be a self-portrait by his father, leave no doubt as to his identity. The London panel is thought to be one of a number of copies of a lost original. It is in poor condition, having suffered paint loss in the background and in areas of the cloak. It was cleaned in 1955, revealing especial quality in the description of the face, leading some to believe that it is a Dürer original. However this claim is not made by the National Gallery who display it as "attributed to Albrecht Dürer".

Although a master goldsmith and well traveled, Albrecht the elder lived in poverty all his life. He fathered 18 children with his much younger wife Barbara Holper, of which only three reached adulthood. He died in 1502, five years after this portrait was completed. He was supportive of his son's precocious talent and recognised it from an early age, sending him to apprenticeship with Michael Wolgemut, one of the highest regarded painters in Nuremberg at the time. From his travels Albrecht senior came into contact with the second generation of Netherlandish Renaissance painters, and through them passed on a key influence on his son's artistic development.

Dürer painted two portraits of his father, one from April 1490—the month before he left on his travels as a journeyman painter—and Portrait at 70 just after his return home to Nuremberg. Following his father's death, the artist wrote an affecting eulogy in which he said that in his life the older man "underwent manifold afflictions, trials and adversities. But he won just praise from all who knew him".

== Albrecht Dürer the Elder ==
Following his father's death five years after this portrait was painted, Dürer wrote that Albrecht the elder "passed his life in great toil and stern hard labour, having nothing for his support save what he earned with his hand for himself, his wife and his children so that he had little enough. He underwent manifold afflictions, trials and adversities. But he won just praise from all who knew him for he lived an honourable Christian life, was a man patient of spirit, mild and peaceable to all and very thankful to God. For himself he had little need of company and worldly pleasures; he was also of few words, and was a God-fearing man."

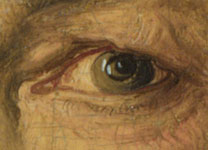
Detail

He was born Albrecht Ajtósi in 1427 in Ajtós, near the village of Gyula in the Kingdom of Hungary. In 1455 had moved to Nuremberg and changed his name to Dürer to adapt to the local Nuremberg dialect. He took up an apprenticeship as a goldsmith under the tutelage of Hieronymus Holper. In 1467, the year his apprenticeship ended, he married Barbara, Holper's 15-year-old daughter. The couple had 18 children, only three of whom survived into adulthood.

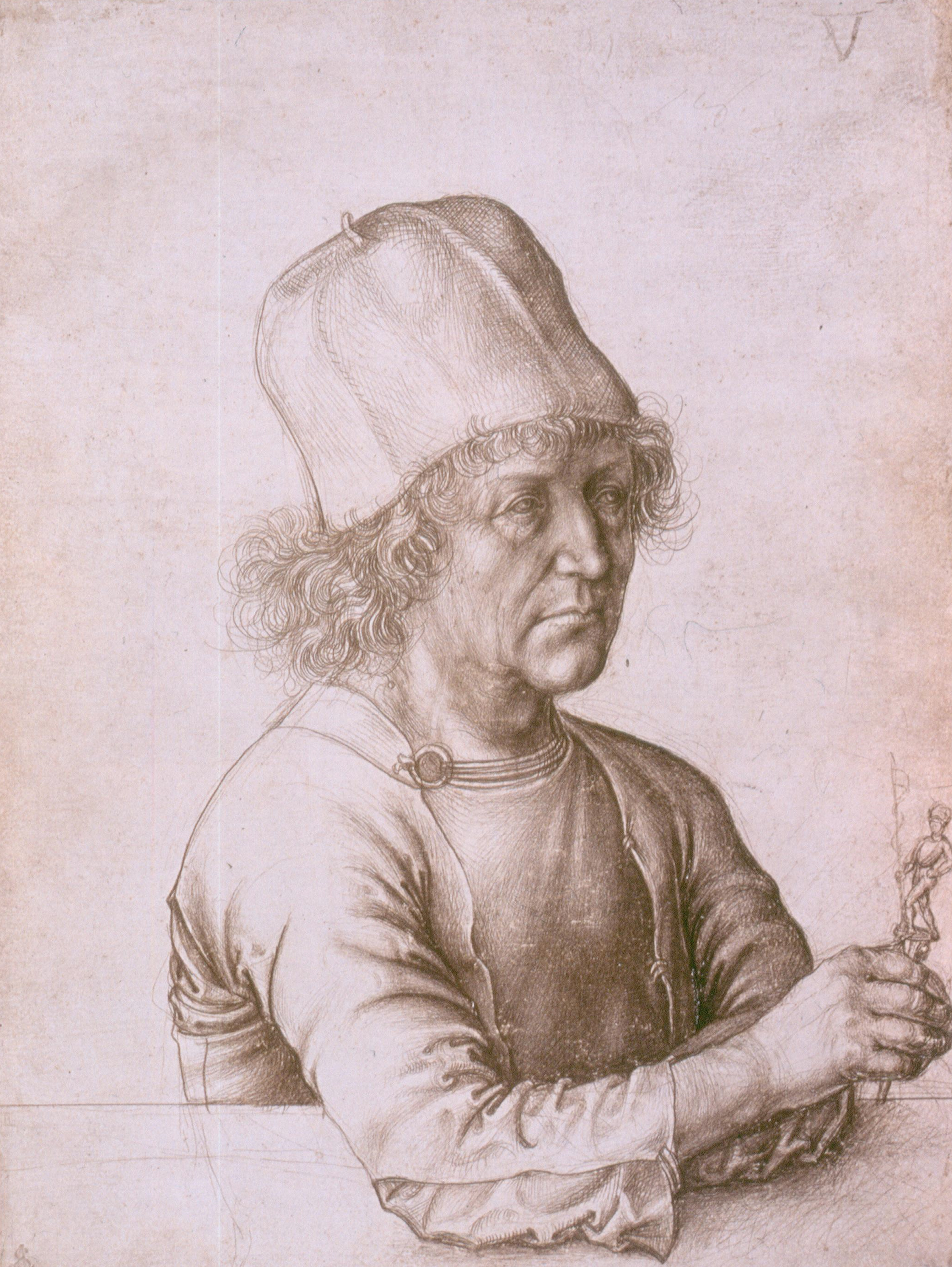
Dürer's Father's Self-portrait, 1486. Silverpoint drawing attributed to Albrecht the elder. Albertina Museum, Vienna.

Albrecht traveled a great deal, and came into contact with the Netherlandish painters while in Flanders. While there he was exposed to the work of both Jan van Eyck and Rogier van der Weyden, and developed a strong appreciation for them which he passed on to his son, whose art displays a large debt to these painters. From his father, Dürer learned to appreciate the fine, almost forensic, attention to realistic detail favoured by the northern painters, as well as their use of brilliant colour. These lessons were key to the young artist's development and set him apart from his fellow German artists, whose work can often feel crude and heavy-handed by comparison.

Albrecht apprenticed his son to Michael Wolgemut, a painter who became aware of the northern artists when he was 14. Already the young artist was showing such potential that his father believed he should be trained by the best local master available.

== Description ==
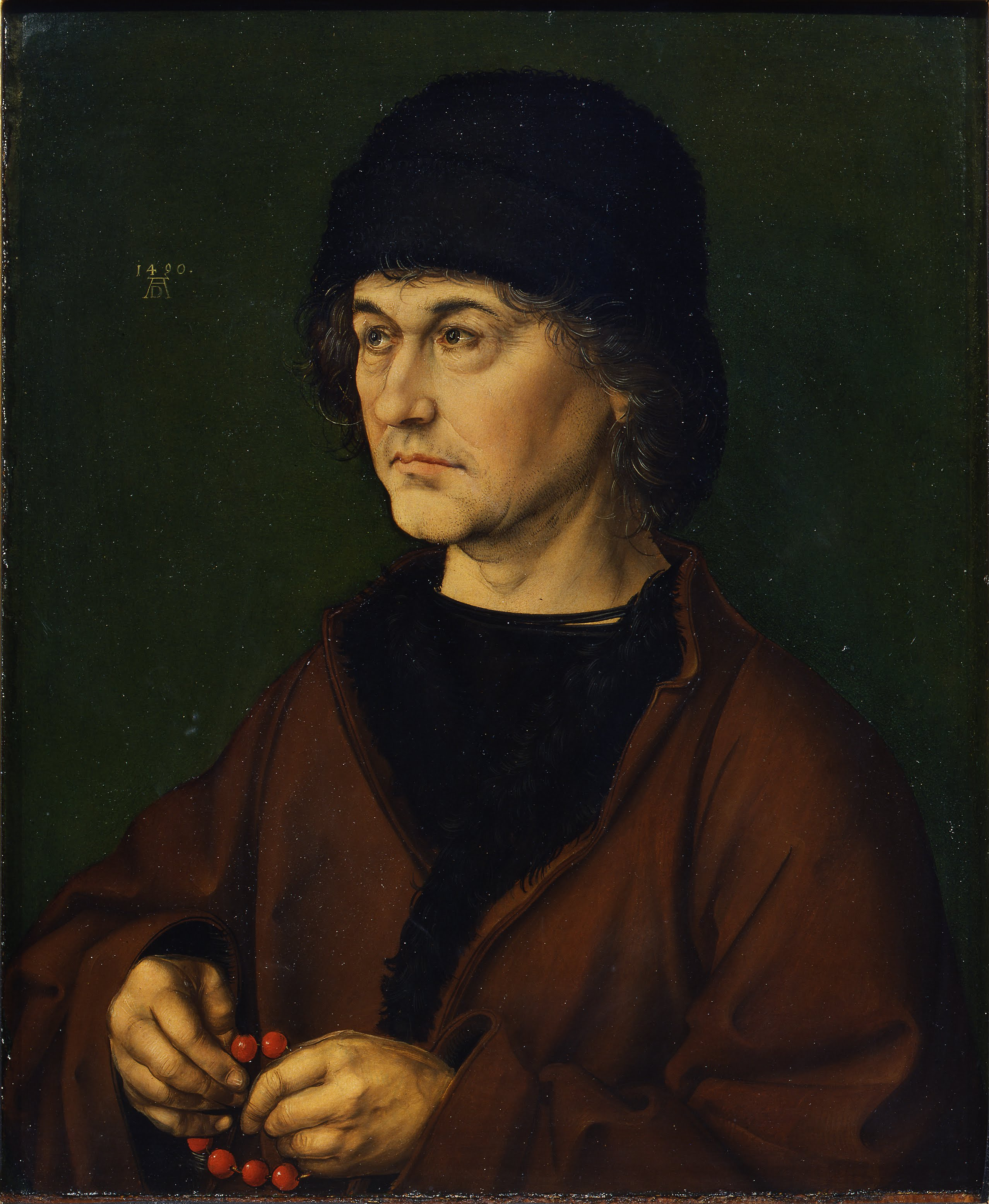
Albrecht Dürer the Elder with a Rosary, April 1490. Oil on oak Panel, 47.5 cm x 39.5 cm. Uffizi, Florence.

Albrecht the elder is shown, aged 70, in half view against a flat reddish background. He is wearing a black Hungarian hat and a long brown robe with a black undergarment. He has an intelligent, piercing gaze, although it may be interpreted as a hostile glance towards the viewer. The toll of age wears heavily on the old man's gaunt features. His fleshy cheeks are heavily folded, his lips thin, and his hair wispy and in disarray. His skin is heavily wrinkled, and his eyes are narrow and give a weary appearance. By comparison to the 1490 Albrecht Dürer the Elder with a Rosary, his hands, though visible, are inactive, possibly due to arthritis.

Compared to his mild and pious expression in the 1490 portrait, Albrecht now seems impatient, while in the words of Marcel Brion, the "stunned look in his eyes seems already to foresee his own death...[the] almost haggard intensity of [his] questioning gaze [is] directed upon those about him as if they could solve the urgent problems to which his own set lips had no answer."

Albrecht retains some of the handsomeness of his youth; he has a strong bone structure with the high cheekbones characteristic of the Slav and Magyar blood in Hungarian appearance. He has almost exotic eyes, which approach his temples in an almost Eastern way.

== Provenance and attribution ==
There is strong evidence that the portrait was originally hung alongside Dürer's 1498 Self-portrait. Both are of the same dimensions and show the subject at half-length. In 1650 the city of Nuremberg gave the pair of portraits to Thomas Howard, Earl of Arundel as a present to King Charles I of England, at a time when Dürer was regarded as the city's proudest son. Both were later sold by Cromwell. Albrecht the Elder's portrait was eventually acquired by the National Gallery in 1904, where it bears the Inventory number NG1938. The self-portrait was bought by the Museo del Prado in Madrid.

When the National Gallery bought the painting, they had little information about its attribution or provenance. A piece of a paper label was found on the reverse, which was believed to have dated from the 17th century and was similar to another found on the back of Dürer's 1498 self-portrait. In addition, they noted the sitter's resemblance to the 1490 portrait and 1486 assumed self-portrait and found a 1639 inventory record which described a portrait of his father as wearing a black hat and wearing "a dark yellow gown wherein his hands are hidden in the wide sleeves painted upon a reddish ground all crack’t". These discoveries lead to the belief that it was the Dürer painting recorded in Charles I possession.

== Gallery ==
Self-portrait at 26, 1498, Museo del Prado, Madrid. Oil on wood panel. This work was for centuries hung alongside his fathers portrait.

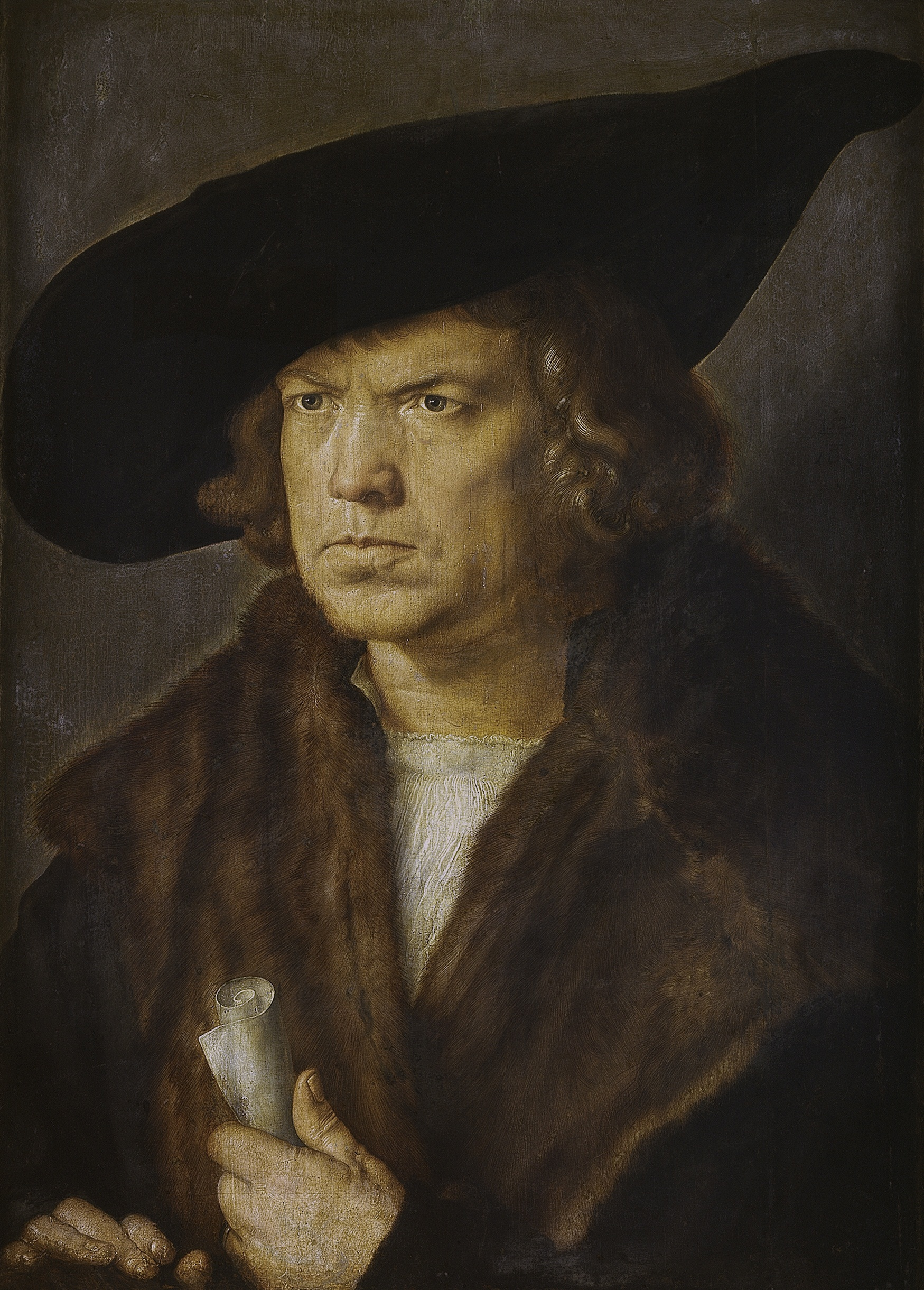
Portrait of a Man, 1521 or 1524. Museo del Prado, Madrid. Panel. Note the stern and suspicious face.

== See also ==
- List of paintings by Albrecht Dürer
