= Self-Portrait (Dürer, Munich) =

1500 self-portrait by Albrecht Dürer

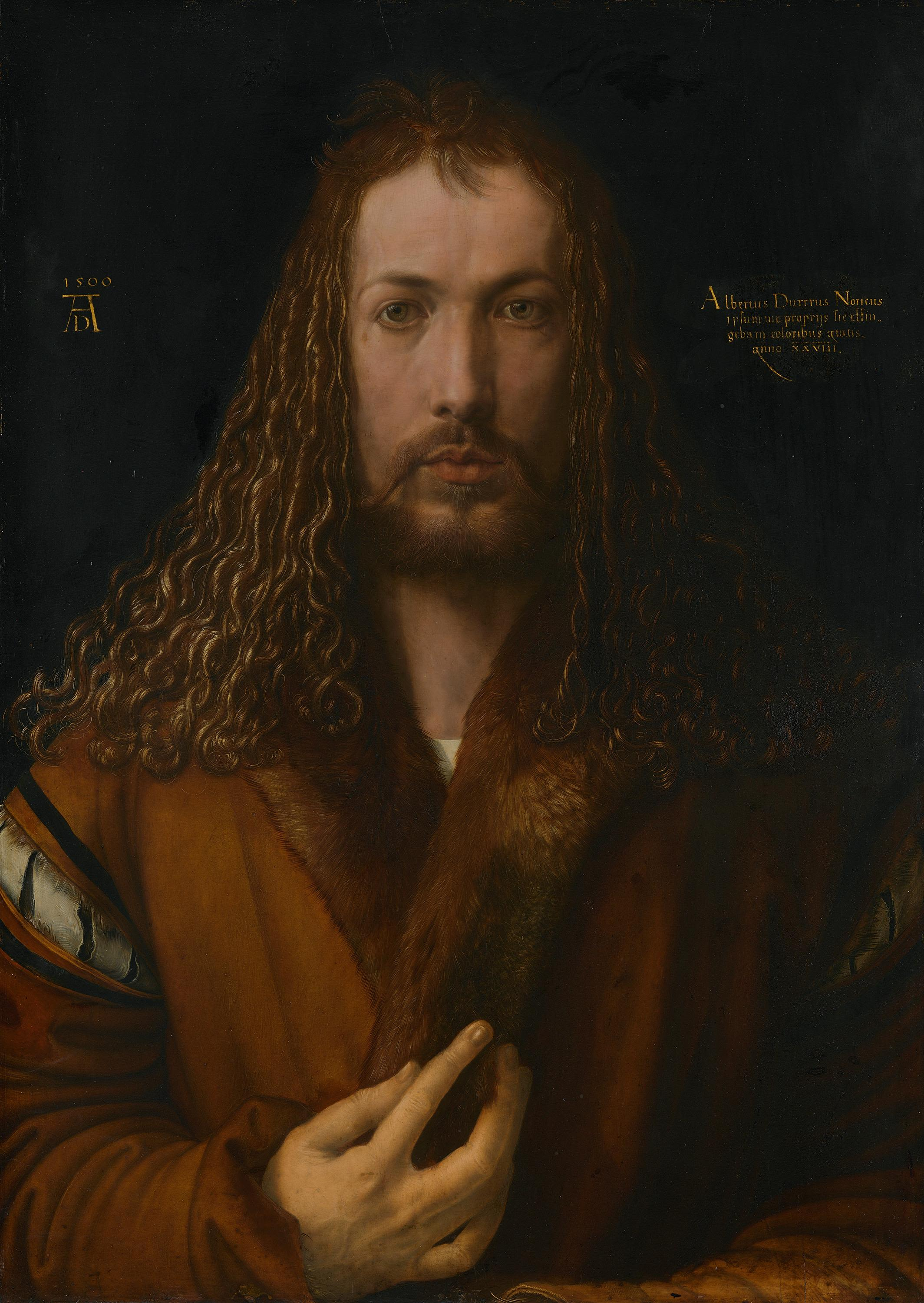
- Artist: Albrecht Dürer
- Year: 1500
- Medium: Oil on panel
- Dimensions: 67.1 cm × 48.9 cm (26.4 in × 19.3 in)
- Location: Alte Pinakothek, Munich

Self-Portrait (or Self-Portrait at Twenty-Eight) is a panel painting by the German Renaissance artist Albrecht Dürer. Completed early in 1500, just before his 29th birthday, it is the last of his three painted self-portraits. Art historians consider it the most personal, iconic and complex of these.

The self-portrait is considered remarkable because of its resemblance to contemporary representations of Christ, which could be interpreted as a feat of either stunning arrogance or blasphemy. The similarities with the conventions of religious painting include the positioning of his hands which seem to be in the act of blessing, the manner of his direct gaze, and the sober and earthy tones.

== Description ==
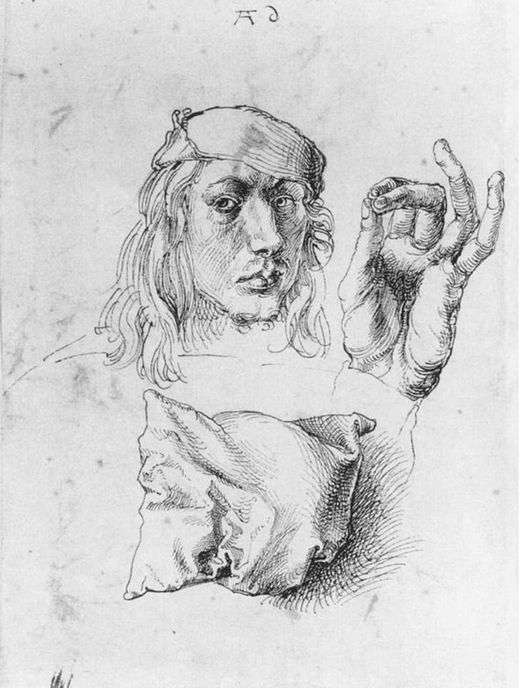
Self-portrait with a pillow, drawing of 1491–92. This study for the Portrait of the Artist Holding a Thistle, was executed on the reverse of that canvas. Note the similarity in the position of the artist's fingers.

Dürer's face has the inflexibility and impersonal dignity of a mask, hiding the restless turmoil of anguish and passion within. In its directness and apparent confrontation with the viewer, the self-portrait is unlike any that came before. It is half-length, frontal and highly symmetrical; its lack of a conventional background seemingly presents Dürer without regard to time or place. The placement of the inscriptions in the dark fields on either side of Dürer are presented as if floating in space, emphasizing that the portrait has a highly symbolic meaning. Its sombre mood is achieved through the use of brown tones set against the plain black background. The lightness of touch and tone seen in his earlier two self-portraits has been replaced by a far more introverted and complex representation.

In 1500, a frontal pose was exceptional for a secular portrait. In Italy, the conventional fashion for profile portraits was coming to an end, but being replaced with the three-quarters view which had been the accepted pose in Northern Europe since about 1420, and which Dürer used in his earlier self-portraits. Fully frontal poses remained unusual, although Hans Holbein painted several of Henry VIII of England and his queens, perhaps under instruction to use the pose. Late medieval and Early Renaissance art had developed the more difficult three-quarters view, and artists were proud of their skill in using it; to viewers in 1500 and after, a frontal pose was associated with images from medieval religious art, and especially images of Christ.

The self-portrait is of a markedly more mature Dürer than both the 1493 Strasbourg self-portrait and the 1498 self-portrait which he produced after his first visit to Italy; in both of these earlier paintings he had highlighted his fashionable hairstyle and clothing and played on his youthful good looks. Dürer turned 28 around 1500, the time of this work. In the medieval view of the stages of life, 28 marked the transition from youth to maturity. The portrait therefore commemorates a turning point in the artist's life and in the millennium: the year 1500, displayed in the centre of the upper left background field, is here celebrated as epochal. Moreover, the placing of the year 1500 above his signature initials, A.D., gives them an added meaning as an abbreviation of Anno Domini. The painting may have been created as part of a celebration of the saeculum by the circle of the Renaissance humanist scholar Conrad Celtes, which included Dürer.

== Iconography ==
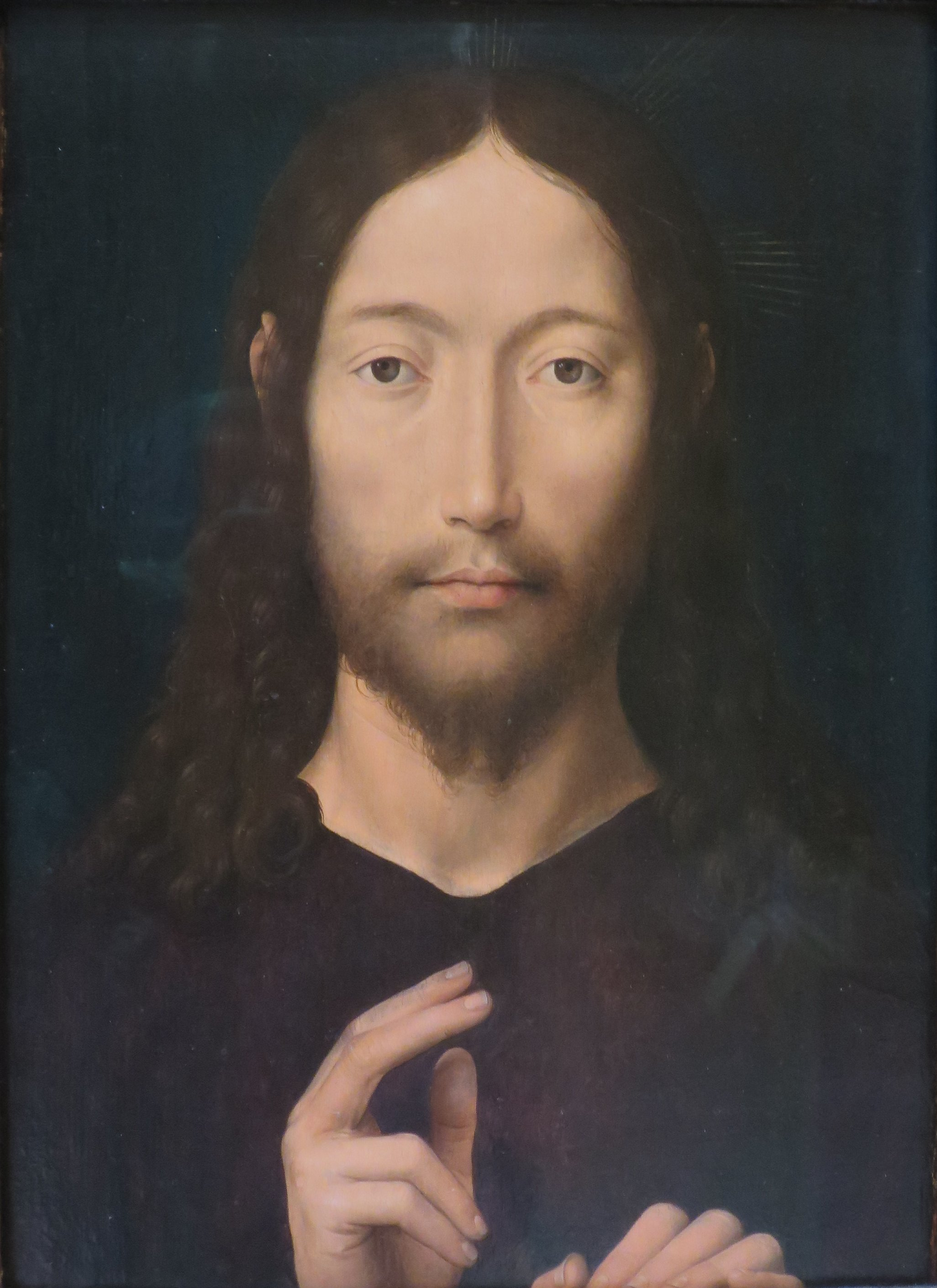
Blessing Christ by Hans Memling, late 15th century

Dürer seems to portray himself in a manner that invokes depictions of Christ. The Latin inscription, composed by Celtes' personal secretary, translates as: "I, Albrecht Dürer of Nuremberg portrayed myself in appropriate [or everlasting] colours aged twenty-eight years". A further interpretation holds that the work is an acknowledgement that his artistic talents are God-given. The art historian Joseph Koerner wrote that "to seeing the frontal likeness and inward curved left hand as echoes of, respectively, the "A" and nestled "D" of the monogram featured at the right ... nothing we see in a Dürer is not Dürer's, monogram or not."

Late Northern medieval painting often portrayed Christ looking directly at the viewer, especially when shown as Salvator Mundi. Typically he was shown with a short beard, moustache and brown parted hair. Dürer has rendered himself in this manner, and gives himself brown hair, despite his other self-portraits showing his hair as reddish-blond. The painting so closely follows the conventions of late medieval religious art that it was used as the basis for depictions of Christ in a woodcut by Sebald Beham of c. 1520. This was perhaps intended to be passed off as a print by Dürer from the start, and in later printings bears a very large Dürer monogram, though this appears to have been added to the block several decades later; it was accepted by most experts as a Dürer until the 19th century. In the next century, the face was used for Christ again, in a Christ and the Woman Taken in Adultery of 1637 by Johann Georg Vischer.

Dürer showed himself in similar poses and expressions in both his 1498 Christ as Man of Sorrows and 1503 charcoal drawing Head of the Dead Christ. Although they are not to be self-portraits, they are not named as such, artist historians believe that since they bear remarkable similarities to his known self-portraits—including prominent eyes, a narrow mouth with a full upper lip, and the shape of both the nose and indent between lip and nose—that Dürer intended to represent himself.

== Provenance ==
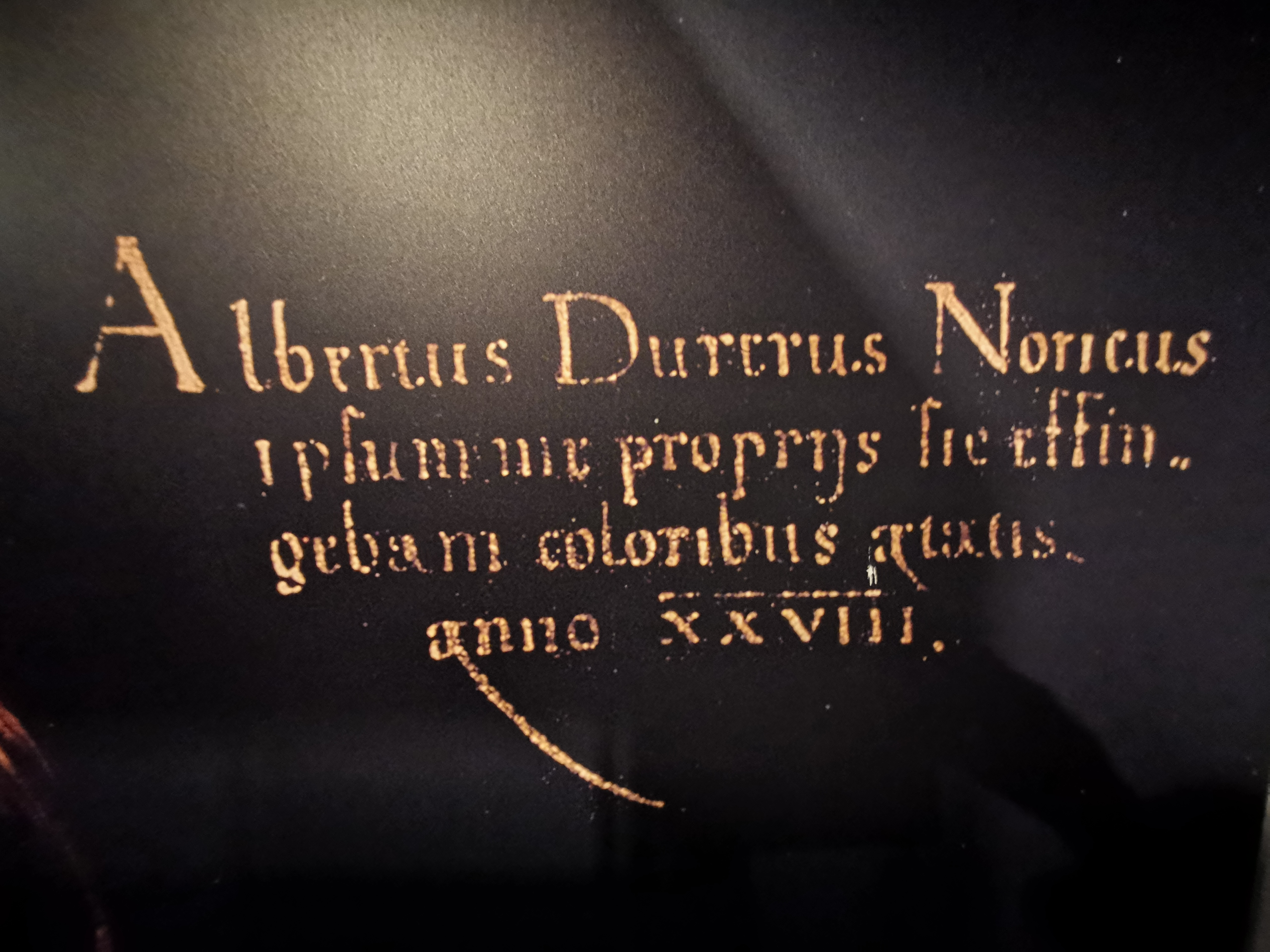
Inscription from the right mid ground

The portrait was likely donated or sold by Dürer to the Nuremberg city council. It was probably on continuous public display in Nuremberg from just before Dürer's death in 1528 until 1805, when it was sold to the Bavarian royal collection. It is now in the Alte Pinakothek in Munich, Germany.

Dürer was highly conscious of his self-image, and painted two earlier self-portraits: one in 1493 now in the Musée du Louvre, and another in 1498, now in the Museo del Prado. He also inserted self-portraits in other paintings, and made self-portrait drawings, although, he did not portray himself in any of his prints. At least twelve self-portrait images survive, as well as the lost gouache Dürer sent to Raphael c 1515.

== Gallery ==
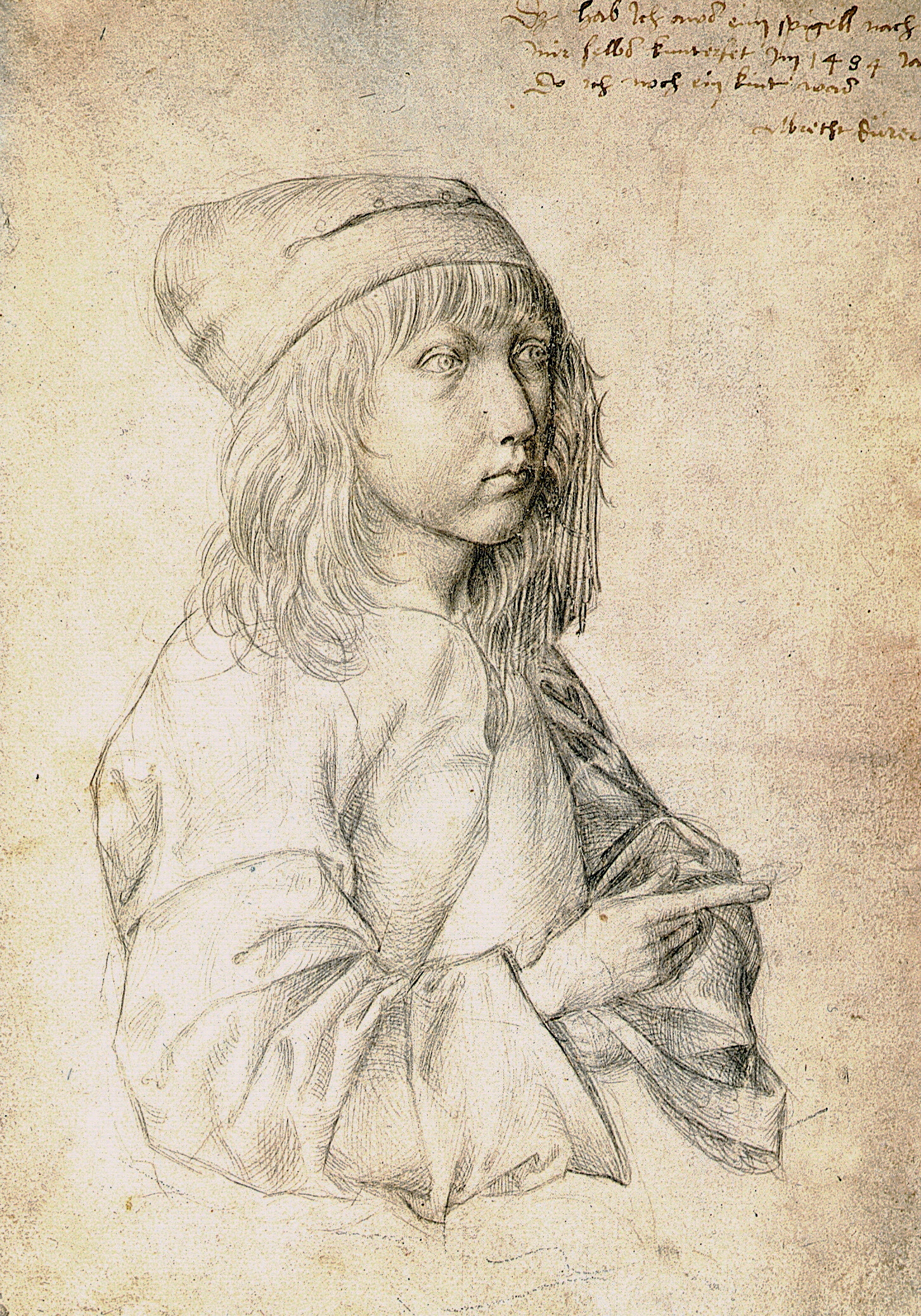
Self-Portrait at the Age of 13, 1484. Silverpoint drawing, Vienna

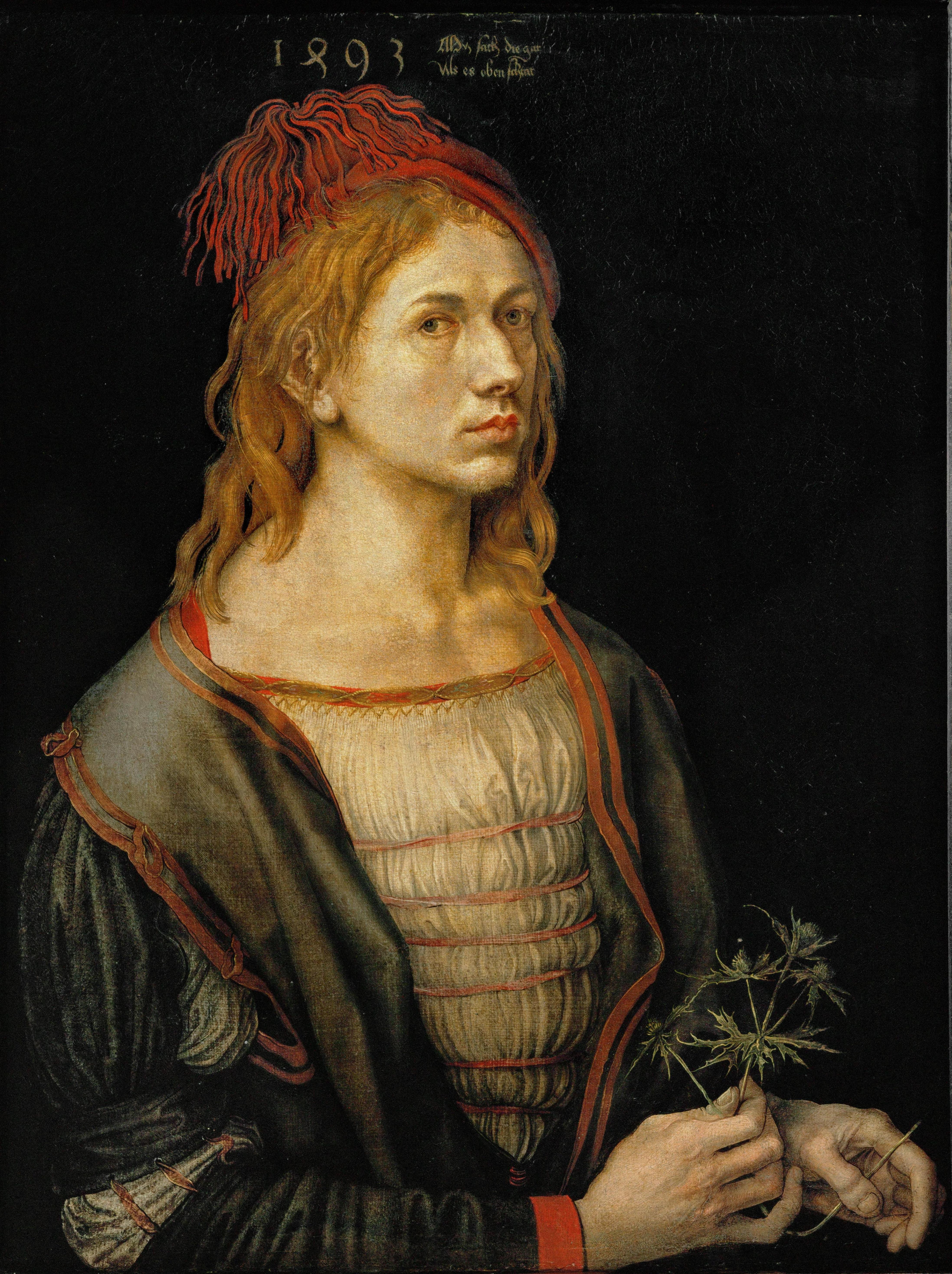
Portrait of the Artist Holding a Thistle, 1493. Musée du Louvre

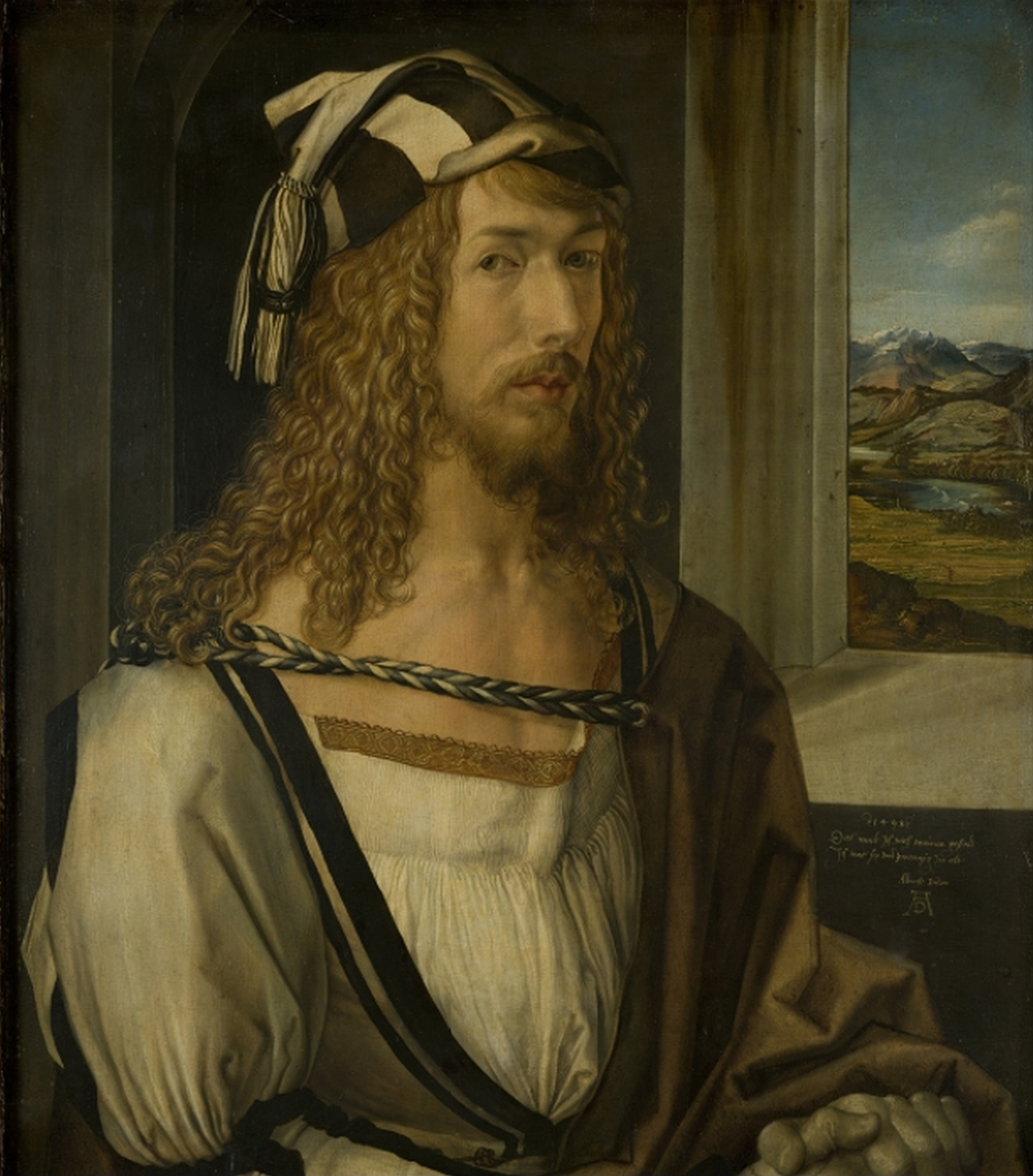
Self-portrait at 26, 1498. Museo del Prado
