= Portrait of the Artist Holding a Thistle =

1493 self-portrait by Albrecht Dürer

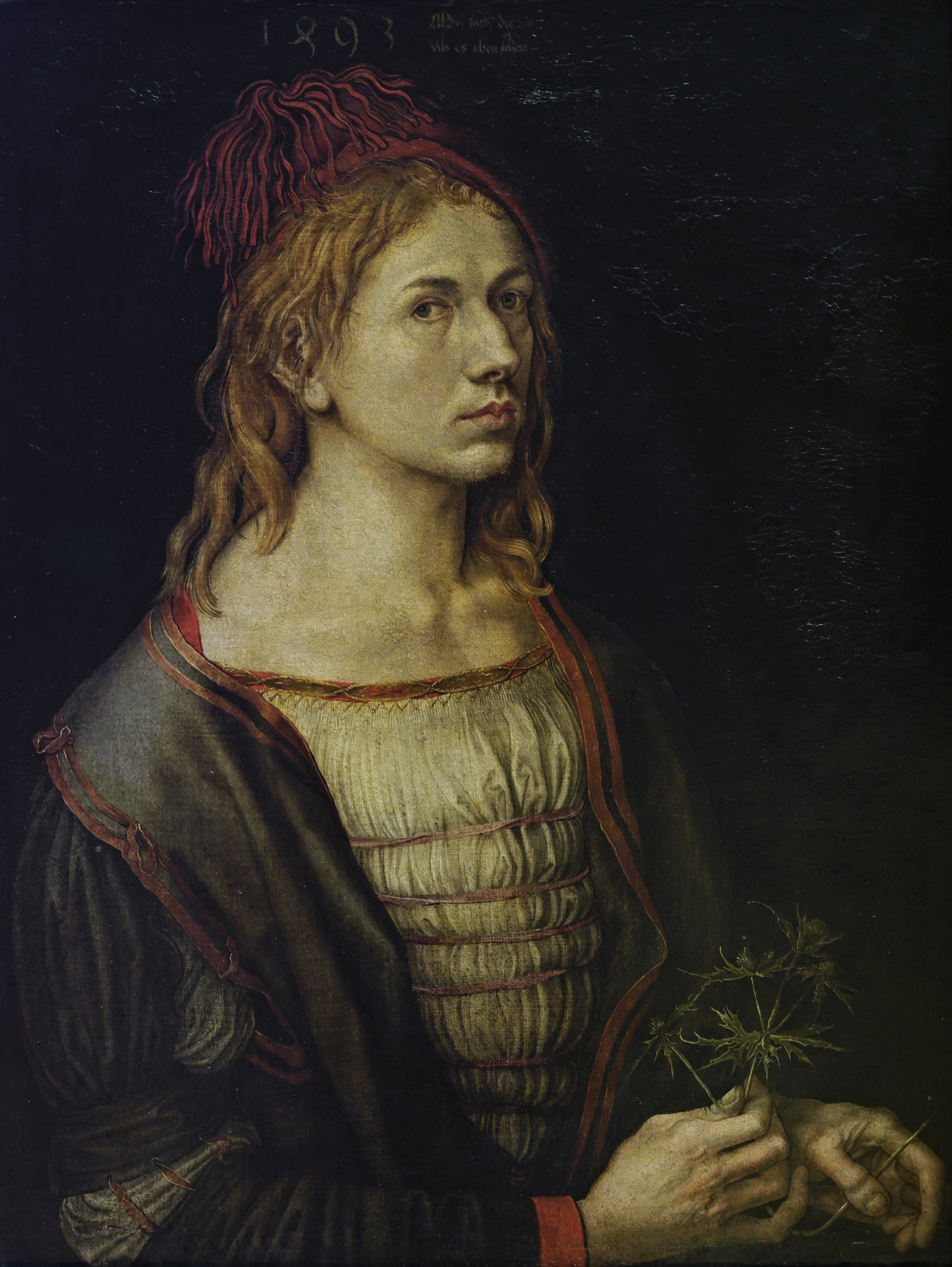
- Artist: Albrecht Dürer
- Year: 1493
- Type: Oil on vellum (transferred to canvas ca. 1840)
- Dimensions: 56.5 cm × 44.5 cm (22.2 in × 17.5 in)
- Location: Louvre; Paris

Portrait of the Artist Holding a Thistle (or Eryngium) is an oil painting on parchment pasted on canvas by the German artist Albrecht Dürer. Painted in 1493, it is the earliest of Dürer's painted self-portraits and has been identified as one of the first self-portraits painted by a Northern artist. It was acquired in 1922 by the Louvre in Paris.

Dürer looks out at the viewer with a psychologically complex but rather melancholy and reserved, serious minded, facial expression. During the 15th century, thistles were symbols of male conjugal fidelity.

== History ==
In 1493, Dürer was 22 years old and working in Strasbourg. He had completed his apprenticeship with Michael Wolgemut and his tour as a journeyman, and would marry Agnes Frey on 7 July 1494.

The date and the plant in the artist's hand seem to suggest that this is a betrothal portrait (Brautporträt). Dürer has in fact depicted himself in the act of offering a flowering spray identified by botanists as Eryngium amethystinum: its German name is "Mannestreue", meaning conjugal fidelity. Resembling the thistle (from which the portrait's title), this umbelliferous plant is used in medicine, and is regarded as an aphrodisiac. It may also have religious significance; the same plant in outline form is inscribed in the gold ground of Dürer's painting Christ as the Man of Sorrows (1493–94).

Dürer was temperamentally inclined to philosophical doubts. He often analysed his own face in drawn or painted effigies, sometimes idealising it, sometimes not. The lines written beside the date reveal the philosophical and Christian intention of the work: Myj sach die gat (Als es oben schtat). In other words: My affairs follow the course allotted to them on high. Marriage has in part determined his destiny – the Bridegroom puts his future life in the hands of God.

In 1805, Goethe saw a copy of the portrait in the museum at Leipzig and described it as of "inestimable value." According to Lawrence Gowing, who calls this "the most French of all his pictures", the Portrait of the Artist Holding a Thistle is singular among Dürer's paintings as "the touch is freer and color more iridescent than in any other picture one remembers".

== See also ==
- List of paintings by Albrecht Dürer
