= Fedja Anzelewsky =

German art historian

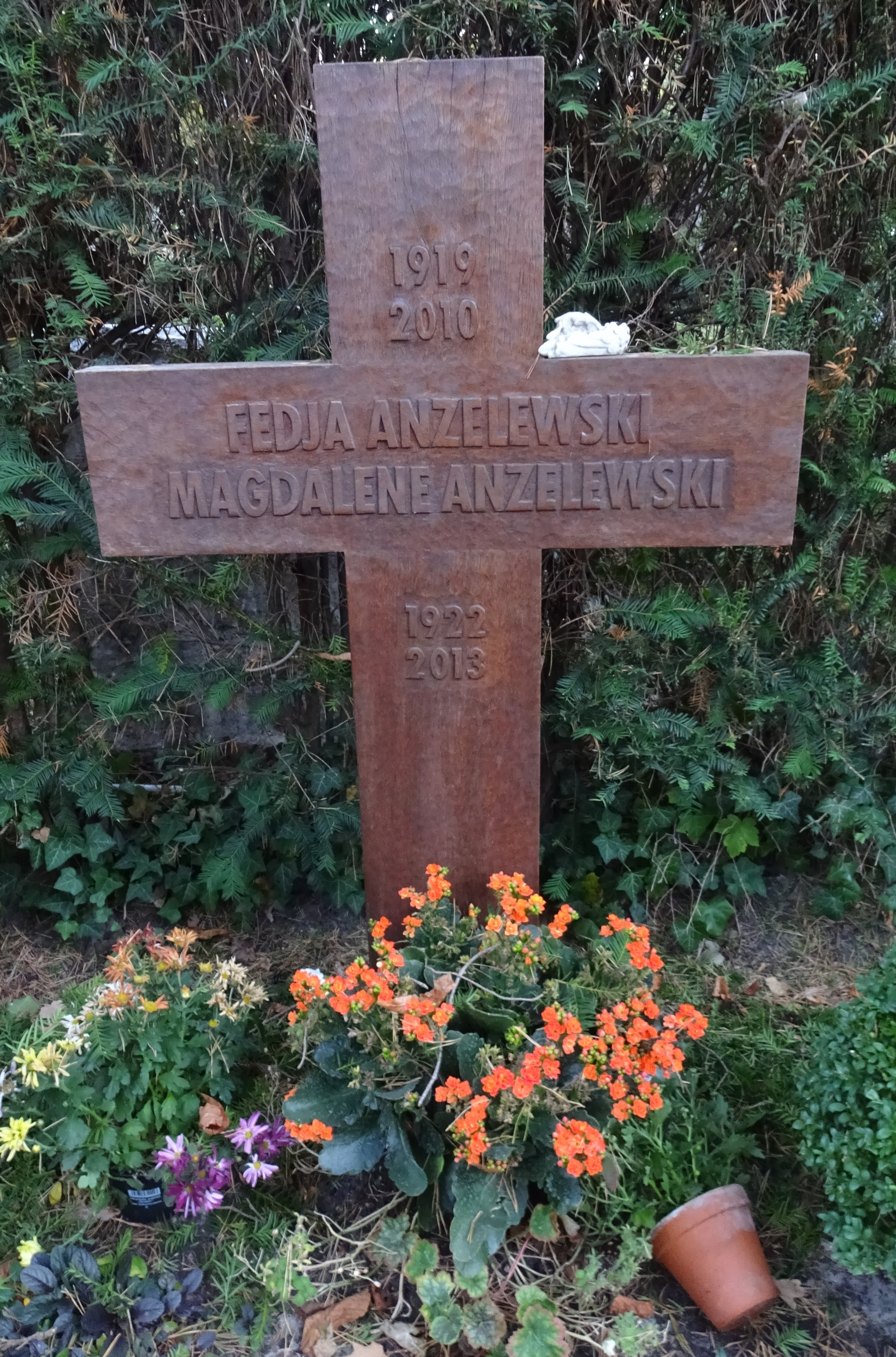
Grave stone

Fedja Erik Allan Anzelewsky (17 March 1919, Nordhausen – 18 May 2010, Berlin) was a German art historian, best known for his internationally recognised monographs on Albrecht Dürer.

== Life ==
Born in Nordhausen, he gained his doctorate at the Freien Universität Berlin in 1954 with a thesis on Motif and Exemplum in Durer's early woodcuts. Dürer remained a keen interest throughout his career and he published internationally-recognised works on him.

From 1954 he worked at the Staatliche Museen zu Berlin in Berlin-Dahlem, from 1957 as an assistant in its prints and drawings department, from 1960 its custodian and from 1977 to 1984 its director. He also taught as an honorary professor at the Free University of Berlin's Art Historical Institute. He died in Berlin and is buried at the Evangelischer Kirchhof Nikolassee.

== Selected works ==
=== Dürer ===
- Dürer und seine Zeit. Meisterzeichnungen aus dem Berliner Kupferstichkabinett. Ausstellungskatalog. Staatliche Museen Preußischer Kulturbesitz, Berlin 1967.
- Albrecht Dürer. Das malerische werk. Deutscher Verlag für Kunstwissenschaft, Berlin(-West) 1971, ISBN 3-87157-040-0. Neuausgabe: Albrecht Dürer. Das malerische Werk. Band 1: Tafelband. Band 2: Textband. Deutscher Verlag für Kunstwissenschaft, Berlin 1991, ISBN 3-87157-137-7.
- Dürer. Werk und Wirkung. Electa-Klett-Cotta, Stuttgart 1980, ISBN 3-88448-007-3.
- Dürer-Studien. Untersuchungen zu den ikonographischen und geistesgeschichtlichen Grundlagen seiner Werke zwischen den beiden Italienreisen. Deutscher Verlag für Kunstwissenschaft, Berlin 1983, ISBN 3-87157-104-0.

=== Other ===
- Miniaturen aus der Toggenburg-Chronik aus dem Jahre 1411. Klein, Baden-Baden 1960.
- Miniaturen aus deutschen Handschriften. Klein, Baden-Baden 1961.
- Grünewald. Das Gesamtwerk. Ullstein, Frankfurt 1980, ISBN 3-548-36021-1
- Die großen Meister der Malerei.
