= Master W. B. =

German painter

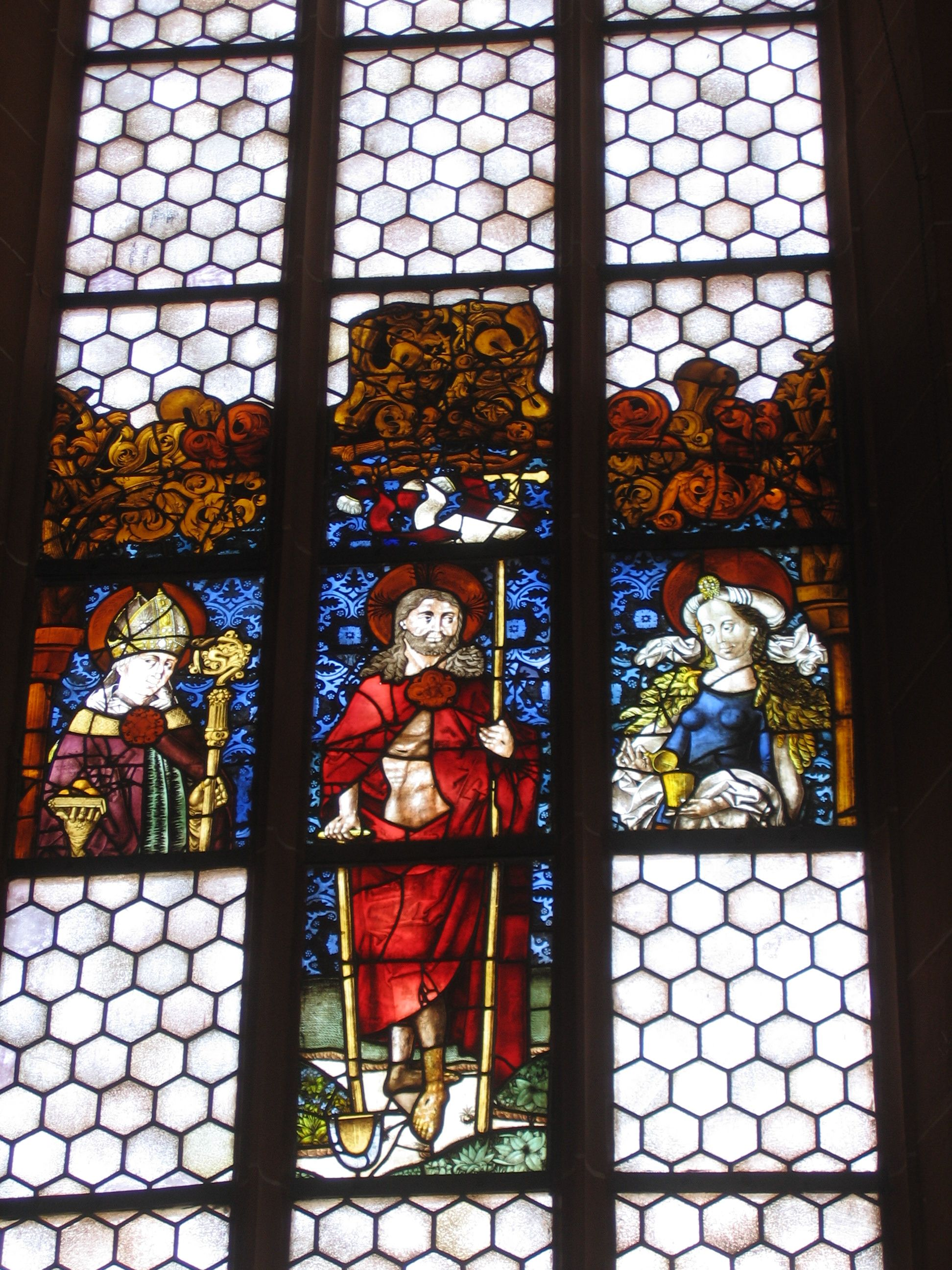
Stained glass window from the Marienkirche in Hanau, attributed to Master W. B. The windows were heavily damaged by World War II bombing.

Master W. B. (fl. late 15th century in Mainz) was an anonymous German painter, engraver, and stained glass designer of the late Gothic era. He has been tentatively identified as Wolfgang Beurer, about whom very little is known.
