= Head of a Walrus =

1521 watercolour by Albrecht Dürer

Head of a Walrus, 1521. Pen drawing in Indian ink and watercolor on paper

Head of a Walrus (German: Kopf eines Walrosses) is a 1521 pen drawing painted in watercolour by the German artist Albrecht Dürer, now in the British Museum, London. At the time the walrus' main European population was around Scandinavia, and they were exotic to inland Europeans. The work reflects Dürer fascination with what he perceived as unusual animals, with similarly intentioned works including depictions of lions and rhinoceros. The drawing was created as part of a larger series of 167 drawings of quadrupeds.

The drawing is generally considered as not successful; and is viewed as curious attempted depiction that is neither aesthetically pleasing nor anatomically true to life. Art historians assume the artist drew it from memory having viewed a dead example during a 1520 visit to Zeeland to see a stranded whale which had decomposed before his arrival. Referring to the depiction departure for nature, Durer's animal has been described as "amusing...it looks more like a hairless puppy with tusks. When Dürer drew from life his accuracy was unquestionable, but he had only briefly seen a walrus, and had only fleeting memory and an elaborate verbal description from which to reconstruct the image".

The drawing is inscribed with the words "1521 / Das dosig thÿr van dem jch do das hawbt / contrefett hab ist gefangen worden / jn die niderlendischen see vnd / was XII ellen lang / brawendisch mit für fusse", which were for many years loosely translated to English as "1521, That stupid (or dozy) animal of which I have portrayed the head was caught in the Netherlands sea and was twelve brabant ells long with four feet", although the interpretation of "dosig thÿr" as stupid or dozy is no longer necessarily held, and it may have that the text instead should be inferred as "dasig" or "hiesig", as in "represented here".

The "AD" monograph and dating are later additions by another artist.

== See also ==
- List of paintings by Albrecht Dürer
