= Madonna of the Animals =

Drawing by Albrecht Dürer, c.1503

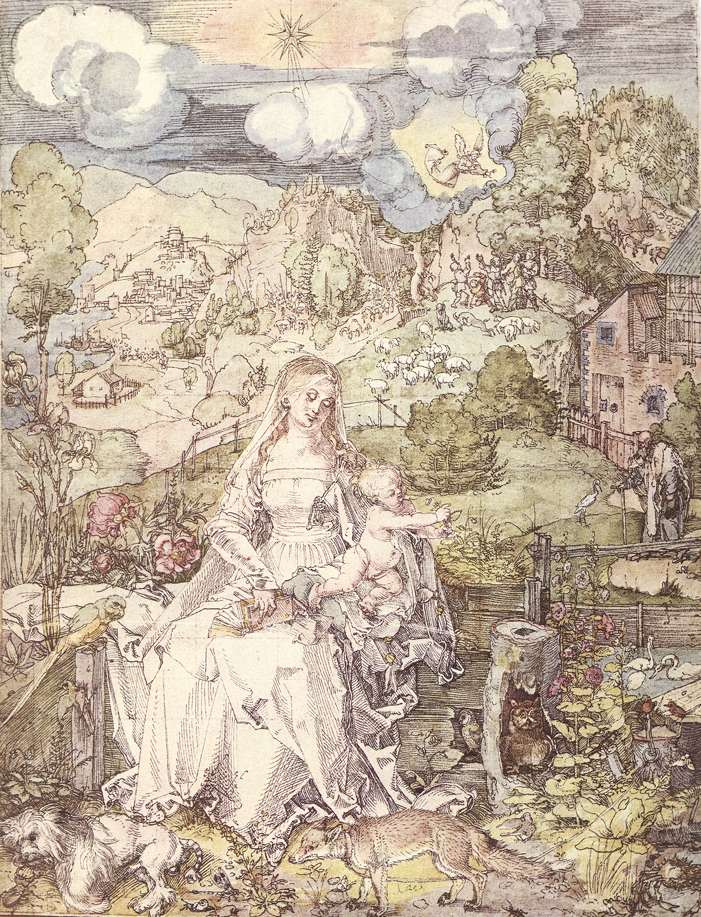
Madonna of the Animals (c. 1503) by Albrecht Dürer

The Madonna of the Animals is a drawing on card by the artist Albrecht Dürer, from c. 1503. It measures 32 by 24 cm. Some areas of the drawing also feature watercolour. It is now held in the prints and drawings collection of the Albertina in Vienna.

== See also ==
- List of paintings by Albrecht Dürer

== Bibliography ==
- Costantino Porcu (ed), Dürer, Rizzoli, Milano 2004.
