= Bagnacavallo Madonna =

Oil painting by Albrecht Dürer, c.1505

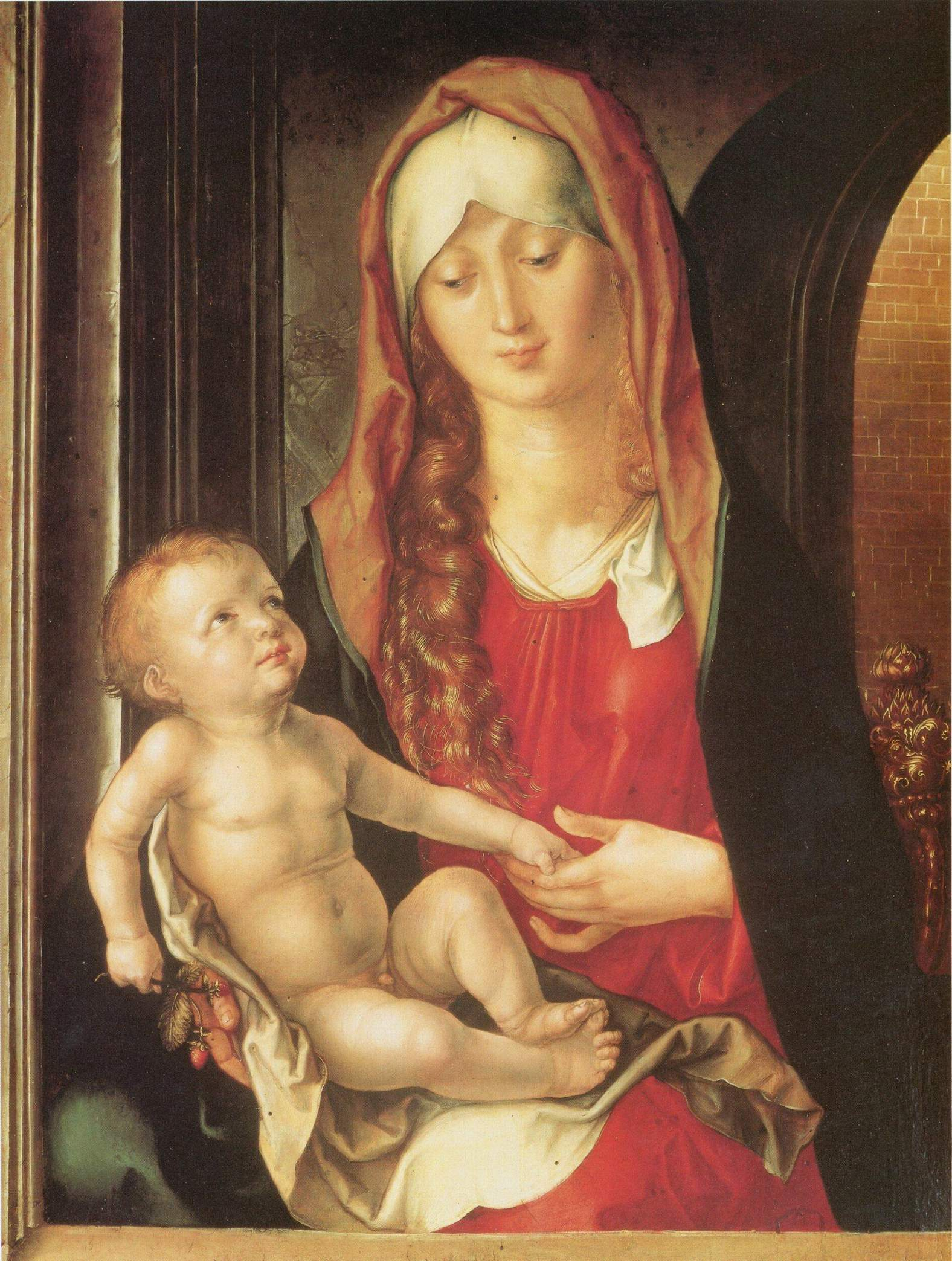
- Artist: Albrecht Dürer
- Year: before 1505
- Medium: Oil on panel
- Dimensions: 48 cm × 36 cm (19 in × 14 in)
- Location: Magnani-Rocca Foundation, Traversetolo

The Bagnacavallo Madonna is an oil painting by Albrecht Dürer, dating to before 1505. It is now in the Magnani-Rocca Foundation of Mamiano di Traversetolo, in the province of Parma, Italy.

== History ==
The work, also called Madonna del Patrocinio, was discovered after World War II in the Capuchin female convent of Bagnacavallo, in the province of Ravenna. In 1961 the Italian art historian Roberto Longhi recognized it as by Dürer, and, a few years later, the work was acquired by the collection currently owning it.

It could be one of the works carried by Dürer with him from Germany in his second trip to Italy in 1505, which he used to fund his expenses. A 1495 preparatory drawing is known, copied from a Child Jesus by Lorenzo di Credi (perhaps seen by the German artist in Venice). Mary's features resemble those of Giovanni Bellini's works, which were also present in Dürer's work from the same period, such as the Haller Madonna.

== Description ==
The scene is set in a dark room with, on the left, a window shut with wooden planks and, on the right, an arch leading to a walled enclosure (symbolizing the hortus conclusus). Mary is seen half-figure with the Child in her lap. The latter's left hand is touching his mother's, while the other holds a sprig of fruit-bearing strawberry plant, one of the symbolic plants of the Triune. The plant the Child holds has only two leaves in the strawberry three-leaf configuration. The missing leaf on the plant indicates the last person of the Trinity in the Child.

== See also ==
- List of paintings by Albrecht Dürer

== Sources ==
- Costantino Porcu, ed. (2004). Dürer. Milan: Rizzoli.
