= Lamentation of Christ (Dürer, Nuremberg) =

Painting by Albrecht Dürer, c.1498

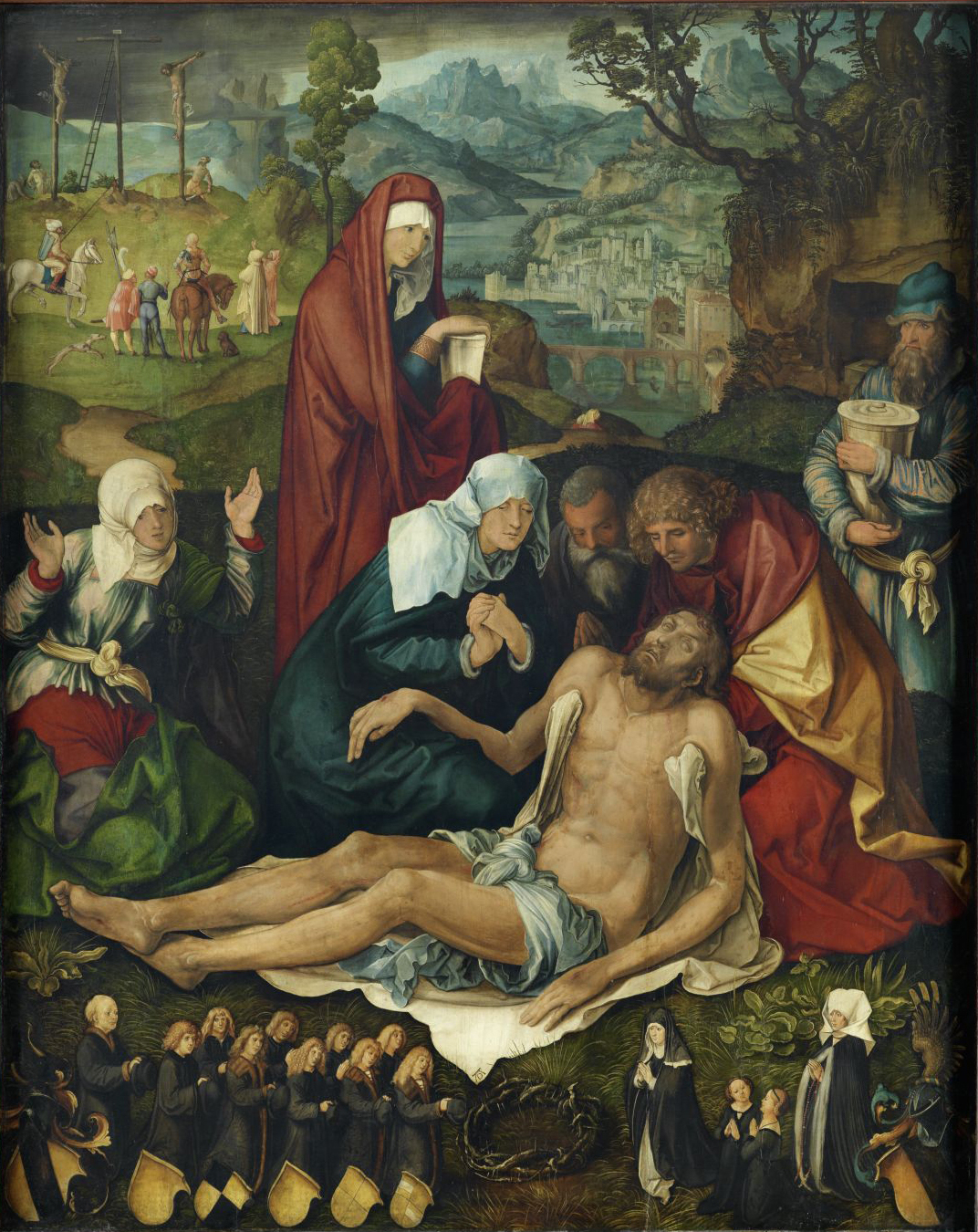
- Artist: Albrecht Dürer
- Year: c. 1498
- Medium: Oil on panel
- Dimensions: 150 cm × 120 cm (59 in × 47 in)
- Location: Germanisches Nationalmuseum, Nuremberg

Lamentation of Christ is an oil-on-panel painting of the common subject of the Lamentation of Christ attributed to German Renaissance artist Albrecht Dürer, executed around 1498 and now in the Germanisches Nationalmuseum of Nuremberg, Germany.

The work was executed for the family chapel of Karl Holzschuher in the church of Sankt Johannis in Nuremberg. Dürer's monogram can be seen in the corner of Jesus' white shroud, but it is commonly considered to be apocryphal.

== Description ==
The center of the painting is occupied by Jesus' dead body, supported by John the Apostle and lamented by Mary, Nicodemus and a pious Woman; Mary Magdalene and Joseph of Arimathea stand behind, holding balms to prepare the corpse for burial. Below is the crown of thorns and, in tiny proportions, the depictions of the donors from the Holzschuher and Grüber families, accompanied by their coat of arms.

The landscape in the background shows the Calvary, where the two thieves are still hanging from their crosses, and, at the center, a town reproduction with a river. On the right is hilly rocky cliff with the sepulchre.

== See also ==
- Lamentation of Christ (Dürer, Munich)
- List of paintings by Albrecht Dürer

== Sources ==
- Costantino Porcu, ed. (2004). Dürer. Milan: Rizzoli.
