= St. Jerome in His Study (Dürer, 1521) =

1521 painting by Albrecht Dürer

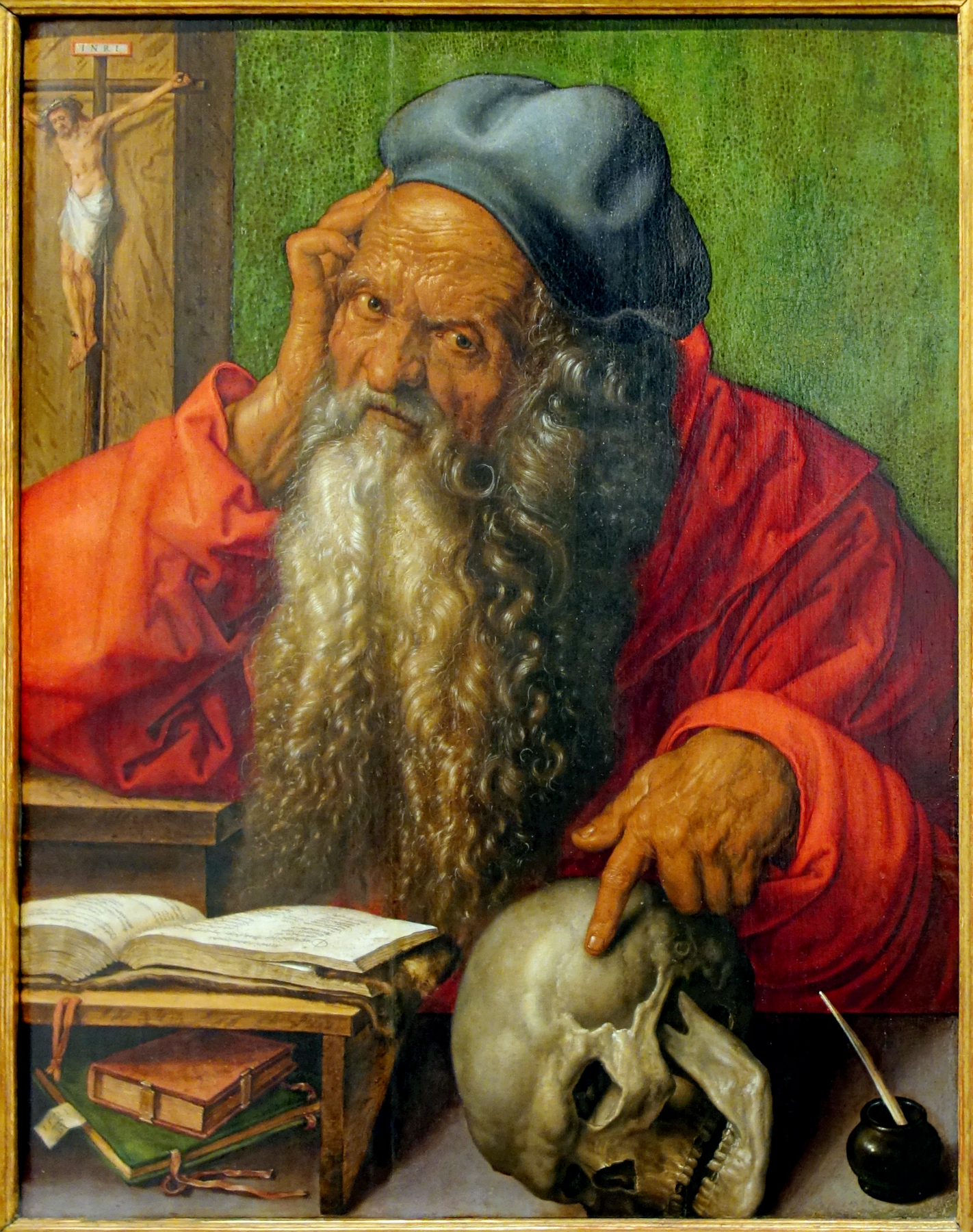
- Artist: Albrecht Dürer
- Year: 1521
- Medium: Oil on panel
- Dimensions: 60 cm × 48 cm (24 in × 19 in)
- Location: Museu Nacional de Arte Antiga, Lisbon

St. Jerome in His Study is an oil on panel painting by the German Renaissance artist Albrecht Dürer, completed March 1521. It is now in the Museu Nacional de Arte Antiga of Lisbon, Portugal.

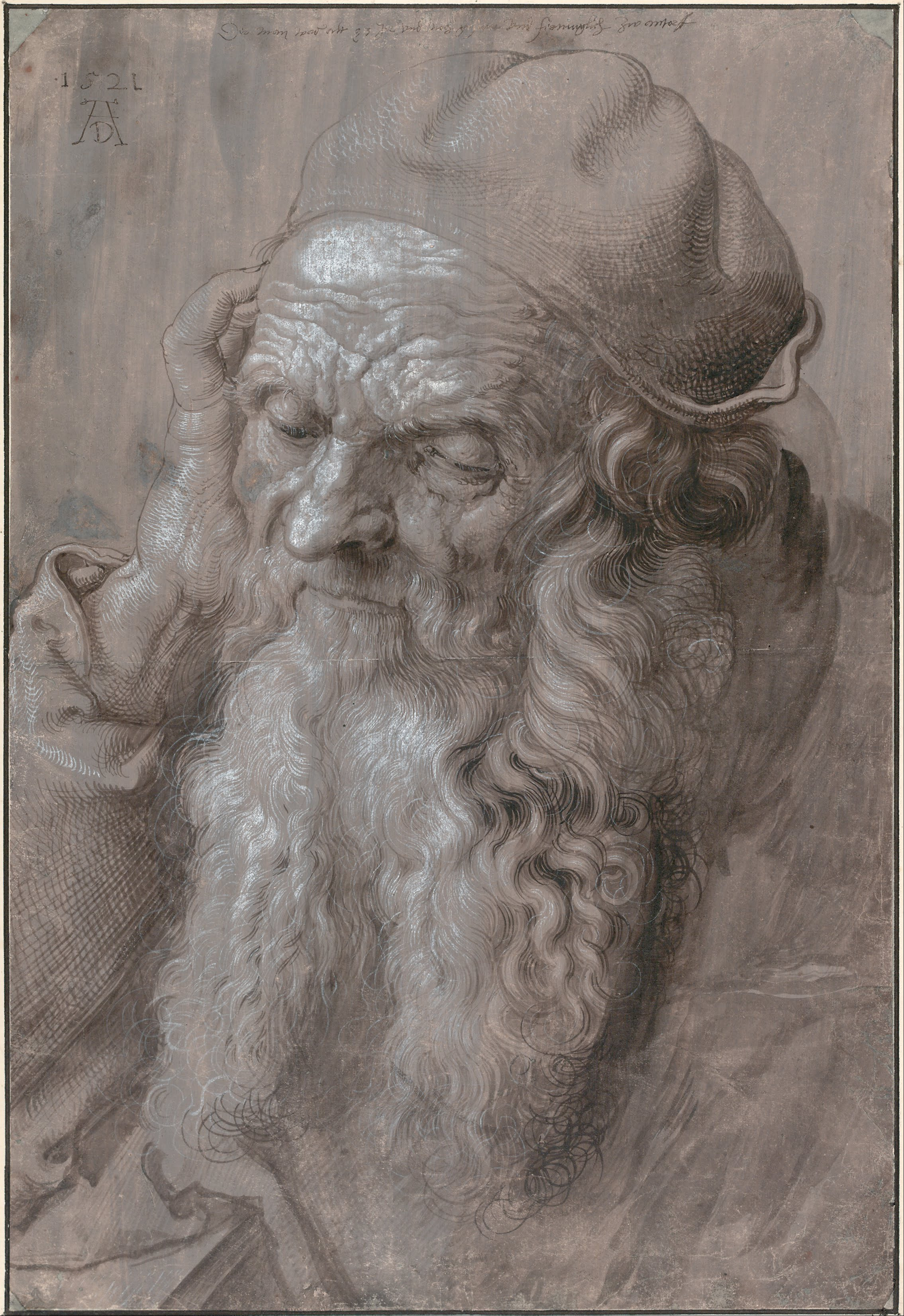
Preparatory drawing.

== History ==
The work was executed by Dürer during his stay in the Netherlands, in 1520–1521, using an aged local man as model. A preparatory drawing exists in the Albertina of Vienna with an annotation of the man's age (93).

The artist donated the painting to the head of the Portuguese trade mission in the Netherlands, Rodrigo Fernandes de Almada. It remained in the latter's family collection until 1880, when it was donated to the current museum.

== Description ==
Among Dürer's depiction of St. Jerome, this is the one more resembling a portrait, with little space left for the study and its details (such as in his 1514 etching, where the saint is a small figure in the background). The subject is portrayed with great attention to detail, including the wrinkles to the white-yellowish beard. Also differently from the etching, the memento mori suggestion of the finger above a skull has a greater visual relevance.

Details in the foreground include the inkpot at right and the bookrest at left, as well as a crucifix on the top left.

== See also ==
- List of paintings by Albrecht Dürer

== Sources ==
- Costantino Porcu, ed. (2004). Dürer. Milan: Rizzoli.
