= Anton Koberger =

German goldsmith, printer and publisher (c. 1440/1445 – 1513)

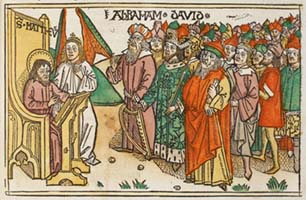
Woodcut from Koberger's Bible, 1483

Anton Koberger (Note: Contemporary documents also spell his name as Koburger, Coberger, or Coburger.) (c. 1440/1445 – 3 October 1513) was a German goldsmith, printer and publisher who printed and published the Nuremberg Chronicle, a landmark of incunabula, and was a successful bookseller of works from other printers. In 1470, he established the first printing house in Nuremberg. Koberger was the godfather of Albrecht Dürer, whose family lived on the same street.

== Life ==
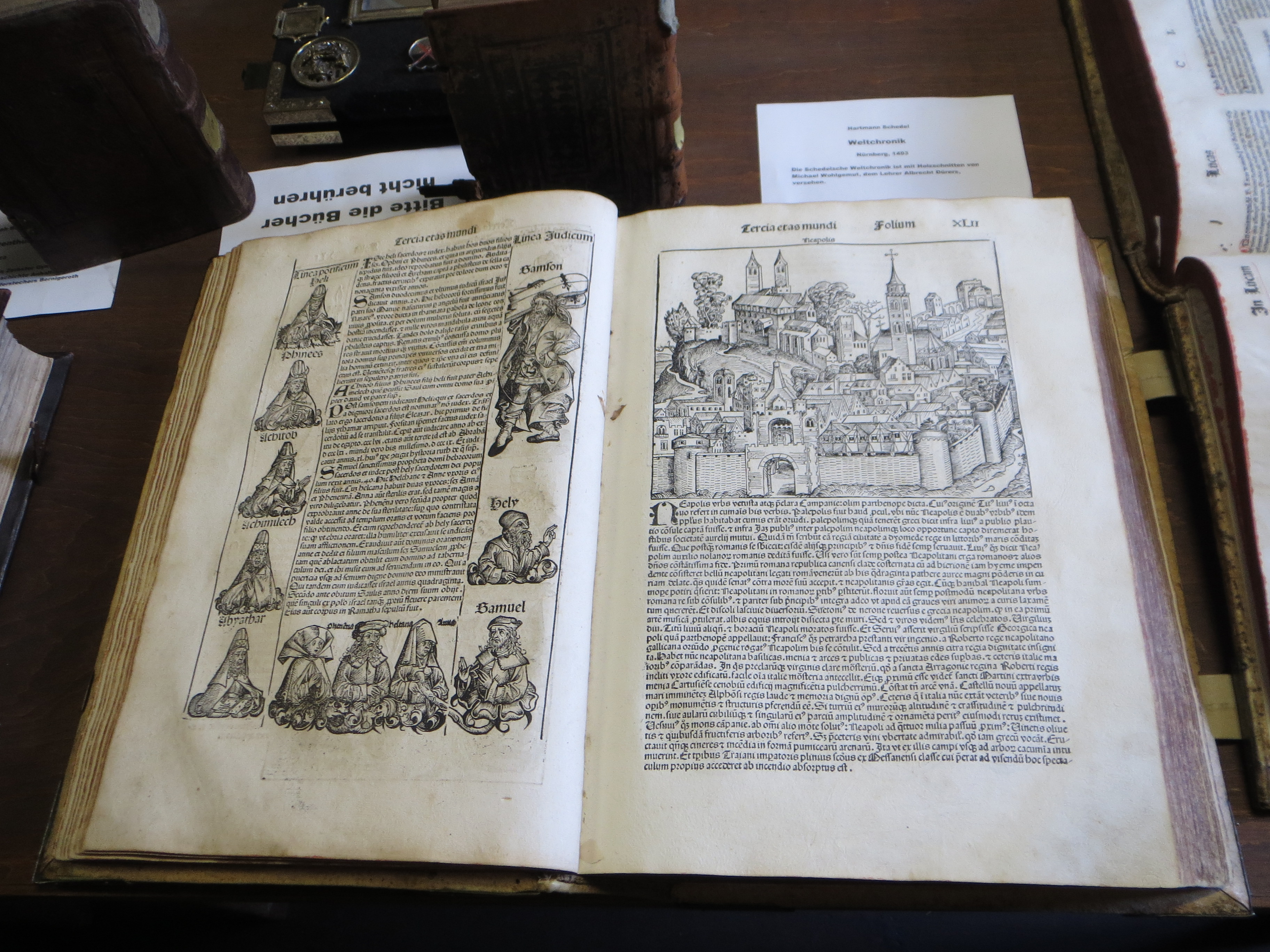
Nuremberg Chronicle, 1493

Anton Koberger was born in 1440 to an established Nuremberg family of bakers, and makes his first appearance in 1464 in the Nuremberg list of citizens. In 1470 he married Ursula Ingram, the daughter of a well-off tradesman, and after her death he remarried a member of the Nuremberg patriciate, Margarete Holzschuher (1470–1539), daughter of city councilor Gabriel Holzschuher, in 1491. She was also a cousin of the city councilor Hieronymus Holzschuher who was portrayed by his friend Dürer in 1526.

Anton Koberger would become the first of his family to become a printer. In the year before his godson Dürer's birth in 1471, he ceased goldsmithing to become a printer and publisher. He quickly became the most successful publisher in Germany, absorbing his rivals over the years to become a large capitalist enterprise, with twenty-four presses in operation, printing numerous works simultaneously and employing at its height 100 workers: printers, typesetters, typefounders, illuminators, and the like. Constantly improving his business prospects, he sent out traveling agents and established links with booksellers all over Western Europe, including Venice, Europe's other great centre of printing, Milan, Paris, Lyon, Vienna and Budapest. At the supply end, he obtained two papermills. In Basel, he collaborated with Johann Amerbach.

In all he fathered twenty-five children, of whom thirteen survived to adulthood. He probably commissioned the Haller Madonna from Dürer, as a gift for his daughter Ursula who had married the young patrician Wolf Haller of the famous Haller von Hallerstein family. Wolf Haller initially entered his father-in-law's business as a helper and traveler, but after a few years he fell out with him and fled to Vienna, where he died in 1505.

Koberger's printing ended in 1504 when he stopped publishing. During his printing career, he had published 220 titles. The many sons turned out to be partly wasteful, partly incapable, and apparently at odds. Some of them continued as goldsmiths and jewelers. The business continued, albeit not as a publisher, only as an assortment. The last known work is a “Bohemian Bible”, printed in 1540 by Melchior Koberger with the publisher Leonhard Milchtaler.

== Major printed editions ==
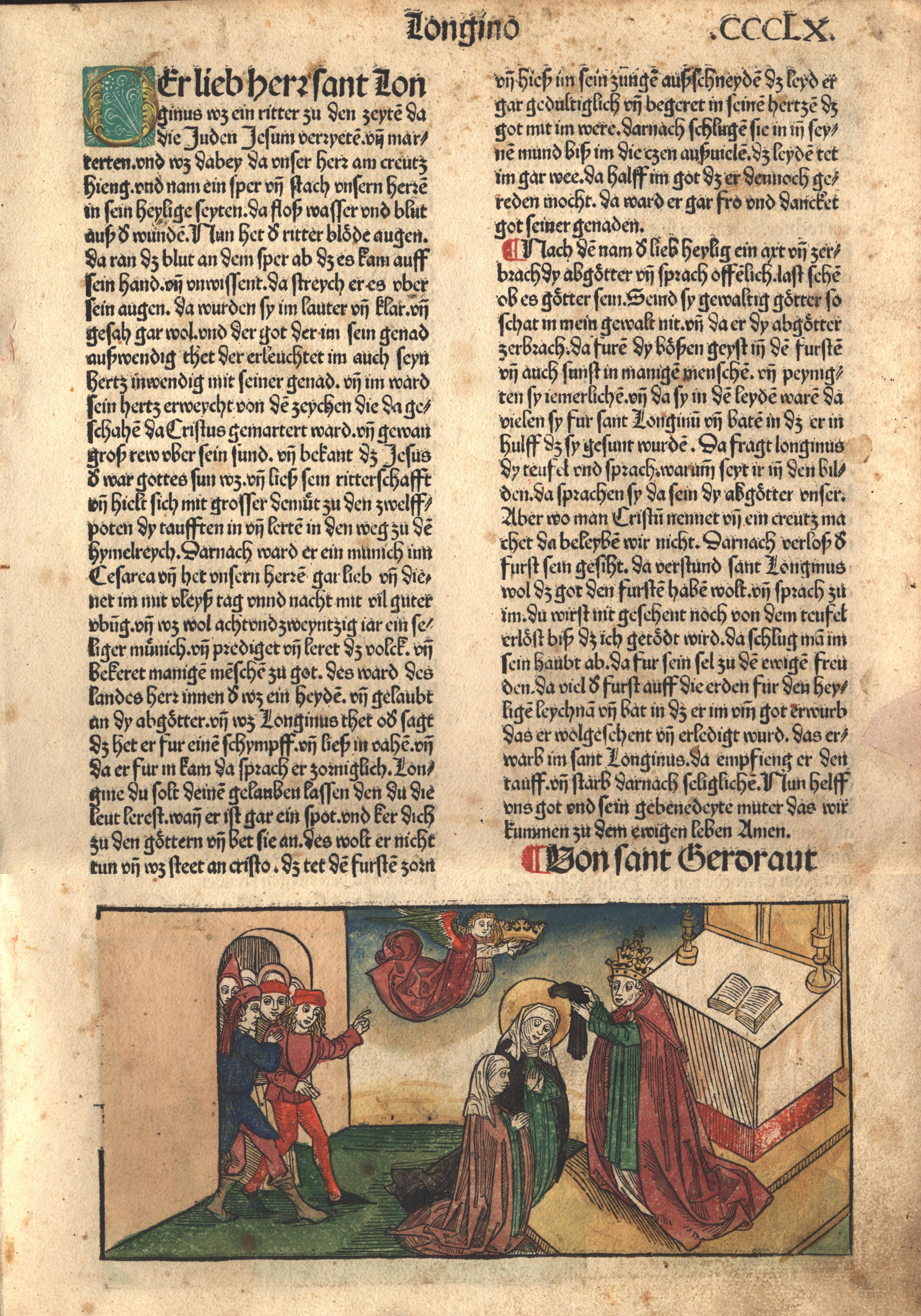
Folio Page from "The Golden Legend" printed by Anton Koberger, 1488. The image depicts a saintly woman being anointed, possibly St. Mary or any number of other female saints.

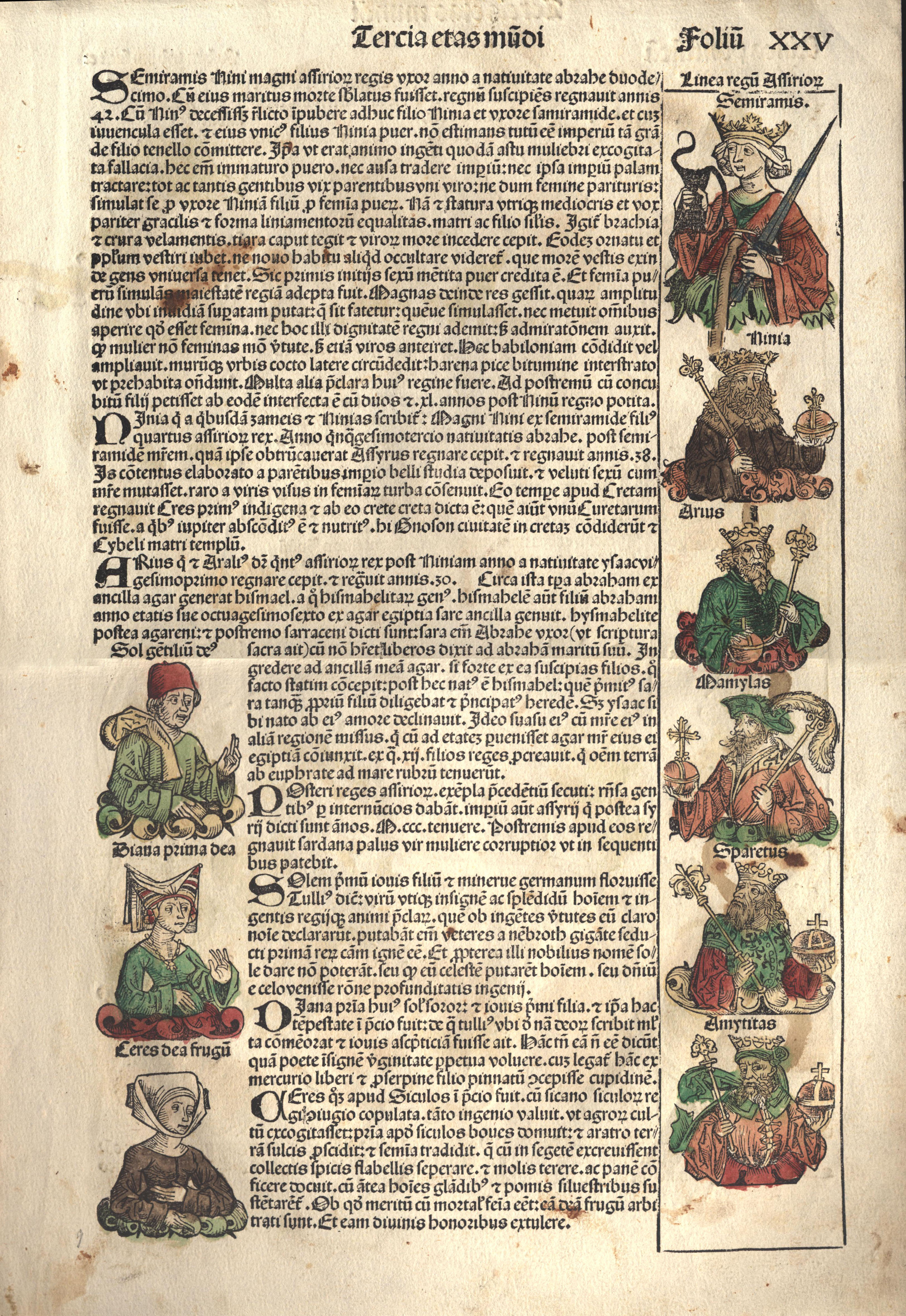
A page from the Nuremberg Chronicle, leaf 25 (page 49) printed by Anton Koberger circa 1492.

Of Koberger's many different printed editions which he produced from the late 15th century to the early 16th century, three stand out in particular. He printed an illustrated edition of the Bible in High German in 1483, complete with many remarkable woodcut illustrations. The text is from the first German Bible printed by Günther Zainer in the 1470s. Despite popular misconception, Martin Luther's celebrated translation of the Bible into Low German, i.e. Vernacular German, in the early 16th century was not the first German Bible, the Zainer edition appearing nearly 50 years before Luther's, and Koberger's editions of the same translation shortly thereafter. (Legend holds that Luther had approached initially Koberger's printing house to produce his translation of the Bible into German but the printing house declined the project. Scholars have speculated that the Koberger printing house might have continued well beyond 1526 had they accepted the project.) Koberger also printed an edition of the Golden Legend by Jacobus de Voragine in German in 1488, also illustrated with woodcuts of saints and religious themes. His most celebrated project is the so-called Nuremberg Chronicle of 1492, or Liber Chronicarum, probably the most extensively illustrated edition of the incunabula period, c. 1450–1500. Editions were produced in both Latin and German. The work was so popular, it is believed by scholars to have had one of the largest print-runs of the Incunabula Period. Because of the popularity, pirated editions appeared almost immediately after Koberger's edition.
