= Lamentation of Christ (Dürer, Munich) =

Painting by Albrecht Dürer, c.1500

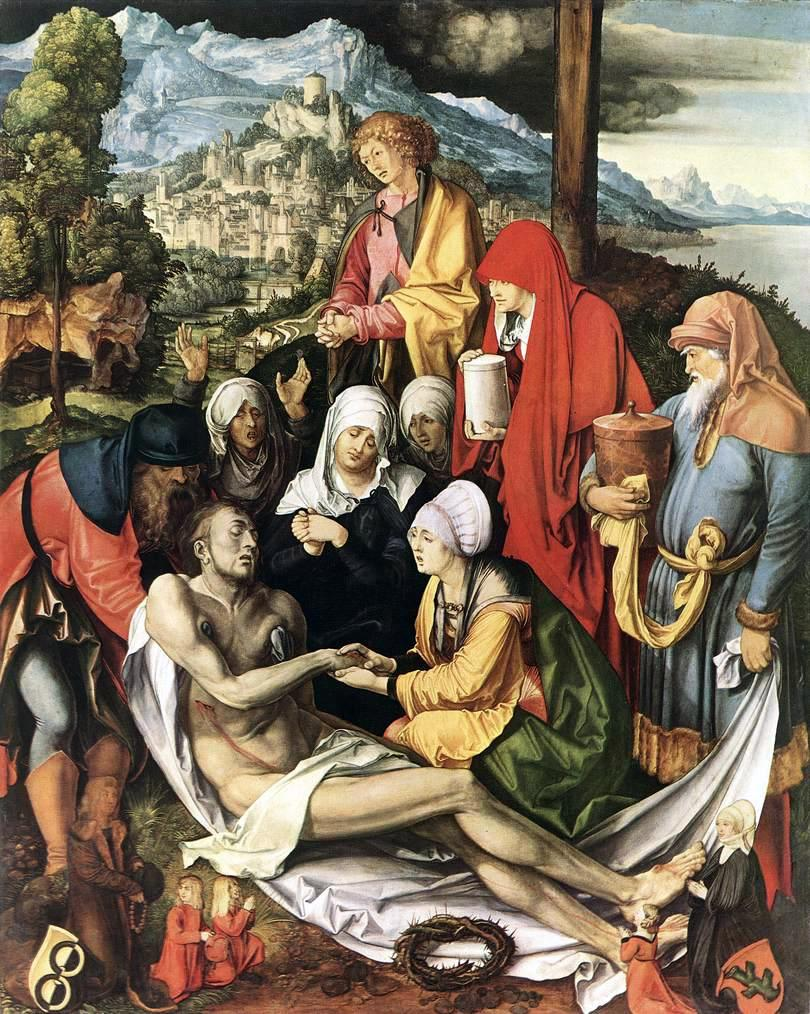
- Artist: Albrecht Dürer
- Year: c. 1500
- Medium: Oil on panel
- Dimensions: 151 cm × 121 cm (59 in × 48 in)
- Location: Alte Pinakothek, Munich

Lamentation of Christ (also known as Glimm Lamentation) is an oil-on-panel painting of the common subject of the Lamentation of Christ by the German Renaissance artist Albrecht Dürer, executed around 1500 and now in the Alte Pinakothek of Munich, Germany.

The work was commissioned by goldsmith Jakob Glimm as a memorial of his first wife, Margaret Holzmann, who had died in 1500. The removal of later re-painting in 1924 showed the original figures of the donors (Glimm and his three children) and of the dead woman, depicted in far smaller proportions than the religious characters.

== Description ==
The painting shows the dead Jesus, held by Joseph of Arimathea and surrounded by the Pious Women, including an aged and distraught Mary. In the right part are three standing characters depicted on a diagonal line: from top, St. John the Evangelist, Mary Magdalene, and Nicodemus, the last two holding vases which contained balms used to prepare the corpse for the burial.

== See also ==
- Lamentation of Christ (Dürer, Nuremberg)
- List of paintings by Albrecht Dürer

== Sources ==
- Costantino Porcu, ed. (2004). Dürer. Milan: Rizzoli.
