= Haller Madonna =

Painting by Albrecht Dürer, 1496 to 1499

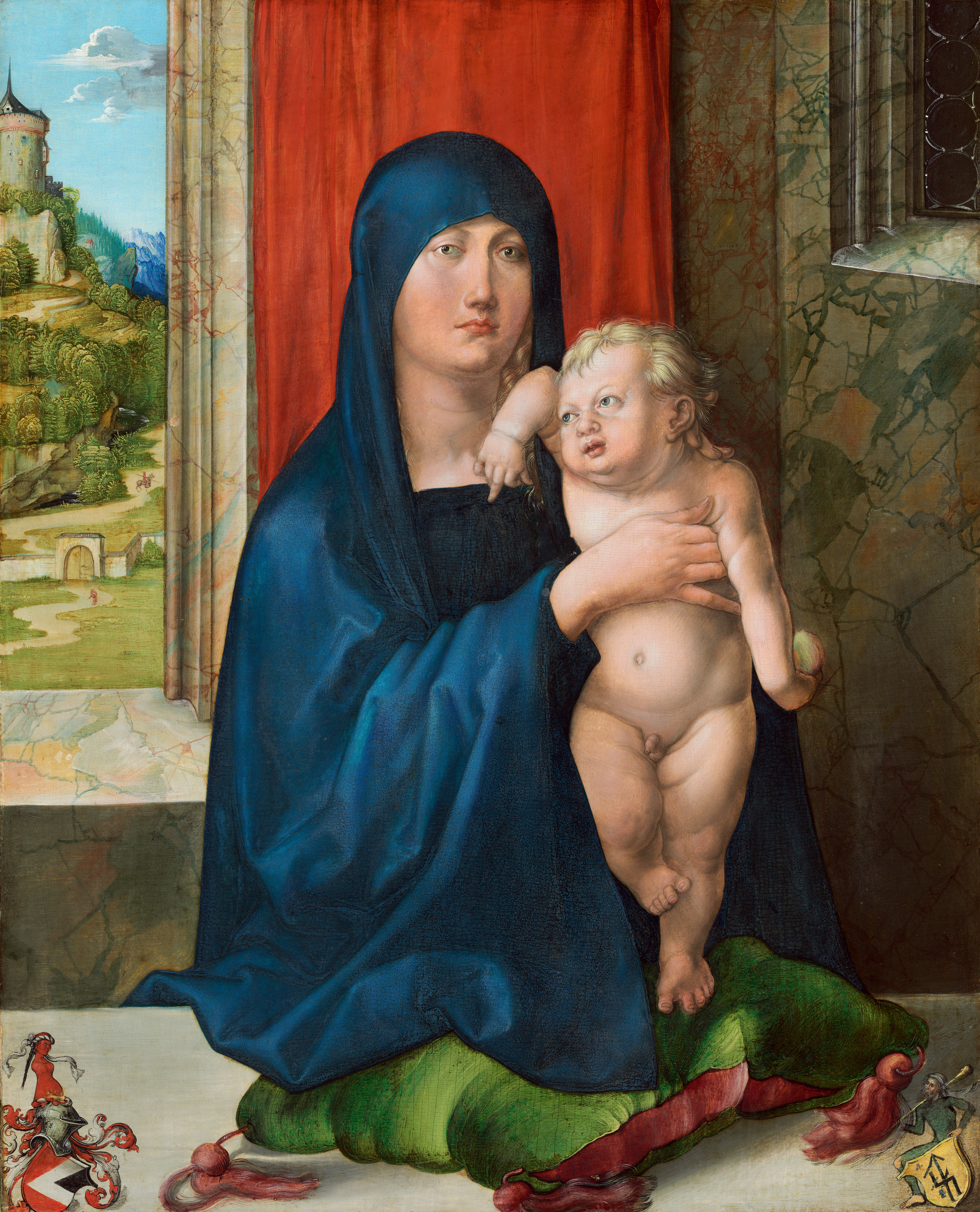
- Artist: Albrecht Dürer
- Year: before 1505
- Medium: Oil on panel
- Dimensions: 50 cm × 40 cm (20 in × 16 in)
- Location: National Gallery of Art, Washington, D.C.

The Haller Madonna is an oil painting by the German Renaissance artist Albrecht Dürer, dating to between 1496 and 1499. It is now in the National Gallery of Art, Washington, DC. The reverse also contains a full Dürer painting, entitled Lot and His Daughters.

== Description ==
The Haller Madonna painting on the obverse depicts Mary and an athletic-looking, jowly Jesus, with a window looking out to a distant view. This scheme is similar to that of Giovanni Bellini's works, which Dürer had seen in his first sojourn in Venice (1494–1495).

It features coats of arms in the lower corners, both representing prominent families from Dürer's home town of Nuremberg, Germany. The left-hand arms are those of the patrician family Haller von Hallerstein while the right-hand arms (technically a mason's mark) symbolize the Koberger family which came from the artisan class. It has therefore been suggested that the painting was commissioned by (or for) Wolf Haller and his wife Ursula Koberger, probably intended for private devotion. The daughter of the printer Anton Koberger (publisher of the famous Nuremberg Chronicle, a landmark of incunabula) had married the young nobleman in 1491. Anton Koberger was Dürer's godfather and neighbor, he may have commissioned the painting as a gift for his daughter who had risen to the patriciate. Wolf Haller initially entered his father-in-law's business as a helper and traveler, but after a few years he fell out with him and fled to Vienna, where he died in 1505.

In the mid-20th century the work belonged to the Thyssen-Bornemisza Collection in Lugano (Switzerland). It was acquired by Samuel Kress, who later donated it to the American museum of Washington. When the painting was sold on the antiques market, it was attributed to Bellini; it was later assigned to the German painter due to the style of the landscape and the posture of the child, typical of northern European painting. The child holds a fruit, a symbol of the Original Sin; the red padding of the cushion, as well as the tassels, perhaps symbolize the blood of Jesus' Passion.

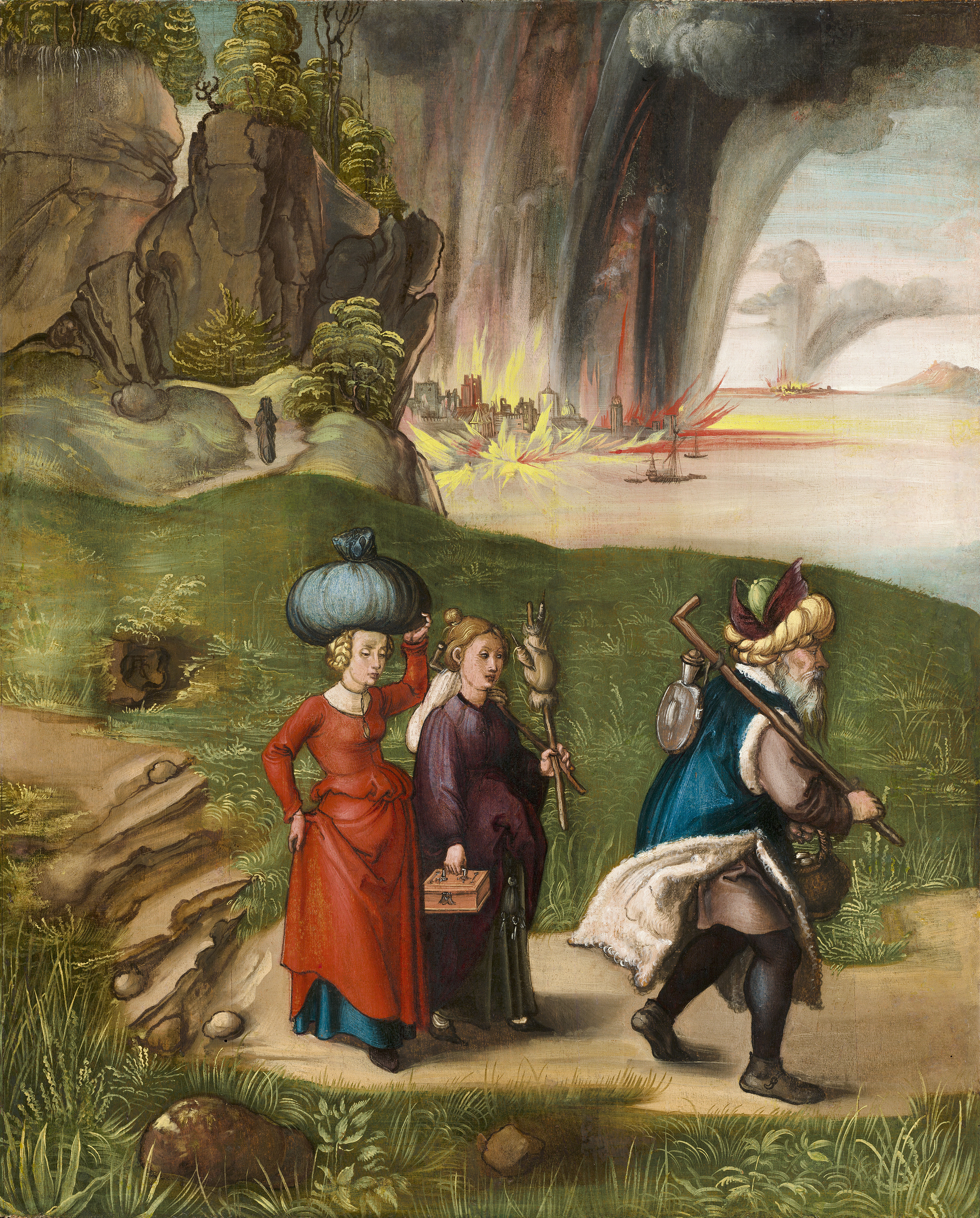
Lot's Flight, reverse of the panel.

The reverse of the painting is also painted, with a picture known as Lot and His Daughters, showing a Biblical scene of Lot's flight from Sodom. It includes a landscape and a seascape with explosions of fire in the background. Since the two scenes on either side of the artwork are unrelated, it has been suggested that the paintings are intended as private devotional images, each depicting one example of a just life and God's grace. Another interpretation is that the panel was originally part of a diptych showing also the donor, with Lot and his children in the left panel.

== See also ==
- List of paintings by Albrecht Dürer
