= List of paintings by Albrecht Dürer =

The following is an incomplete list of paintings by the German painter and engraver Albrecht Dürer.

== Legend for the table ==
The reproductions are coming for the most part from the online catalogues of the institution the work is held (or at least the best reproductions available on Wikimedia Commons). Articles at the beginning of some titles are dropped for better sortability. Paintings that belong together are not always joined, except for the occasional back sides of paintings. Secondary specifications are in small font. The original medium is mentioned first and stated as just "color", if there is no specific statement that the medium was actually proven to be oil; modifications that represent the current state are stated subsequently. In the case of Dürer the time spans are not likely to represent the duration spent working on the picture, instead usually signifies the (ideally most recent) estimated date by scholars for a work, that has no year stated by Dürer's own hand (usually with his monogram "AD") and/or decisive source. The small types under the date indicate at least some identification and are to be read as follows:

- d : original date by Dürer's hand on the panel at the time of the work's completion
- m : original monogram "AD" by Dürer's hand on the panel
- + : dated and signed with full name (with or without monogram), and additional text in German or Latin. Text and translation are quoted as reference.
- i : date and monogram with occasionally additional text veristically integrated into the picture (e. g. in form of a painted piece of written paper or a plate, often held by Dürer himself)
- p : preparatory drawings have survived
- w : sourced by Dürer's own writing or other trusted written testimony, like communal archives, letters by contemporaries or collection inventories, that scholars universally agree upon
- ^{l} : later dated, monogrammed or inscribed by Dürer's hand ("m^{l}w" would mean no date, later monogram, documented by written sources)
- ^{f} : anything of a different hand than Dürer's of a (most probably always) later date (e. g. "d^{f}w^{f}" means later date and text by a foreign hand)
- ^{c} : authenticity challenged by several scholars and not yet invalided (e. g. "m^{c}w" would mean the work is well sourced but the monogram seemed to be for some students not by Dürer's hand)
- — : not signed or referenced anywhere, still the attribution to Dürer solely on stylistical grounds is universally accepted ("—^{c}" if challenged)
- c : not signed or referenced anywhere, however known through copies

For the current location the city is mentioned first, it is most unambiguous and allows to combine multiple galleries of that city. The gallery where the work is displayed is mentioned second, followed by the name of the actual superordinate collection owning the work (on first appearance in the list only). The inventory number of the object in brackets is (ideally) linked to the entry in the online catalogue of the collection if available. The last column gives the number of the catalogue raisonné of Dürer's paintings, which Fedja Anzelewsky, lifelong affiliated with the Kupferstichkabinett Berlin, compiled and published in 1971, and revised 20 years later. The legend for the four different capitals following the chronological numbering is as follows:

- K ("Kopie") only survived as copy
- V ("verschollen") for lost but known through writings
- Z ("Zeichnung") painting that only survived in drawings
- W ("Werkstatt") workshop painting

Image	Title	Year	Medium	Dimensions h × w in cm	Location, Gallery, Collection (Inv. nr.)	CR nr.
	Portrait of Dürer's Father diptych, right wing back side: Combined Coat of Arms of the Dürer and Holper Families	1490 dm^{l}w^{c}	Oil on panel	47.5 × 39.5; 47 × 39	Florence, Uffizi (1086 (1890 post), 00286561)	2–3
	Portrait of Barbara Dürer diptych, left wing back side: "Rocky Landscape with Dragon", or "Hell resp. Purgatory scene"	1490 —w	Oil on panel	47.2 × 35.7	Nuremberg, Germanisches Nationalmuseum, Bayerische Staatsgemäldesammlungen (Gm1160)	4; 4.1
	The Miraculous Salvation of a Drowned Boy in Bregenz	1497/98 —^{c}	Color on panel (spruce)	41.5 × 50	Kreuzlingen (Switzerland), Heinz Kisters Collection (no website)	5
	Christ as the Man of Sorrows back side: "Agate cut or Lightvision"	c. 1493 —	Oil, tempera and gilding on panel (pinewood)	30 × 19	Karlsruhe, Staatliche Kunsthalle (2183)	9 ∅
	Self-Portrait (Portrait of the Artist Holding a Thistle)	1493 d+c	Oil on parchment transferred to canvas	56.5 × 44.5	Paris, Musée du Louvre (RF 2382)	10
	Jesus Child as Redeemer	1493 dm	Bodycolor and gold on parchment	11.8 × 9.3	Vienna, Albertina ()	11
	Lion	1494 dm	Bodycolor, watercolor on parchment	12.6 × 17.2	Hamburg, Kunsthalle (23005)	12
	Virgin and Child before an Archway (Bagnacavallo Madonna)	c. 1495 —	Oil on panel	47.8 × 36.5	Mamiano di Traversetolo near Parma, Magnani-Rocca Foundation (?)	16
	Virgin and Child Before a Landscape	c. 1494/97 —	Oil on panel	89 × 74	Schweinfurt, private collection Georg Schäfer	17
	Seven Sorrows Polyptych	c. 1495/96 —wc	Oil on panel (pinewood)	63 × 44.5–46.5 each side panel 110 × 43.6 central panel	Dresden, Gemäldegalerie Alte Meister (1875–1881) (seven surrounding panels); Munich, Alte Pinakothek, Bayerische Staatsgemäldesammlungen (709) (central panel)	21–27; 20
	Saint Jerome in the Wilderness back side: Heavenly Scene	c. 1496 —	Oil on panel (pearwood)	23.1 × 17.4	London, National Gallery (NG6563)	14–15
	Portrait of Elector Frederick the Wise of Saxony	1496 m^{lf}	Tempera on canvas	76 × 57	Berlin, Gemäldegalerie, Berlin State Museums (557C)	19
	Dresden Altarpiece	1496	Tempera on canvas	114 × 45 each wing 114 × 96.5 central panel	Dresden, Gemäldegalerie Alte Meister (1869)	39–40 [c]
	Haller Madonna back side: Lot and His Daughters	c. 1496/99 +	Oil on panel	52.4 × 42.2	Washington, National Gallery of Art, Samuel H. Kress Collection (1952.2.16.a, b)	43–44
	Portrait of a Young Woman with Her Hair Down (formerly believed to be a Fürleger)	1497 —c	Watercolor on canvas (Tüchlein)	56.3 × 43.2	Frankfurt, Städel (937)	45K
	Portrait of a Young Woman with Her Hair Done Up (formerly believed to be a Fürleger)	1497 —c	Watercolor on canvas (Tüchlein)	56.5 × 43.1	Berlin, Gemäldegalerie (77.1)	46
	Portrait of a Man	1497/98 —	Color on parchment on panel (oakwood)	25.7 × 20.5	Kreuzlingen (Switzerland), Heinz Kisters Collection (no website)	47
	Portrait of Dürer's Father at 70 copy	1497 dm+c	Oil on panel (limewood)	51 × 40.3	London, National Gallery (NG1938)	48
	Self-Portrait at 26	1498 dm+wc	Oil on panel	52 × 41	Madrid, Museo del Prado (P021791)	49
	Lamentation (Holzschuher Lamentation)	1499/1500	Color on panel	150 × 120.6	Nuremberg, Germanisches Nationalmuseum (Gm165)	55
	Portrait of Oswolt Krell	1499 di	Color on panel (limewood)	49.7 × 38.9 central panel 49.4 × 15.7 (l); 49.8 × 15.6 (r)	Munich, Alte Pinakothek (WAF 230, 230 A, 230 B)	56–58
	Portrait of an Unknown Man in a Red Gown ("St Sebastian")	c. 1499 —	Oil on panel	52 × 40	Bergamo, Accademia Carrara (469 not found)	59
	Portrait of Hans Tucher diptych, left wing back side: Combined Coat-of-Arms of the Tucher and Rieter Families	1499	Oil on panel	28 × 24	Weimar, Schlossmuseum, Klassik Stiftung Weimar (G 31)	60–61
	Portrait of Felicitas Tucher (née Rieter) diptych, right wing	1499	Oil on panel	28 × 24	Weimar, Schlossmuseum (G 32)	62
	Portrait of Elsbeth Tucher (née Pusch) diptych, left wing with the Portrait of Nikolaus Tucher lost	1499 dm^{f}+	Color on panel (limewood)	29.1 × 23.3	Kassel, Gemäldegalerie Alte Meister, Wilhelmshöhe Palace, Hessen Kassel Heritage (GK 6)	63; 64/65V
	Self-Portrait with Fur-Trimmed Robe	1500 dm+wc	Color on panel (limewood)	67.1 × 48.9	Munich, Alte Pinakothek (537)	66
	Hercules Killing the Stymphalian Birds	1500^{f?}	Watercolor on canvas	84.5 × 107.5 cropped	Nuremberg, Germanisches Nationalmuseum (Gm 166)	67
	Paumgartner Altarpiece: Nativity; Georg Paumgartner as St George (inner left wing); Lukas Paumgartner as St Eustacius (inner right wing)	c. 1500	Oil on panel (firwood)	155 × 126.1 central panel, 157 × 60.4 each wing	Munich, Alte Pinakothek (702)	50–52; 53W, 54K
	Lamentation of Christ (Glim Lamentation)	1500/03 —w	Color on panel (spruce)	151.9 × 121.6	Munich, Alte Pinakothek (704)	70
	Madonna and Child at the Breast (Madonna lactans)	1503 dm	Oil on panel (limewood)	24.1 × 18.3	Vienna, Kunsthistorisches Museum (GG 846)	71
	Jabach Altarpiece outer panels: Job on the Dungheap or Job Taunted by His Wife; Piper and Drummer	c. 1503/04 —	Oil on panel (limewood)	94 × 51 (l); 94 × 57 (r) both truncated at top	Frankfurt, Städel (890) (left); Cologne, Wallraf-Richartz Museum (WRM 0369) (right)	72–73
	Jabach Altarpiece triptych wings (central panel lost): Saints Joseph and Joachim (l); Saints Simeon and Lazarus (r)	c. 1503/05 m	Color on panel	96.6 × 54.5 (l); 97 × 55.1 (r) both truncated at top	Munich, Alte Pinakothek (WAF 228 and WAF 229)	74–75
	Studies of a Boy's Head Inclined to the Right; Boy's Head Inclined to the Left	1506 —	Distemper over ink or charcoal on cloth doubled by paper	22.5 × 19.2; 23.1 × 17.9	Paris, Bibliothèque nationale de France (6, 7 (B-13 rés.))	78–79
	Adoration of the Magi	1504	Oil on panel	99 × 113.5	Florence, Uffizi	
	Portrait of a Man (Endres Dürer)	c. 1504 —	Oil on panel	43 × 29	Budapest, Museum of Fine Arts (142)	excuded^{c}
	Portrait of a Venetian Woman	1505 dmc	Oil on panel (spruce)	33 × 24.5	Vienna, Kunsthistorisches Museum (GG 6440)	92
	Salvator Mundi unfinished	1505	Oil on panel	58.1 × 47	New York, Metropolitan Museum of Art	
	Feast of the Rosary	1506 dmw	Oil on panel	162 × 192	Prague, Národní galerie (O 1552)	93
	Madonna with the Siskin	1506 dm+i	Oil on panel (poplar)	93.5 × 78.9	Berlin, Gemäldegalerie (557F)	94
	Portrait of a Young Venetian Woman	1506/07 m	Oil on panel (poplar)	28.5 × 21.5	Berlin, Gemäldegalerie (557G)	95
	Portrait of a Young Man	1506 dm+	Oil on panel	46 × 35	Genoa, Palazzo Rosso (PR 47)	96
	Portrait of Burkard von Speyer	1506 dm	Oil on panel	31.7 × 26	Berkshire, Windsor Castle, Royal Collection (RCIN 404418)	97
	Christ Among the Doctors	1506 dmi	Oil on panel (poplar)	64.3 × 80.3	Madrid, Museo Nacional Thyssen-Bornemisza (134 (1934.38))	98
	Portrait of a Young Man back side: Allegory of Avarice	1507 dm	Oil on panel (limewood)	35 × 29	Vienna, Kunsthistorisches Museum (GG 849)	99
	Portrait of a Young Girl (with a Red Beret)	1507 dmw	Color on parchment transferred to panel	32.5 × 22.3	Berlin, Gemäldegalerie, (557l)	102
	Adam and Eve	1507 m^{i} dmi	Oil on panel (pinewood)	209 × 81; 209 × 80	Madrid, Museo del Prado (P02177, P02178)	103–104
	Martyrdom of the Ten Thousand	1508 dmiwc	Oil on panel transferred to canvas	99 × 87.5	Vienna, Kunsthistorisches Museum (GG 835)	105
	Heller Altarpiece copy	1508/09	Oil and tempera on panel	189 × 138 central element	Frankfurt, Historical Museum	
	Holy Family	1509	Oil on panel	30.9 × 38.6	Rotterdam, Museum Boijmans Van Beuningen (2447 (OK))	116
	Adoration of the Trinity (Landauer Altar) with frame designed by Dürer	1511 dmi	Oil on panel (limewood)	135 × 123.4 (limewood); 147,7 × 135.4 (frame)	Vienna, Kunsthistorisches Museum (838)	118
	Madonna of the Pear	1512 dm	Oil on panel (limewood)	49.3 × 37.4	Vienna, Kunsthistorisches Museum (848)	120
	Emperor Charlemagne and Emperor Sigismund	c. 1512 —	Oil and tempera on panel	215 × 115 each, including frame	Nuremberg, Germanisches Nationalmuseum (Gm167 and Gm168)	123–124
	Virgin and Child	1516	Oil on panel (spruce)	27.9 × 18.7 (w/border 22.2)	New York, Metropolitan Museum of Art (17.190.5)	127
	Madonna of the Carnation	1516	Color on parchment mounted on pine wood (doubled with spruce)	39.7 × 29.3	Munich, Alte Pinakothek (4772)	130
	Portrait of Michael Wolgemut	1516 dm+c	Oil and tempera on panel (limewood)	29.8 × 28.1	Nuremberg, Germanisches Nationalmuseum (Gm885)	132
	Portrait of a Clergyman (Johann Dorsch?)	1516 dm	Oil on parchment transferred to fabric	41.7 × 32.7	Washington, National Gallery of Art, Samuel H. Kress Collection (1952.2.17)	133
	Apostles Philip and James	1516	Tempera on panel	45 × 38; 46 × 37	Florence, Uffizi (1089, 1890, 1099)	128–129
	Lucretia (The Suicide of Lucretia)	1518 dmpw	Color on panel (limewood)	168 × 74	Munich, Alte Pinakothek (705)	137
	Virgin Mary in Prayer	1518 dm	Oil on panel (limewood)	54.9 × 45.3	Berlin, Gemäldegalerie (557H)	138
	Virgin and Child with St Anne	1519	Oil on panel (limewood)	60 × 49.8	New York, Metropolitan Museum of Art (14.40.633)	147
	Portrait of Jakob Fugger the Wealthy	c. 1520 —p	Tempera on canvas (Tüchlein)	69.4 × 53	Augsburg, Staatsgalerie Altdeutsche Meister, Bavarian State Painting Collections (717)	143
	Portrait of Emperor Maximilian I of Habsburg	1519 —	Tempera on canvas	83 × 65	Nuremberg, Germanisches Nationalmuseum (Gm169)	145
	Portrait of Emperor Maximilian I	1519 dm	Oil on panel (limewood)	74 × 62	Vienna, Kunsthistorisches Museum (825)	146
	Portrait of a Man	1520 dm	Distemper on canvas mounted on paper	40 × 30.3	Paris, Musée du Louvre (INV 18598, Recto)	148
	Study for a Virgin Mary	c. 1520	Tempera on canvas	25.5 × 21.5	Paris, Bibliothèque nationale de France (B-13 rés.)	77
	Portrait of Bernhart von Reesen	1521	Oil on panel (oak wood)	45.5 × 31.5	Dresden, Gemäldegalerie Alte Meister (1871)	
	Portrait of a Man in a Fur Coat (Rodrigo de Almada?)	1521	Oil on panel	50.6 × 32.9	Boston, Isabella Stewart Gardner Museum (P21n10)	
	St. Jerome in His Study	1521	Oil on panel (oak wood)	59.5 × 48.5	Lisbon, Museum Nacional de Arte Antiga (828 Pint)	
	Portrait of a Man with Beret and Scroll	1521 dm	Oil on panel (oakwood)	50 × 36	Madrid, Museo del Prado (P002180)	165
	Virgin and Child with Saint Anne	1523	Oil on panel	75 × 64.5	Warsaw, Muzeum Kolekcji im. Jana Pawła II (Porczyński Gallery) (no website)	
	Madonna and Child with the Pear	1526	Oil on panel	43 × 31	Florence, Uffizi (1890, 1171)	
	Portrait of Jakob Muffel	1526 dm+	Oil on panel transferred to canvas	49.7 × 37.2	Berlin, Gemäldegalerie (557D)	178
	Portrait of Hieronymus Holzschuher with cover	1526 dm+	Oil on panel (limewood)	51 × 37.1	Berlin, Gemäldegalerie (557E, 557E/1)	179–180
	Portrait of Johann Kleberger	1526 dmi	Oil on panel (limewood)	36.5 × 36.5	Vienna, Kunsthistorisches Museum (850)	182
	The Four Apostles: Saints John and Peter; Saints Mark and Paul	1526	Color on panel	212.8 × 76.2 (l); 212.4 × 76.3 (r)	Munich, Alte Pinakothek (545, 540)	183–184
	Way to Calvary	1527	Oil on panel	32 × 47	Bergamo, Accademia Carrara	

== See also ==
- List of engravings by Albrecht Dürer
- List of woodcuts by Albrecht Dürer

== Sources ==
- Fedja Anzelewsky: Albrecht Dürer. Das malerische Werk. Deutscher Verlag für Kunstwissenschaft, Berlin 1971, ISBN 3-871-57-0400.
  - 2nd edition in two volumes, 1991, ISBN 3-871-57-1377.
- Norbert Wolf: Albrecht Dürer, Prestel, München 2010, ISBN 978-3-7913-4426-3.
