= Portrait of Jakob Fugger =

Painting by Albrecht Dürer, c.1520

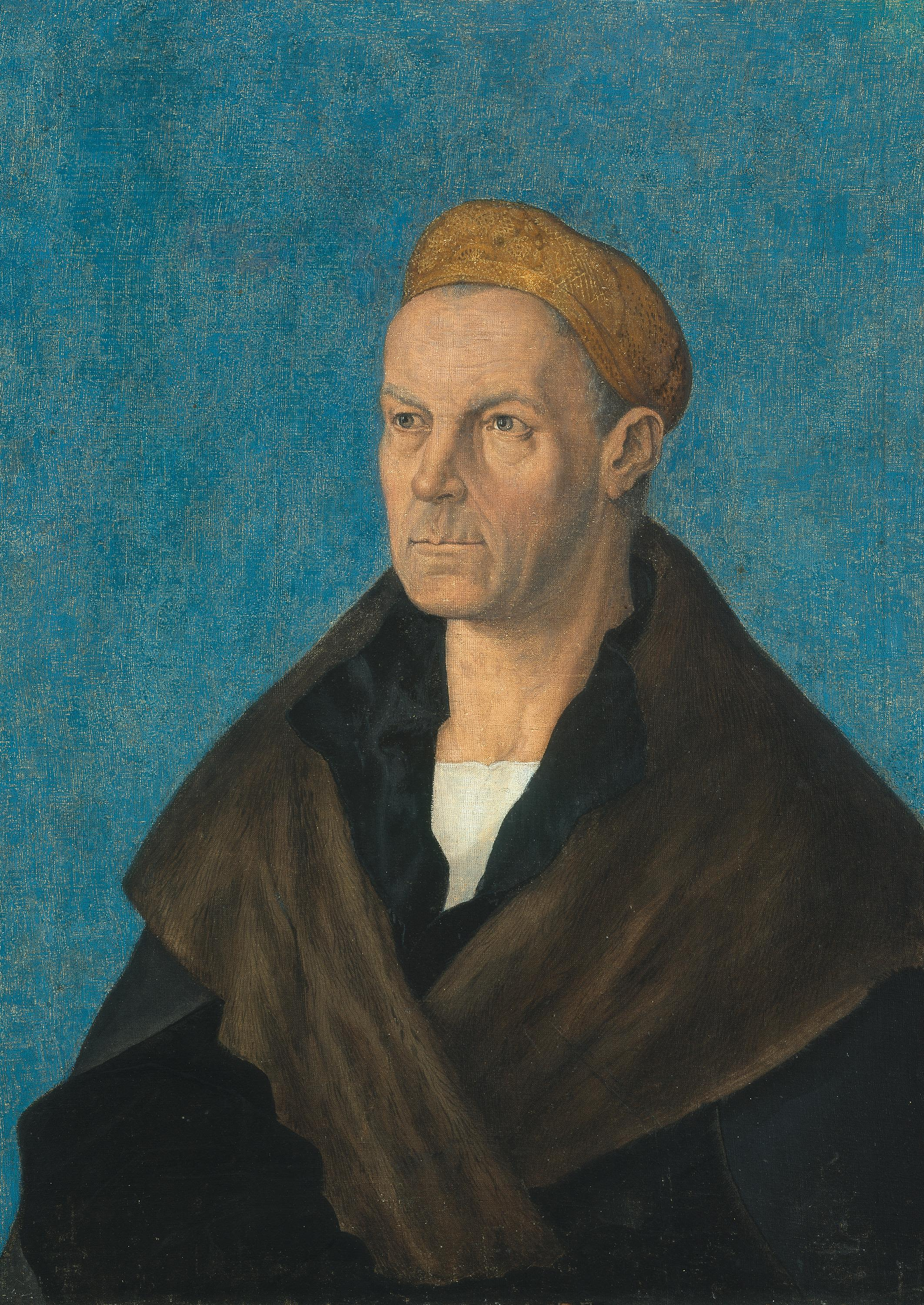
- Artist: Albrecht Dürer
- Year: c. 1520
- Type: Oil on canvas (so-called "Tüchlein")
- Dimensions: 69.4 cm × 53 cm (27.3 in × 21 in)
- Location: Staatsgalerie Altdeutsche Meister, Augsburg
- Owner: Bavarian State Painting Collections

The Portrait of Jakob Fugger is an oil painting by German Renaissance artist Albrecht Dürer, executed around 1520.

== History ==
Jakob Fugger was one of the richest merchants of Augsburg. He was portrayed by Dürer in 1518, when he had been called to the city by emperor Maximilian I, in the course of the Diet of Augsburg. Here the artist was part of delegation of his home city, Nuremberg, and met numerous personalities, including the Fugger with whom he was in good relationships since his second trip to Venice (1506–1507). The artist, however, executed the portrait later, around 1520.

== Description ==
Dürer portrayed Fugger's bust from three-quarters, looking to the left, above a blue background. The man wears a finely embroidered hat on his head, and a wide coat with fur-lining, as a show of his high social status.

== See also ==
- List of paintings by Albrecht Dürer
