= Hieronymus Münzer =

Humanist and physician

Hieronymus Münzer or Monetarius (1437/47 – 27 August 1508) was a Renaissance humanist, physician and geographer who made a famous grand tour of the Iberian Peninsula in 1494–95. He was co-author of the Nuremberg Chronicle.

== Life ==
Münzer was born in Feldkirch. His parents were Heinrich (died 1463?) and Elisabeth Münzer. Hieronymus Münzer studied from 1464 on at the University of Leipzig and in 1470 was appointed Magister there and held private lectures. In addition, he also studied medicine, and after a short spell teaching at the Latin school in Feldkirch in 1476, he continued studying in Pavia, becoming doctor of medicine there in 1477. He settled that year as a doctor in Nuremberg. Here in 1479 he wrote his work Libellus de natura vini (booklet on the nature of wine) and various medical reports. He was one of the main figures in the humanist circle of the city and worked intensively in cosmography and astronomy.

As a participant in the trading company of his brother Ludwig (died 1518) he was a rich man, using his money to establish amongst other things a comprehensive library. In 1480 he acquired Nuremberg citizenship and 3 July married Dorothea Kieffhaber (died 1505). Their daughter Dorothea married Dr. Hieronymus Holzschuher, whose son of the same name was painted by Albrecht Dürer. They also had at least two sons. In 1483 Münzer fled from the plague to Italy, bought numerous books in Rome, Naples and Milan, and returned home the following year. In 1484 he also travelled to the Netherlands. In 1494/95 he undertook a longer journey around Western Europe. Münzer died on 27 August 1508 in Nuremberg, and was buried there in the church of St. Sebald. He left behind an enormous fortune, much of which came from his partnership in the trading business of his brother Ludwig (owner of Gwiggen Castle in 1507).

== Work ==
Münzer was a friend of Hartmann Schedel (1440–1514) and contributed geographical sections to the latter's Nuremberg Chronicle of 1493, including the first printed map of Germany, which appeared in two-sided form. In 1493, his close contacts with the Nuremberg merchant Martin Behaim led Münzer to suggest to the King of Portugal on behalf of Emperor Maximilian a journey across the Atlantic in search of the route to India, recommending Behaim for the task.

In 1494, again escaping the plague, he undertook a long journey with three younger companions from Nuremberg and Augsburg. They travelled from Nuremberg, largely on horseback, possibly for some 7,000 miles in all through Germany and Switzerland, down the Rhône to Provence, Languedoc and Roussillon, and across the Pyrenees. They travelled through eastern and southern Spain into Portugal, back into Spain, and then into France again, then northwards through France and Belgium to Cologne, and down the Rhine and Main back to Nuremberg. Münzer's report of this trip is written in Latin, with the title Itinerarium siue peregrinatio excellentissimi viri artium ac vtriusque medicine doctoris Hieronimi Monetarii de Feltkirchen ciuis Nurembergensis. The report exists today only as a copy and is preserved in a codex of Hartmann Schedel (Munich, Bayerische Staatsbibliothek, Clm 431, fol. 96-274v.). The report has been widely used by historians in the countries he visited, and the whole was published in an English translation, with full critical notes, in 2014. An annotated new edition of the Latin text exists, as does a German translation of the entire report in the context of a project at the University of Erlangen-Nuremberg.

Münzer commented on numbers of great churches and monasteries, their relics, and often their clergy. The places about which he tells us much include Marseille, then a small port ruined twenty years before by a Catalan fleet; Barcelona, which had been rich and self-governing, but had lost many of its merchants to Valencia in the Catalan civil war in the 1460s; Montserrat, a great Benedictine monastery; Poblet, a great Cistercian one; and Scala Dei, a small new Franciscan one. Valencia was flourishing and numbers of Muslims lived in the area; south of Valencia there was good water. Alicante exported alum for textile makers, dried fruit, nuts and wine. Almería had been a wealthy Muslim port and its chief mosque became a cathedral after the kingdom of Granada was conquered. He was one of the first Christian travellers to visit Granada after its capture in 1492 by the Catholic rulers Ferdinand and Isabella. Granada was the chief object of Münzer's tour and he met there both the royal governor, a distinguished diplomat and soldier, and the saintly new archbishop. He rode through Málaga to Seville, where he spent several days; the city was the base of Spain's shipping trade with the Indies and South America.

Over the border in Portugal he talked with John II in Évora and spent five days in Lisbon, learning what he wrote about in his Discovery of Guinea. Further north, he entered Spain again, visiting Santiago de Compostela, the University at Salamanca and the great Jeronimite monastery at Guadalupe. In Madrid he met King Ferdinand and Queen Isabella, afterwards travelling through Zaragoza and Pamplona into France again.

In Toulouse he commented on the mills of the Garonne, the woad trade and schism in the Church. Poitiers had a university and numbers of learned officials. In Amboise he talked at length with the aged Francis of Paola, who died shortly after and was soon canonised. Orléans also had a university, which lawyers preferred to Paris as its degrees were just as good and cheaper; trade along the Loire was important. Paris, far the largest northern city, kept him for several days: as well as its churches, their relics and treasures, he commented on the famous university, its colleges and the Sorbonne’s library; on the part of the city where lawyers, merchants and artisans lived and the Parlement was located; and on how the enormous city was fed. The abbey of Saint Denis where French kings were crowned was not far away: it had splendid treasures. Down the Seine he commented on Rouen, the wine port, and then on Dieppe on the coast, and on the pirates in the English Channel and North Sea who caused him to abandon his planned visit to England. Along the Somme he visited well-defended Amiens, the capital of Picardy, and met the Captain of Picardy and from there travelled into the Duke of Burgundy's lands.

Arras had been worn down by wars between the King of France and Duke of Burgundy. In Lille Münzer visited the castle where the Duke kept his treasure and artillery. He then went on to Bruges, where merchants of all northern lands had met and traded, but it rebelled against Archduke Maximilian, the young heir's father and guardian, and was about to lose its predominance to the great port city of Antwerp. Sluys, the port of Bruges, suffered in the same events. Ghent, the capital of all Flanders, was ruled by factions whose unstable politics caused the city to decline. Mechlin, which he visited next, was where the ducal family resided: there was sumptuous linen in the main church and a famous, large convent of Béguines there. The last Belgian city he visited was Liège. Its troublesome citizens rebelled against their lord, an authoritarian bishop, in 1468 and were savagely repressed by the Duke of Burgundy's troops, who sacked the city: the city recovered despite the Duke's ill will. Münzer went on through Aachen to Cologne in German-speaking lands: the linguistic frontier ran north from Swiss Fribourg to Liège and the west to the sea at Boulogne. French was spoken to the west and south, and German or Dutch to the east and north.

Münzer is less informative about the German lands than about the Iberian and French. He passed through Aachen, where emperors had been crowned ever since Charlemagne’s son. Cologne was ruled by its archbishop, an elector of the Empire. The archbishop of Mainz was also an elector. Münzer did not mention the war in 1462 between the citizens and the archbishop, who repressed them savagely. He visited Worms during a Reichstag in 1495, one of the two during the reign of Emperor Maximilian, who had previously ruled the Low Countries as his young son’s guardian. On the Main he visited Frankfurt, scene of important fairs which no German merchant could afford to miss. Thence to Würzburg, where he met the aged bishop Rudolf, who had rescued the diocese from insolvency, and then home to Nuremberg, where he found his family well. He died in Nuremberg

== Selected works ==
- Itinerarium siue peregrinatio excellentissimi viri artium ac vtriusque medicine doctoris Hieronimi Monetarii de Feltkirchen ciuis Nurembergensis (journey 1494/95; date of publication unclear). The Latin text of all Hieronymous Münzer’s Itinerarium except the Iberian section was published by Ernst Philip Goldschmidt in four sections in Humanisme et Renaissance, Vol. VI (1939) as ‘Le voyage de Hieronymus Monetarius à travers la France’. The Latin text of the Iberian section of the Itinerarium was published by Ludwig Pfandl in Revue Hispanique (1920) 48 as ‘Itinerarium Hispanicum Hieronymi Monetarii’.
- De inventione Africae maritimae et occidentalis videlicet Geneae per Infantem Heinricum Portugalliae, ed. v. Friedrich Kunstmann, in: Abhandlungen der historischen Classe der königlich bayerischen Akademie der Wissenschaften, Bd. 7, München 1855, S. 291–362 (Einleitung 291–347). The Latin text with Portuguese translation was also published by Basilio de Vasconcelos in 1932 in O Instituto.
