= The Suicide of Lucretia (Dürer) =

1518 painting by Albrecht Dürer

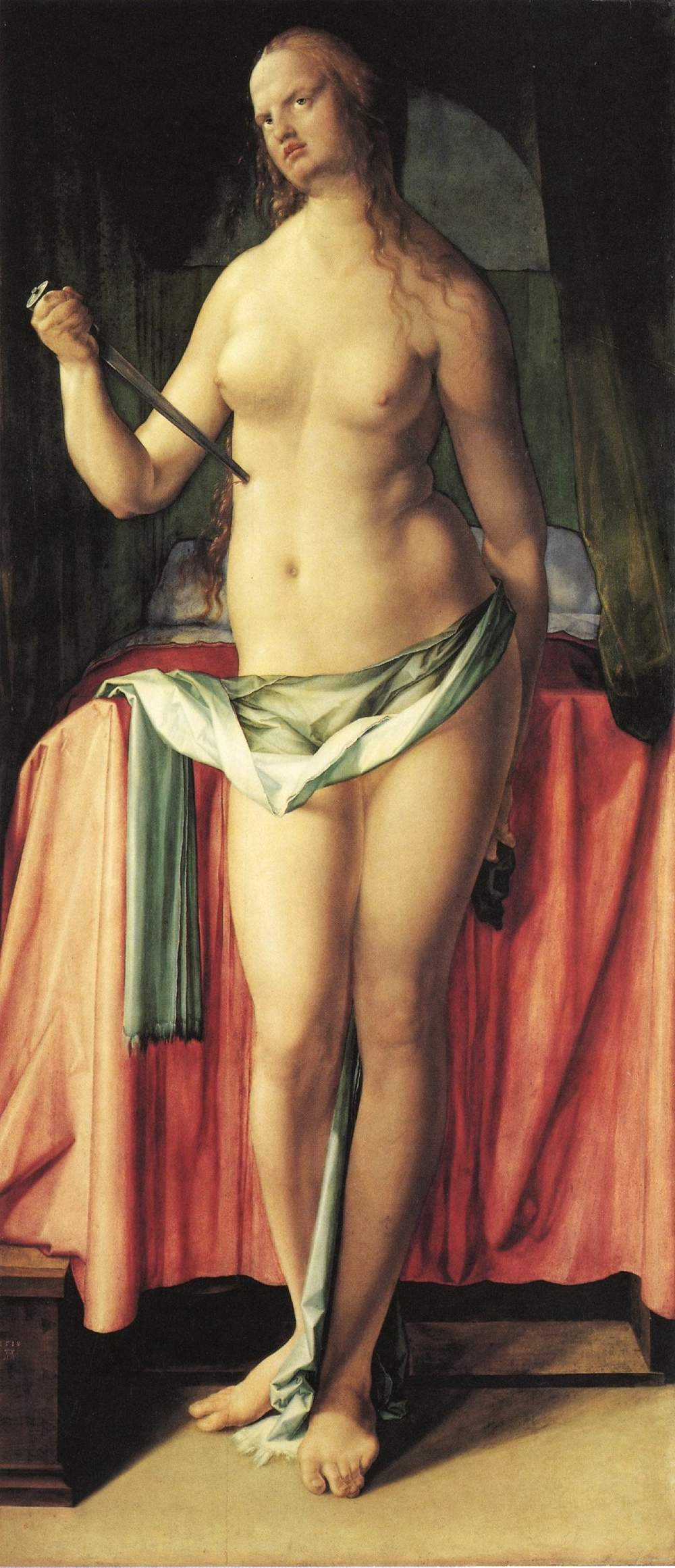
The Suicide of Lucretia, 168 × 75 cm. Alte Pinakothek Munich

The Suicide of Lucretia is an oil on lime panel painting by Albrecht Dürer, signed and dated 1518, in the collection of the Alte Pinakothek, Munich. It shows the Ancient Rome heroine Lucretia (died c. 510 BC), wife of Lucius Tarquinius Collatinus, in a tall and narrow framing, in the act of killing herself rather than face the shame of being raped by her cousin Sextus Tarquinius.

The panel is Dürer's second treatment of Lucretia, following a very similar 1508 drawing. The earlier composition, drawn in ink with wash on paper, is in the Albertina museum, Vienna.

== Description ==
Lucretia stands in front of a cramped and harshly lit room containing the bridal bed on which she was raped. She looks to the sky as if asking the gods to witness her suicide. Her face betrays feelings of disgrace as she stabs herself with a sword to the belly.

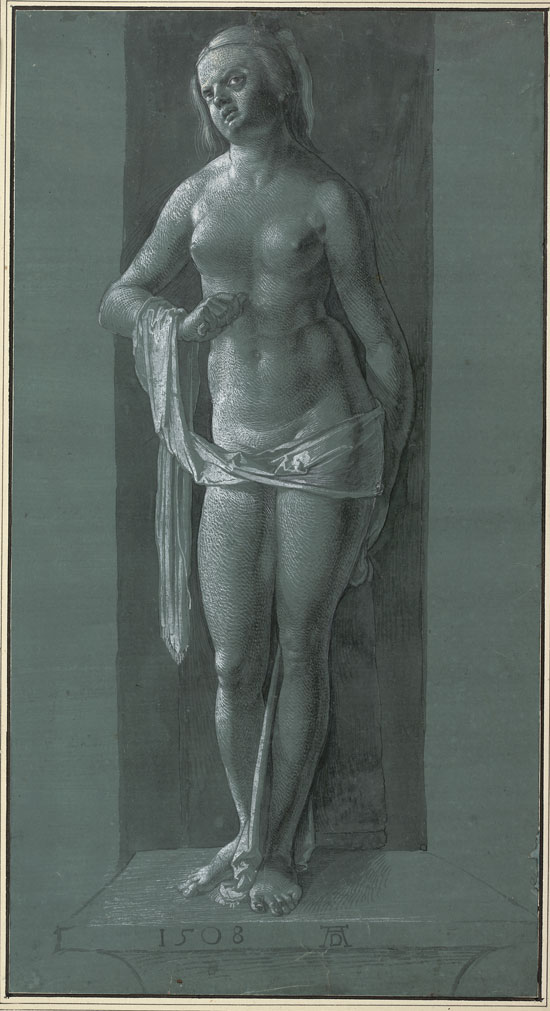
The Suicide of Lucretia, 1508, brush and gray and black ink, gray wash, 42.3 × 22.6 cm. Albertina, Vienna

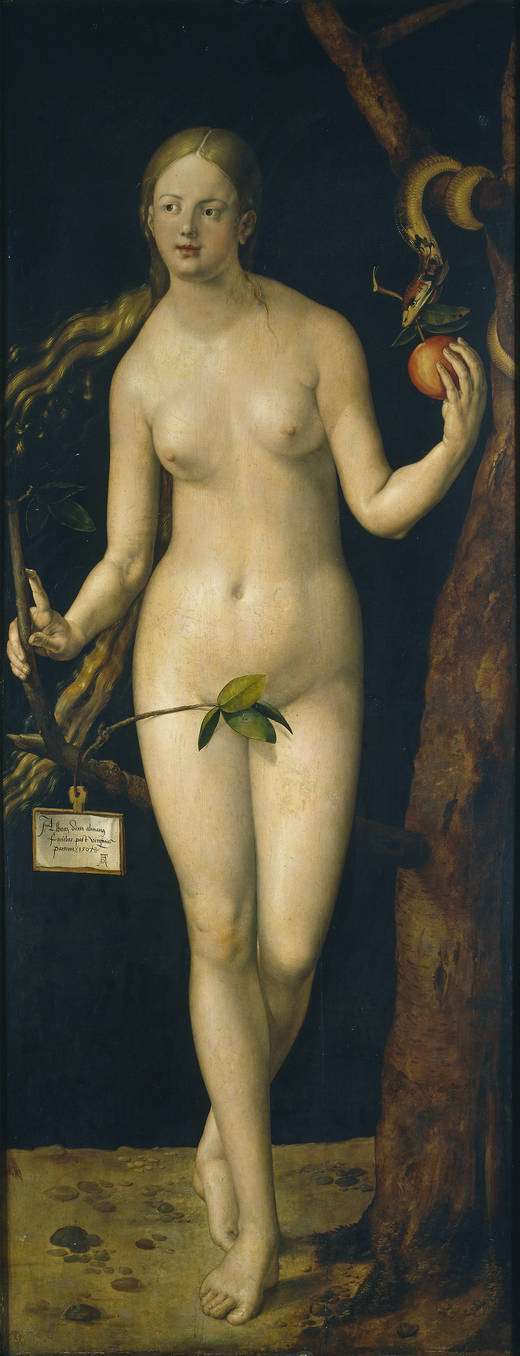
Adam and Eve, 1507, Prado, Madrid

Her wound is not at the center of her belly, as in the 1508 drawing, but below her right breast, echoing Christ's lance wound. Critics have mentioned how the act is bloodless, without any of the spatterings on bed sheets usually associated with similar treatments from the time. However the painting was executed with finesse, with the brush strokes representing the cloths especially detailed, and composed of a variety of red, blue, and green pigments. The white drapery around her hips is a later addition from around 1600.

Art historians tend not to view it as one of his best paintings, and it is often compared, unfavourably, to a similar work by Lucas Cranach the Elder. However, art historians see the Dürer as a less formal treatment, more inward and concerned with confronting death and dying.

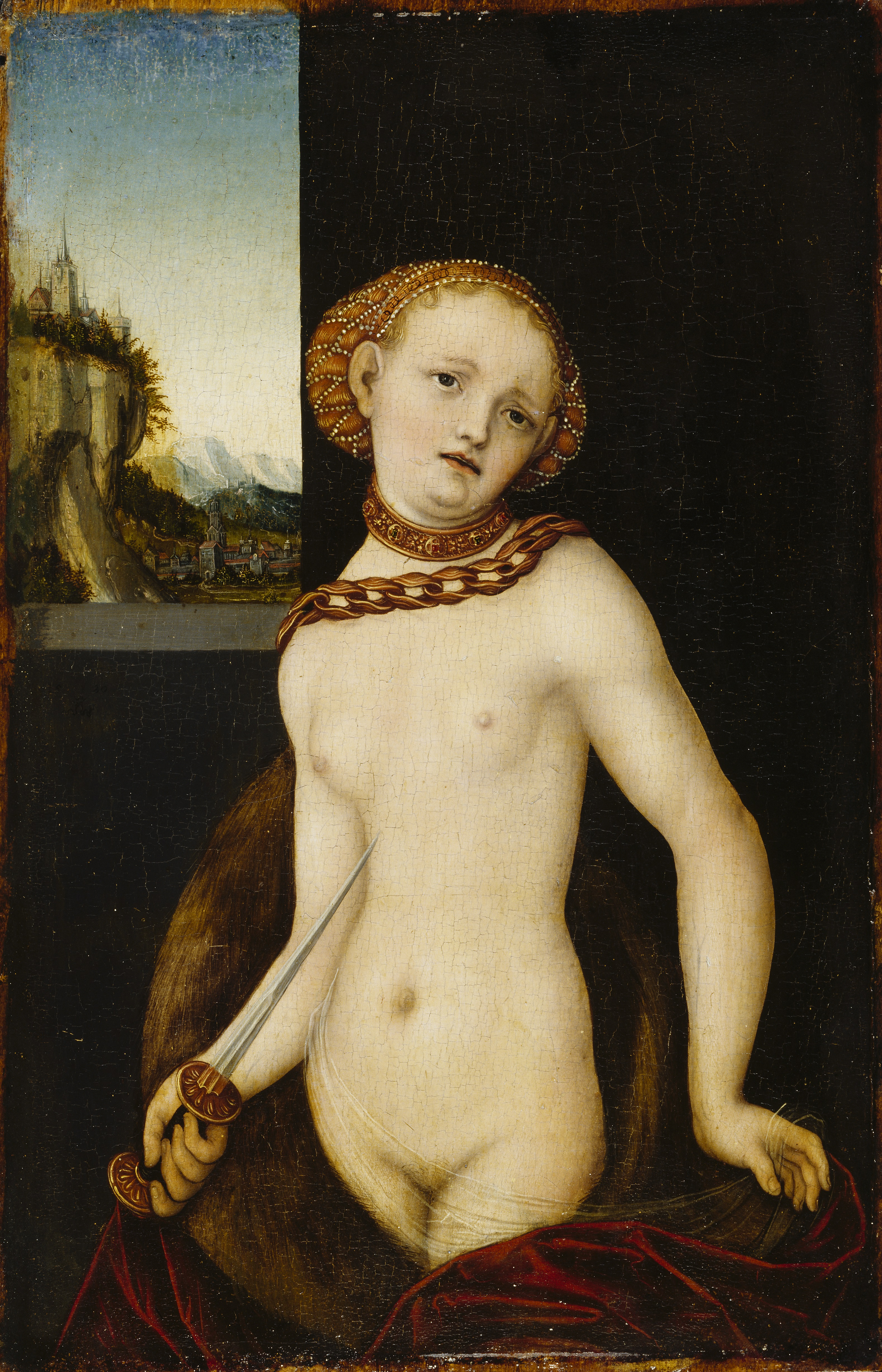
Lucretia, Lucas Cranach the Elder, 1530, Sinebrychoffin taidemuseo, Helsinki

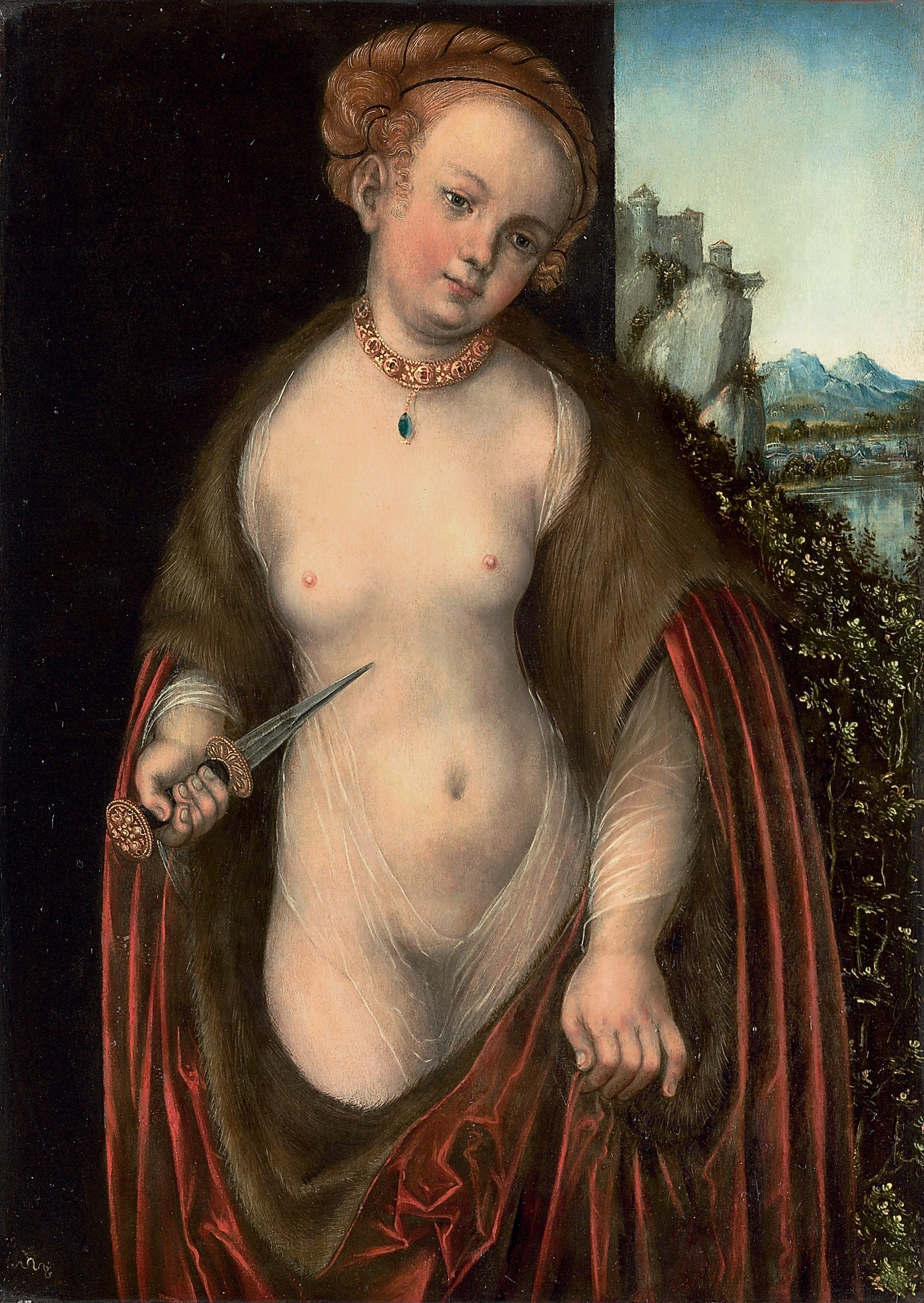
Lucretia, Lucas Cranach the Elder, 1525–30 (before 1537). Private collection

Her face bears elements of idealisation, although for the most part she is presented as a real woman. Her expression, near identical to the 1508 drawing, is difficult to interpret, as it contains none of the passivity, chastity, or sly sidelong glances usually associated with contemporary depictions of her.

She is given a monumental and statuesque pose, but without the sense of pagan sensuality present in his 1507 Adam and Eve in the Prado, Madrid. Critics have remarked unfavourably on her sour expression, unnaturally elongated and disproportional figure, and uncomfortable contrapposto pose. The painting has been described as one of Dürer's most unpopular works, with many art historians, including Max Friedländer and Erwin Panofsky, commenting unfavourably on apparent qualities such as "austerity and awkwardness". Art historian Fedja Anzelewsky described her as "a parody rather than an exaltation of the classical feminine figure."

The feminist scholar Linda Hults observes how "there is a mechanical quality to Lucretia's suicidal gesture; it seems to operate apart from her facial expression, and it does not seem to require the assistance of her other arm, which is oddly placed behind her back."

== Related works ==
Between 1959 and 1960, Alberto Giacometti completed a Sketch after Durer's Lucretia using ball-point pen on paper.

== See also ==
- List of paintings by Albrecht Dürer

== Sources ==
- Bubenik, Andrea. Reframing Albrecht Dürer: The Appropriation of Art, 1528-1700. Routledge, 2013. ISBN 978-1-4094-3847-2
- Hults, Linda. "Dürer's "Lucretia": Speaking the Silence of Women". Signs, Volume 16, No. 2, Winter, 1991
- Panofsky, Erwin. The Life and Art of Albrecht Dürer. Princeton University Press, 1945
- Sander, Jochen. "Dürer in Frankfurt". In: Dürer: His Art in Context. Frankfurt: Städel Museum & Prestel, 2013. ISBN 3-7913-5317-9
