= Portrait of a Venetian Woman =

1505 painting by Albrecht Dürer

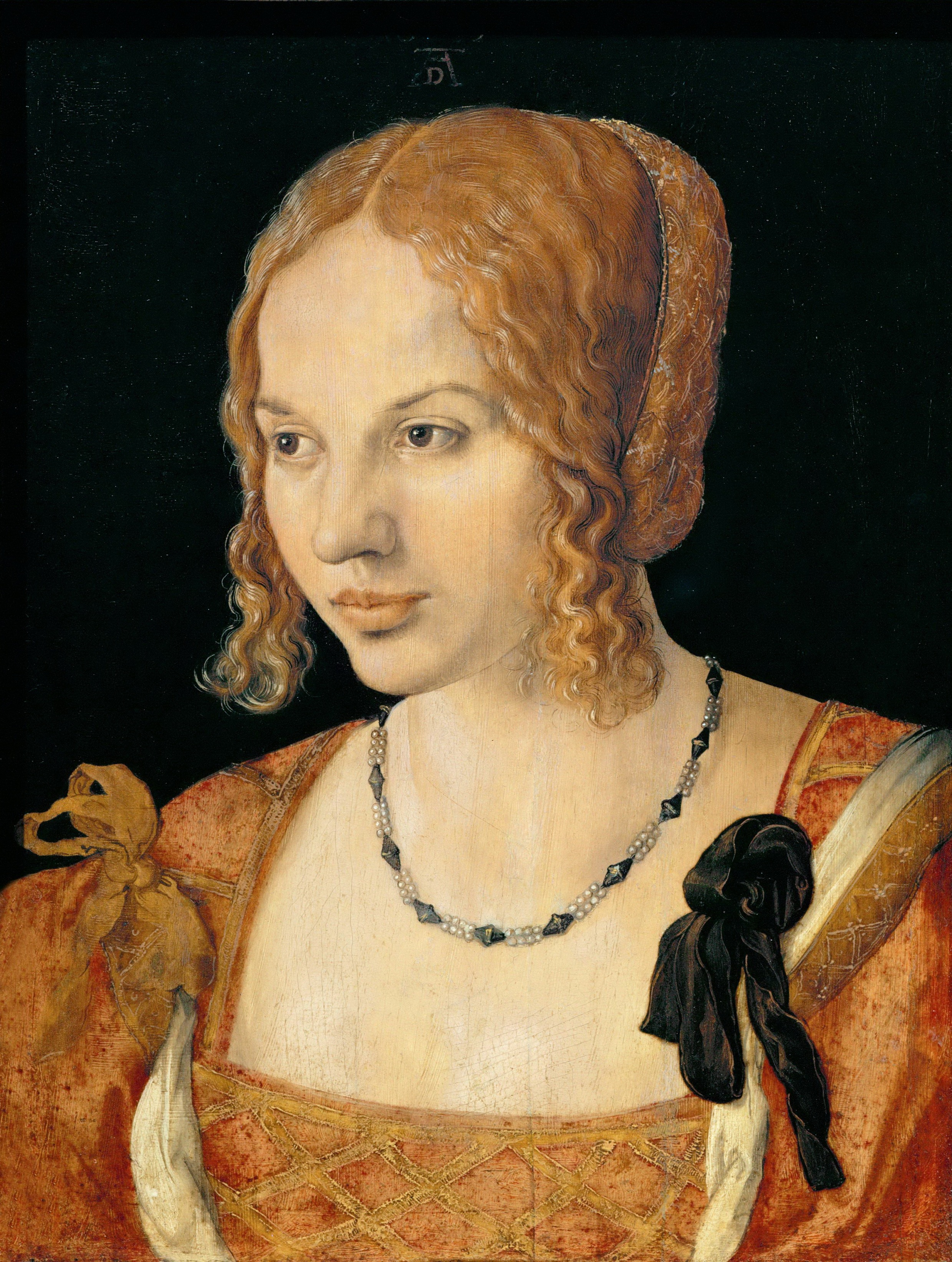
Portrait of a Young Venetian Woman, 1505. Kunsthistorisches Museum, Vienna. 35 x 26 cm.

Portrait of a Young Venetian Woman is a small bust-length oil on elm panel painting by the German artist Albrecht Dürer from 1505. It was painted, along with several other high-society portraits, during Dürer's second visit to Italy.

The painting was featured in the 1980 BBC Two series 100 Great Paintings.

== Description ==
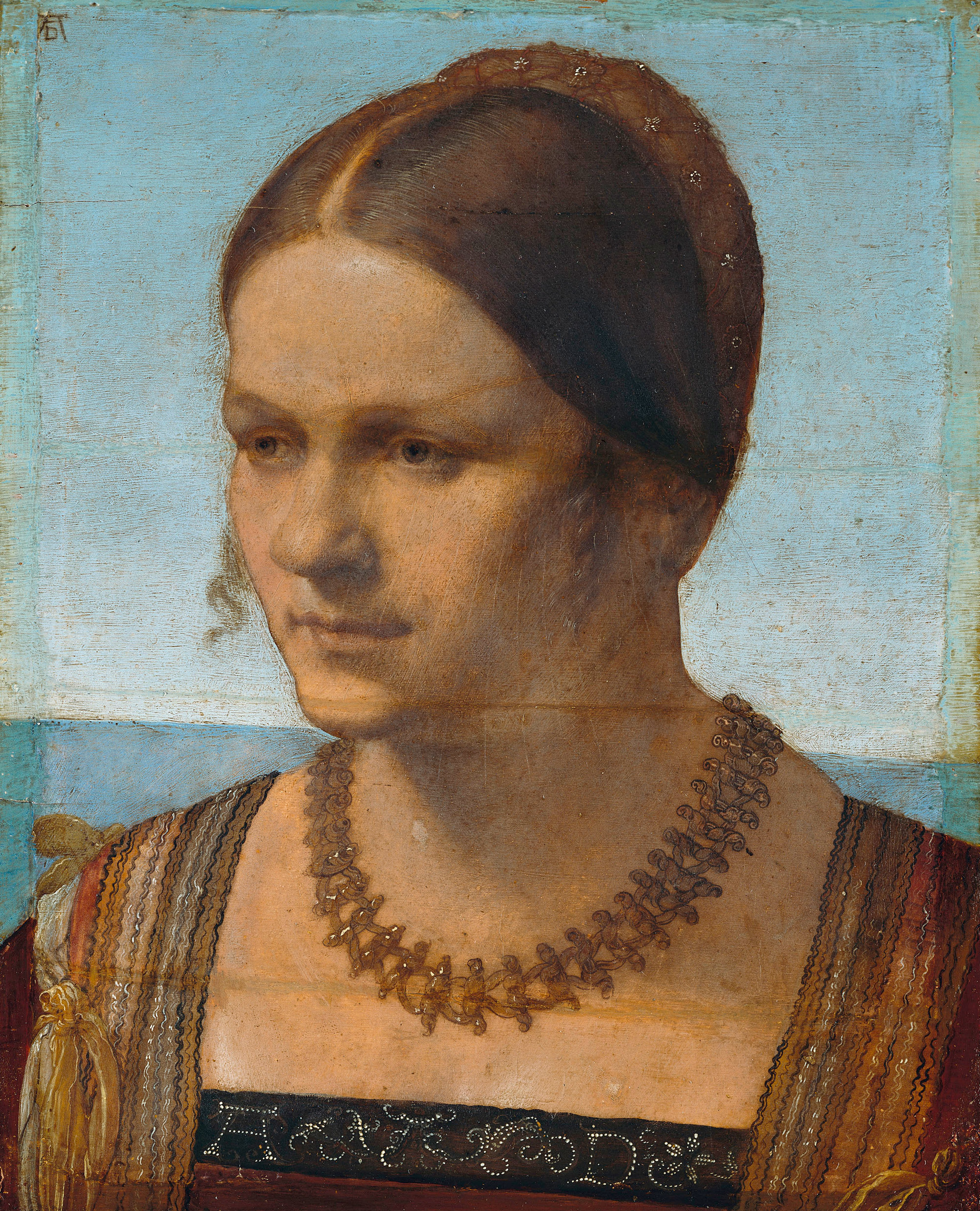
A German Woman from Venice, Albrecht Dürer, . 1507. Dahlem Museums, Berlin

The woman wears a patterned gown with tied-on sleeves that show the chemise beneath. Her hair frames her face in soft waves, and her back hair is confined in a small draped cap. The work's harmony and grace are achieved through its mixtures of tones, from her pale, elegant skin and reddish blond hair to her black-and-pearl necklace and highly fashionable patterned dress, all of which are highlighted against a flat black background.

The portrait is similar in pose and colour tone to his c. 1507 A German Woman from Venice. Two other two studies of Venetian women are known, both of which are very daring: one shows the model with a plunging neckline, the other with bare shoulders.

== Attribution ==
Dürer became fascinated by Giovanni Bellini during his visit to Italy, and they eventually became friends. Bellini was already an established master when Dürer was still relatively unknown outside of Germany. The Franconian artist's influence can be seen in this work's soft modelling, dramatic lighting and vivid colours and tones.

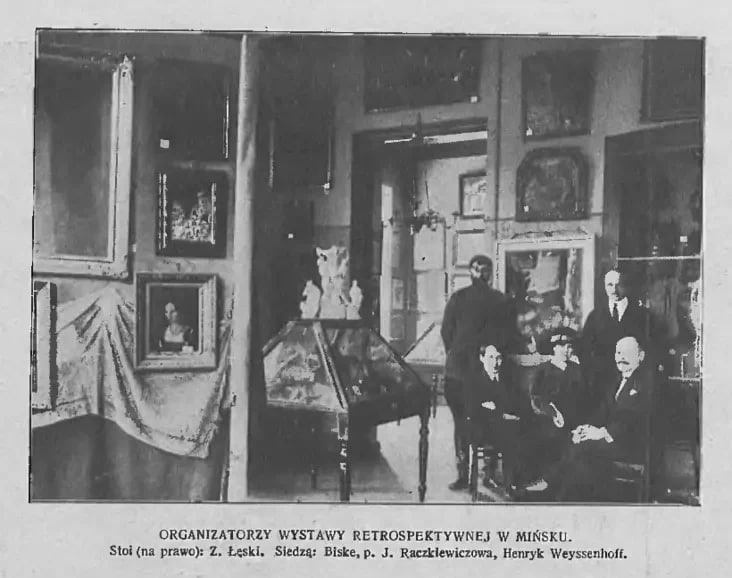
The organizers of the 1918 retrospective exhibition in Minsk. Dürer's Portrait of a Young Venetian Woman is visible on the wall (bottom left). The group includes the artists Zenon Łęski (standing right) and Henryk Weyssenhoff (seated right).

The portrait was acquired by the Kunsthistorisches Museum in 1923. While museum records originally described the source as a private "Lithuanian" collection, recent research has identified the seller as Witold Klemens Wańkowicz, a Polish diplomat of Belarusian descent whose family owned estates in the Minsk region (present-day Belarus). Prior to its sale to Vienna, the painting was held in the Wańkowicz family collection (likely in Minsk, Sliapianka or Smilavichy). It had been publicly exhibited in Minsk in 1918 during an exhibition organized by the Society for the Protection of Monuments ("Minsk Circle"), where it was already attributed to Dürer. A photograph of the painting appeared in the magazine Tygodnik Ilustrowany (nos. 21–22) that same year.

The identity of the sitter is lost; however, in dress and hairstyle, she appears to be Venetian rather than Germanic. The portrait is unfinished; a number of elements, noticeably the black bow above her chest, are not as well described as in other passages.

== Sources ==
- Morrall, Andrew. "Dürer and Venice", 2010.
- Silver, Larry; Smith, Jeffrey Chipps (2010). The Essential Dürer. University of Pennsylvania Press. p. 312. ISBN 978-0-8122-4187-7. JSTOR j.ctt3fhcdt. OCLC 794925814.
