= Heinz Kisters =

German art dealer and collector (1912–1977)

Heinz Kisters (1912-1977, in Kreuzlingen) was a German entrepreneur, art dealer and art collector.

== Life ==
Trained as a high-frequency engineer, Kisters was successful as an art dealer, selling notably to Konrad Adenauer. He assembled an extensive art collection of old masters, as well as uncertain attributions.

The "Heinz Kisters Foundation" continues in Kreuzlingen.

The collection includes works by Sandro Botticelli, Lucas Cranach the Elder, Gerard David, Anthony van Dyck, Jean Honoré Fragonard, Bartolomé Esteban Murillo, Peter Paul Rubens, Hans Schäufelein, Jan van Scorel, Bernardo Strozzi, Jacopo Tintoretto, Titian, Diego Velázquez, Maarten van Heemskerck and other masters. It is thus an important private collection of Old German, Old Dutch as well as early Italian painting, Venetian Cinquecento and Spanish painting of the 17th century.

The auction of a Titian painting in 2011 caused a sensation on the art market.

== Criticism ==
Heinz Kisters was the lifelong art dealer and advisor to German Chancellor Konrad Adenauer. Adenauer met Kisters in 1950 through the Cologne banker Robert Pferdmenges. Heinz Kisters supplied Adenauer with artworks he attributed to Aert van der Neer, Anthony van Dyck, Palma Vecchio, Nicolaes Maes and Barthel Bruyn the Elder. However, the artists were thought to be students or workshops of the real artists. Some attributions were based on appraisals paid after Kisters' purchase. The fact that other experts came to substantially different judgments was mentioned in most of the footnotes.

When Adenauer died in April 1967, his sons commissioned the then director of the Bavarian State Painting Collections to review the collection and give an expert opinion. According to the journalist Koldehoff, this appraisal amounted to 469,000 D-marks, which was far below what was expected for a collection of works by El Greco and Cranach. The appraisal, which was supported by material analyses from the Doerner Institute, forced Kisters to buy back 19 paintings for 950,000 D-marks. These works, together with other works from Kisters' possession, were put up for auction at Christie's in London. The 36 paintings for sale were expected to fetch 6 million D-marks, but only 5 of them were sold for a sum of 156,000 D-marks. Individual works, however, were later auctioned off at higher prices.

In an interview, Konrad Adenauer's grandson, whose own name is Konrad Adenauer, said of Kisters:

"My father never trusted Kisters. He was regarded by the Adenauers as a gray but obscure eminence. Kisters was like a secret name in the family: "Kisters was back," they would say. No one really knew what was behind it, but everyone knew that it had great significance for my grandfather. He was a kind of myth. Kisters haunted the conversations, but what the two of them were up to, no one knew. Skepticism was always present on the part of the children. After the death, that skepticism was confirmed."

== Literature ==
- Peter Strieder (Bearb.), Sammlung Heinz Kisters. Altdeutsche und Altniederländische Gemälde, Katalog der Ausstellung Nürnberg / Münster, Nürnberg 1963
- Sammlung Heinz Kisters, In: Kunstchronik Heft 8, 1963 (Katalognachtrag)
- Oscar Sandner (Bearb.), Meisterwerke der Malerei aus Privatsammlungen im Bodenseegebiet. Katalog der Ausstellung in Bregenz 1965
- Thomas Onken (Bearb.), Meisterwerke aus der Sammlung Heinz Kisters, Katalog der Ausstellung in Kreuzlingen 1971
- Dieter Koepplin und T. Falk (Bearb.), Lucas Cranach. Gemälde, Zeichnungen und Druckgraphik, Katalog der Ausstellung in Basel 1974
- Highly important pictures from the collection formed by the late Chancellor Konrad Adenauer, the property of Heinz Kisters, Esq. and others. Christie, Manson & Woods, London 26. Juni 1970.
- Sotheby's Auktionskatalog, 19th Century European Paintings, Frühjahr 2011
