= Nuremberg Chronicle =

1493 biblical encyclopedia by German historian Hartmann Schedel

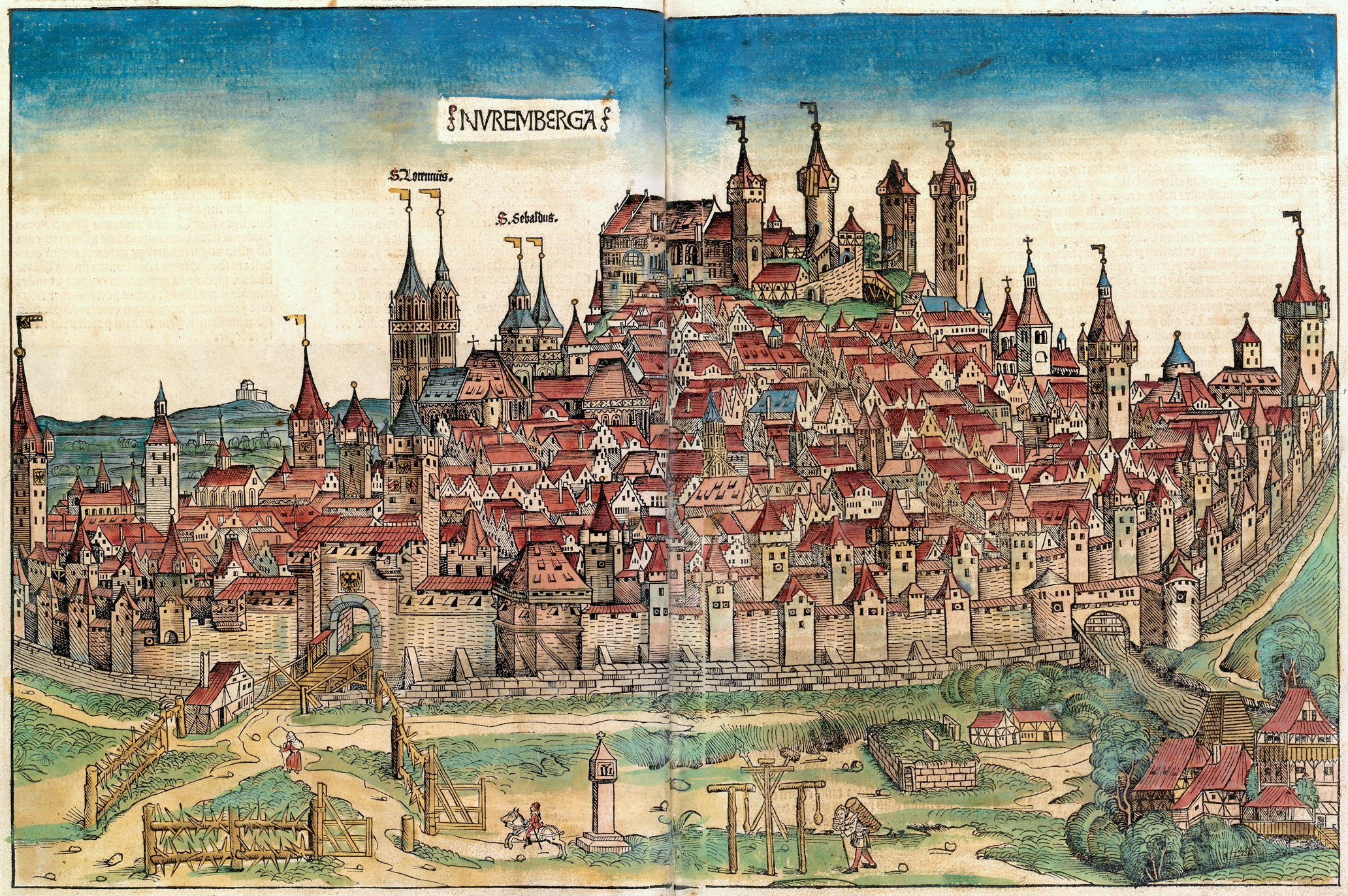
- Woodcut of Nuremberg, Nuremberg Chronicle
- Author: Hartmann Schedel
- Original title: Liber Chronicarum
- Illustrator: Michael Wolgemut and Wilhelm Pleydenwurff
- Language: Latin; German
- Subject: History of the world
- Genre: Universal history
- Published: 1493
- Publisher: Anton Koberger
- Pages: 336

The Nuremberg Chronicle is an illustrated encyclopedia consisting of world historical accounts, as well as accounts told through biblical paraphrase. Subjects include human history in relation to the Bible, illustrated mythological creatures, and the histories of important Christian and secular cities from antiquity. Finished in 1493, it was originally written in Latin by Hartmann Schedel, and a German version was translated by Georg Alt. It is one of the best-documented early printed books—an incunabulum—and one of the first to successfully integrate illustrations and text.

Latin scholars refer to it as the Liber Chronicarum ('Book of Chronicles') as this phrase appears in the index introduction of the Latin edition. English-speakers have long referred to it as the Nuremberg Chronicle after the city in which it was published. German-speakers refer to it as Schedelsche Weltchronik ('Schedel's chronicle of the world') in honour of its author.

== Production ==
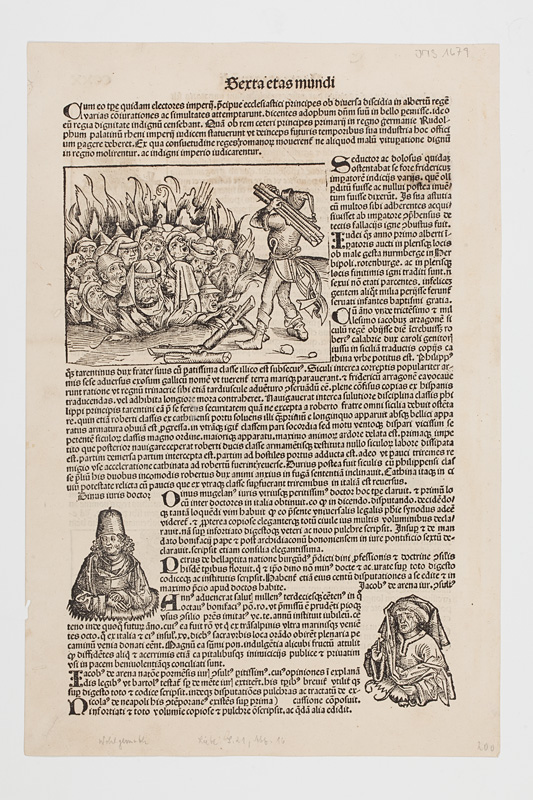
Woodcut from 1493 depicting the burning of Jews in the 14th century, today in the Jewish Museum of Switzerland in Basel

Two Nuremberg merchants, Sebald Schreyer (1446–1503) and his son-in-law, Sebastian Kammermeister (1446–1520), commissioned the Latin version of the chronicle on 29 December 1491. They also commissioned Georg Alt (1450–1510), a scribe at the Nuremberg treasury, to translate the work into German. Both Latin and German editions were printed by Anton Koberger in Nuremberg. Contracts were recorded by scribes, bound into volumes, and deposited in the Nuremberg City Archives. The first contract, from December 1491, established the relationship between the illustrators and the patrons. The painters, Wolgemut and Pleydenwurff, were to provide the layout of the chronicle, to oversee the production of the woodcuts, and to guard the designs against piracy. The patrons agreed to advance 1,000 gulden for paper, printing costs, and the distribution and sale of the book. A second contract between the patrons and the printer was executed in March 1492. It stipulated conditions for acquiring the paper and managing the printing. The blocks and the archetype were to be returned to the patrons once the printing was completed.

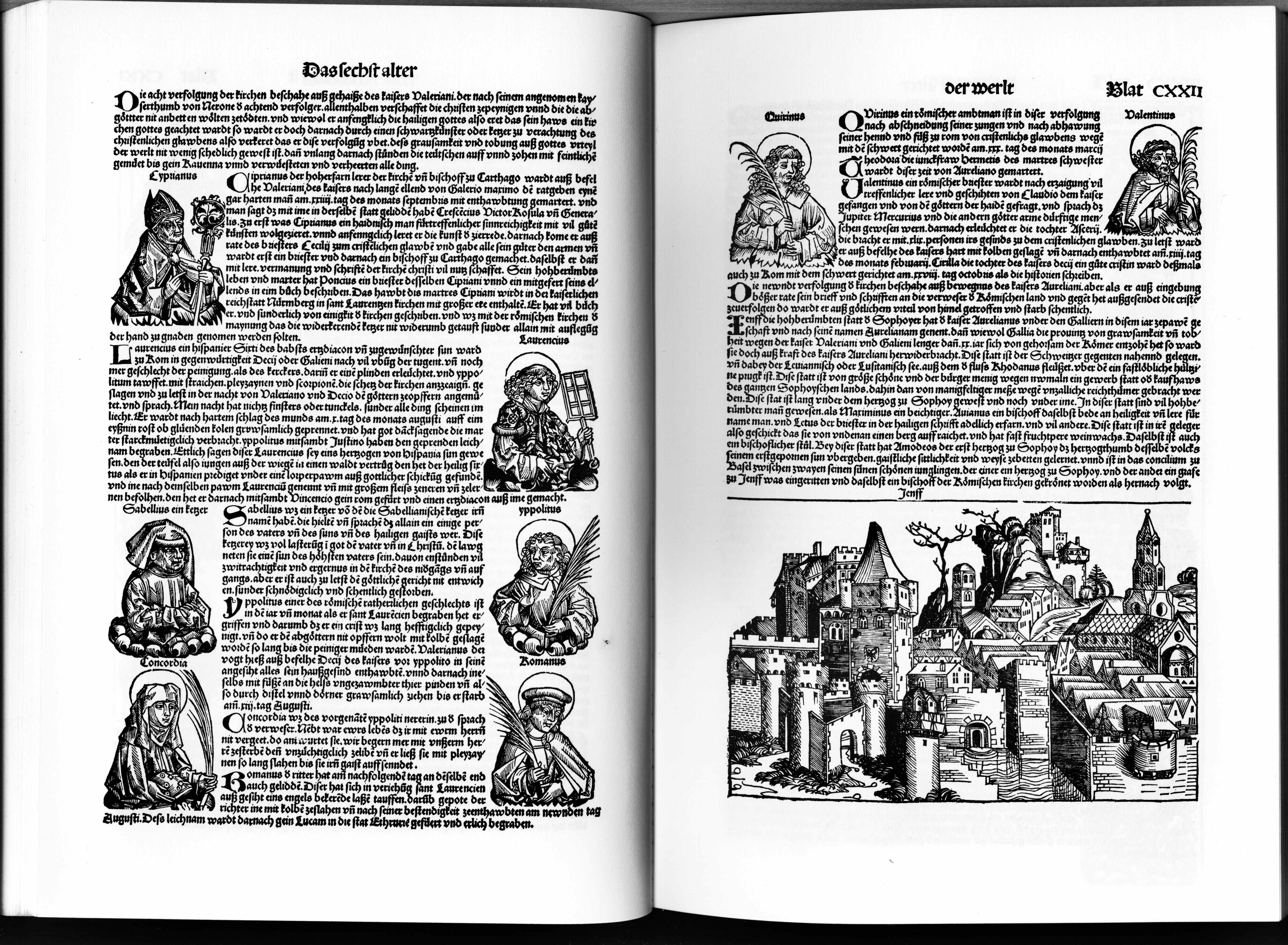
A typical opening, uncoloured

The author of the text, Hartmann Schedel, was a medical doctor, humanist, and book collector. He earned a doctorate in medicine in Padua in 1466, then settled in Nuremberg to practice medicine and collect books. According to an inventory done in 1498, Schedel's personal library contained 370 manuscripts and 670 printed books. The author used passages from the classical and medieval works in this collection to compose the text of the chronicle. He borrowed most frequently from another humanist chronicle, the Supplementum Chronicarum by Giacomo Filippo Foresti of Bergamo. It has been estimated that about 90% of the text is pieced together from works on humanities, science, philosophy, and theology, while about 10% of the chronicle is Schedel's original composition.

Nuremberg was one of the largest cities in the Holy Roman Empire in the 1490s, with a population of between 45,000 and 50,000. Thirty-five patrician families composed the City Council. The Council controlled all aspects of printing and craft activities, including the size of each profession and the quality, quantity, and type of goods produced. Although dominated by a conservative aristocracy, Nuremberg was a centre of northern humanism. Anton Koberger, printer of the Nuremberg Chronicle, printed the first humanist book in Nuremberg in 1472. Sebald Shreyer, one of the patrons of the chronicle, commissioned paintings from classical mythology for the grand salon of his house. Hartmann Schedel, author of the chronicle, was an avid collector of both Italian Renaissance and German humanist works. Hieronymus Münzer, who assisted Schedel in writing the chronicle's chapter on geography, was among this group, as were Albrecht Dürer and Johann and Willibald Pirckheimer.

== Publication ==
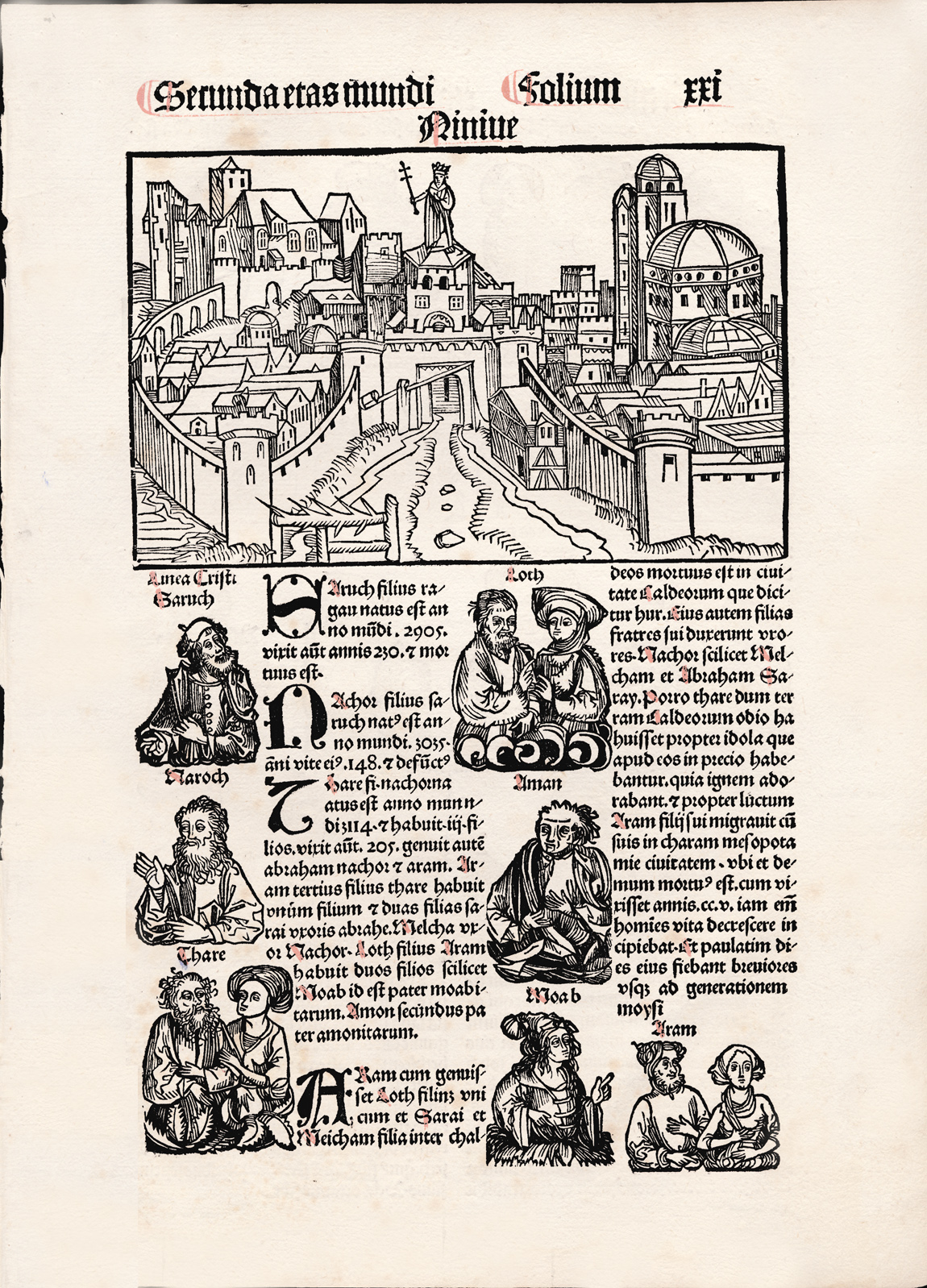
A page from a pirated edition of the Nuremberg Chronicle 1497

The Chronicle was first published in Latin on 12 July 1493, in the city of Nuremberg. This was quickly followed by a German translation on 23 December 1493. An estimated 1,400 to 1,500 Latin and 700 to 1,000 German copies were published. A document from 1509 records that 539 Latin versions and 60 German versions had not been sold. Unusually many copies survive: Paul Needham's census documents 1,287 copies of the Latin edition and 343 of the German, making the Chronicle one of the best-preserved major printed books of the fifteenth century. They are scattered around the world in museums and collections. The larger illustrations were also sold separately as prints, often hand-tinted in watercolour. Many copies of the book are coloured, with varying degrees of skill; there were specialist shops for this. The colouring on some examples has been added much later, and some copies have been broken up for sale as decorative prints.

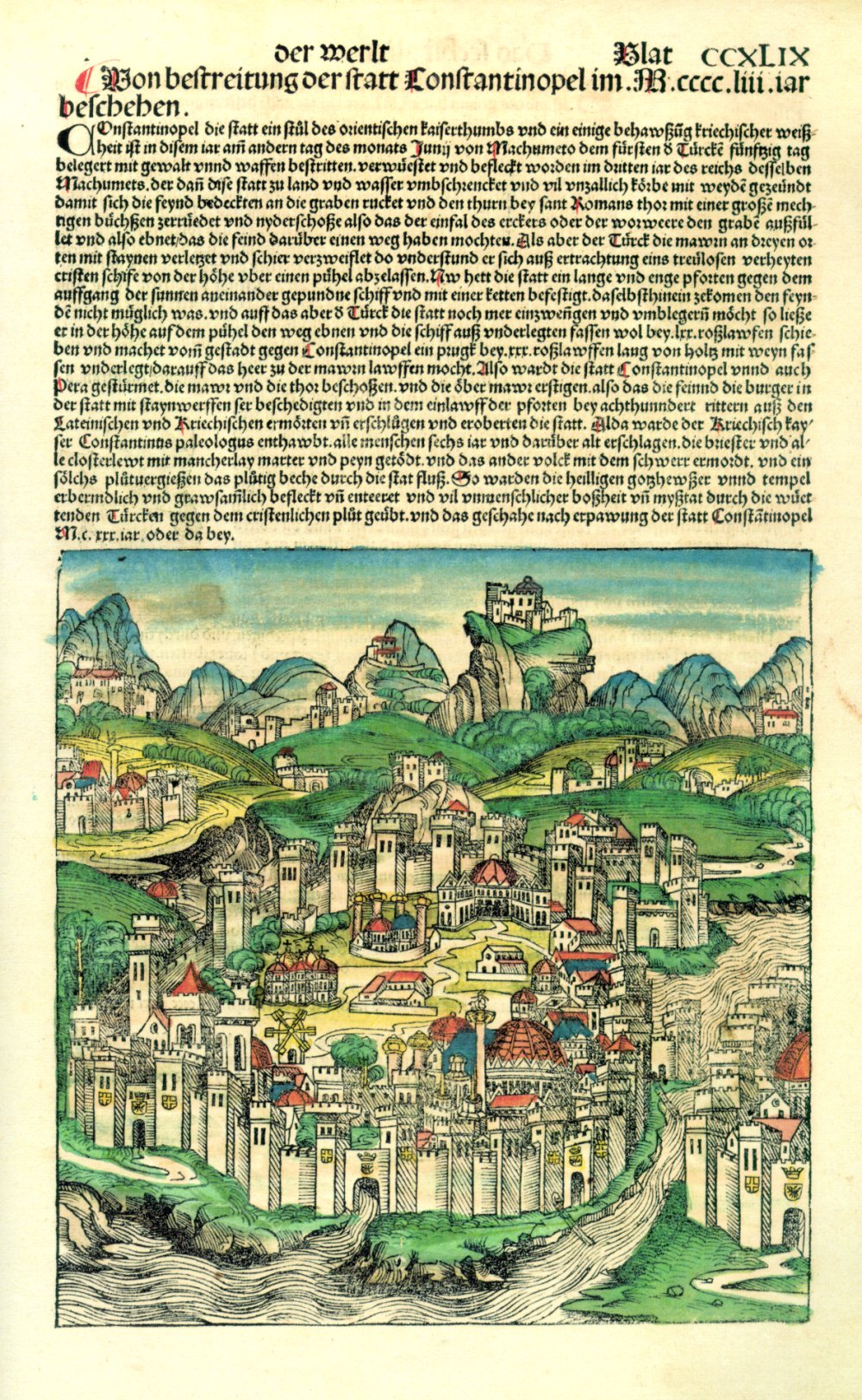
Page depicting Constantinople, with added hand-colouring

The publisher and printer was Anton Koberger, the godfather of Albrecht Dürer, who, in the year of Dürer's birth in 1471, ceased goldsmithing to become a printer and publisher. He quickly became the most successful publisher in Germany, eventually owning 24 printing presses and having many offices in Germany and abroad, from Lyon to Buda.

== Contents ==
The chronicle is an illustrated world history, in which the contents are divided into seven ages:

- First age: from creation to the Deluge
- Second age: up to the birth of Abraham
- Third age: up to King David
- Fourth age: up to the Babylonian captivity
- Fifth age: up to the birth of Jesus Christ
- Sixth age: up to the present time (the largest part)
- Seventh age: outlook on the end of the world and the Last Judgment

== Illustrations ==
The large workshop of Michael Wolgemut, Nuremberg's leading artist in various media, provided the unprecedented 1,809 woodcut illustrations (before duplications are eliminated; see below). Sebastian Kammermeister and Sebald Schreyer financed the printing in a contract dated March 16, 1492, although preparations had been well under way for several years. Wolgemut and his stepson Wilhelm Pleydenwurff were first commissioned to provide the illustrations in 1487–1488, and a further contract of December 29, 1491, commissioned manuscript layouts of the text and illustrations.

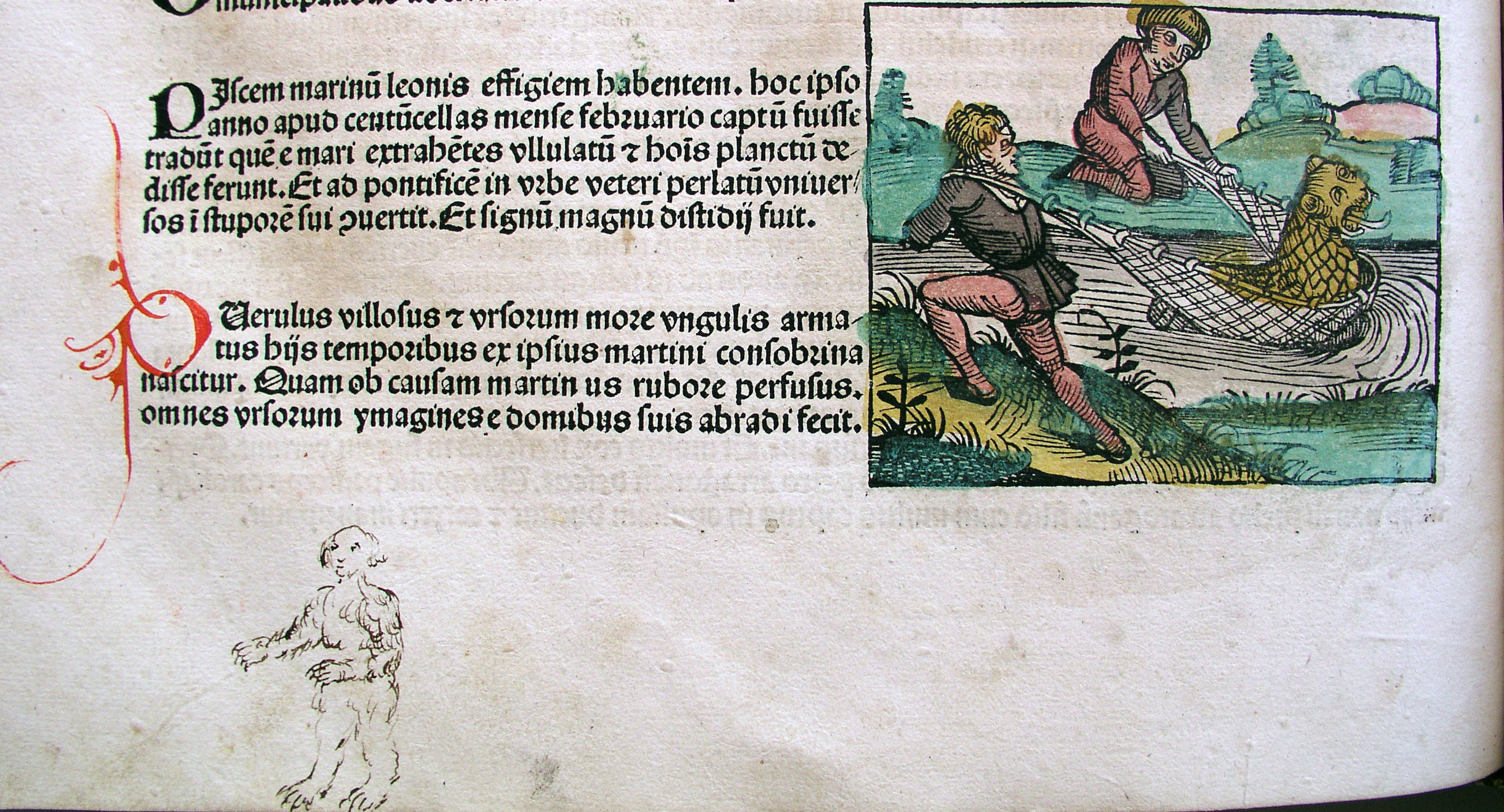
Catching a "lion fish" – a small illustration from a Latin copy. The red capital is done in pen and ink, and the doodle in the margin below.

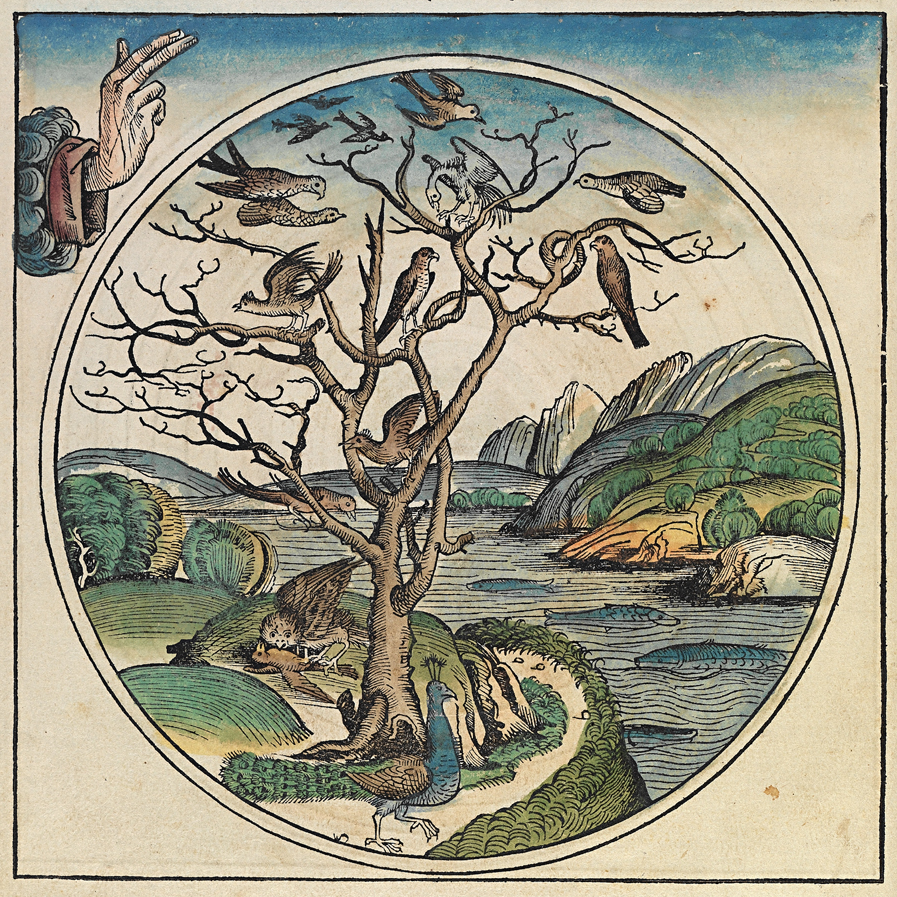
The fifth day of creation

Albrecht Dürer was an apprentice with Wolgemut from 1486 to 1489, so may well have participated in designing some of the illustrations for the specialist craftsmen (called "formschneiders") who cut the blocks, onto which the design had been drawn, or a drawing glued. From 1490 to 1494 Dürer was travelling. A drawing by Wolgemut for the elaborate frontispiece, dated 1490, is in the British Museum. While some art experts may claim to be able to identify which Nuremberg Chronicle woodcuts may be attributed to Dürer, there is no consensus. Dürer was not yet using his monogram, and no artists in Wolgemut's studio signed their work in the Chronicle.

Illustrations depicted many never-before-illustrated major cities in Europe and the Near East. Six hundred and forty-five original woodcuts were used for the illustrations. As with other books of the period, many of the woodcuts, showing towns, battles or kings were used more than once in the book, with just the text labels changed. The book is large at 18 by 12 in (460 by 300 mm). Only the city of Nuremberg is given a double-page illustration with no text measuring about 342 by 500 mm (13.5 by 19.7 in). The illustration for the city of Venice is adapted from a much larger woodcut of 1486 by Erhard Reuwich in the first illustrated printed travel book, the Sanctae Perigrinationes of 1486. This and other sources were used where possible; where no information was available a number of stock images were used and reused up to eleven times. The view of Florence was adapted from an engraving by Francesco Rosselli.

== Unauthorized editions ==
Due to the success and prestige of the Nuremberg Chronicle, which had one of the largest print-runs of an edition during the incunabula (also known as the incunable period of book production c. 1455–1500), one of the first large-scale pirated editions of the Chronicle appeared on the market. The culprit was Johann Schönsperger (c. 1455–1521), a printer working out of Augsburg who produced smaller editions of the Chronicle in 1496, 1497, and 1500 in German, Latin, and a second edition also in German. It was the beginning of unauthorized book editions, pirated editions which capitalized on the success of another author and printer/publisher without consent. Despite the pirating of a successful book, Schönsperger went bankrupt in 1507.

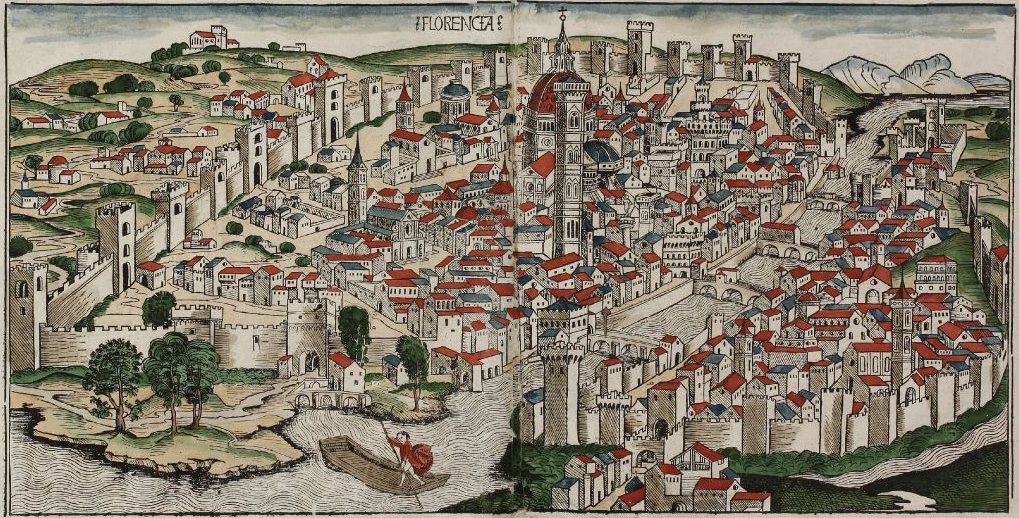
Coloured woodcut town view of Florence

== Bibliography ==
- Chronicle of the World: The Complete and Annotated Nuremberg Chronicle of 1493 (Taschen, 2001) ISBN 978-3-822-81295-2
- Biddick, Kathleen (2013). The Typological Imaginary: Circumcision, Technology, History. Philadelphia: University of Pennsylvania Press. p. 160. ISBN 9780812201277.
- Duniway, David Cushing. "A Study of the Nuremberg Chronicle." The Papers of the Bibliographical Society of America 35, no. 1 (1941): 17–34.
- Wagner, Bettina. Worlds of Learning: The Library and World Chronicle of the Nuremberg Physician Hartmann Schedel (1440-1514). Munich: Allitera Verlag, 2015.
