= 1526 in art =

Events from the year 1526 in art.

== Events ==
- c. September - German artist Hans Holbein the Younger begins a two-year stay in England.

== Works ==
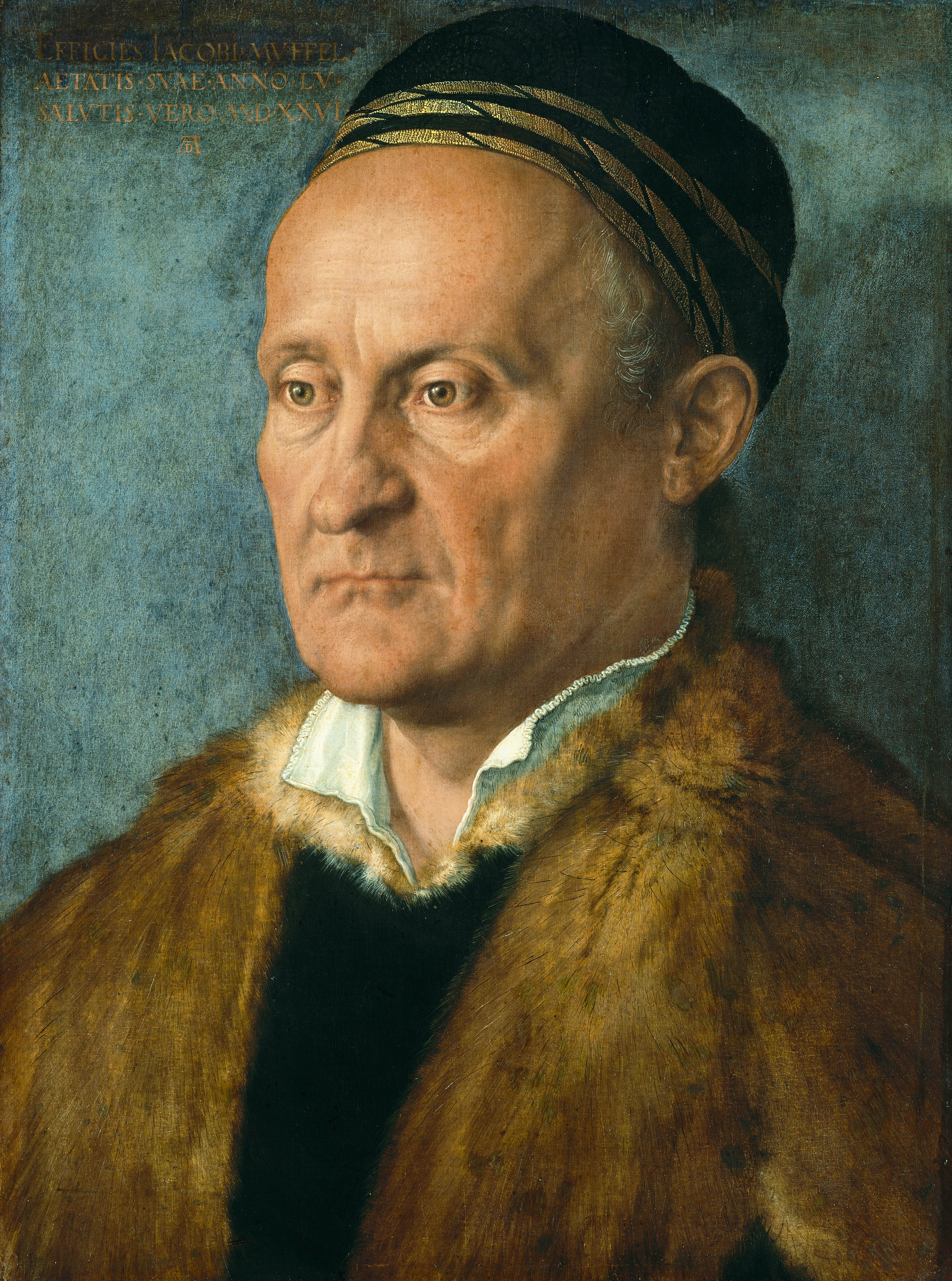
Dürer – Portrait of Jakob Muffel

- Lucas Cranach the Elder – Kattarina Luterin
- Albrecht Dürer
  - Erasmus of Rotterdam (engraving)
  - The Four Apostles
  - Portrait of Hieronymus Holzschuher
  - Portrait of Jakob Muffel
- Innocenzo di Pietro Francucci da Imola – The Virgin and Child with Saints John the Baptist, Peter and Paul, Joachim and Anne
- Lucas Horenbout – Portrait miniatures (approximate date)
  - Catherine of Aragon with a monkey
  - Catherine of Aragon
  - Henry VIII
- Hans Holbein the Younger
  - Darmstadt Madonna
  - Lais of Corinth
- Lorenzo Lotto
  - Christ Carrying the Cross
  - Portrait of a Young Man
- Sebastiano del Piombo – Portrait of Andrea Doria

== Births ==
- October 30 - Hubert Goltzius, Dutch painter, engraver and printer (died 1583)
- date unknown
  - Federico Barocci, Italian Renaissance painter and printmaker (died 1612)
  - Juan Fernández Navarrete, Spanish Mannerist painter (died 1579)
  - Giovanni Battista Zelotti, Italian painter (died 1578)
- probable
  - Jacob Grimmer, Flemish landscape painter (died 1590)
  - Nicolaus van Aelst, Flemish engraver and painter (died 1613)
  - (1526/1527) Melchior Lorck, painter, draughtsman, and printmaker of Danish-German origin (died 1583)

== Deaths ==
- date unknown
  - Andrea Ferrucci, Italian sculptor (born 1465)
  - Liberale da Verona, Italian painter active mainly in Verona (born 1441)
  - Giovanni di Niccolò Mansueti, Italian painter (b. unknown)
  - Jerg Ratgeb, German painter (born 1480; executed for treason)
  - Jacopo Torni, Florentine painter (born 1476)
  - Bernardo Zenale, Italian painter and architect (born 1460)
- probable
  - Nicolò Brancaleon, Venetian-born painter who worked in Ethiopia (born 1460)
  - (1526/1529) Hans Maler zu Schwaz, German painter and portraitist (born 1480)
