= Gemäldegalerie, Berlin =

Art museum in Berlin, Germany

Gemäldegalerie
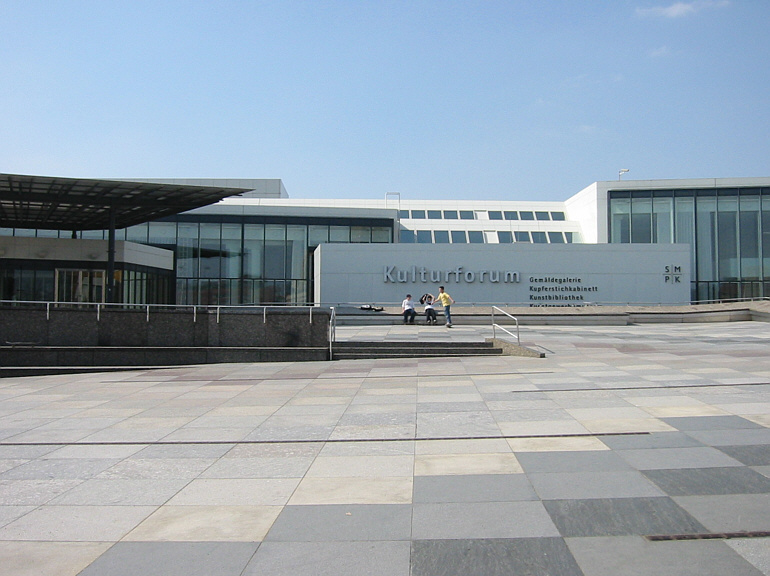
- Gemäldegalerie, Berlin
- Interactive fullscreen map
- Location: Berlin, Germany
- Coordinates: 52°30′31″N 13°21′53″E
- Website: www.smb.museum/en/museums-institutions/gemaeldegalerie/home/

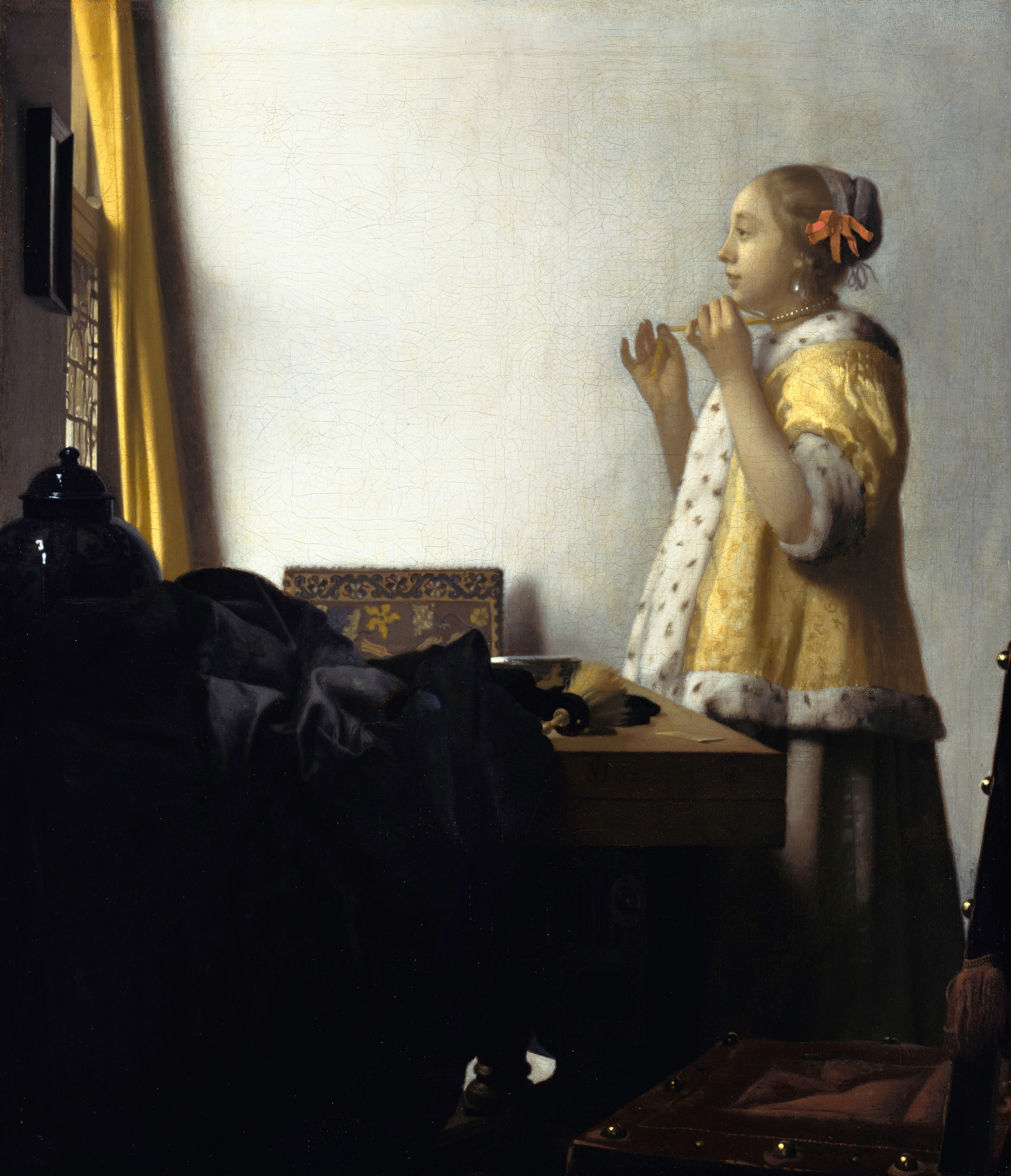
Johannes Vermeer, Woman with a Pearl Necklace

The Gemäldegalerie (German pronunciation: [ɡəˈmɛːldəɡaləˌʁiː], lit. 'Painting Gallery') is an art museum in Berlin, Germany, and the museum where the main selection of paintings belonging to the Berlin State Museums (Staatliche Museen zu Berlin) is displayed. It was first opened in 1830, and the current building was completed in 1998. It is located in the Kulturforum museum district west of Potsdamer Platz.

It holds one of the world's leading collections of European paintings from the 13th to the 18th centuries. Its collection includes masterpieces from such artists as Albrecht Dürer, Lucas Cranach, Hans Holbein, Rogier van der Weyden, Jan van Eyck, Raphael, Botticelli, Titian, Caravaggio, Peter Paul Rubens, David Teniers the Younger, Rembrandt, Frans Hals, Johannes Vermeer, Thomas Gainsborough, Joshua Reynolds and Antonio Viviani.

== Collection ==
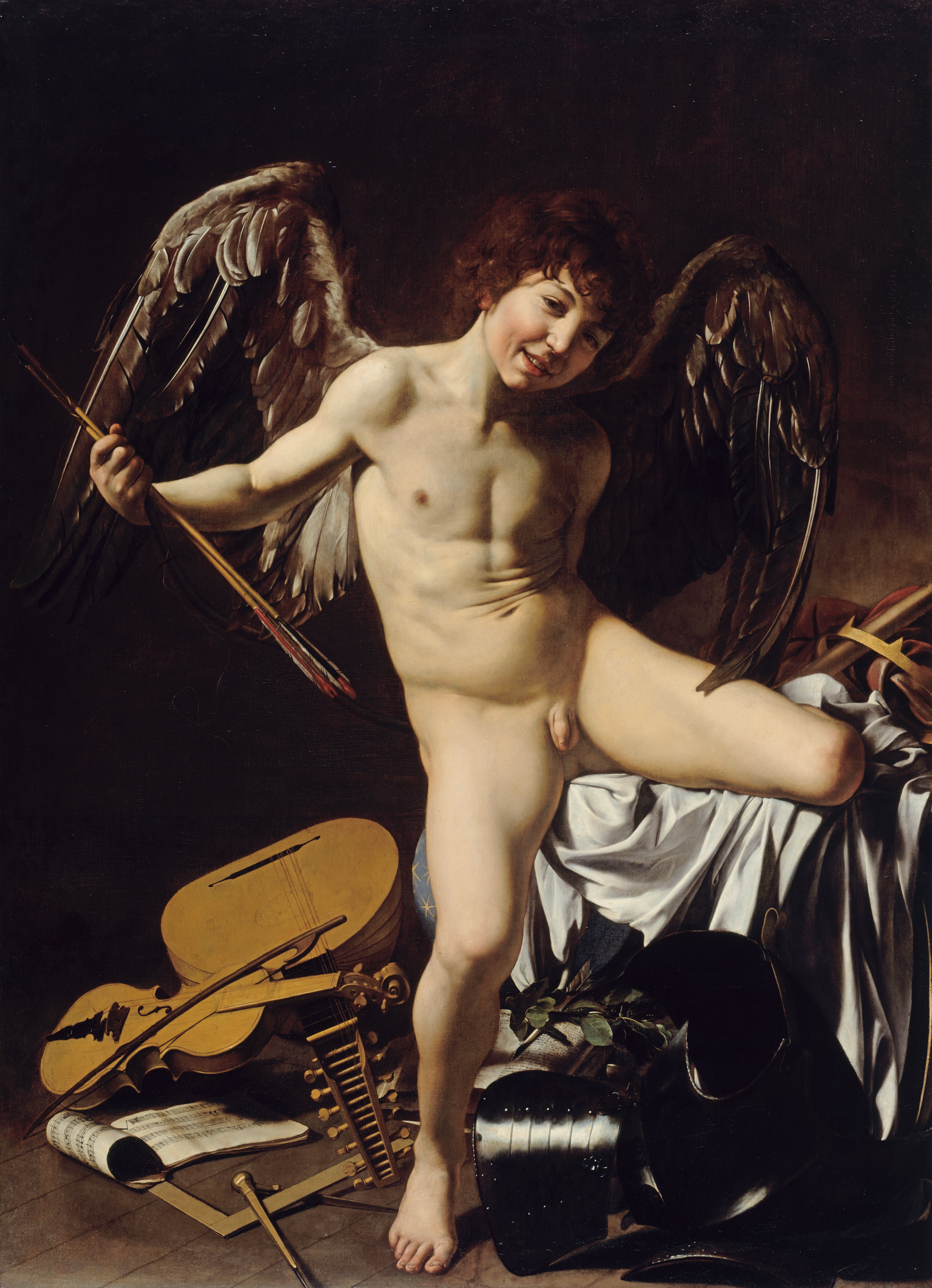
Amor Victorious (1602–1603). Oil on canvas. 156 x 113 cm. Caravaggio shows Eros prevailing over other human endeavors: war, music, science, government.

Unlike most major national European collections (with the exception of the National Gallery, London), the Gemäldegalerie collection is not essentially formed around the former dynastic royal collection, but created by a process of acquisition by the Prussian government beginning in 1815. From the first the museum was intended to reflect the full range of European art, giving a different emphasis from that of older royal collections, including the royal collection of Saxony, now mostly in the Gemäldegalerie Alte Meister in Dresden, the finest German princely collection, which like other royal collections is strongest in Italian art.

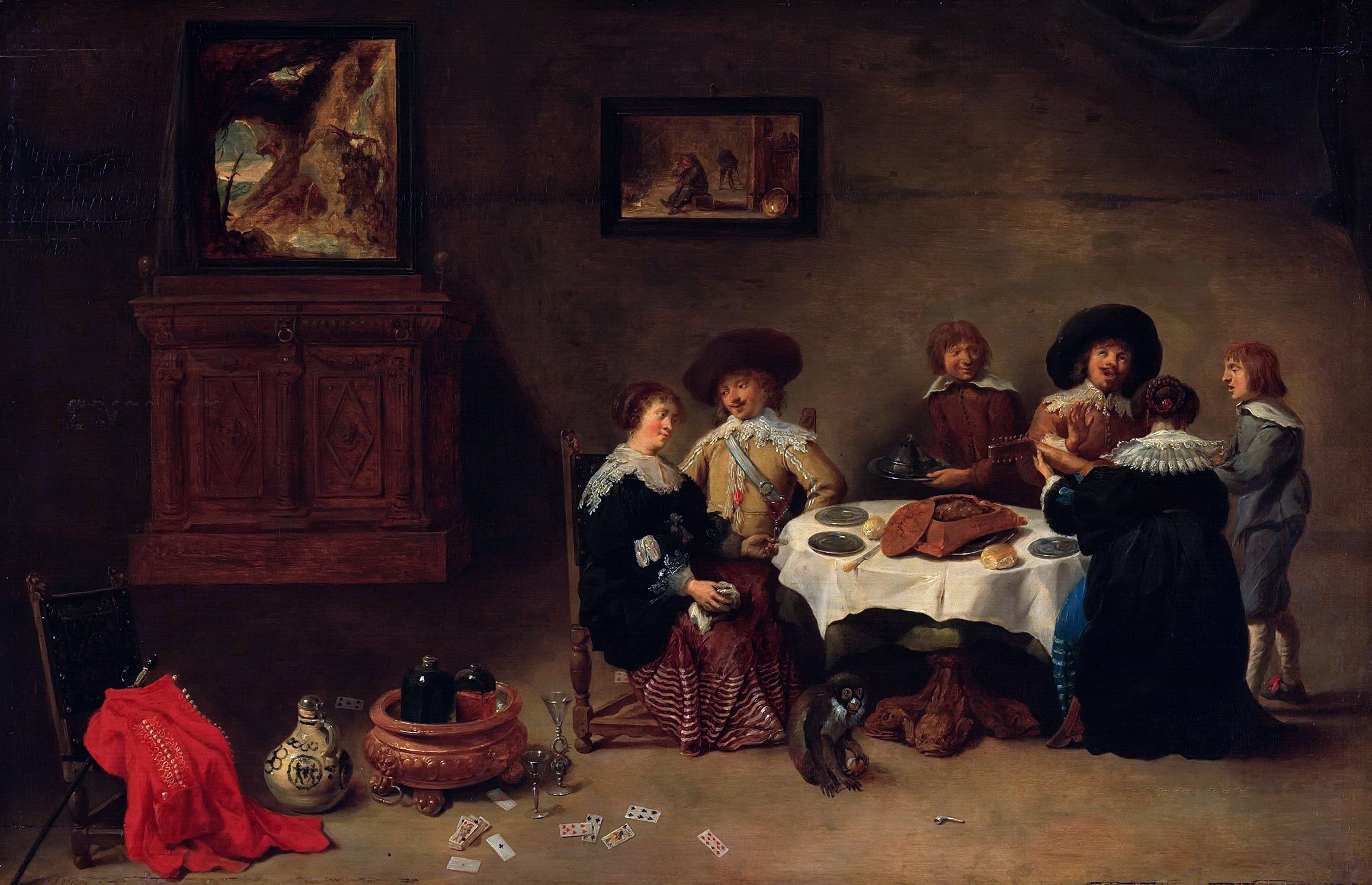
Company at a Meal by David Teniers the Younger

The collection is arranged more or less chronologically starting from the entrance and moving toward the farthest room; however there are many doors back to the long central space, so it is straightforward to reach any other room at any point. The visitor chooses between southern, mainly Italian, art to the left, and German and Flemish art to the right. Completing the circuit takes the visitor first forward, then backward, in time. The numbering system starting on the north side of the museum covers mostly Northern European art, then British art. A visitor following along the southern side will go through mostly Italian and Southern European art. The main floor galleries contain some 850 works in 53 rooms, with around 400 more in several rooms off a corridor downstairs, which are also open to visitors.

The Gemäldegalerie prides itself on its scientific methodology in collecting and displaying art. Each room can be taken in as a single statement about one to five artists in a certain period or following a certain style. The German collection is the finest and most comprehensive in the world, rivaled only by Vienna and Munich, and the Early Netherlandish and Italian collections are also exceptionally comprehensive. The holdings of Spanish, French, and British art are much smaller. Especially notable rooms include the octagonal Rembrandt room and a room containing five different Madonnas by Raphael.

There are two paintings by Vermeer in the collection, The Wine Glass and Woman with a Pearl Necklace.

Other notable experiences include Flemish moralistic paintings which stretch across the north side of the museum, showing an interplay between the religious motives of the artists' patrons and the often sensual inspirations of the artists. In the Renaissance section, for example, Caravaggio's Amor Victorious is displayed alongside Giovanni Baglione's Sacred Love Versus Profane Love. The two paintings are historically connected; after hearing of the scandalous portrayal of the theme "love conquers all" in Caravaggio's work, a Roman bishop commissioned Baglione's reply, which mimics Carvaggio's style, including the features of Amor.

== Building ==
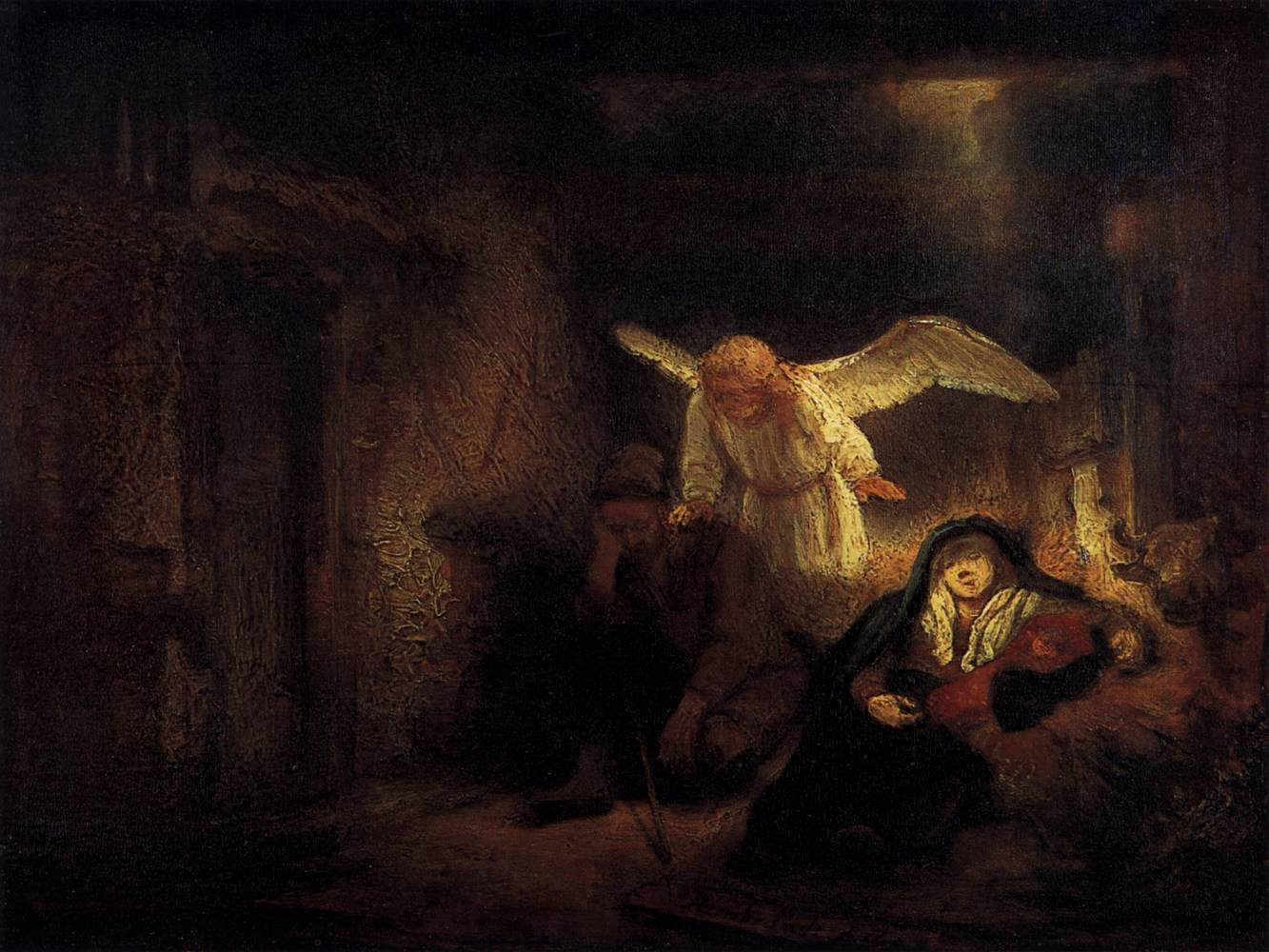
Joseph's Dream, Rembrandt, c. 1645

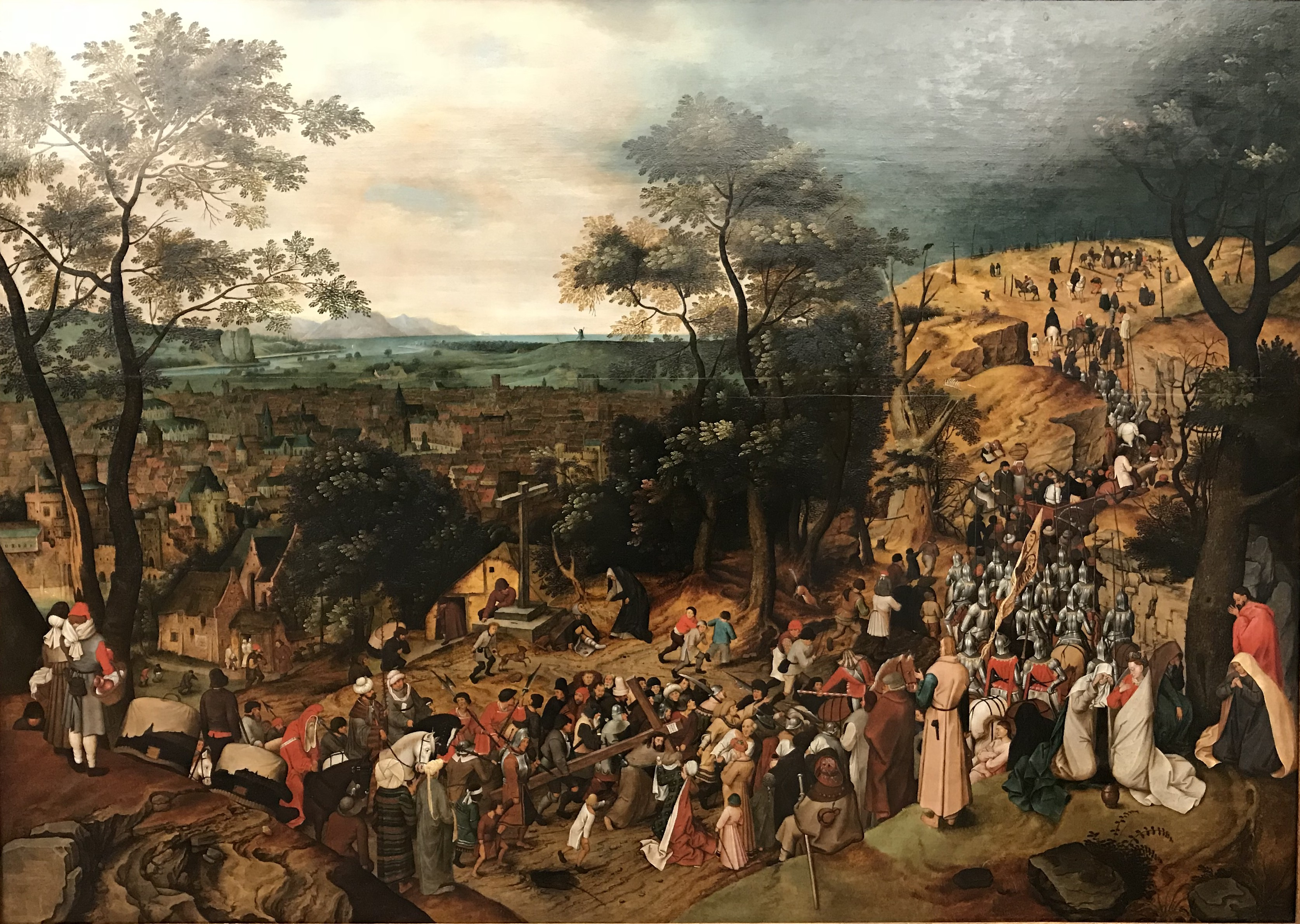
Christ carrying the cross, Pieter Brueghel the Younger

The current gallery sits in the southwest corner of the Kulturforum, a modern-styled answer to the old Museumsinsel (Museum Island). The gallery was designed by Munich architects Heinz Hilmer and Christoph Sattler. The building consists of 72 rooms providing a two-kilometer (1.25 mi) floor. Upstairs the rooms flow around a large central hall, described by the museum as a "meditation hall". The hall sometimes displays sculpture, but is mostly empty, allowing easy crossing between rooms, and somewhere for school parties to sit. There are also works downstairs, a gallery devoted to frames, and a digital gallery.

=== Aborted relocation ===
In 2012, the gallery's collection faced a pending move to a temporary site on Berlin's Museumsinsel, to make room for the expansion of the Neue Nationalgalerie and the 20th-century collection of Ulla and Heiner Pietzsch, bequeathed on condition that it be displayed in its entirety. The proposal has provoked controversy and criticism, particularly since there are no permanent plans for a new structure that would house the collection in its full scope.

The plan to move the collection was later scrapped following the public backlash and financial considerations regarding the new buildings. The paintings will remain in their current location.

== History ==
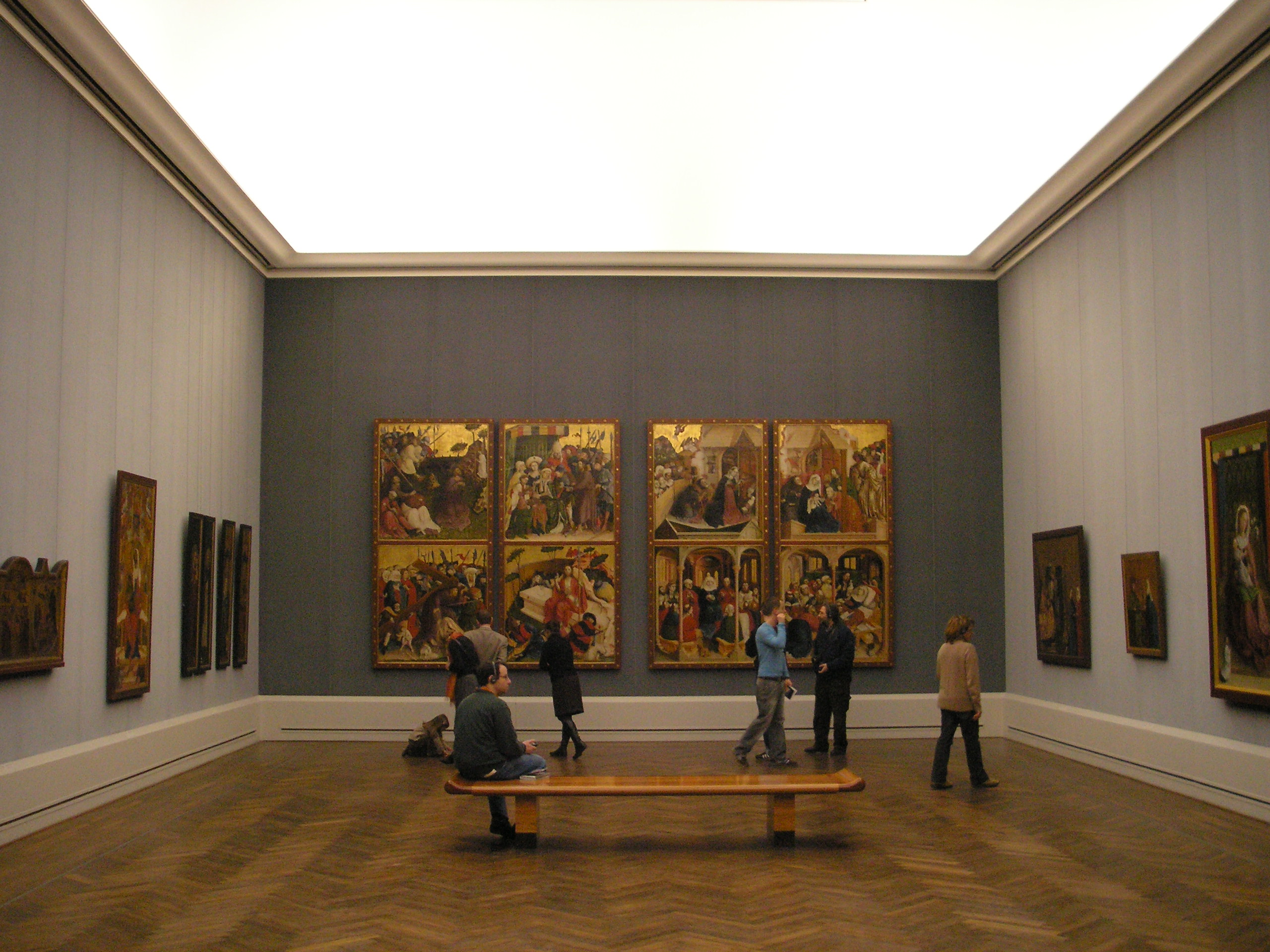
One of the rooms with German medieval religious paintings

The collection was first opened to the public in 1830, on completion of construction of the Royal Museum, now called the Altes Museum ("Old Museum"), designed by Karl Friedrich Schinkel and sited by the Lustgarten opposite the Royal Palace on the other side of Unter den Linden. The paintings occupied the upper floor with the collection of antiquities on the lower. At this point, the collection contained nearly 1200 paintings, with a core of 160 from the 17th-century collection of Marchese Vincenzo Giustiniani, bought in Paris in 1815. An even more important purchase was 677 paintings from the collection formed in Berlin by the English merchant Edward Solly, which were acquired in 1821; Solly was an early collector of Italian Trecento and Quattrocento paintings and Early Netherlandish painting.

Purchases continued throughout the 19th century, with 345 works acquired during the inaugural directorship of Gustav Friedrich Waagen from 1830 to 1868, though paintings competed with antiquities for rather reduced purchasing budgets.

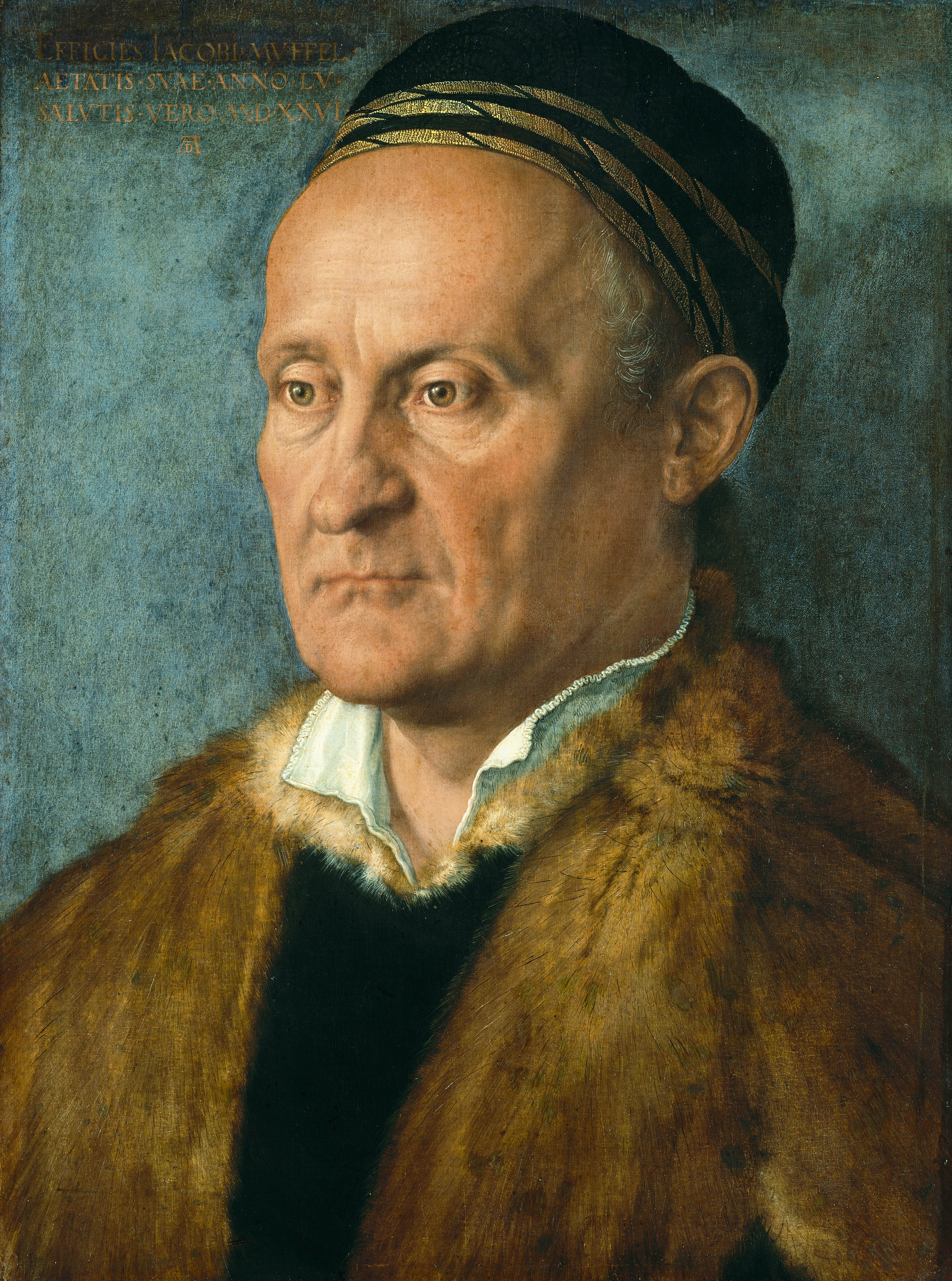
Albrecht Dürer, Portrait of Jakob Muffel 1526

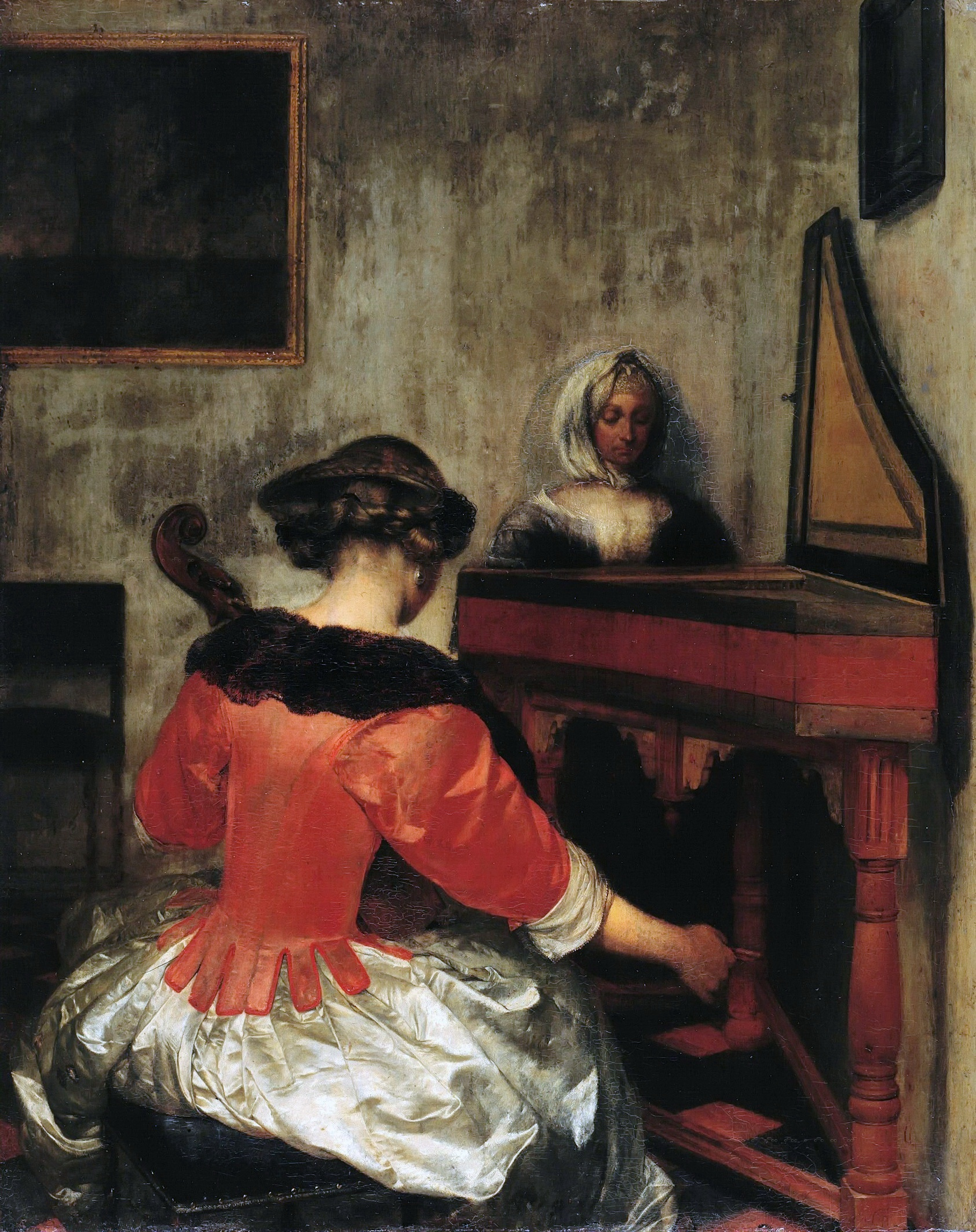
Gerard ter Borch, The Concert

After Berlin became the capital of the new German Empire in 1871 the funds available greatly increased, and purchases accelerated, as Berlin strove to catch up with the greatest European collections. In 1874 the collection acquired the best of the collection of mostly north European art formed by the industrialist Barthold Suermondt of Aachen after his business collapsed. This was handled for the museum by the art historian Wilhelm von Bode, who had joined in 1872, and was to be the Berlin Museums' greatest Director. He headed the sculpture collections from 1883, then the paintings from 1890, becoming general head of the Berlin Museums from 1890 to 1920. A specialist in Rembrandt and Dutch painting, he made very significant additions in those areas but did not neglect Italian painting. His leadership marked the rise of the Gemäldegalerie to international prominence.

In 1904 the Gemäldegalerie moved to the newly built Kaiser Friedrich Museum, now the Bode Museum, where the collection continued to expand. The museum was badly damaged during World War II, but most of the collection survived the war in shelters across Germany. At the end of the war, however, 400 works that were regarded as too large to take to the remoter hiding places were destroyed in a fire in a Flak tower that served as a bomb shelter. Many important altarpieces and other large works were lost, and the collection remains short of very large works compared to the other major European collections. Furthermore, several hundred paintings were looted by Russian or American soldiers or confiscated by the Red Army and never returned, although in June 2006 a small painting by Alessandro Allori, missing since 1944, was returned by the British journalist Charles Wheeler, who had been given it at the end of the war in Berlin. The surviving collection was divided between East Berlin (mostly at the Bode Museum on Museumsinsel) and West Berlin in Berlin-Dahlem, where from the 1950s they were housed in a building originally used for the Asiatic collections, built in 1923, with post-war additions.

Purchases for the West Berlin collection eventually resumed after the war, with Dutch Golden Age painting, Italian Baroque painting, and the creation of a small section for English painting being priorities for successive directors before the Re-unification of Germany. In 1992 the museum administrations of East and West were re-united, but uniting the collections physically took longer. The current building on the Kulturforum was completed in 1998, and displays some 1,250 paintings, although yet another move currently seems likely (see below). Other works are displayed elsewhere, as the museum forms part of the Berlin State Museums and does not own a distinct collection as most museums do. For example, L'Enseigne de Gersaint, or "Gersaint's Shopsign", (1720), a famous painting by Jean-Antoine Watteau, is displayed with other works in the appropriate setting of Charlottenburg Palace. The whole collection of Old Master Western paintings in the Berlin State Museums is usually said to be around 3,000.

In 1999 the Gemäldegalerie restituted to the heirs of the Jewish art collector Federico Gentili di Giuseppe a painting by Giovanni Battista Tiepolo, entitled Rinaldo Abandoning Armida. Gentili di Giuseppe's art collection had been plundered by Nazis and disposed of via a series of Paris sales in 1942; the Gemäldegalerie had acquired it from the French art dealer Cailleux, in 1979.

In 2019, Berlin's Gemäldegalerie (Old Master Gallery) returned two late medieval panels to the heirs of a famous Jewish art collector Harry Fuld Senior who had been looted by Nazis. In 1940 the panels by the Italian artist Giovanni di Paolo, The Clothing of St. Clare By St. Francis, and St. Clare Rescuing the Shipwrecked, (c 1455), were acquired via the art dealer Carl Bümming by what was then called the Kaiser-Friedrich-Museum.

In 2020 Berlin's Gemäldegalerie restituted a 16th-century painting by Hans Baldung Grien to the heirs of Hans Purrmann was forced to sell the work from his collection after losing his livelihood due to Nazi persecution.

== Directors ==
- Gustav Friedrich Waagen (1794–1868), 1823 until 1868
- Julius Meyer (1830–1893), 1872 until 1890
- Wilhelm von Bode (1845–1929), 1890 until 1920
- Max Jakob Friedländer (1867–1958), 1924 until 1933
- Karl Koetschau (1868–1949), 1933 until 1936
- Ernst Heinrich Zimmermann (1886–1971), 1936 until 1945

West Berlin:

  - Ernst Heinrich Zimmermann, since 1957
  - Cornelius Müller Hofstede (1898–1974), 1957 until 1964
  - Robert Oertel (1907–1981), 1964 until 1973
  - Henning Bock (* 1931), 1973 until 1990

East Berlin:

- Ludwig Justi (1876–1957), 1946 until 1957
- Hans Werner Grohn (1929–2009), 1957 until 1960
- Irene Geismeier, 1960 until 1990

After Reunion, 1990

  - Henning Bock, 1990 until 1996
  - Jan Kelch (1939–2017), 1996 until 2004
  - Bernd Wolfgang Lindemann (* 1951), 2004 until 2016
  - Michael Eissenhauer (* 1956), 2016 until 2021
  - Dagmar Hirschfelder (* 1973), since 2021

== Gallery ==
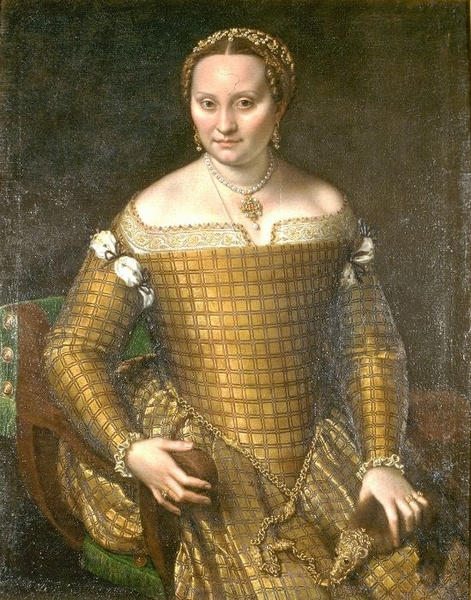
Sofonisba Anguissola, Portrait of Bianca Ponzoni Anguissola, 1557

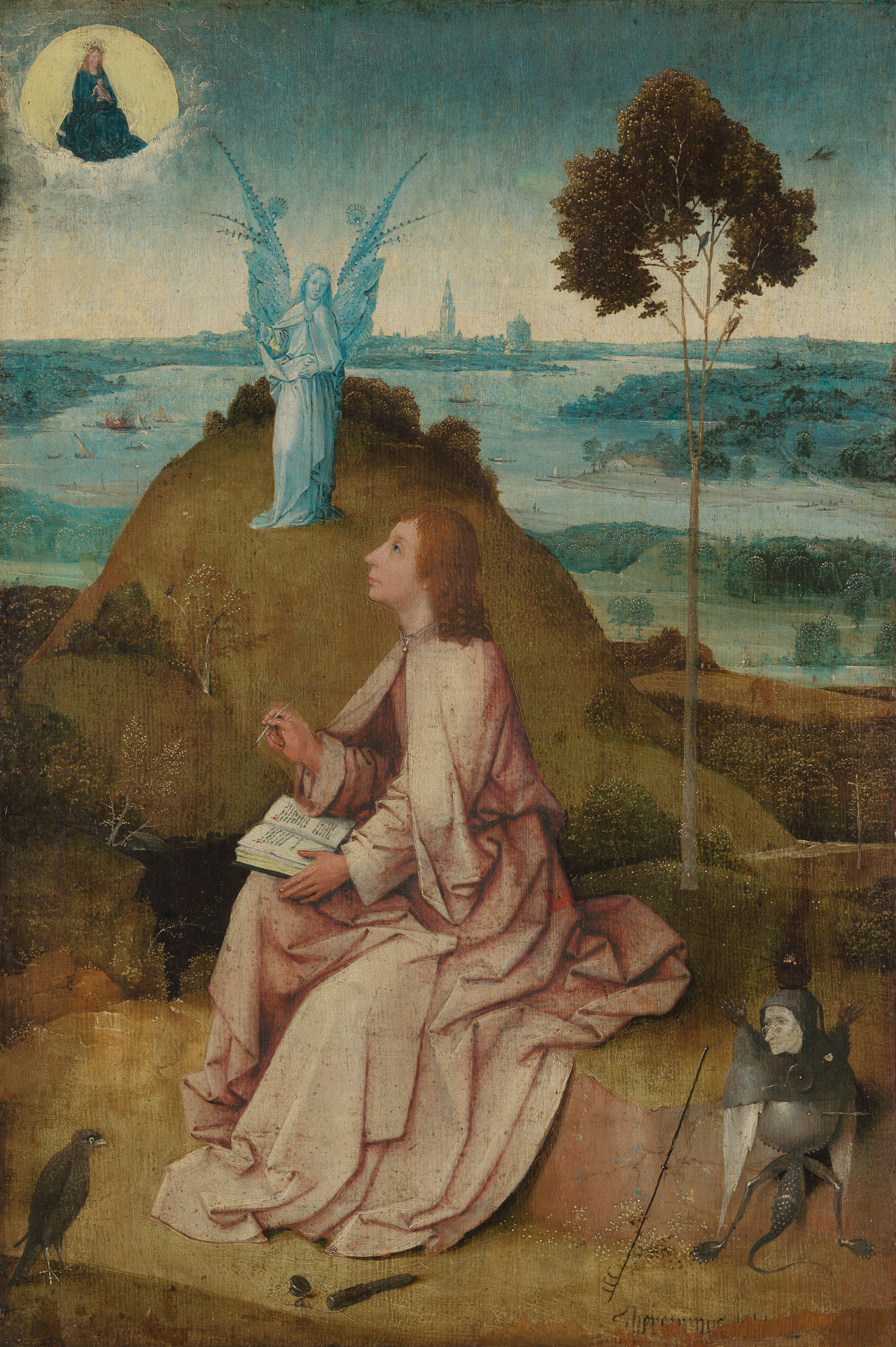
Hieronymus Bosch, St. John the Evangelist on Patmos c. 1489

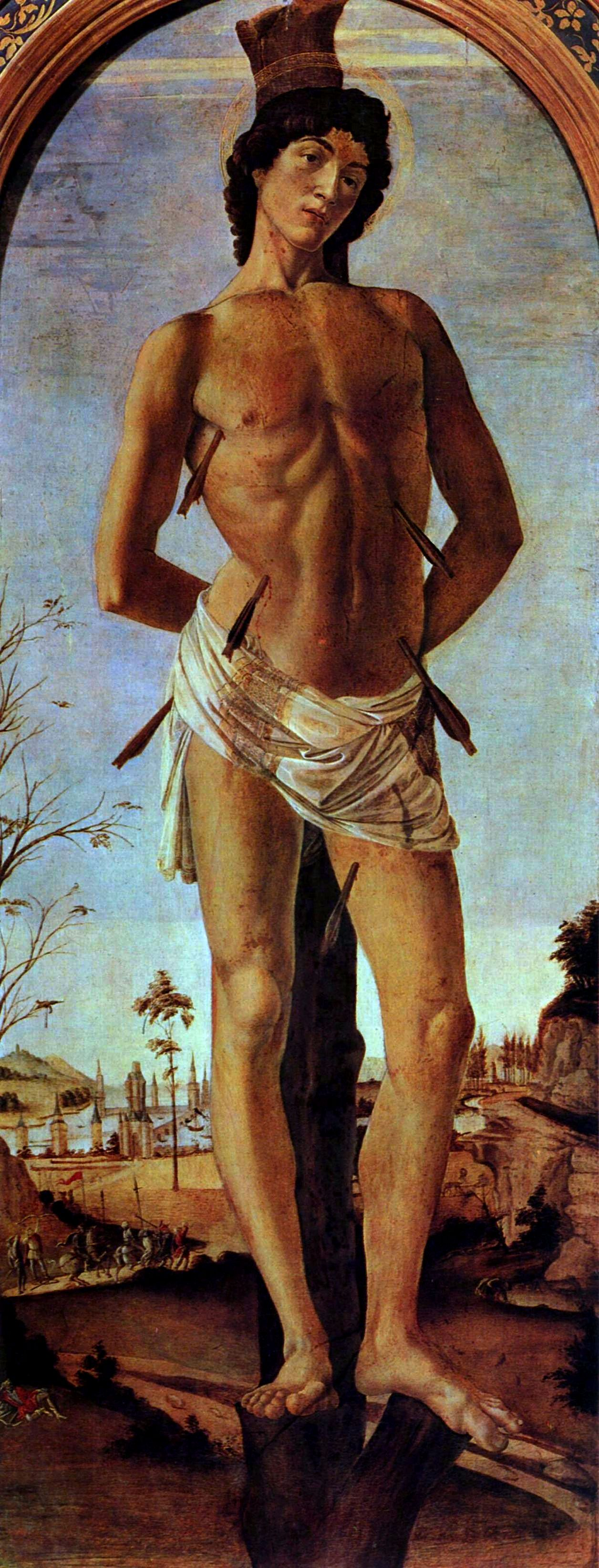
Sandro Botticelli, St Sebastian, 1475

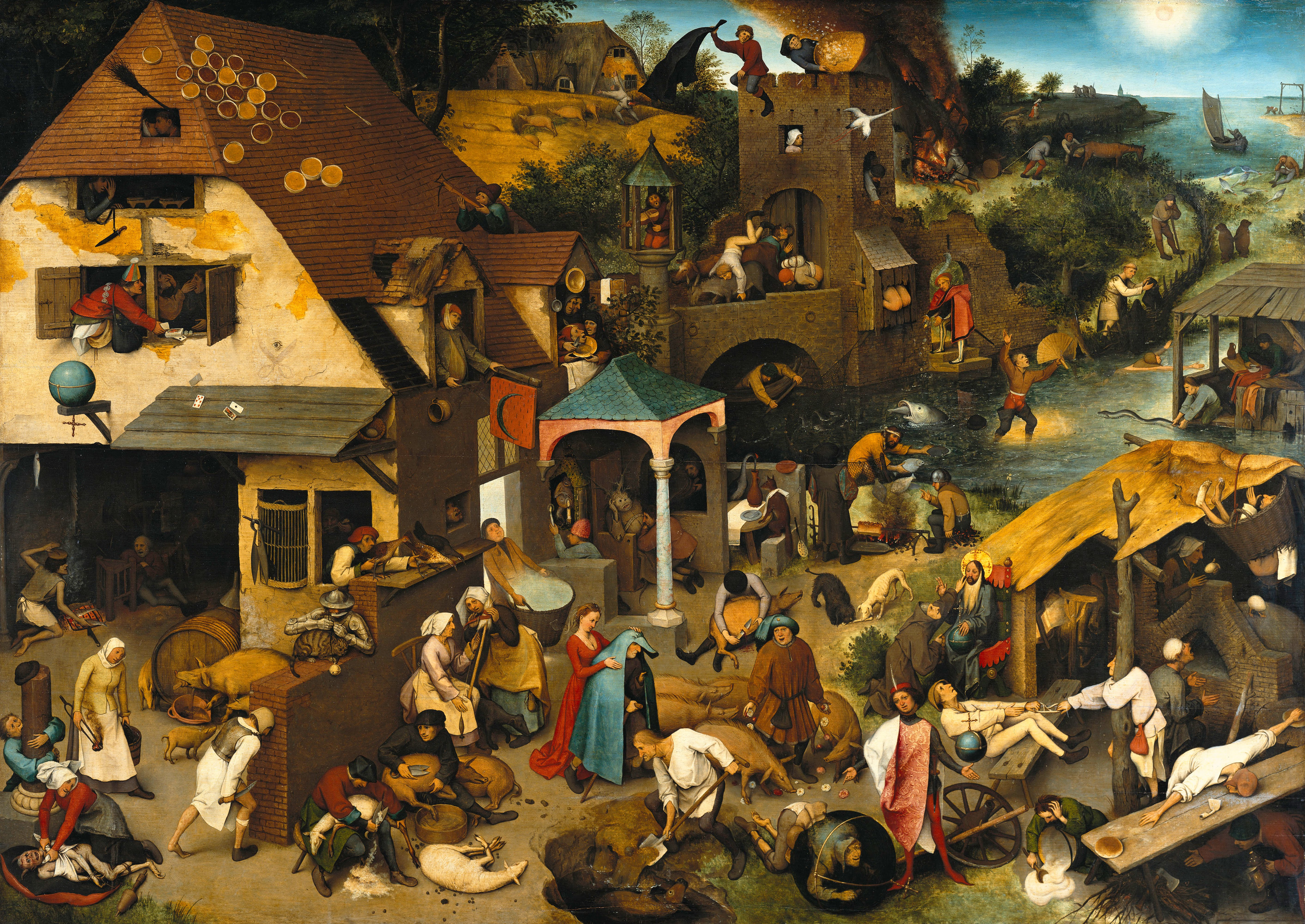
Pieter Brueghel the Elder. Netherlandish Proverbs, 1559

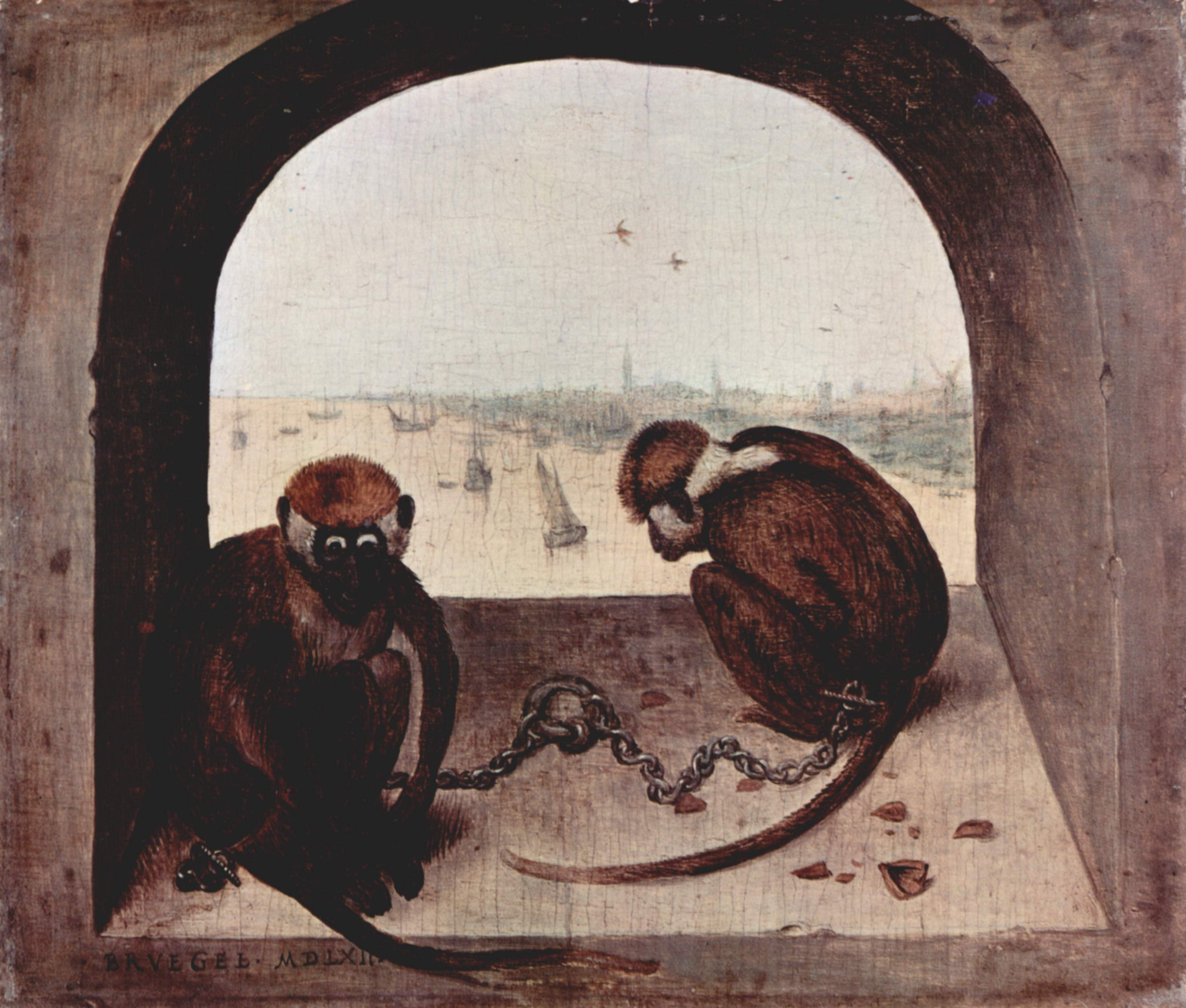
Pieter Brueghel the Elder, Two Monkeys, c. 1565

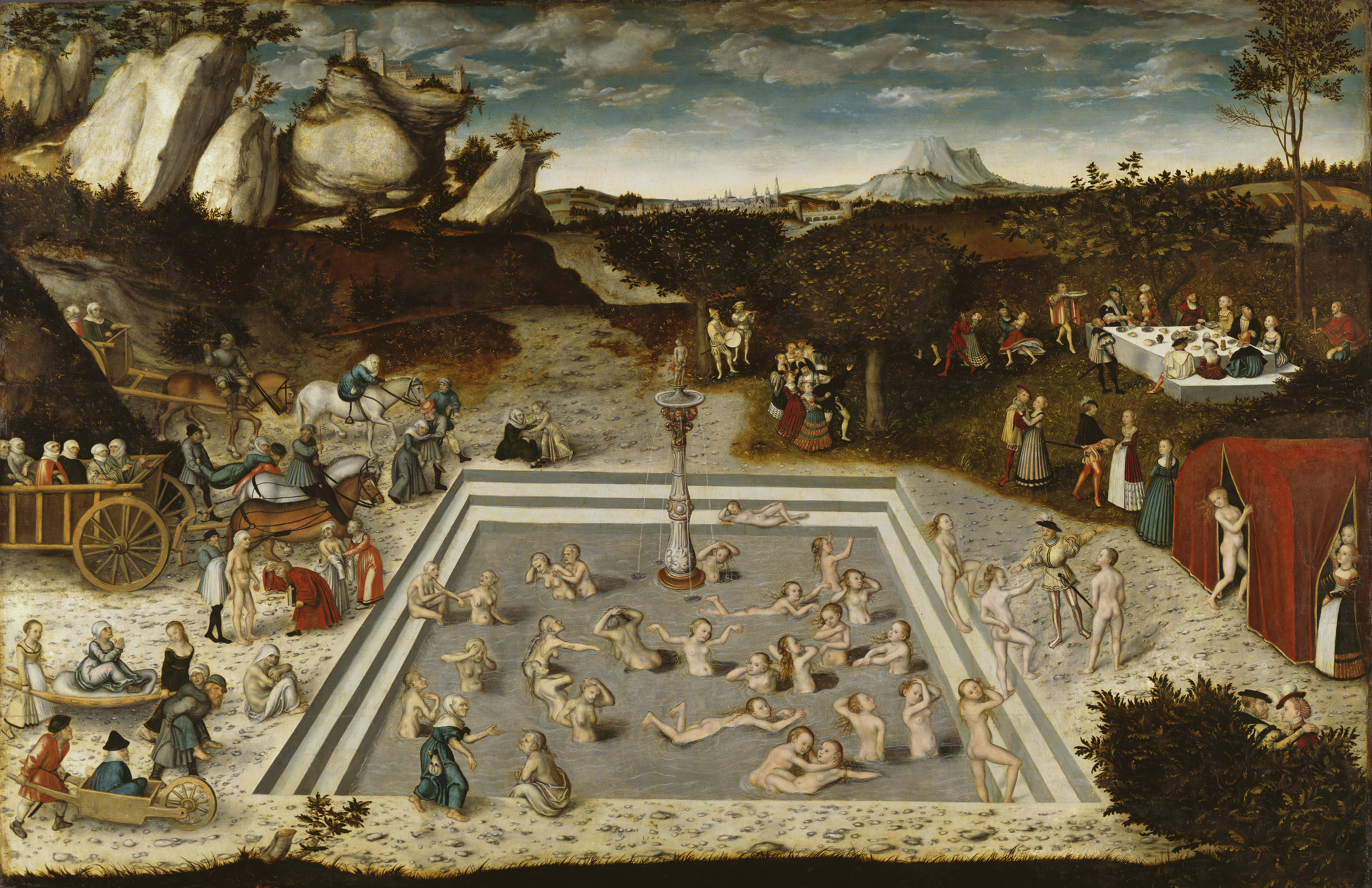
Lucas Cranach the Elder, The Fountain of Youth, 1546

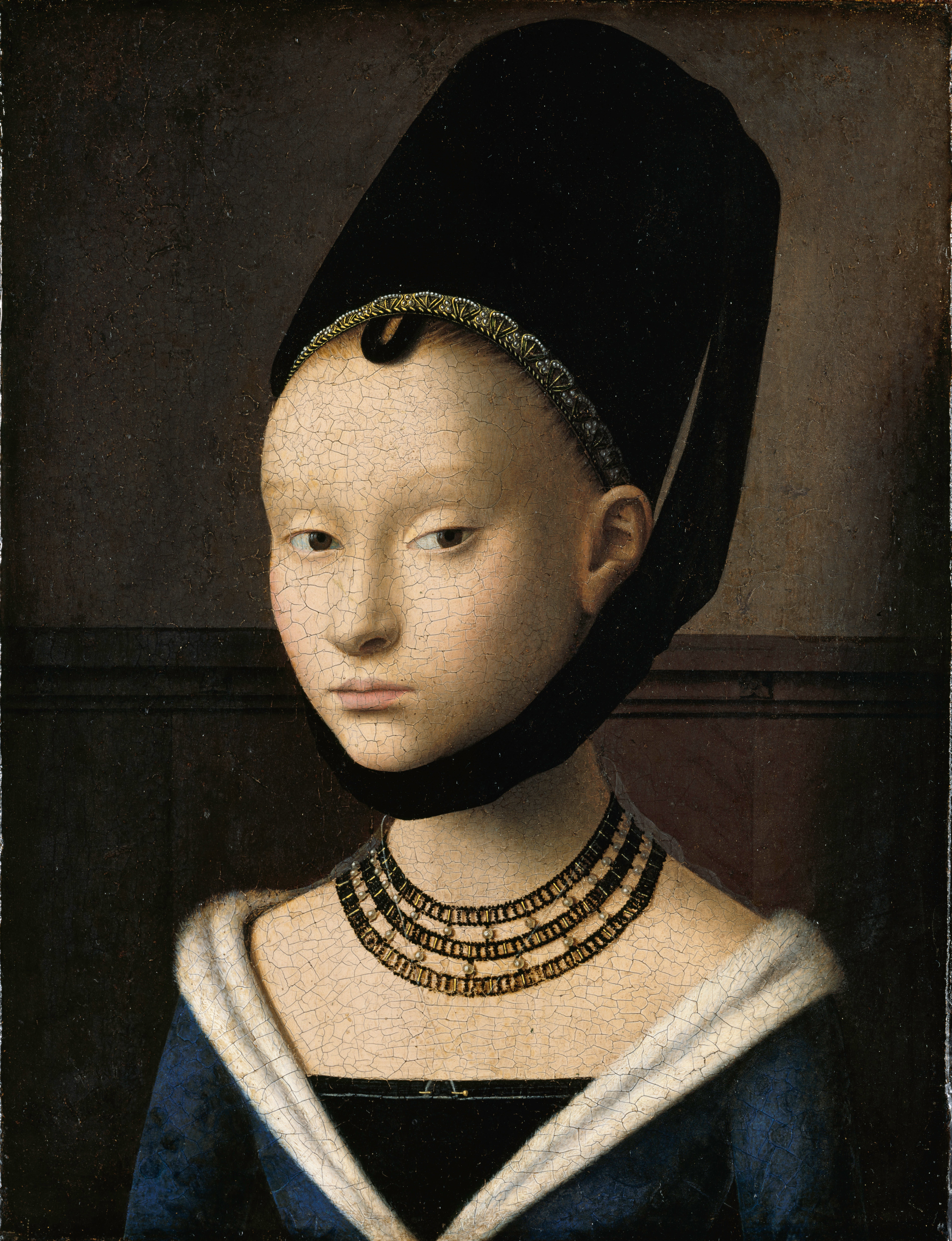
Petrus Christus, Portrait of a Young Girl, c. 1465

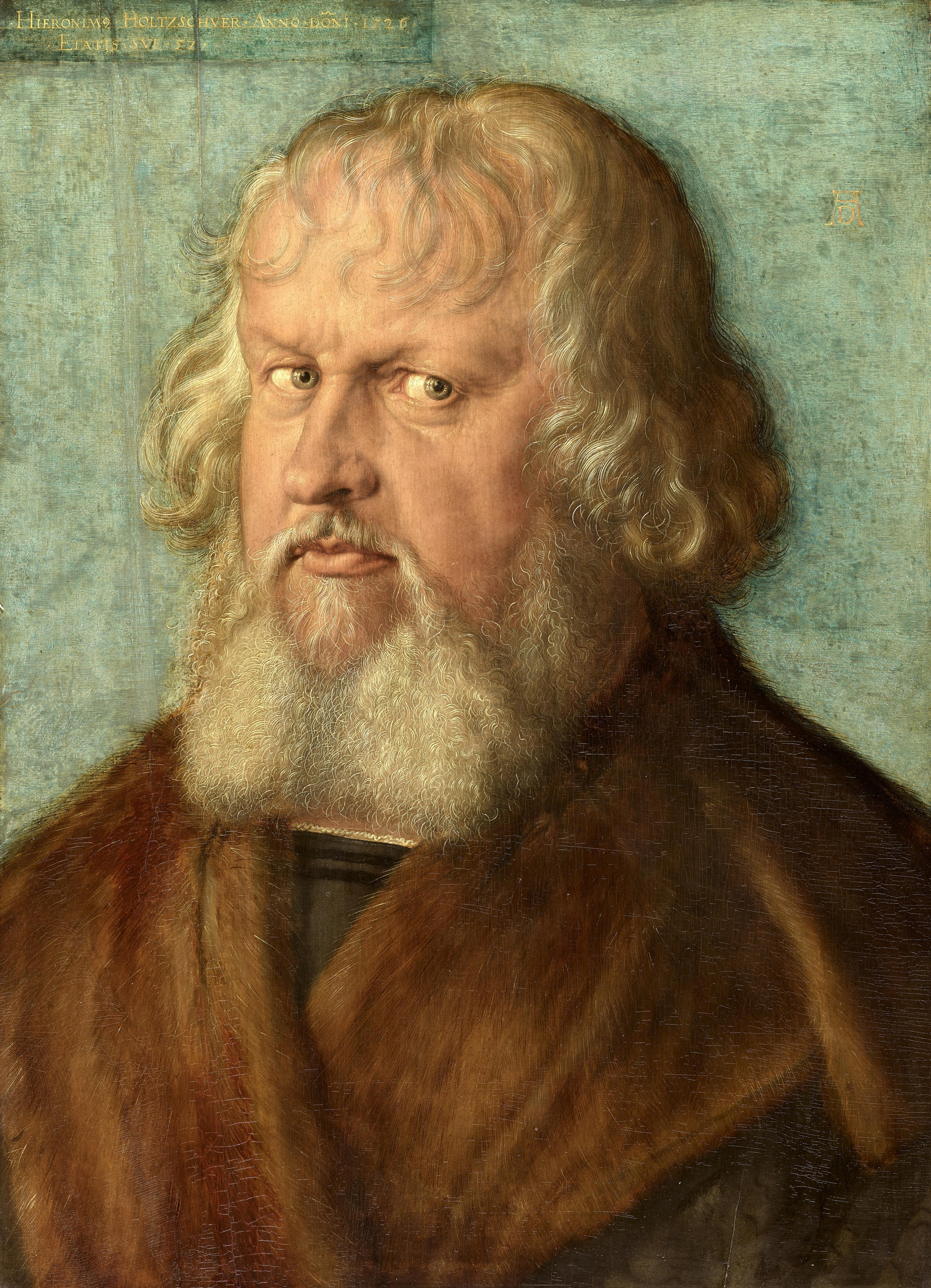
Albrecht Dürer, Portrait of Hieronymus Holzschuher, 1526

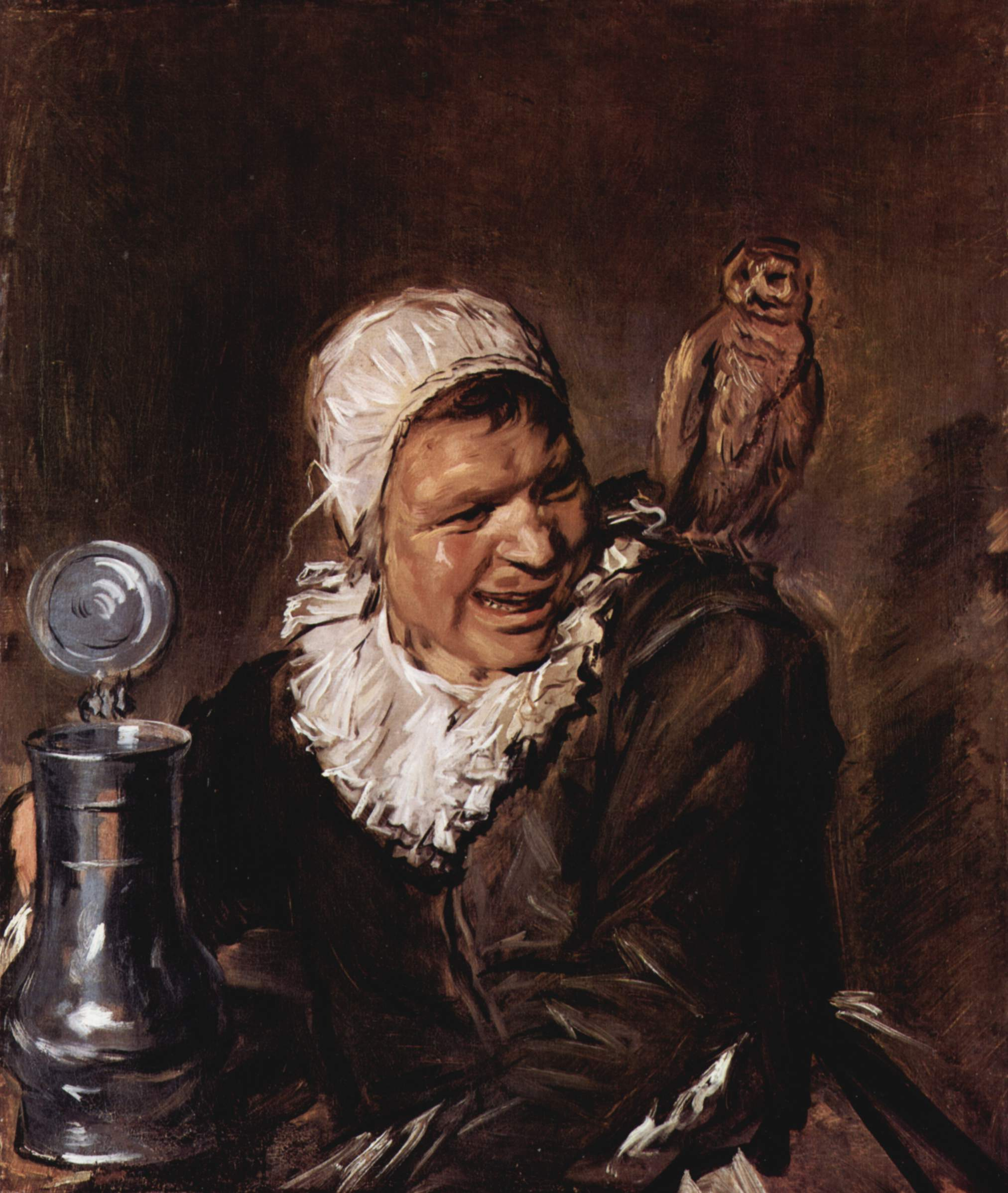
Frans Hals, Malle Babbe, c. 1633-35

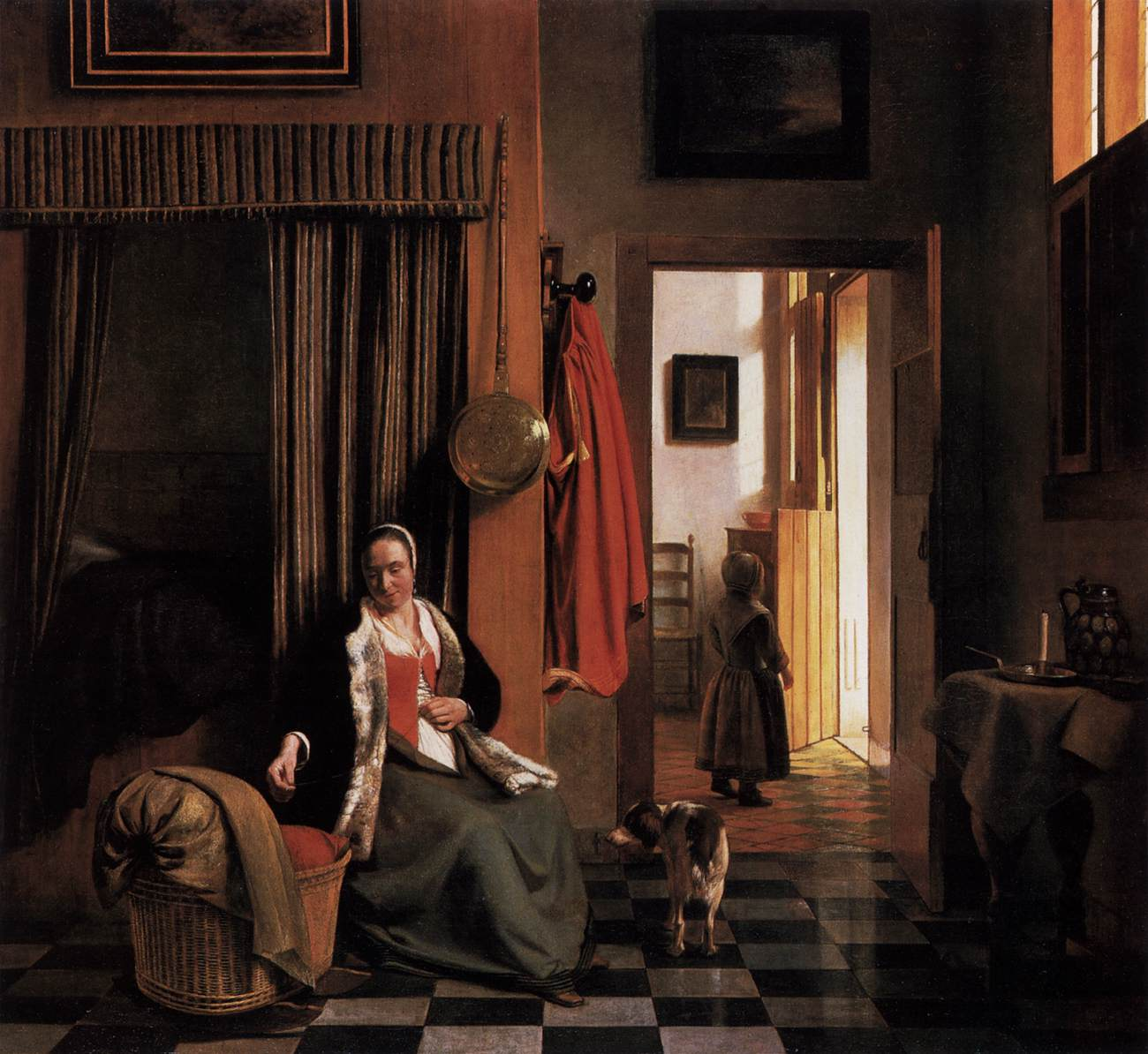
Pieter de Hooch, Woman Lacing Her Bodice Beside a Cradle, c. 1660-63

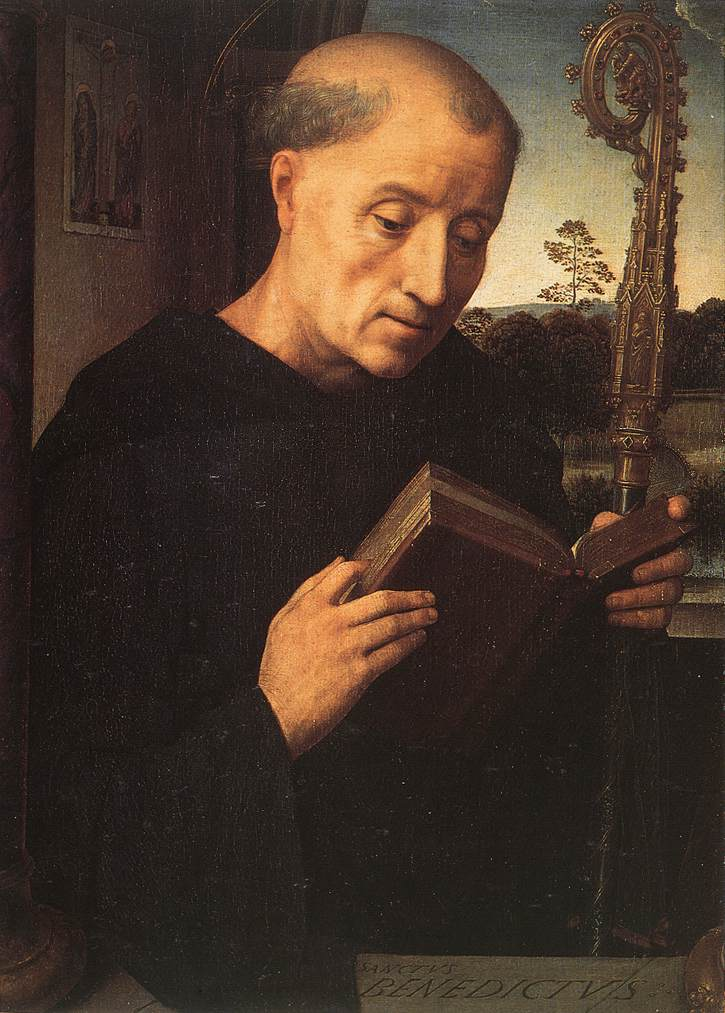
Hans Memling, St Benedict, 1487

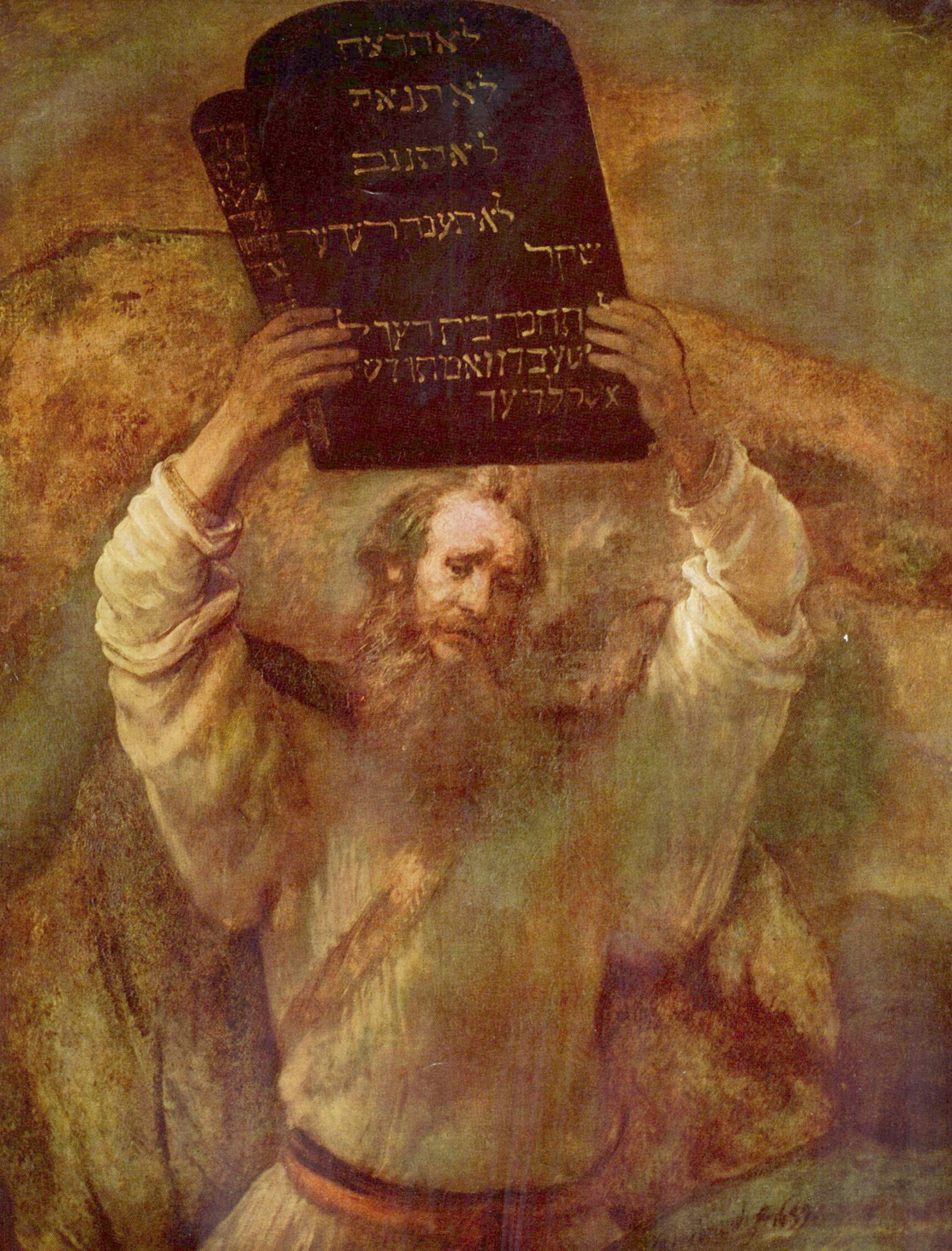
Rembrandt, Moses Breaking the Tablets of the Law, 1659

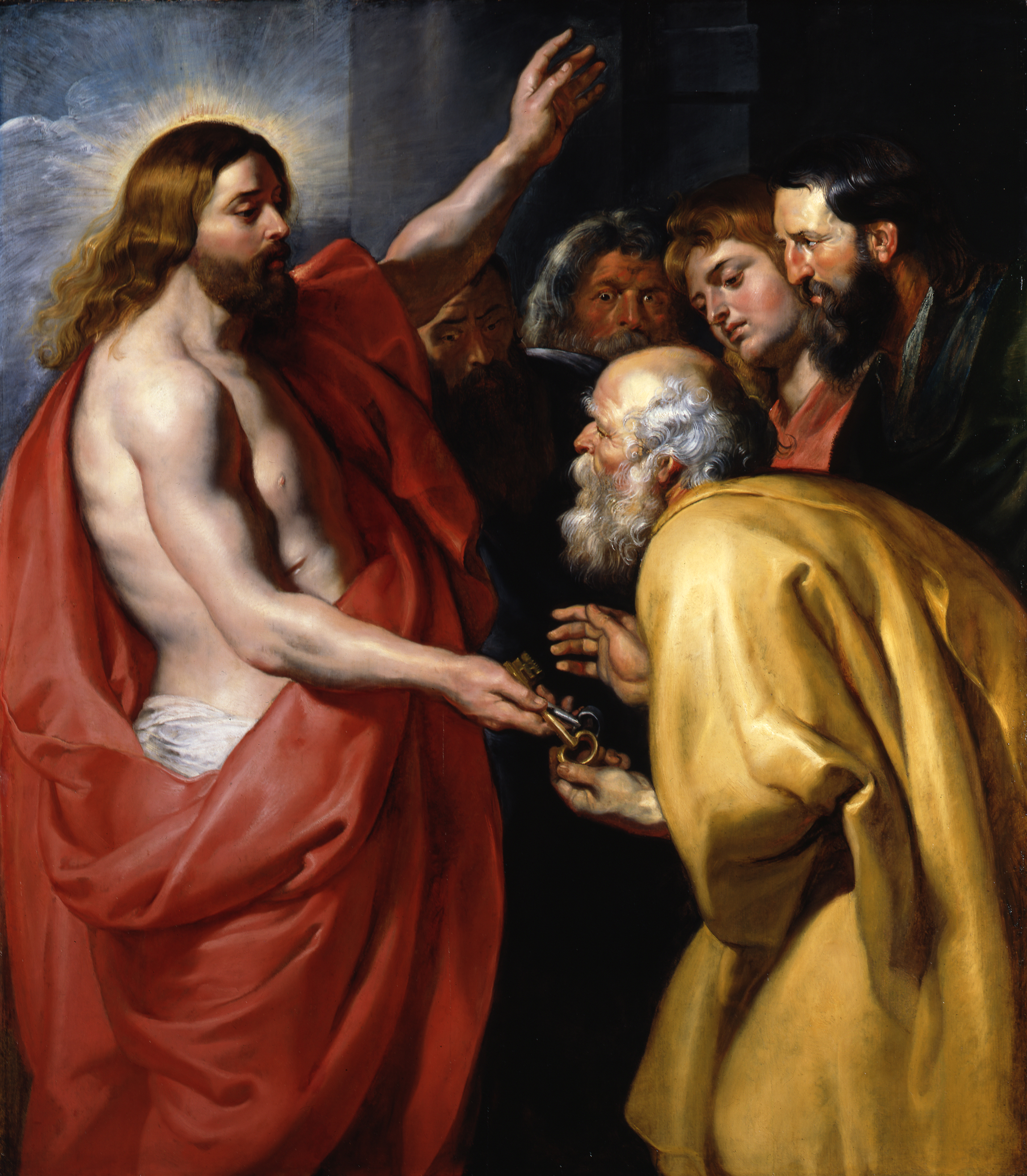
Peter Paul Rubens, Christ Giving the Keys to Saint Peter, c. 1612-1614

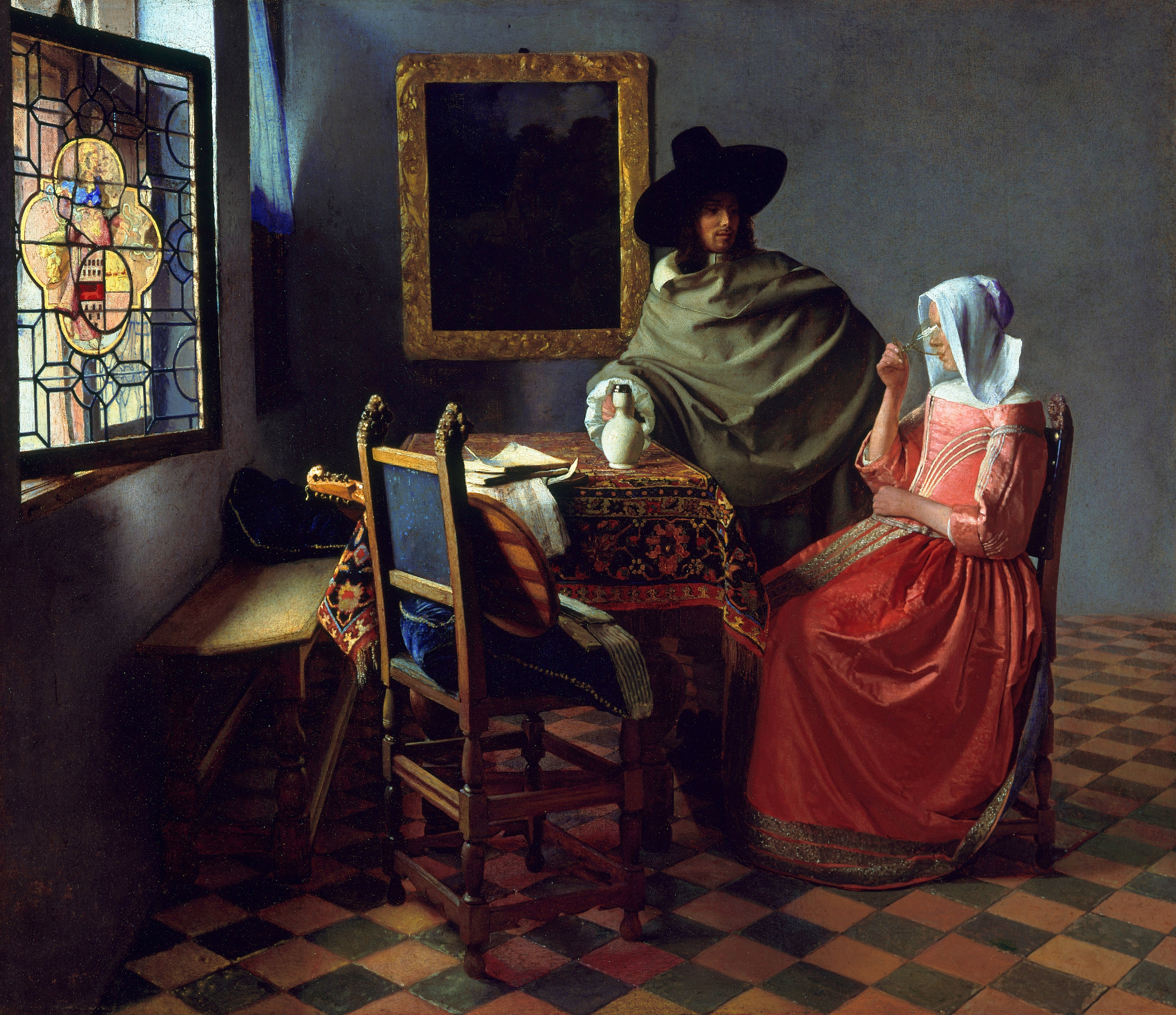
Johannes Vermeer, The Wine Glass, c. 1660

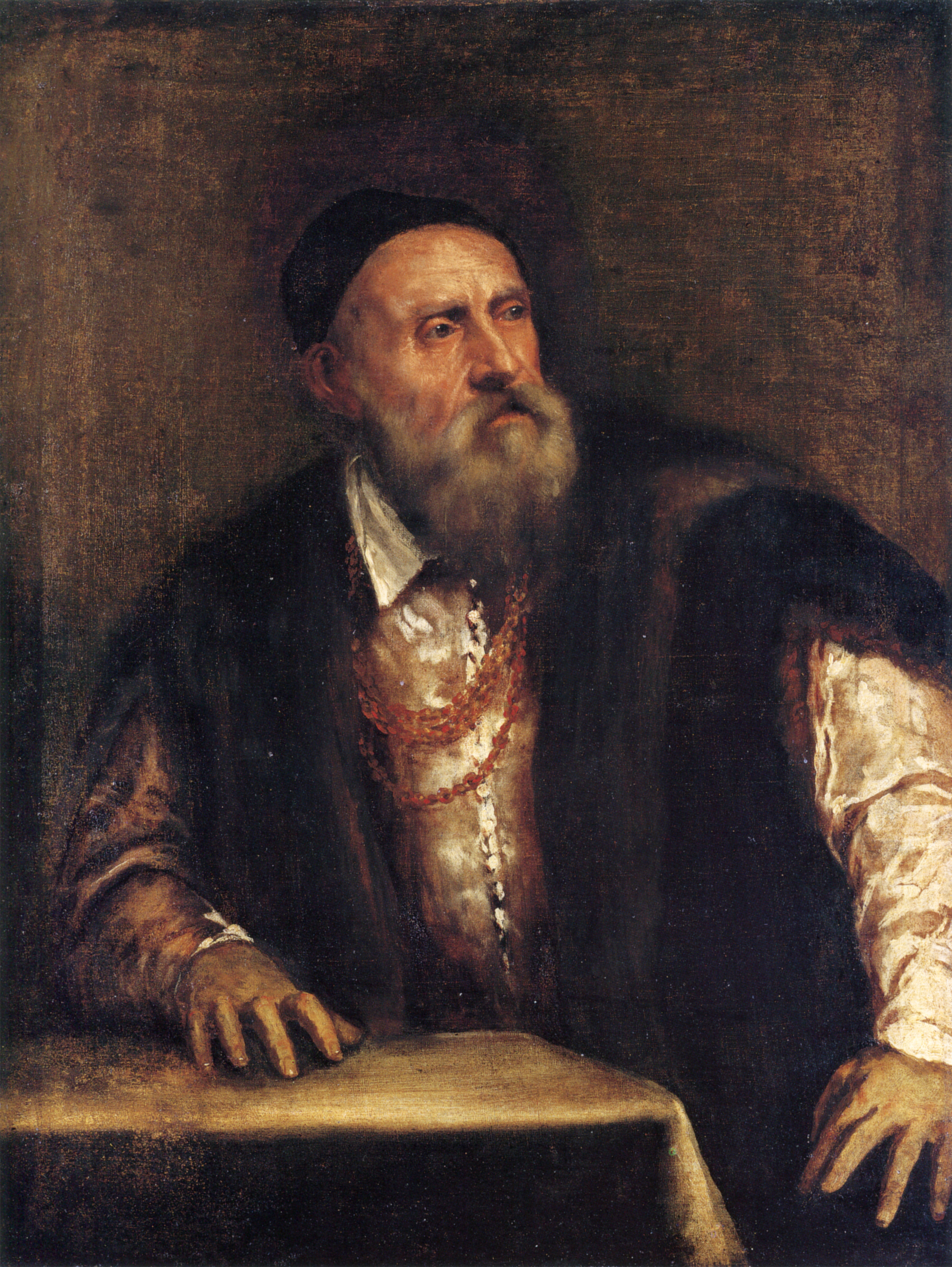
Titian, Self-Portrait, c. 1546-47

== See also ==
- List of art museums
- List of largest art museums
- List of museums in Berlin
- List of museums in Germany
