= Portrait of Johann Kleberger =

1526 oil painting by Albrecht Dürer

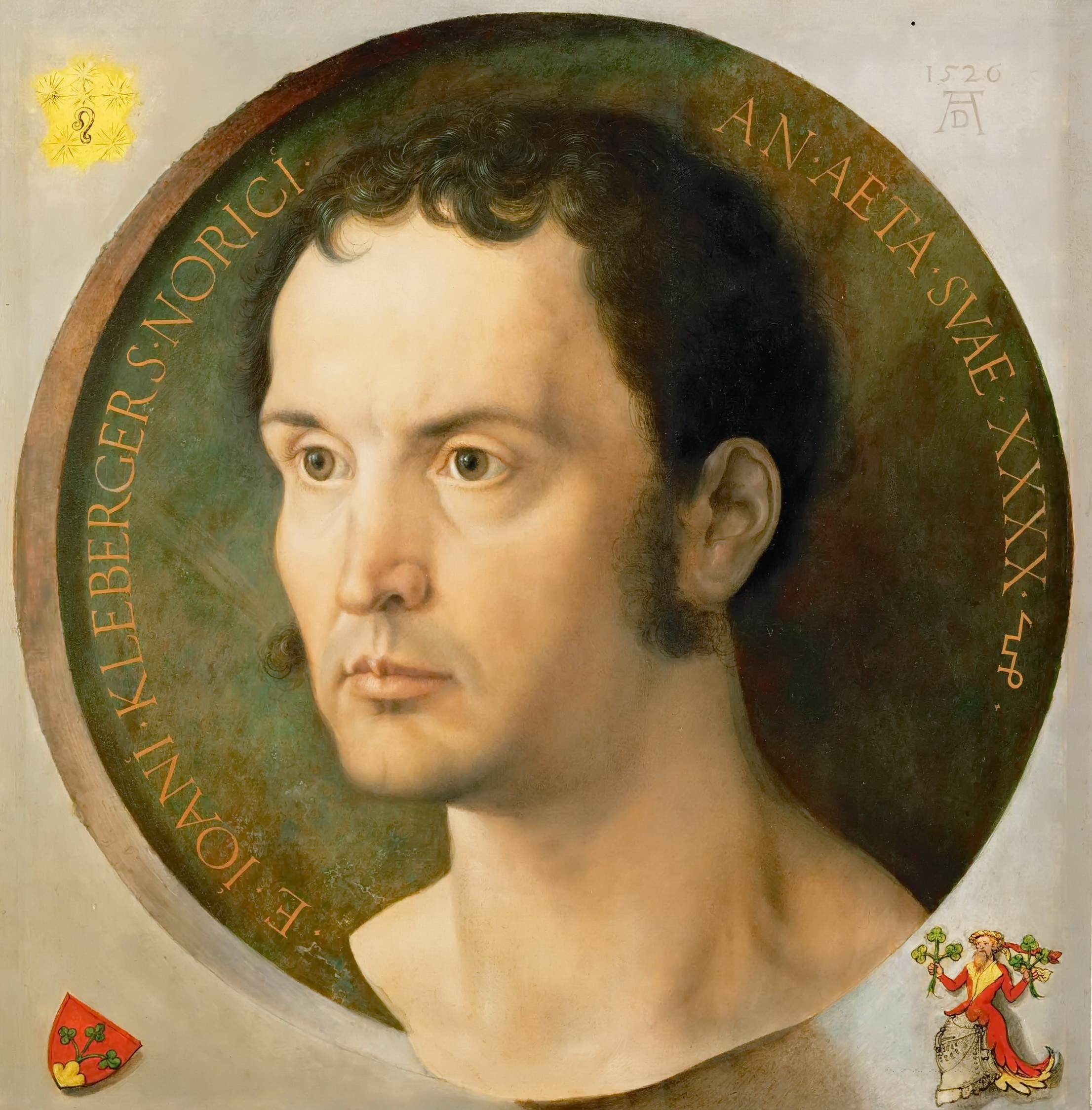
Portrait of Johann Kleberger (1526) by Albrecht Dürer

Portrait of Johann Kleberger is a 1526 oil on limewood panel painting by Albrecht Dürer, signed and dated by the artist and now in Kunsthistorisches Museum in Vienna.

The work was produced in Nuremberg the same year as he produced his portraits of Hieronymus Holzschuher and Jakob Muffel. Kleberger was a rich merchant and financier who had married the widowed daughter of Dürer's close friend Willibald Pirckheimer. On its subject's death the work passed to his stepson Willibal Imhof, who then sold it to Rudolf II, Holy Roman Emperor.

Painted in the format of a classical medal, possibly inspired by Hans Burgkmair's engravings of Roman medals, the artist shows his subject as a sculpture-like bust in a medallion in a circular gap in a trompe-l'œil wall. Inside the circle is the inscription E. IOANI KLEBERGERS NORIKER UN AETA SVAE XXXX, with heraldic motifs in three of the corners and the date 1526 and the artist's monogram in the fourth corner.

== See also ==
- List of paintings by Albrecht Dürer
