= Portrait of Jakob Muffel =

1526 painting by Albrecht Dürer

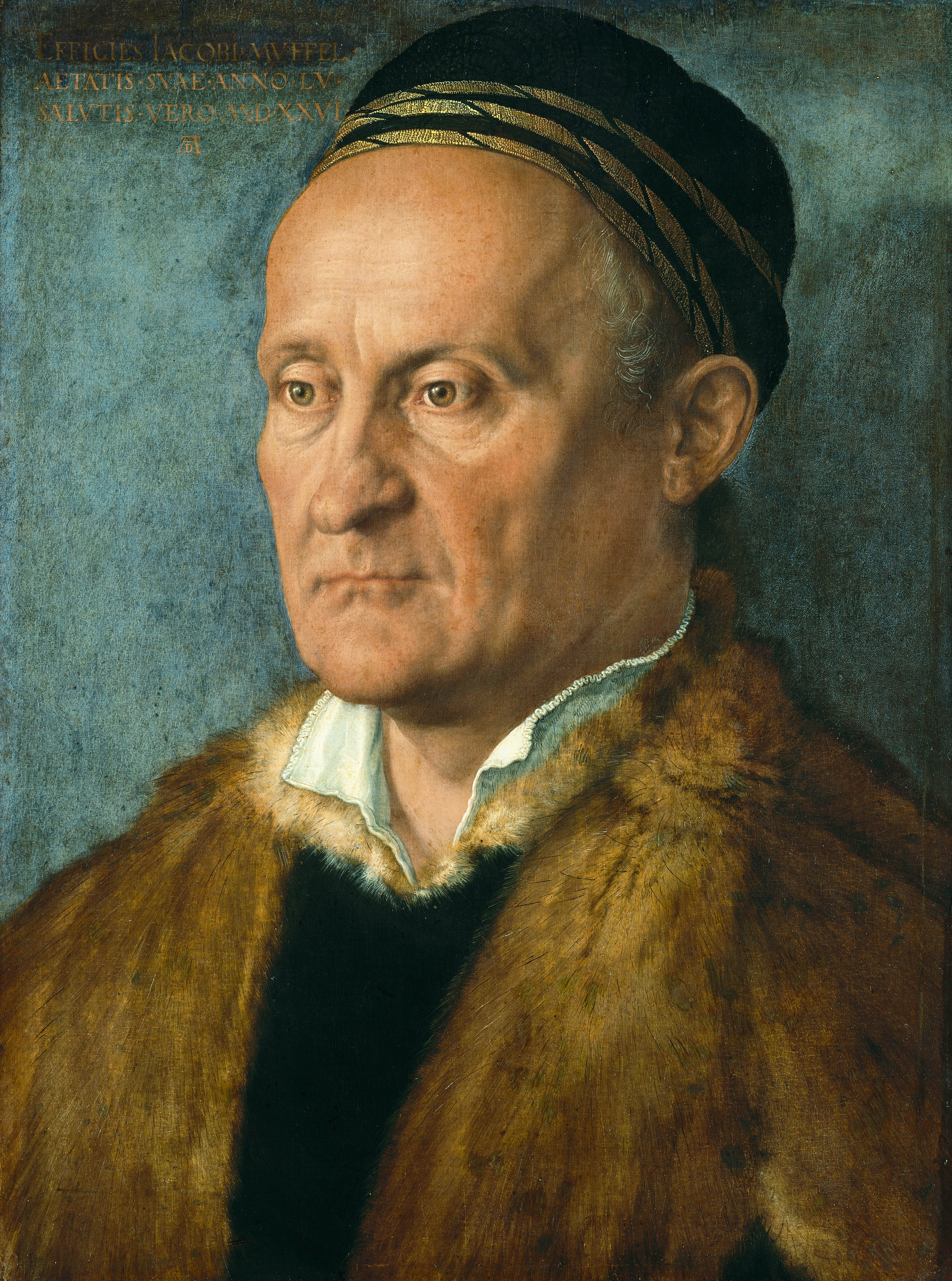
- Artist: Albrecht Dürer
- Year: 1526
- Type: Oil on panel transferred to canvas
- Dimensions: 48 cm × 36 cm (19 in × 14 in)
- Location: Gemäldegalerie, Berlin

The Portrait of Jakob Muffel is a painting by German Renaissance master Albrecht Dürer, signed and dated from 1526, now housed in the Gemäldegalerie of Berlin, Germany.

The work was executed in Nuremberg, the same year in which the German artist portrayed Johann Kleberger and Hieronymus Holzschuher. Jakob Muffel was burgomaster of the city in the year in which Dürer had donated it his four panels of The Four Apostles and the two paintings are perhaps related to each other.

The panel is the same size as the portrait of Holzschuher and it has thus been speculated that they may have been commissioned for an official celebration and exhibited at the city's town hall.

== See also ==
- List of paintings by Albrecht Dürer

== Sources ==
- Costantino Porcu, ed. (2004). Dürer. Milan: Rizzoli.
