= The Four Apostles =

1526 diptych by Albrecht Dürer

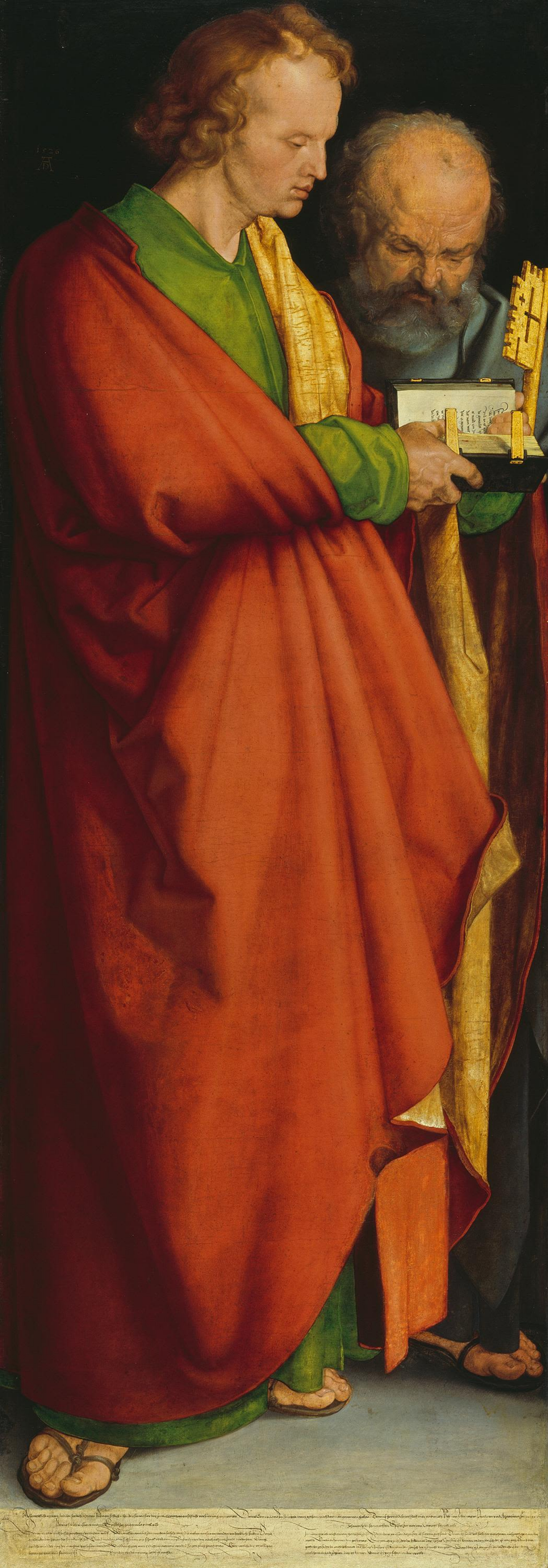
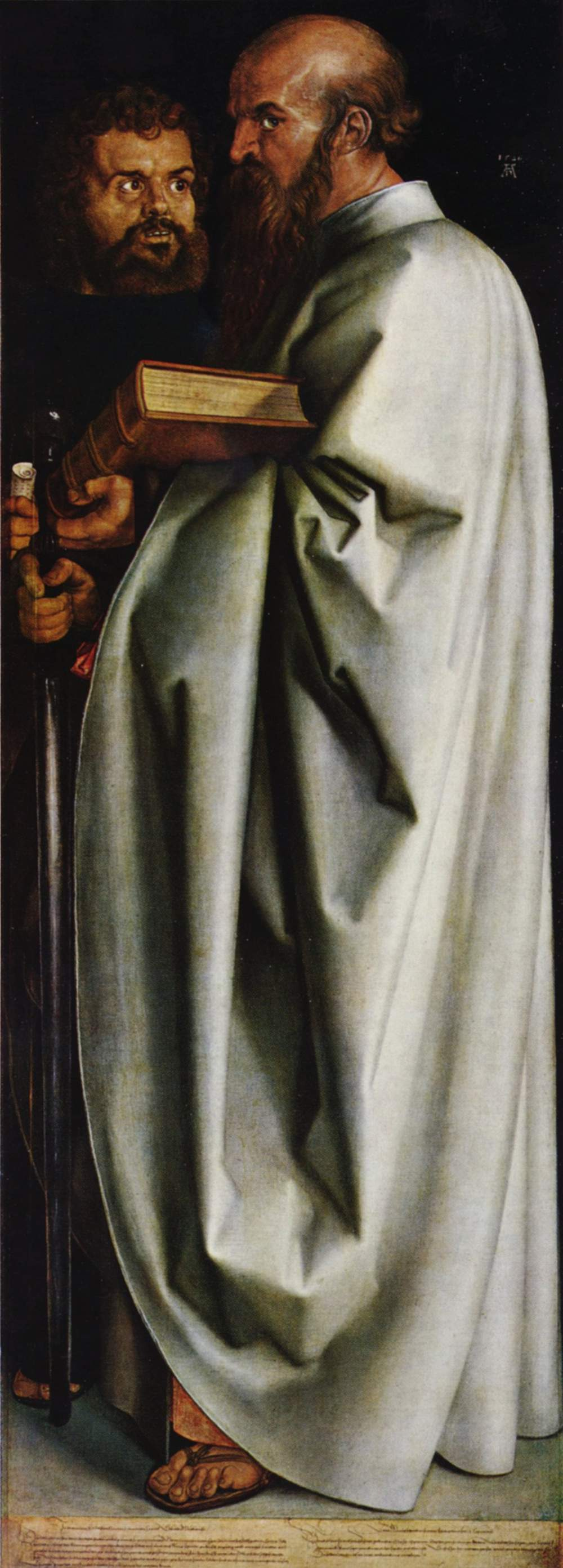
The Four Apostles, Albrecht Dürer, 1526. Each panel 215 cm × 76 cm (85 in × 30 in), oil on lindenwood. Alte Pinakothek, Munich.

The Four Apostles by is a Renaissance style diptych painting created by Albrecht Dürer in 1526. This work, which includes two oil-on-panel paintings, depicts four prominent figures of Christianity: Saints John, Peter, Mark, and Paul. While the painting is known for its largescale size and reflection of the emerging humanist ideals of the time, the piece is also an early example of Dürer's conversion to, and support of, Protestantism. Originally gifted to the city of Nuremberg, the panels also serve as a visual statement of Dürer's Protestant sympathies, emphasizing the authority of scripture. The painting is currently housed in Munich at the Alte Pinakothek. While the painting is titled The Four Apostles, only John and Peter are strictly apostles, Saint Mark is actually Evangelist, and Paul a missionary.

== Description ==
The two paintings that make up this diptych are both done in a Northern Renaissance style and are the last of Dürer's largescale works. Each panel is 215 cm x 76 cm and features two figures standing in each panel. Saints John and Peter are depicted in the left panel; the figures in the right panel are Saints Mark and Paul. The former are shown reading from the opening page of John's own Gospel, and the latter both appear alert; however, only Paul, the father of Theology, seems to have recognized the spectator. At the bottom of each panel, quotations from the Bible are inscribed that relate to the Protestant Reformation that inspired Dürer to create this piece. Dürer chose to represent each of the apostles with striking realism and faces that resembled those of everyday people, in favor of the typical proportional perfection seen in other Renaissance works.

== Symbolism ==
External videos
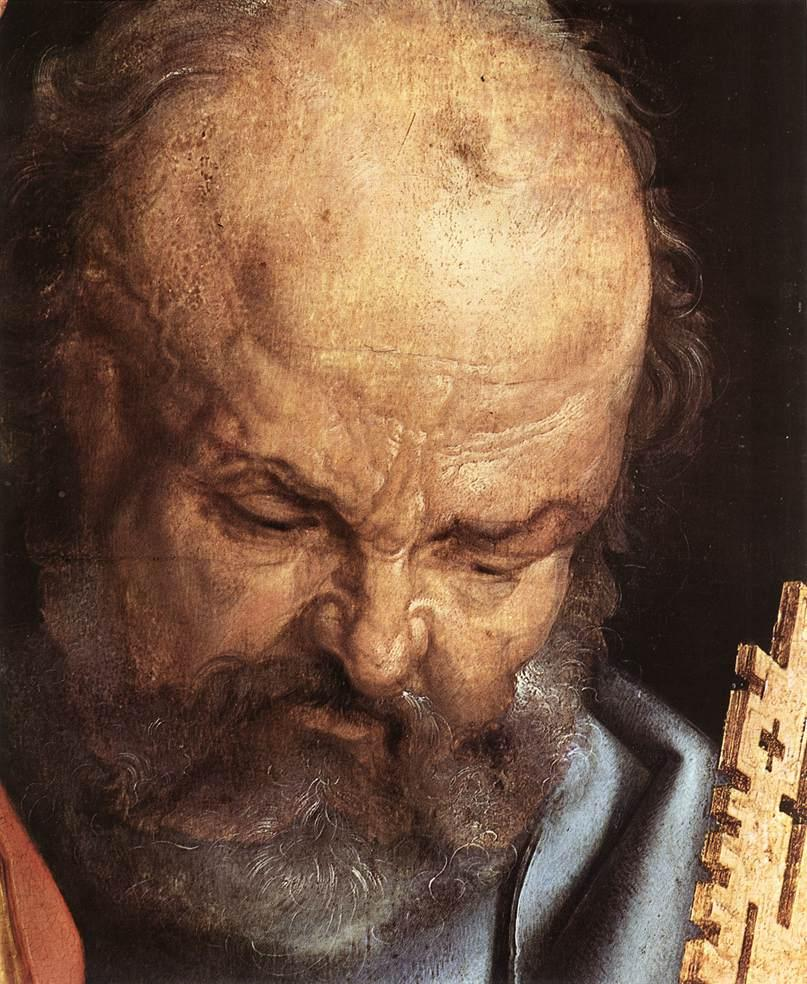
- Smarthistory – Dürer's The Four Apostles

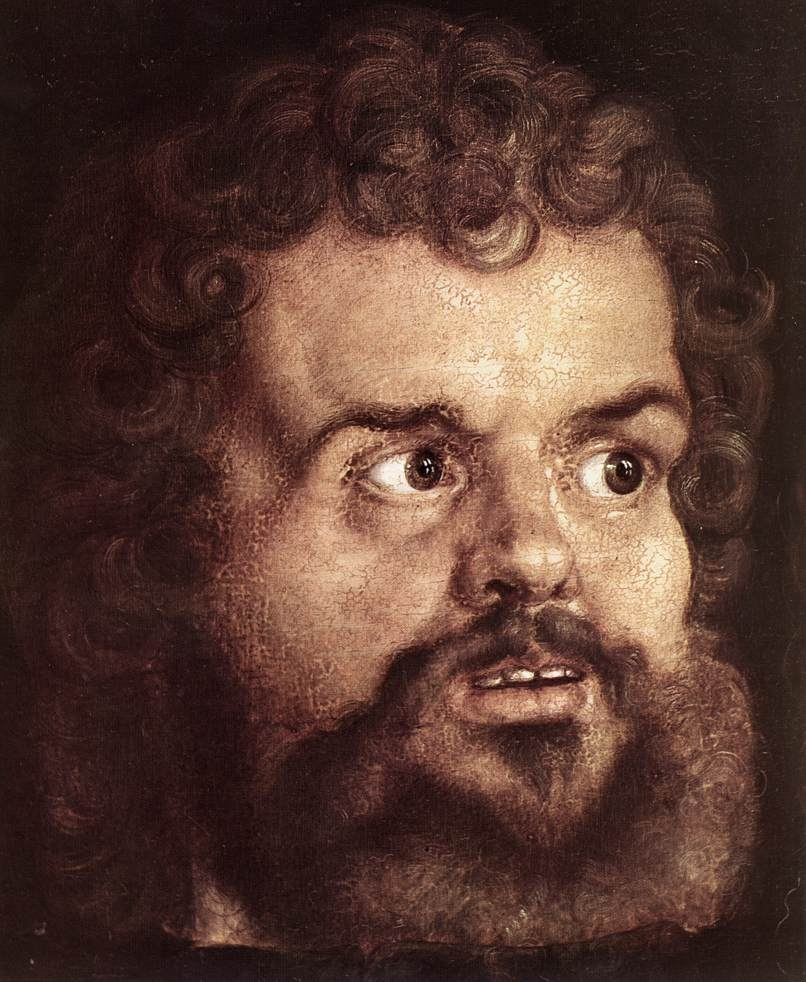
St. Paul detail

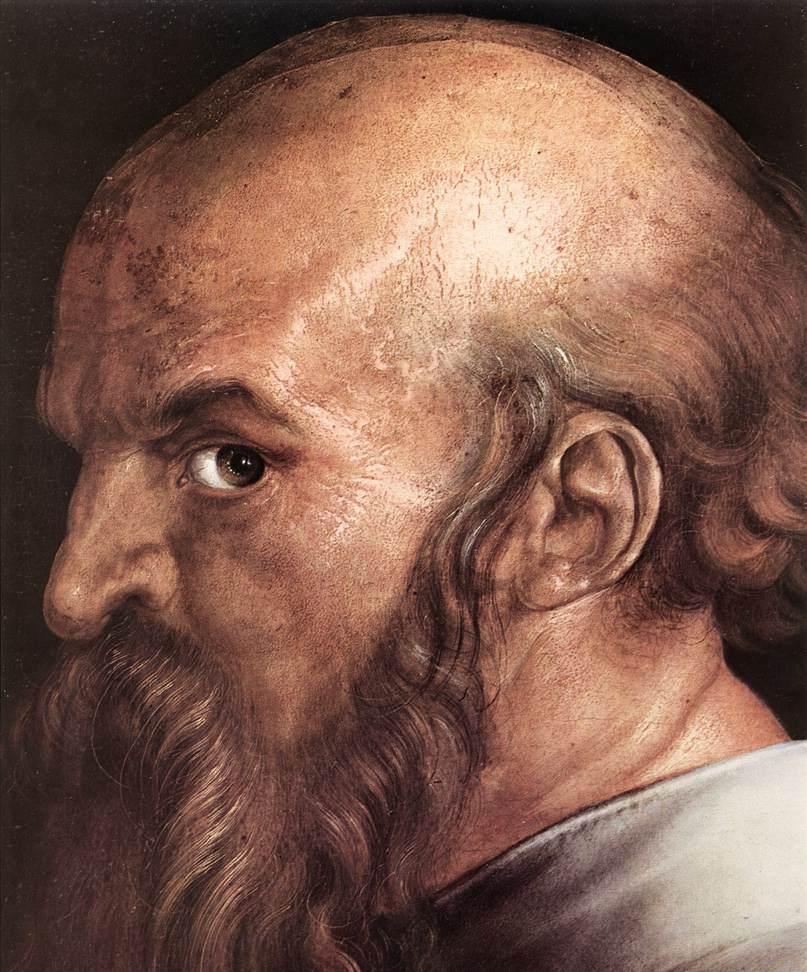
St. Mark detail

Dürer included various symbols within this painting that are associated with each of the apostles. These symbols were attributed to their respective saints not only as a means of identification, but to also personify the mission of the Protestant Reformation Dürer had recently joined.

The symbols associated with each apostle are:

- St. John the Evangelist: Open book
- St. Peter: Key
- St. Mark: Scroll
- St. Paul: Sword and Closed book

The key held by St. Peter was painted by Dürer to represent the keys to the kingdom of Heaven. The key serves as a means of unlocking Heaven, which before the Reformation would have only been accessible through the Papacy. The scroll held by St. Mark is a representation of his own gospel. The reference to the scroll was also a means of transitioning from one older, more traditional way of thought to that of the Reformation - a new true way of worship. St. Paul holds both the sword and closed book. The sword is depicted here to signify St. Paul's status as a martyr, while the book represents the New Testament letters he wrote while he was imprisoned. The Bible, the living word of God, is depicted here as a representation of the Christian law and source to salvation. In contrast to the key held by St. Peter, which was only unlocked through the Papacy, the Bible held by St. John reflects the idea of the average person having an open relationship with God. In addition to the idea of direct access to God, the Dürer also uses the Bible to signify to viewers the ever presence of the word of God.

The apostles are also associated with the four temperaments. These pairings were made to further reinforce the message of the reformation and help by differentiating between the old way of worship, the two apostles positioned in the back, and the newer, beliefs of Martin Luther. To Dürer, ascribing the characteristics of the two positive temperaments to the apostles John and Paul would have meant an open endorsement of the teachings of Martin Luther. Because of the clarity of balance that is created between the temperaments when they are placed together, adding the four characteristics to the four apostles would have signified the purity of Protestantism.

The temperaments associated with each apostle are:

- St. John: sanguine
- St. Peter: phlegmatic
- St. Mark: choleric
- St. Paul: melancholic

=== Inscriptions ===
The inscriptions painted at the bottom of the painting by Dürer were placed not only as references to the Reformation, but also as warnings about dangerous theology such as heresy and Pharisaism. One of the inscriptions reads as follows:

All worldly rulers in these dangerous times should give good heed that they receive not human misguidance for the Word of God, for God will have nothing added to His Word nor taken away from it.

These words were seen as controversial by prominent Jesuit leaders in the court of Munich's monarch Maximillian. These Catholic Jesuits rejected Dürer's warnings of terror as attacks on their faith, and their position in the court. To appease the Jesuits, Maximillian had this portion of the painting removed to appease them and quell any messaging associated with pharisaism.

=== Saint Paul vs. Saint Phillip ===
In an earlier version of this work, Durer chose to depict St. Phillip in the place of St. Paul. When Durer began painting The Four Apostles, he decided to change the depiction of St. Phillip to that of Saint Paul. This decision was made to emphasize the new direction of Protestantism he felt Christianity should take, with the apostle Paul being more representative of this new order. He did so by painting him with a bald head, long, flowing beard, and a strong, aquiline nose. Durer also replaced the originally depicted staff with a sword; the traditional item used to identify St. Paul.

== Historical context ==
The Four Apostles was created during the Reformation, begun in 1517 and having the largest initial impact on Germany, the work was completed in 1526. During this time, Dürer had himself left the Catholic church and transitioned to Protestantism. Some Protestants believed that icons were contradictory to the Word of God, which was held in the utmost supremacy over, thus some Protestant churches would not patron any sacred art to discourage the worship of images and false idols. Because of this belief, Dürer made both paintings of his own volition. They were not commissioned like his other works. When the paintings were completed, Dürer presented them to the town of Nuremberg, where they were accepted by elders and later displayed at town hall.

Attached to the painting was a letter written by Dürer which read as follows:

Prudent, honourable, wise, dear Masters. I have been intending, for a long time past, to show my respect for your Wisdoms by the presentation of some humble picture of mine as a remembrance; but I have been prevented from so doing by the imperfection and insignificance of my works, for I felt that with such I could not well stand before your Wisdoms. Now, however, that I have just painted a panel upon which I have bestowed more trouble than on any other painting, I considered none more worthy to keep it as a reminiscence than your Wisdoms. Therefore I present it to your Wisdoms with the humble and urgent prayer that you will favourably and graciously receive it, and will be and continue, as I have ever found you, my kind and dear Masters. Thus shall I be diligent to serve your Wisdoms in all humility. Your Wisdoms' humble Albrecht Dürer

— Albrecht Dürer

Many aspects of the image depicted prove significant in light of the Reformation itself. Durer placed Peter, often held as the symbol of the papacy, behind John the Evangelist. Both men read from the Scriptures, which Luther upheld as the sole authority for doctrine in the Church. Durer also placed quotations from Luther's translation of the German New Testament on the panel beneath the Apostles. Dürer's commitment to his new Protestant identity is further evidenced by placing the saints Paul and John, who were believed to be the most influential to Luther, at the foreground of the painting.

This painting has had many speculations as to Durer's intentions, one being that it was his way of creating a sort of worthy legacy piece. When Dürer moved back to Nuremberg he produced many famous paintings there, including several self-portraits. He gave The Four Apostles to the town council.

== See also ==
- List of paintings by Albrecht Dürer
- Portrait of Jakob Muffel—A Dürer painting of the same year

== Sources ==
- "Albert Durer." The Illustrated Magazine of Art, vol. 2, no. 11, 1853, pp. 277–82. JSTOR 20538135. Accessed 2 Oct. 2024.
- "Albert Durer." The Illustrated Magazine of Art, vol. 3, no. 13, 1854, pp. 57–70. JSTOR 20538210. Accessed 2 Oct. 2024.
- Deuchler, Florens. "ALBRECHT DÜRER." The Print Collector's Newsletter, vol. 2, no. 1, 1971, pp. 4–5. JSTOR 44130079. Accessed 2 Oct. 2024.
- Wolf, Norbert. Albrecht Dürer, 1471-1528. Taschen America Llc, 2010. ISBN 978-3-7913-4426-3.
- Price, David Hotchkiss. Albrecht Dürer's Renaissance: Humanism, Reformation and the Art of Faith. Michigan, 2003. ISBN 978-0-4721-1343-9.
- Dr. Steven Zucker and Dr. Beth Harris, "Albrecht Dürer, The Four Apostles" in Smarthistory, December 9, 2015, accessed October 7, 2024.
