= Nicolaus van Aelst =

Flemish engraver

Nicolaus van Aelst (c. 1526 – 19 July 1613) was a Flemish engraver and perhaps painter, and a resident of Rome.

== Life ==
Van Aelst was born in Brussels. At an early age he established himself at Rome, where from 1550 to 1612 he carried out a considerable commerce in prints.

The names of the painter, and the engraver of the plates, executed for his collection, were frequently omitted, and his own inserted, with the word formis, to denote that he was the publisher. Many of the plates had previously been issued by other publishers. He printed several plates that had previously been owned by Antonio Salamanca, which Van Aelst may have acquired from Salamanca's heir, Francesco Salamanca. There is, however, evidence that he produced some work as an engraver himself, as on several plates the word fecit, or sculpsit, is added to his name. Carl Heinrich von Heineken mentions a set of twelve plates of birds engraved by him.

He died in Rome on 19 July 1613
