= Portrait of Hieronymus Holzschuher =

1526 painting by Albrecht Dürer

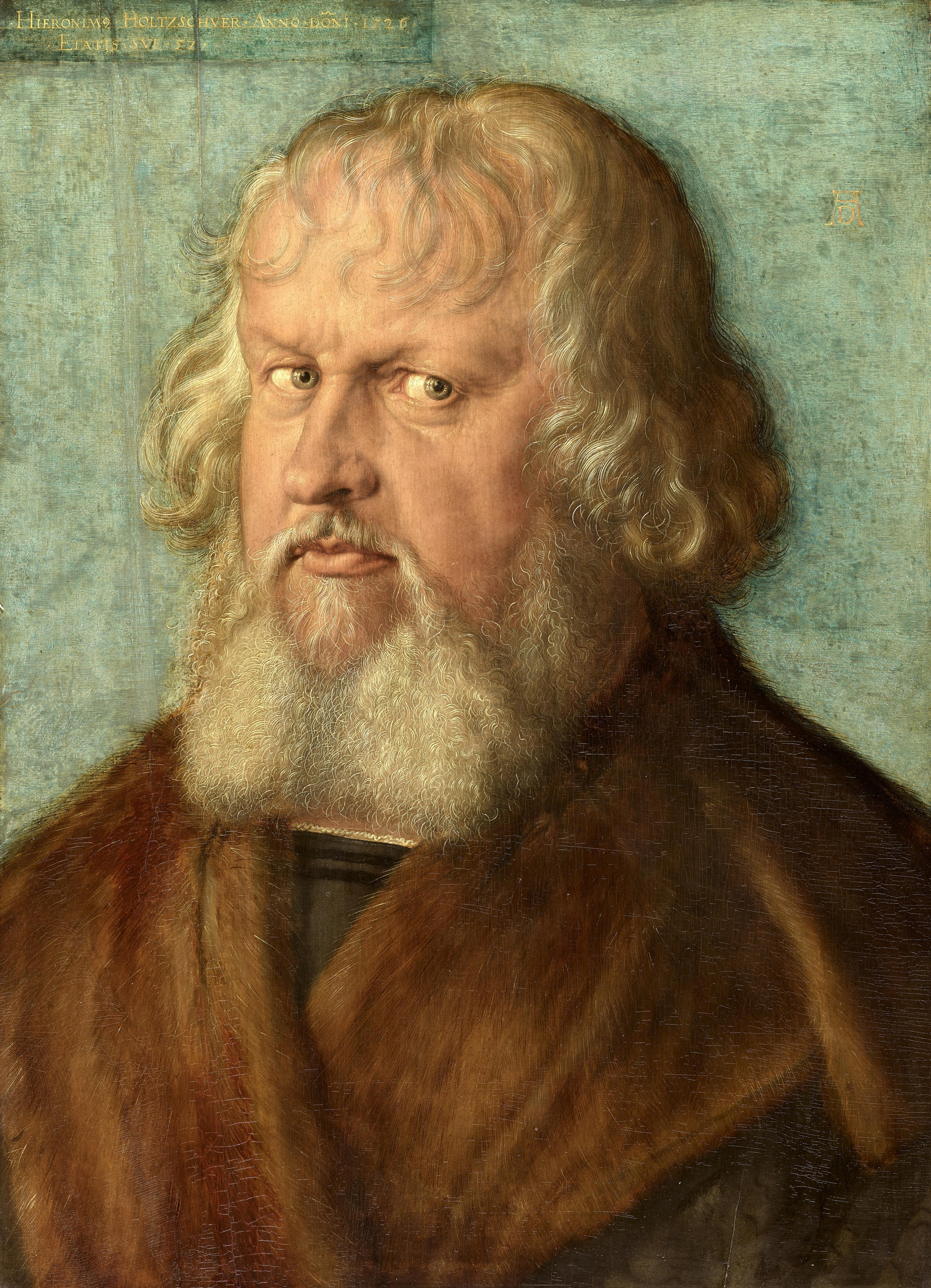
- Artist: Albrecht Dürer
- Year: 1526
- Medium: Oil on panel
- Dimensions: 48 cm × 36 cm (19 in × 14 in)
- Location: Gemäldegalerie, Berlin

The Portrait of Hieronymus Holzschuher is a painting by German Renaissance master Albrecht Dürer, dated from 1526, now housed in the Gemäldegalerie of Berlin, Germany. The signature is in the upper left corner, and reads HIERONIMVS HOLTZSCHVER ANNO DO[MI]NI 1526 ETATIS SVE 57.

The work was executed in Nuremberg, the same year in which the German artist portrayed Johann Kleberger and Jakob Muffel. Holzschuher was a local patrician who was senator and septemvir in its councils.

The panel has the same dimensions as the portrait of Muffel, and thus it has been speculated that they could have been commissioned for some official celebration and exhibited in the city's town hall.

== See also ==
- List of paintings by Albrecht Dürer

== Sources ==
- Costantino Porcu, ed. (2004). Dürer. Milan: Rizzoli.
