= Six statues from the Church of St. Nicholas in Cheb =

Set of six statues from the Church of St. Nicholas in Cheb (1480s-90s)

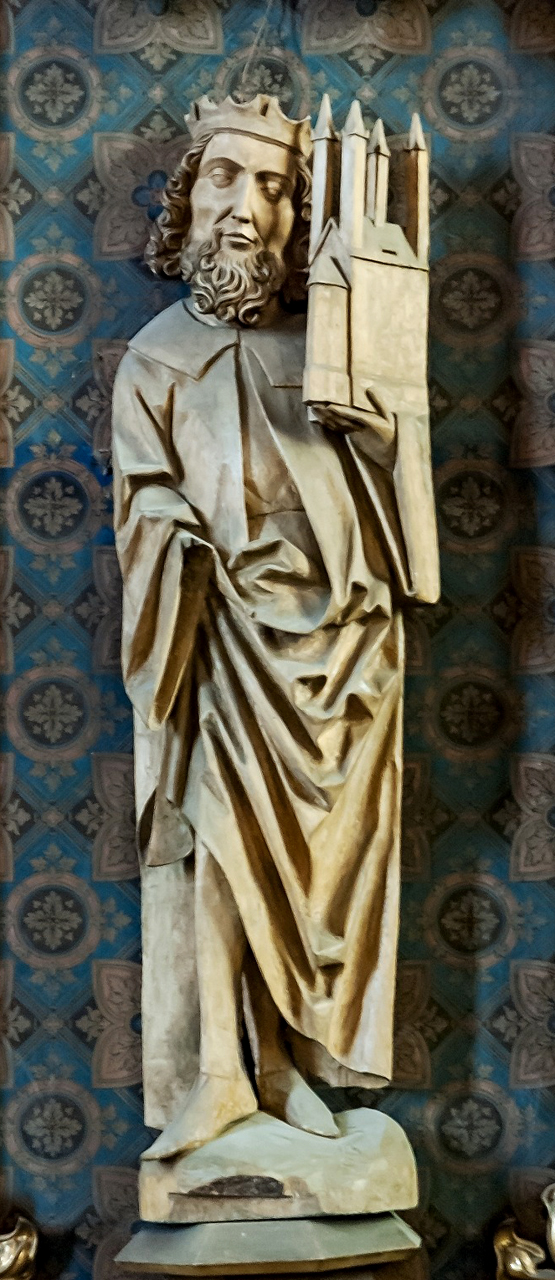
St. Henry

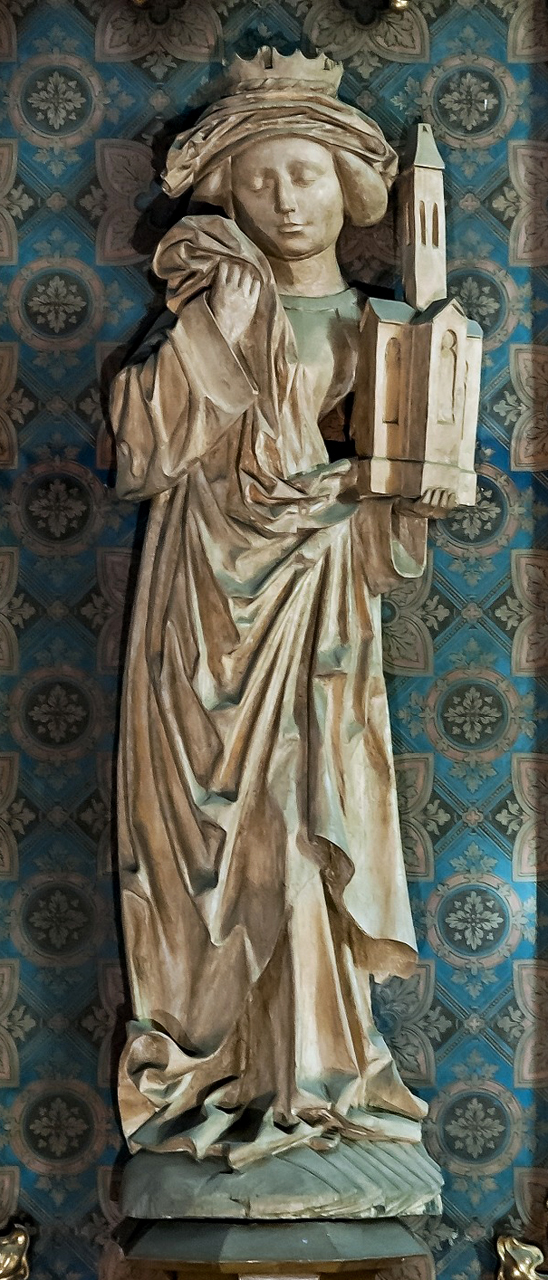
St. Cunigunde

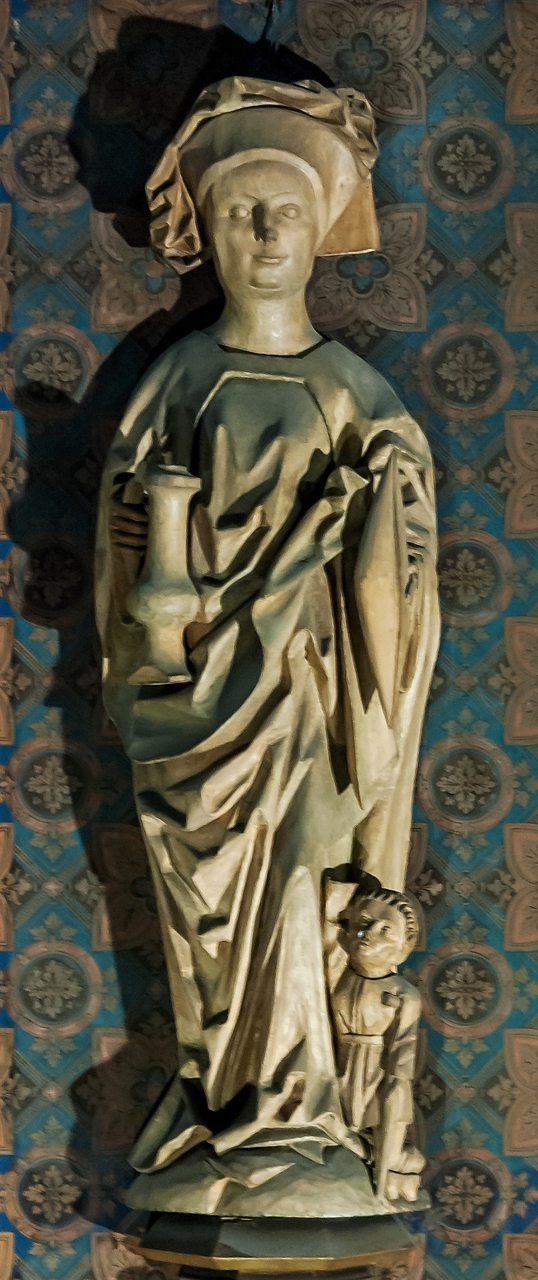
St. Elizabeth of Thuringia

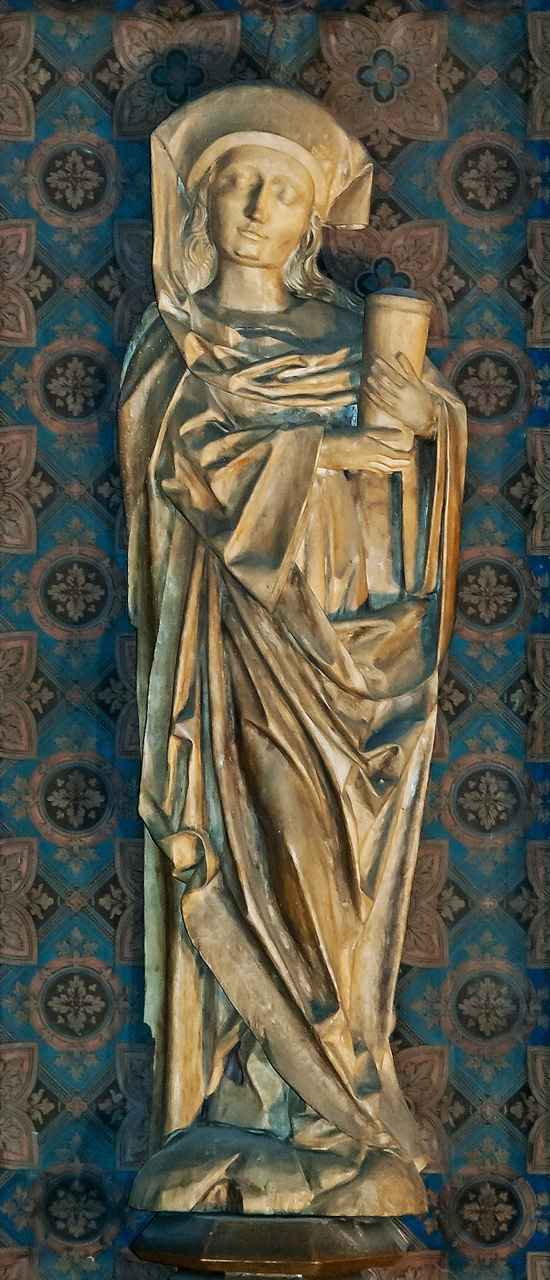
St. Mary Magdalene

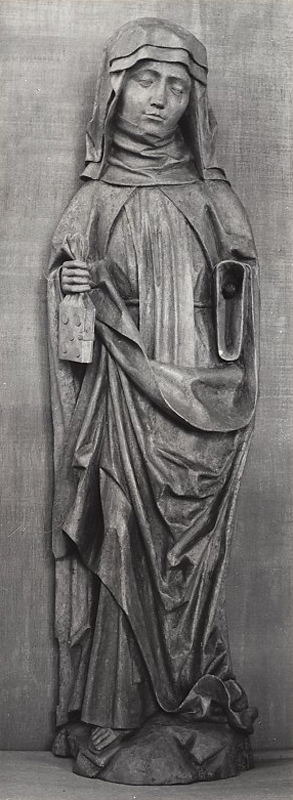
St. Clare

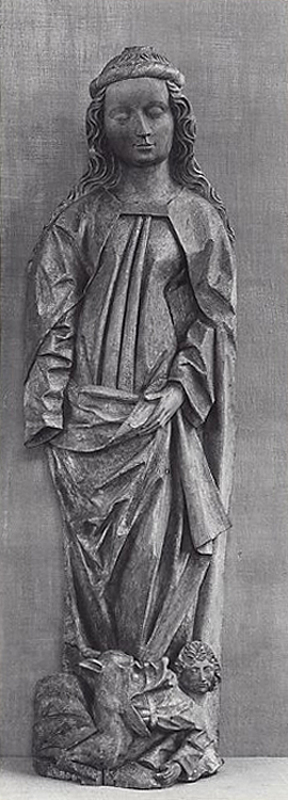
St. Margaret

The set of Six statues from the Church of St. Nicholas in Cheb is one of the finest and oldest works created by the local carving workshop in Cheb in the 1480s-90s. The statues are of similar height and may have been part of one or more Gothic altarpieces. They come from the Chapel of the Holy Cross (1388) in the now vanished village of St. Cross (Heiligenkreutz) between Cheb and Waldsassen, where they were discovered in 1856 by Bernhard Grüber. In the 1860s they were secondarily placed in the Neo-Gothic retables designed by B. Grüber in the Church of St. Nicholas in Cheb.

== Description and classification ==
Statues of lime wood in high relief, hollowed out on the back, with small remnants of the original polychromy. During the restoration, the high layers of modern polychrome were removed and the wood was stripped bare. The slender figures on low semicircular pedestals are distinguished by full modelling of faces and graceful gestures. The faces are dominated by closed and deep-set eyes with distinctive framing, a slender straight nose and full lips. The drapery is sharply cut and the graphic austerity is broken only by the ruffled or folded hems of the cloaks. The figures may have been secondarily cropped on the back in the adaptation to the Neo-Gothic retables.

=== St. Henry ===
Height 126 cm. The crowned Emperor Henry wears a wide-sleeved cloak with a collar that may have originally been polychrome as ermine. The right free leg reveals a raised cloak. The oval face of St. Henry, with a long unbroken beard and curly hair, became the model for other male faces coming from this Cheb workshop (the torso of St. James, the Lamentation of Ostroh). Widely venerated in Bavaria, St. Henry was the last emperor of the Ottonian dynasty (972-1024) and founder of the bishopric of Bamberg. He was declared a saint in 1164 and, together with his wife Cunigunde, canonized in 1200, often appears as patron saint of churches or altar dedications. For this reason, both saints are often depicted holding a model of a church. The couple died without offspring, according to legend, as a result of taking a vow of chastity.

=== St. Cunigunde ===
Height 132 cm. The figure is depicted with her left free leg crossed and in an aces-like bend that balances the bowing of her head. Cunigunde holds a model of a church in her left hand and holds a raised cloak to her face with her left hand in a graceful movement as an expression of grief. Her hair is netted, covered by a drape and double crown. Her dreamy face has closed and deep-set eyes, a slender and straight nose and a fuller mouth with a protruding lower lip. Along with St. Henry, she was undoubtedly part of the same retable.

=== St. Elizabeth of Thuringia ===
Height 123 cm. Elizabeth of Thuringia was the founder of hospitals and the patroness of the poor, so she is depicted with a kneeling supplicant leaning on a crutch, and with bread in her left hand and a teapot in her right. The left hand holds the tip of the cloak, which is turned to the reverse under the right hand, forming a wide bowl-shaped fold. In front of the body, the drapery is cut into sharp broken V-shaped folds. The body of the statue is developed more to the sides. The figure stands upright with the knee and the tip of the left free leg marked. Elizabeth has a headdress with a raised and richly draped veil folded over the top of her head. The saint was the patron saint of the Teutonic Order (Order of Brothers of the German House of Saint Mary in Jerusalem), which had its commandery in Cheb.

=== St. Mary Magdalene ===
Height 128 cm. Mary Magdalene is holding in both hands a jar of ointment with which, according to Matthew's Gospel, she went to anoint the dead body of Jesus. Her graceful posture is accentuated by the crossing of her right free leg over the supporting left leg and the slight inclination of her head towards her left shoulder. A wide-sleeved cloak is draped over her left arm, revealing her undergarment on the left side. As with the other statues, it is turned to the reverse in a wide bowl-like fold at the front and then falls down in sharp broken V-shaped folds. The softly sculpted head of the saint with flowing hair is framed on the right side by a veil that falls loosely from the headdress and winds across the chest to the vessel of ointment.

=== St. Clare (?) ===
Height 126 cm. The sculpture has been identified as St. Clare by her bare feet in sandals, her nun's habit girded with rope, her double veil, her wrapped neck, and the bag-bound book she holds in her right hand. St. Clare's left hand, which is missing, usually holds a monstrance. As with the previous statues, the face is graceful and finely modelled. The drapery follows the same scheme, with a triangular folds in front of the body and an accentuation of the right free and slightly bowed leg.

=== St. Margaret ===
Height 127 cm. Margaret of Antioch is depicted with a dragon devouring a male figure, probably representing her tormentor, the Roman official Olybrius. Her graceful girlish face is framed by her long hair pinned up with a headdress. The undergarment is divided by simple vertical folds, and the cloak, held by the left hand, is draped according to an established pattern. The figure, with its simple, axis-like curve and free left leg, is not entirely balanced in proportion. Vykoukal attributes the lower quality of the workmanship to the work of several carvers of varying skill in one workshop.

=== Details of the sculptures ===
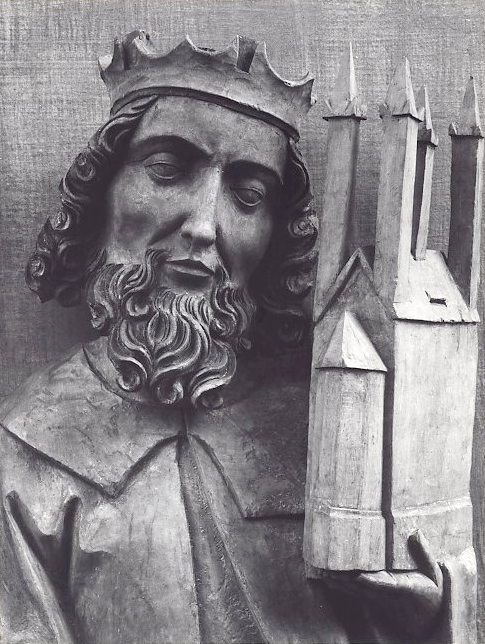
St. Henry

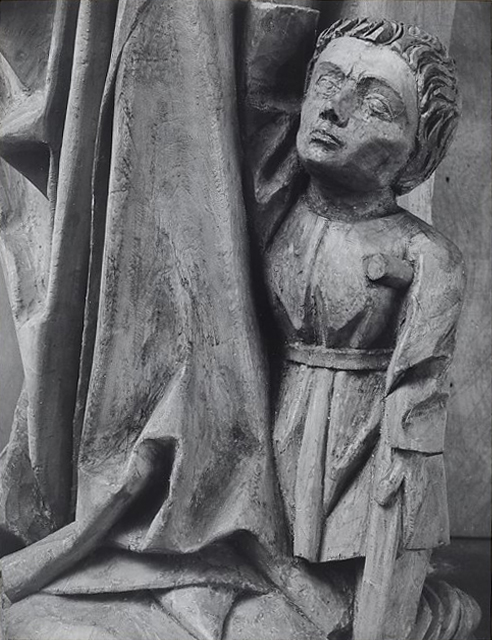
St. Elizabeth of Thuringia

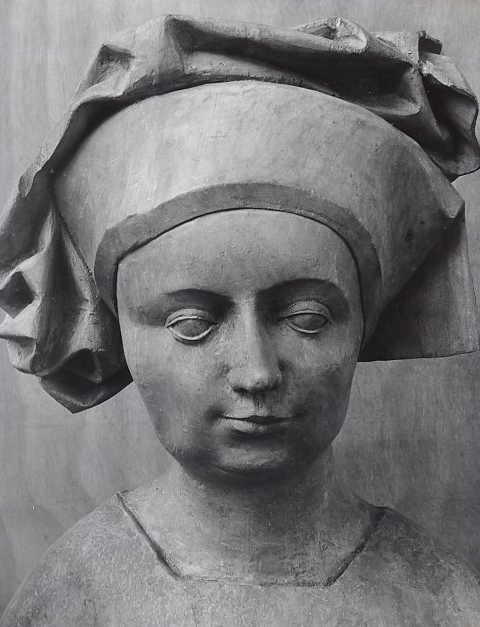
St. Elizabeth of Thuringia

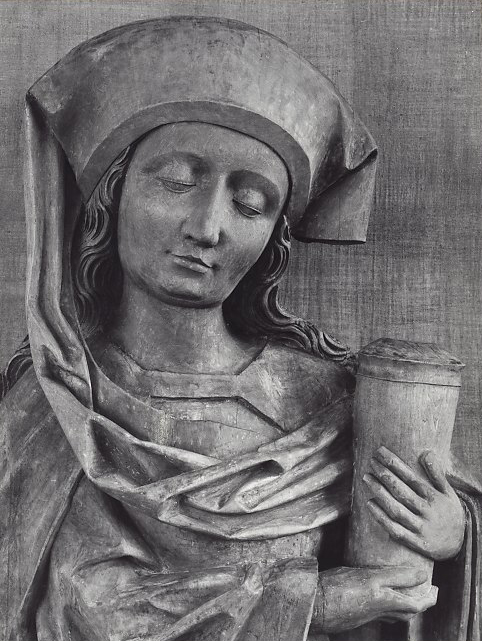
St. Mary Magdalene

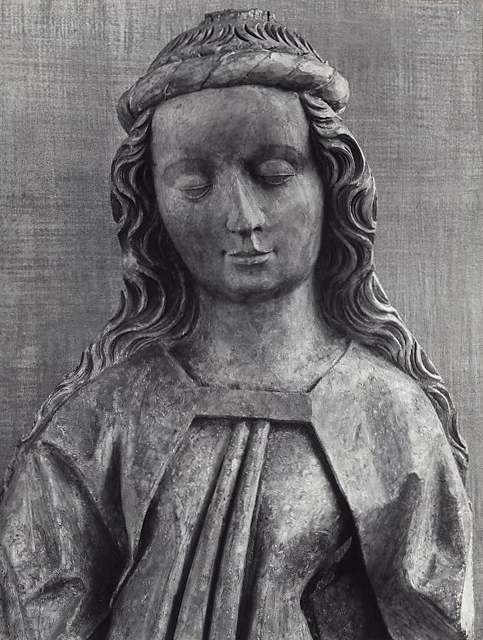
St. Margaret

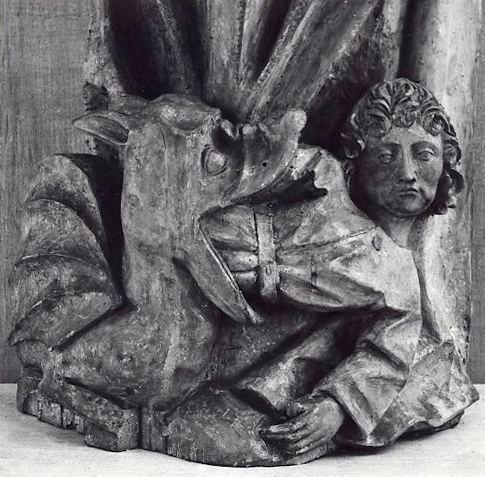
St. Margaret

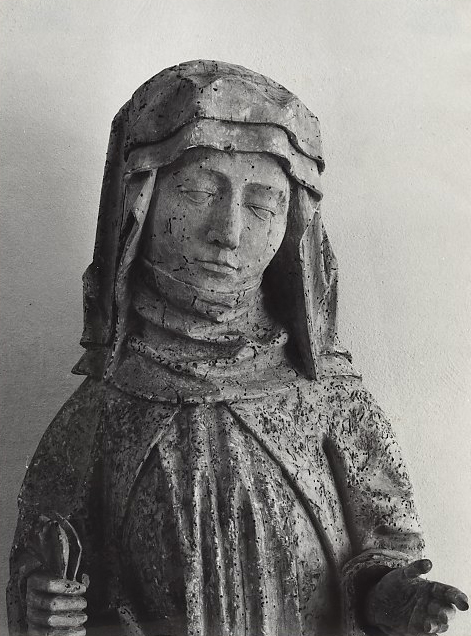
St. Clare

== Cheb carving workshop ==
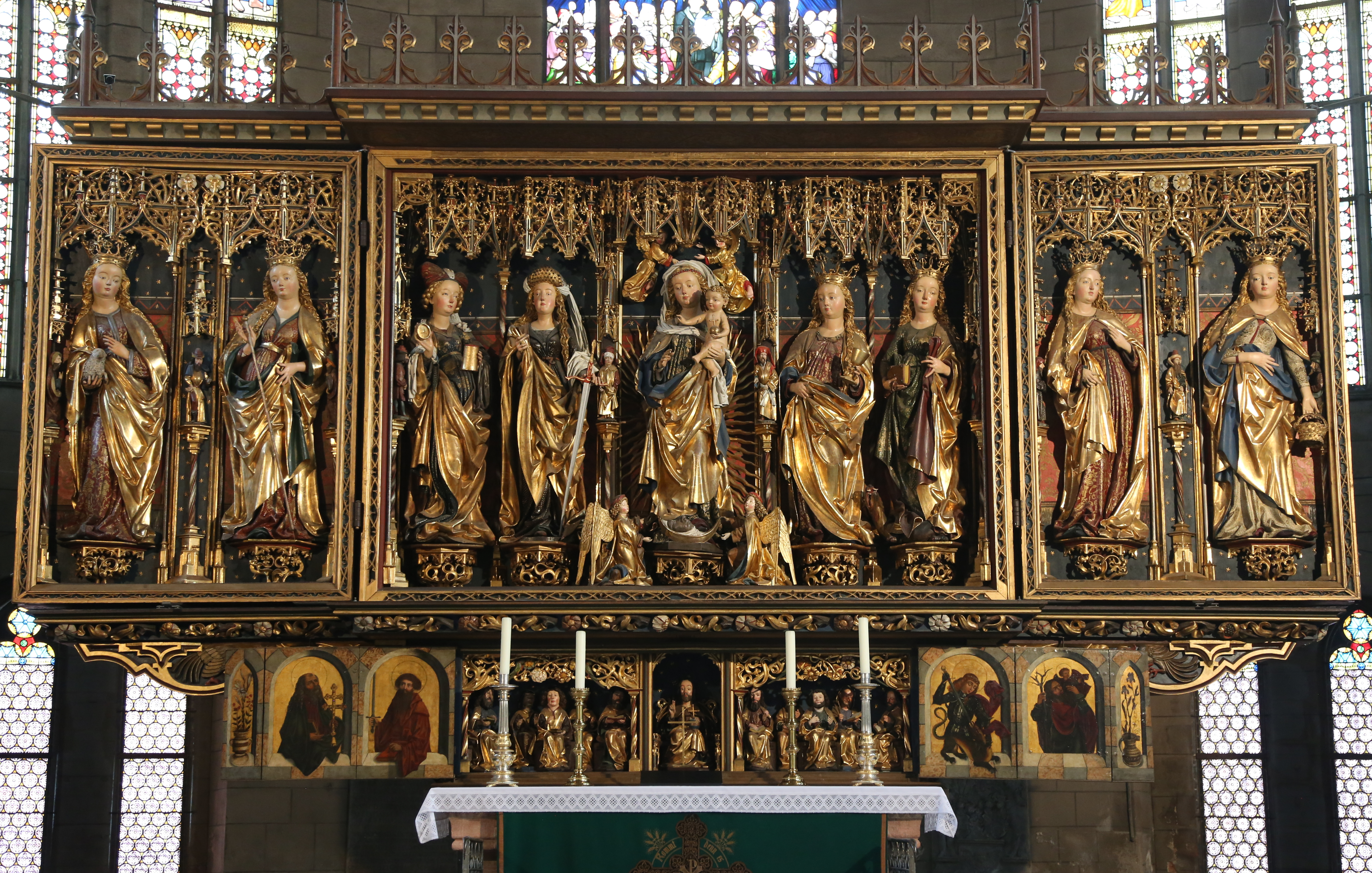
Altar - Zwickau Marienkirche

The continuous activity of the Cheb workshop, where the sculptures were created, is documented from the 1480s to the second decade of the 16th century. The typicality of the female heads and the proximity to high-quality Franconian models link this set of sculptures with the Master of the Madonna of Kamenná Street and the Master of the Lamentation of Seeberg. Vykoukal suggests that the workshop employed sculptors trained in Nuremberg, and that the head carver of the workshop probably went through the workshop of Michael Wolgemut, who supplied the high altar for the Church of Our Lady in Zwickau in 1479.

The set of sculptures from the church of St. Nicholas in Cheb are linked to the Zwickau altar by softly sculpted faces, fashionable female headdresses, the type of cloaks and the depiction of drapery, or the iconographic scheme of the depiction of the saint St. Elizabeth of Thuringia. Elizabeth represents the finest carving of the entire ensemble and has a direct link to the statue of St. Elizabeth at Schwabach, an early work by the Master of the Zwickau altarpiece. The Madonna of Kamenná Street is based on the face of St Margaret and the drapery of St Mary Magdalene. The stylistic orientation to the Zwikov models persisted in Cheb until the second decade of the 16th century, but led to their gradual simplification and rustication (the face of St Henry in the assistant figures of the Lamentation of Seeberg).

However, fully sculptural statues are typical of Nuremberg, where Veit Stoss and Hans Pleydenwurff were active at the same time, and the relief sculptures of Cheb move away from this pattern. Relief sculptures with similar drapery schemes and stylistically older faces were created for the Altar of the Fourteen Holy Helpers in Kadaň by the Cheb sculptor Hans Maler von Eger, who trained in Nuremberg in the 1560s and 1570s before coming to Kadaň. It cannot be ruled out that he returned to Cheb from Kadaň and may be identical to the Master of the Madonna of Kamenná Street, from whose workshop around two dozen works have survived in Cheb.

From the carving workshop in the nearby Hof, which is based on Freiberg´s sculpture in style, a number of retables have survived in the surrounding villages, which show considerable similarities with those of Cheb in the treatment of faces and the scheme of drapery. It is probable that Cheb, as a much more important trade centre, exported the retables directly or that some of the carvers went from there to Hof, where the activity of carving workshops is documented only after 1509. For example, the carver Michael Heuffner (1483, Cheb-1511, Zwickau), who trained under Peter Breuer and was the author of the Marian altar (1511) in the hospital church in Hof, came from Cheb.

=== Related works ===
- Torso of the Saint (St. James ?), GVU Cheb
- The Lamentation of Seeberg (Ostroh)

== Sources ==
- Jiří Vykoukal (ed.), Gothic Art in the Cheb Region, Gallery of Fine Arts in Cheb 2009, ISBN 978-80-85016-92-5
- Marion Tietz-Strödel, Die Plastik in Eger von den frühen Gotik bis zur Renaissance, in. Stadt und Land, Wien, München 1992, pp. 277-278
- Jana Ševčíková, Cheb Gothic Sculpture, Gallery of Fine Arts in Cheb 1975
- Bernhard Grüber, Die Kaiserburg zu Eger und die an dieses Bauwerk sich anschliessenden Denkmale, Prag / Leipzig 1864
