= Jan Polack =

Polish painter

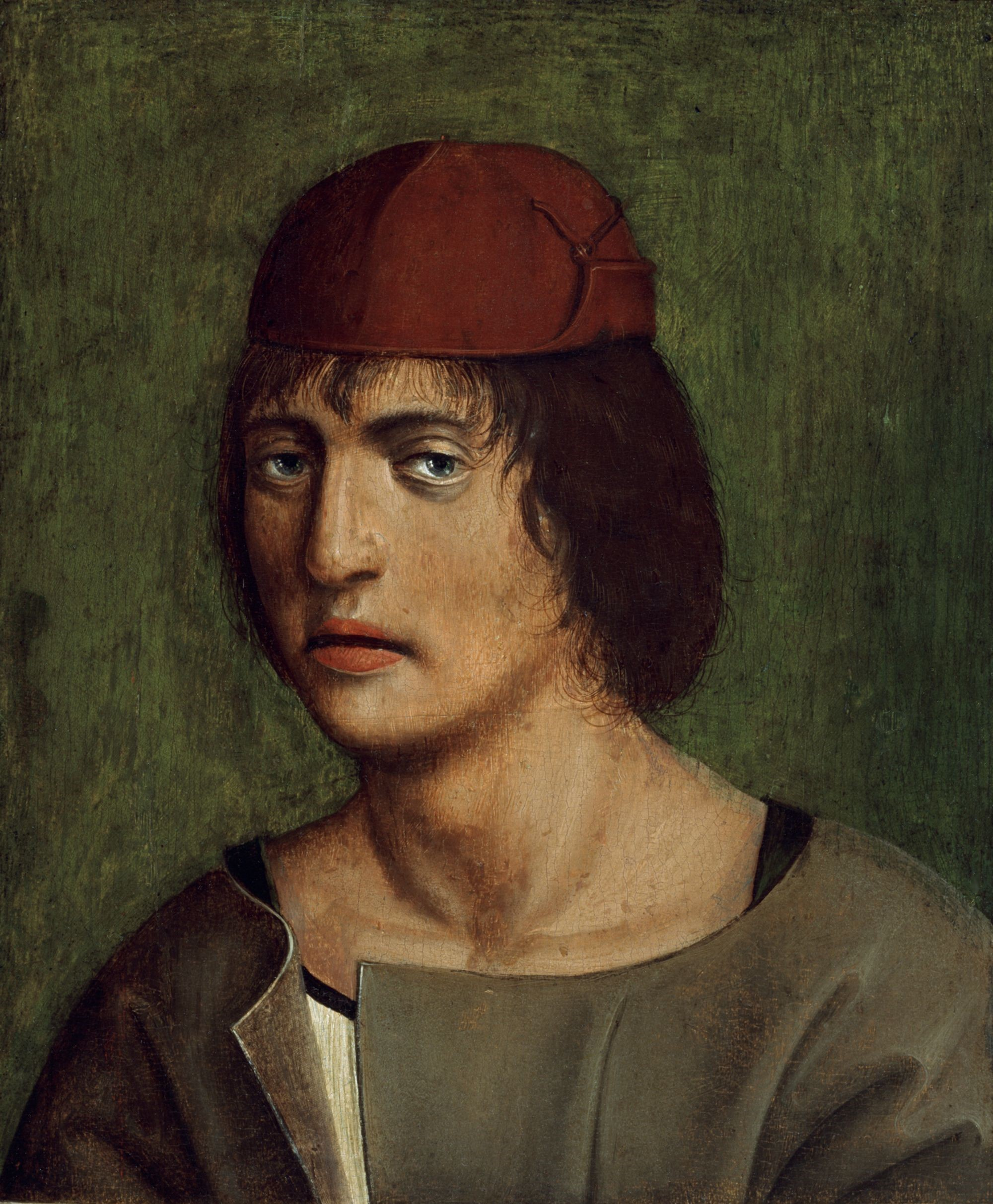
- Born: c. 1435; Possibly Kraków, Crown of the Kingdom of Poland
- Died: 1519; Munich, Duchy of Bavaria, Holy Roman Empire
- Known for: Painting
- Patrons: City of Munich

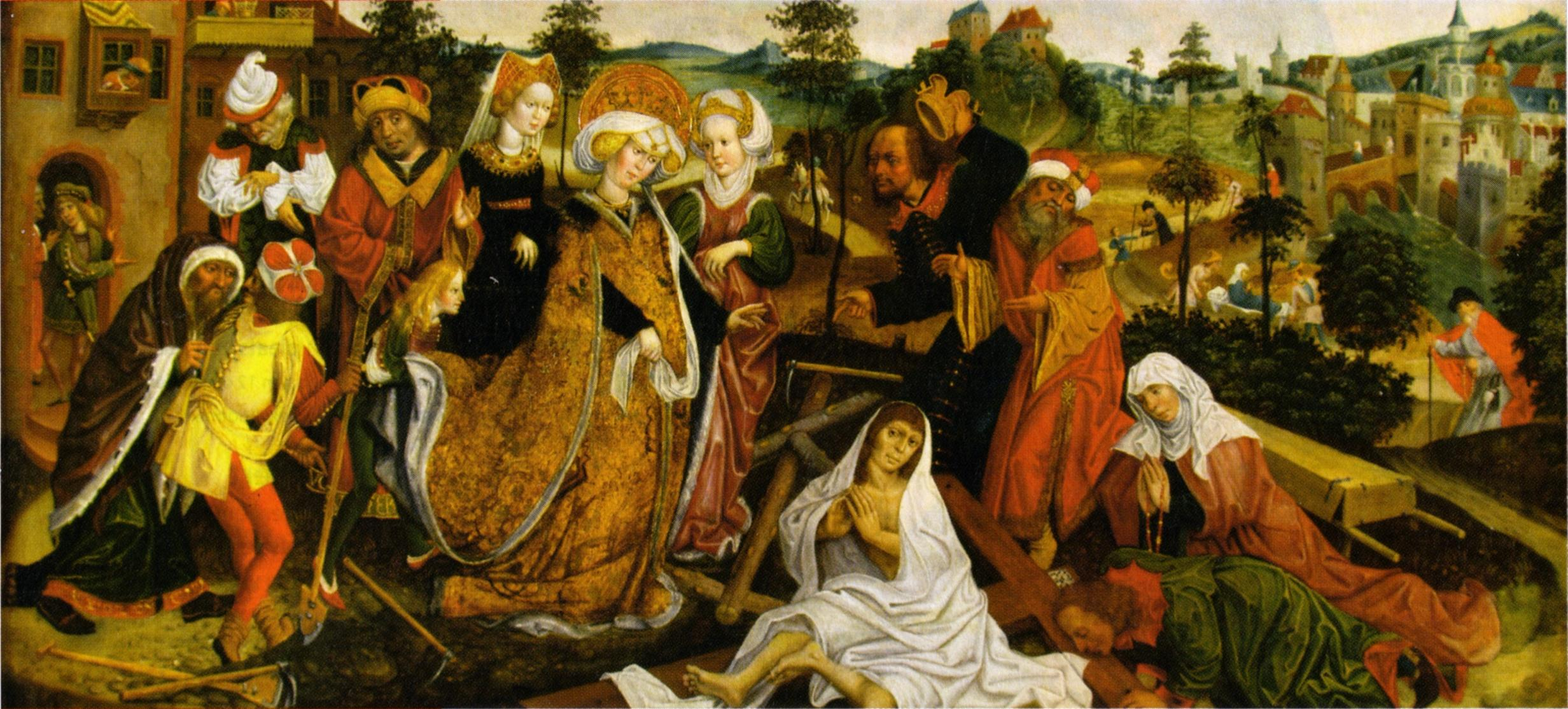
Jan Polack, The Recognition of the True Cross (Legend of St. Helena), panel, 46.5 × 101.6 cm, 1486. Huis Bergh collection

Jan Polack (Latin: Ioannes Polonus, also spelled Hanns Polagk, Polegk; born 1435/1450 – 1519) was a 15th-century painter.

From his nickname it is assumed that he might have been born and/or worked in Kraków, Poland. From the mid-1470s on, he lived and worked in Munich, having previously been in Franconia. He may have taken part in the 1475 festival of the Landshut Wedding of Jadwiga Jagiellon and George of Bavaria. In 1480, he opened his own shop in Munich, where he remained until his death.

Starting in 1482, he is listed on the tax records of Munich, also as leader of the local painter guild. He visited with Michael Wohlgemuth and his art was influenced by him and by that of Veit Stoss and Hans Pleydenwurff as well as by collaboration with the woodcutter Erasmus Grasser.

Documents mention many works of his which are now lost. His most important remaining work is the Weihenstephan altarpiece (1483–1485), now at the Alte Pinakothek in Munich.

== Gallery ==
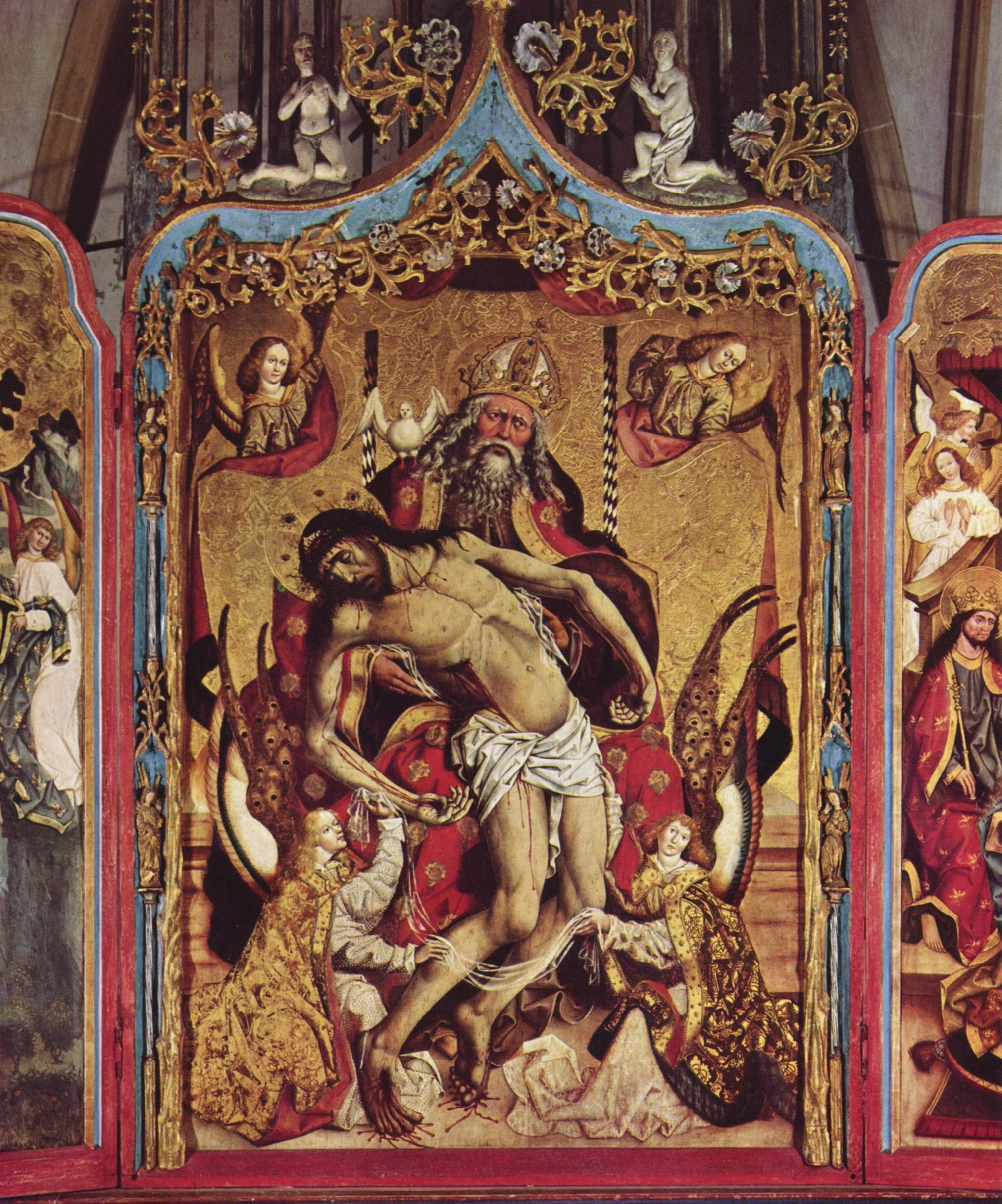
Gnadenstuhl as God Father, Son and Holy Ghost, 1491

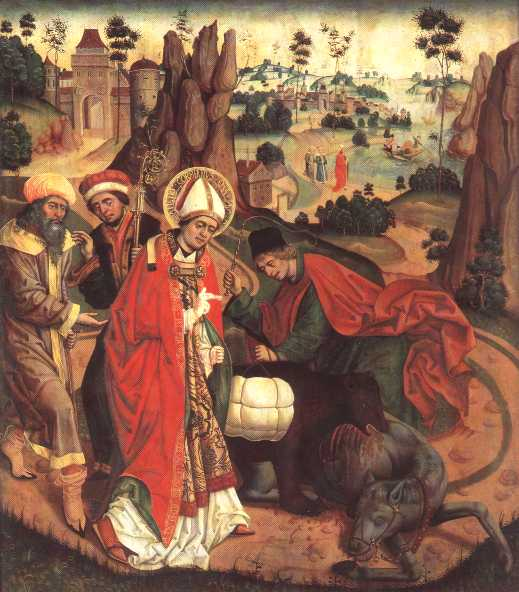
The Miracle of the Bear, 1489
