= Master of the Madonna of Kamenná Street =

The Master of the Madonna of Kamenná Street is an auxiliary term for an anonymous carver active in Cheb between 1480 and 1520. Around twenty late Gothic carvings are associated with his workshop in the Cheb region. According to Vykoukal, he could be identical to the Cheb sculptor Hans Maler von Eger.

== Work ==
Ševčíková introduced the designation after the sculpture of Assumpta with the Baby Jesus from Kamenná Street, which she considers to be the central work for the classification of Cheb carving production at the turn of the 15th century. The origin of the Cheb carving workshops was connected with the construction of the St. Nicholas Church, rebuilt in the Gothic style in 1456–1476. The surviving inventories of the church from 1464 to 1474 confirm the existence of eleven altars of various dedications, commissioned by local patrician families. Vykoukal places a fine set of statues from the Church of St. Nicholas in Cheb within the workshop circle of this Master.

The master of the Madonna of Kamenná Street benefits indirectly from the Upper Rhine carving, influenced by the local more conservative tradition (e.g. the motif of the upright and clothed Jesus). The sense of a fuller and more sculptural form and a more pronounced volume suggests that he was familiar with Franconian sculpture (Altar with the Engagement of St. Catherine, Germanisches Nationalmuseum, Nuremberg, Madonna of Trautskirchen).

Vykoukal presumes that his workshop employed sculptors trained in Nuremberg, and the head carver of the workshop probably came from Michael Wolgemut's workshop. Swabian inspiration, represented by the late works of Hans Multscher, was also integrated into the Nuremberg tradition. The softly sculpted faces, fashionable female headdresses, the type of cloaks and the rendering of drapery or iconographic scheme link the St. Nicholas sculptures with Michael Wolgemut's Altarpiece of Zwickau (1479). Other surviving works, however, have only simplified and rusticated this pattern. Established medieval workshop practice and working according to established patterns does not even allow the individual contribution of individual carvers to be determined. Vykoukal also questions the meaningfulness of identifying the carver by the Madonna of Kamenná Street, which is not one of the finest works in his supposed body of work.

According to Ševčíková, some of the works of the Master of the Madonna of Kamenná Street are characterised by a more naive and decorative manner of processing and a rather formal solution to artistic problems. The diminution of large form and the pursuit of precise rendering leads, in works of lower quality, to the expression becoming an empty and smiling mask.

Set of six sculptures from the Church of St. Nicholas in Cheb (1580s-90s)

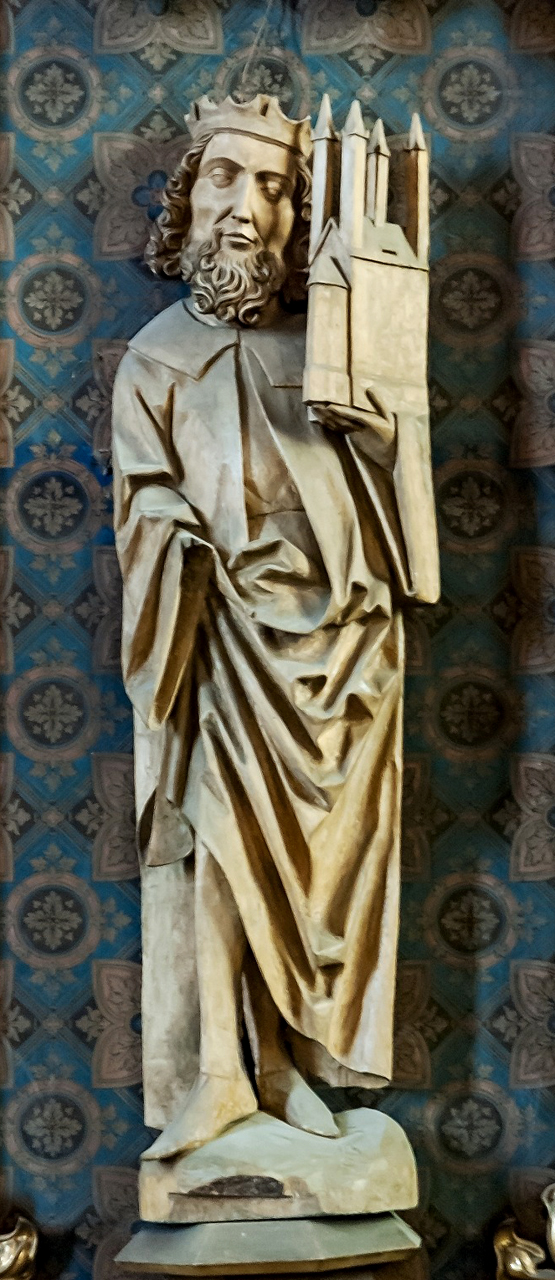
St. Henry

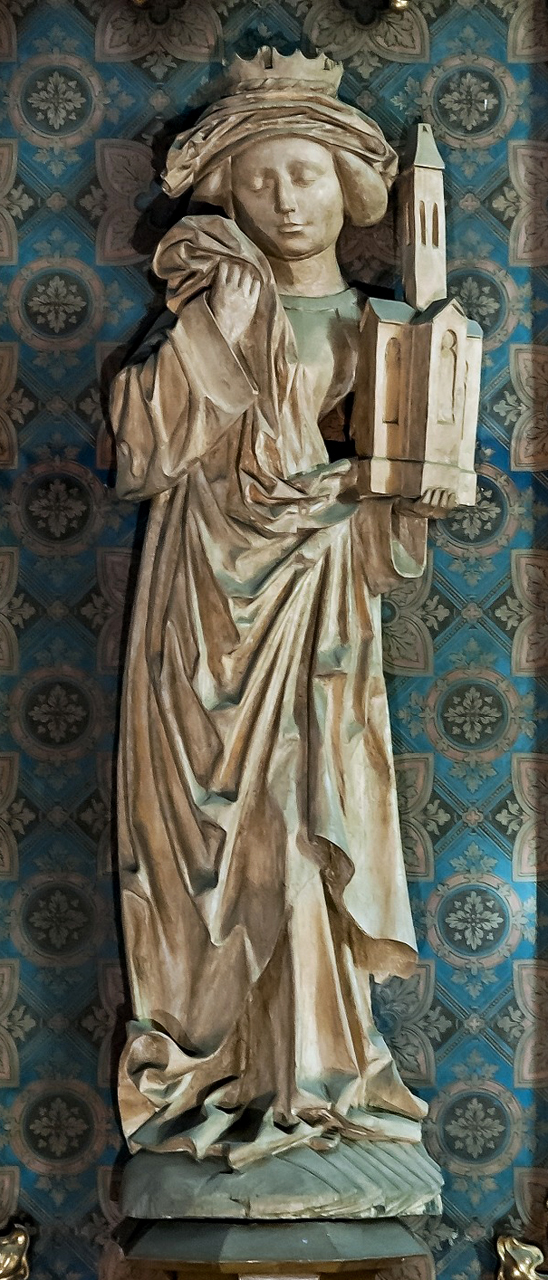
St. Kunhuta

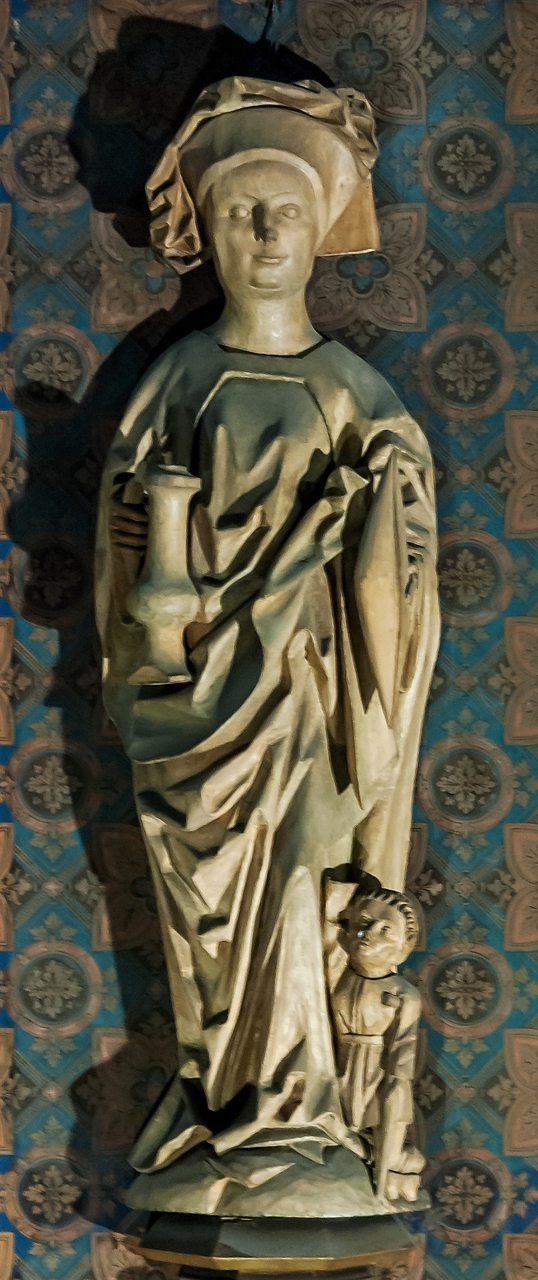
St. Elizabeth of Thuringia

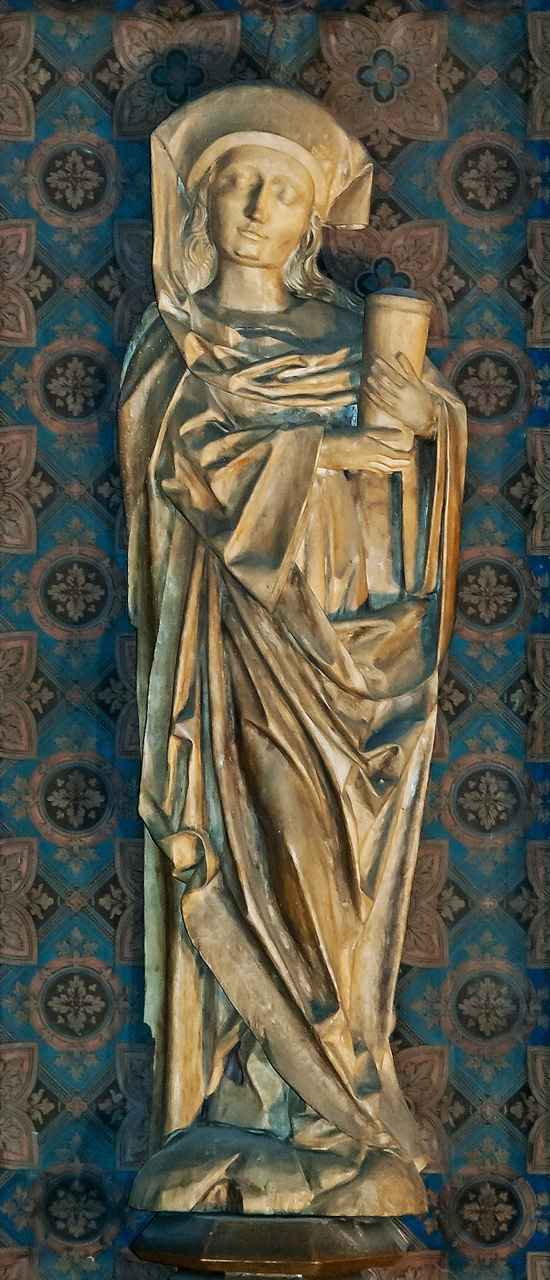
St. Mary Magdalene

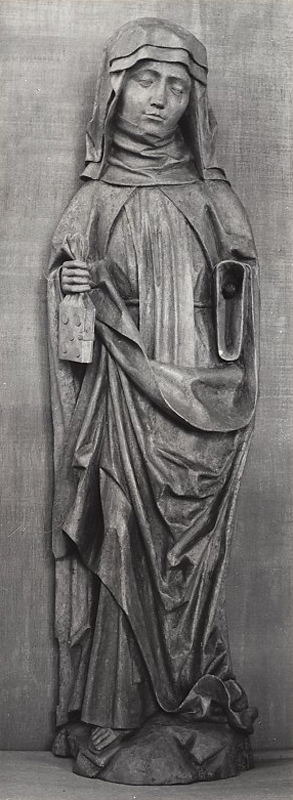
St. Clare

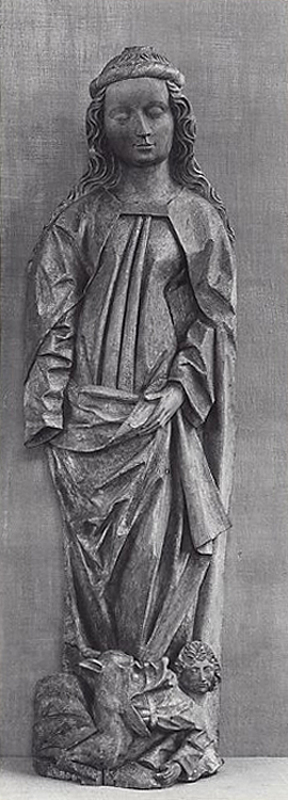
St. Margaret

=== Notable works ===
- Set of Six statues from the Church of St. Nicholas in Cheb (1580s-90s)
- Female saint of Teplá (around 1500)
- Assumpta with the Baby Jesus from Kamenná Street (end of the 15th century)
- St. John the Evangelist from the group under the Cross, Cheb Museum
- Altar wings with St. Barbara and St. Apolena of Planá, Tachov Museum
- Resting Christ of Seeberg (around 1509)
- Resting Christ from Aš
- St. Sebastian of Cheb, Cheb Museum
- Resting Christ from the Church of St. Wenceslas in Cheb
- Resting Christ from Horní Lomany
- St. Lawrence and St. Stephen from the dean's office in Cheb
- Assumpta with Baby Jesus from the Church of St. Judoc in Cheb - workshop circuit
- St. Sebastian (GVU Cheb) and St. Catherine (missing) from Vysoká
- Crucifixion with Our Lady of Sorrows and John the Evangelist from Vysoká (missing)
- Assumpta with Baby Jesus from Arzberg - workshop circuit
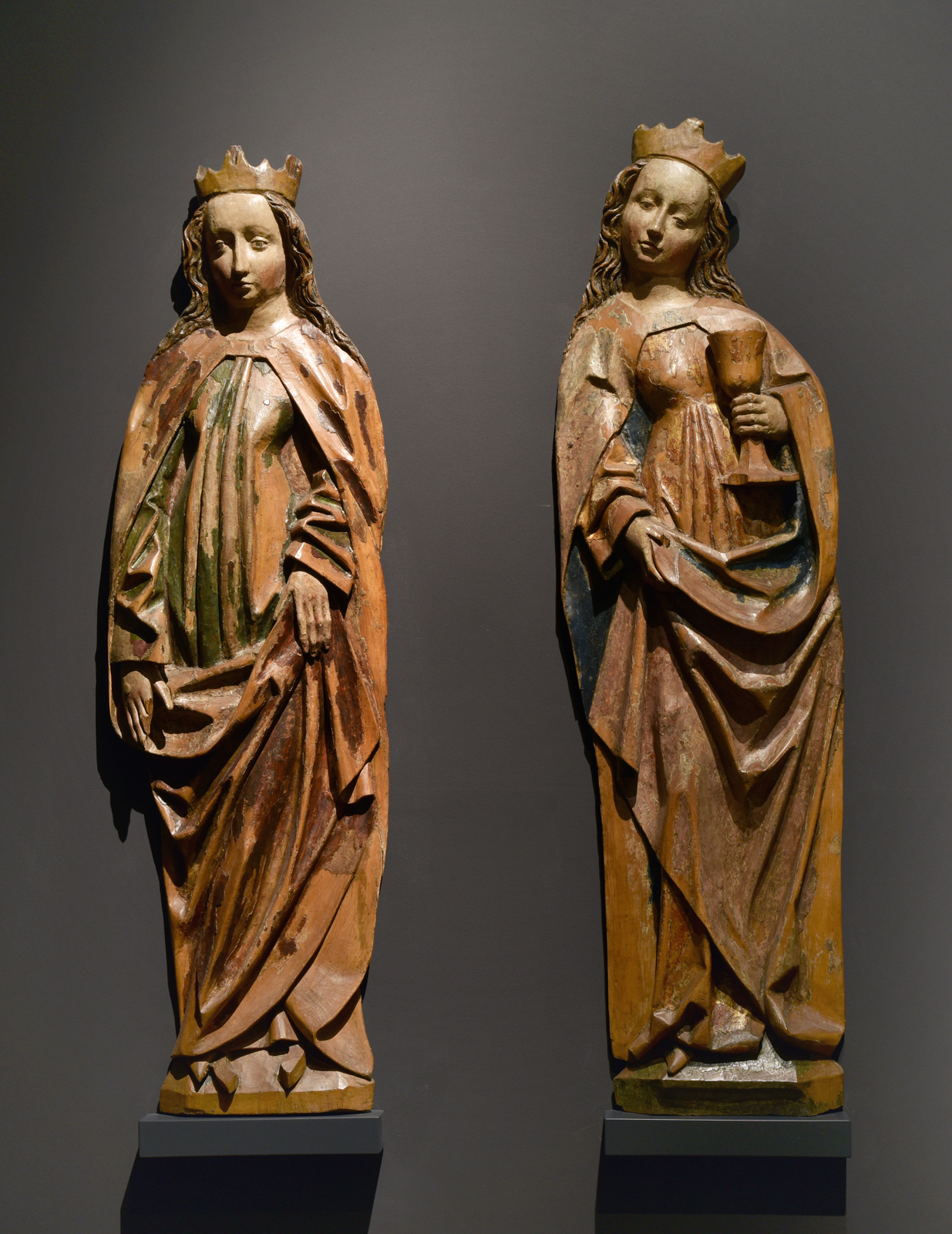
St. Catherine and St. Barbara of Teplá, Gallery of Fine Arts in Cheb

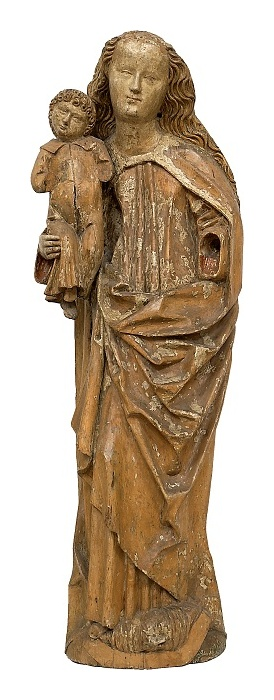
Assumpta with Baby Jesus from the Church of St. Judoc in Cheb, Cheb Museum

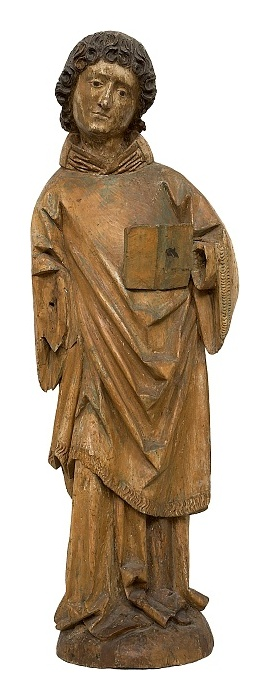
St. Lawrence from the dean's office in Cheb

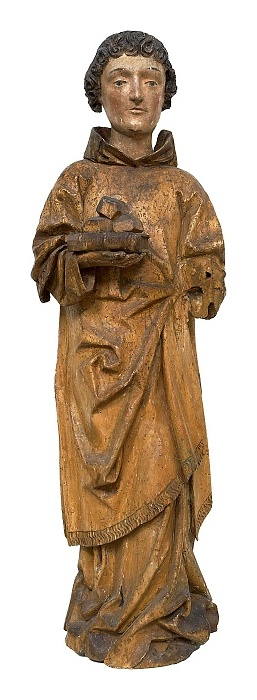
St. Stephen from the dean's office in Cheb

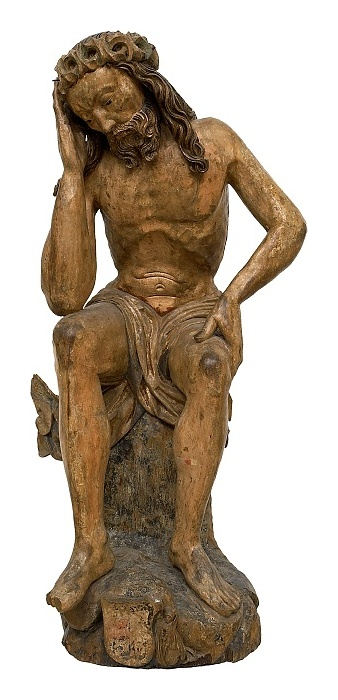
Resting Christ from Seeberg

== Sources ==
- Jiří Vykoukal (ed.), Gothic Art in the Cheb Region, Gallery of Fine Arts in Cheb 2009, ISBN 978-80-85016-92-5
- Marion Tietz-Strödel, Die Plastik in Eger von den frühen Gotik bis zur Renaissance, in. Stadt und Land, Wien, München 1992, pp. 277–278
- Jana Ševčíková, Cheb Gothic Sculpture, Gallery of Fine Arts in Cheb 1975
