= Assumpta with the Baby Jesus from Kamenná Street =

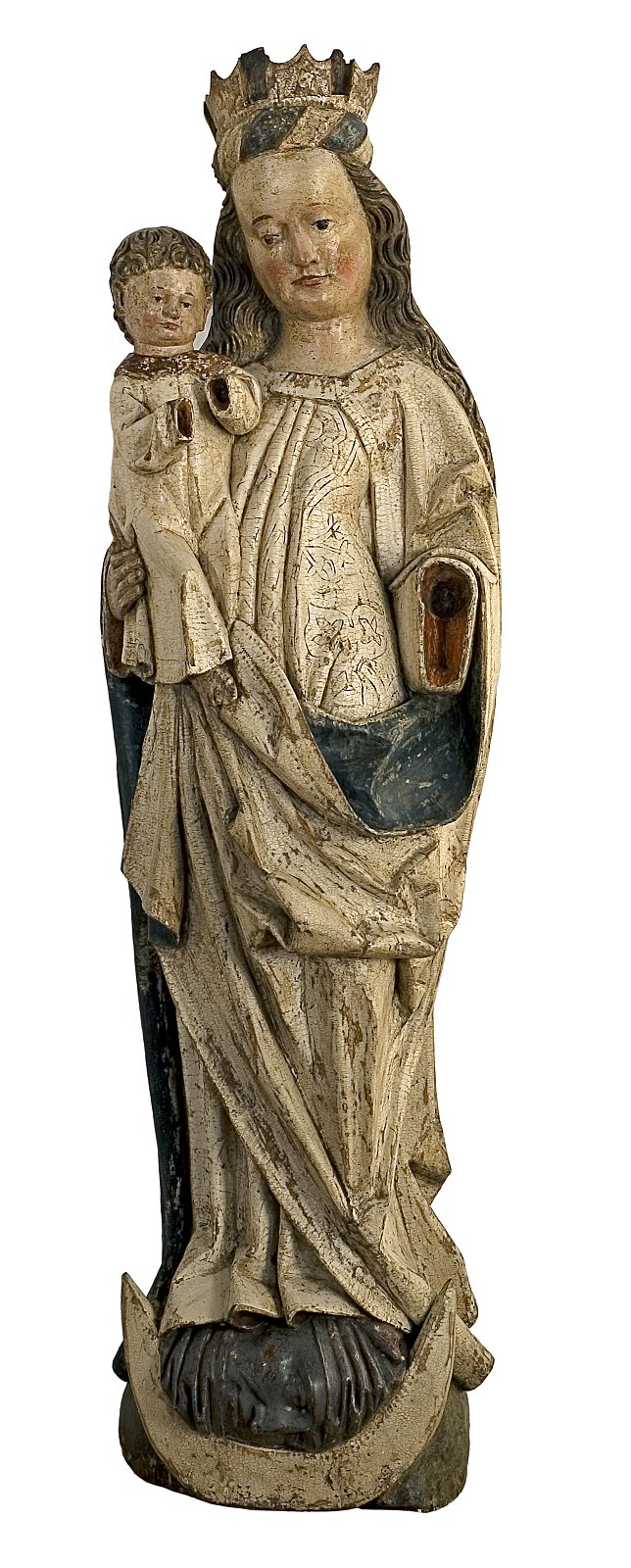
Assumpta with the Baby Jesus from Kamenná Street (end of the 15th century)

The Assumpta with the Baby Jesus from Kamenná Street (end of the 15th century) is a late Gothic sculpture that became the central work for the definition of Cheb carving production at the turn of the 15th century. A number of other sculptural works are attributed to the anonymous artist known as the Master of the Madonna of Kamenná Street in the Cheb region.

The statue has a rarely preserved polychrome and engraved decoration on the undergown. It is exhibited in the exposition of Cheb Gothic at the Gallery of Fine Arts in Cheb.

== Description and classification ==
Free standing wooden statue 139 × 41 × 34 cm, hollowed out at the back, with original incarnatus and chalk base with engraved ornaments. The left hand of the Virgin Mary and both hands of the baby Jesus from the wrist are missing. Restored by J. Tesař (1971) and E. Kolmanová (1989).

The slender figure of the crowned Virgin Mary stands on a lunar mask with a human face, which covers most of the base. This type of representation of the Madonna (Assumpta) originated with the isolation of the figure from the Assumption scene in early 14th century Italy. It was very common in Bohemia from the second half of the 14th century until the Reformation.

Mary's undergown has a preserved chalk ground with an engraved decoration of lily trefoils. The longitudinal folds of the drapery accentuate the arching of the figure's back and the extension of the right hip. The tip of the left free leg is extended, the left knee protrudes above the triangular fold of the robe. In front of Mary's body, the cloak is trapped beneath the figure of the Christ Child and finished with a simple tubular fold. Under the left arm, it is turned to the reverse and forms a deeper bowl-shaped fold that continues downward with several folds, and is cut from the right side by long diagonal folds with raised edges that fall to the side of the base. Mary has a girlish face with a broad forehead and almond-shaped eyes with pulled up lid margins. Baby Jesus, who is almost standing on Mary's side, is dressed in a long shirt with an angular collar. This type of depiction dates back to pre-Hussite times and is unusual in the late 15th century. The gestures of Jesus' hands are not obvious - he may have been holding an apple or giving a blessing.

Ševčíková assumes that the Master of the Madonna of Kamenná Street was inspired by Swabian sculpture, but the sense of fuller and more elongated volume of the sculptures means that he was also familiar with Franconian sculpture. She cites the altarpiece with the Engagement of St Catherine (Germanisches Nationalmuseum, Nuremberg) or the Madonna from the altarpiece in Trautskirchen as possible sources of inspiration. St. Lawrence and St. Stephen from the dean's office in Cheb find counterparts in the so-called Kottingwörth altarpiece of the episcopal house chapel in Eichstätt.

=== Related works ===
- A set of six statues from the Church of St. Nicholas in Cheb
- St. Catherine and St. Barbara of Teplá, Gallery of Fine Arts in Cheb
- Assumpta with Baby Jesus from the Church of St. Judoc in Cheb, Cheb Museum
- Altar wings with St. Barbara and Apolena from Planá, Tachov Museum
- St. Lawrence and St. Stephen from the dean's office in Cheb
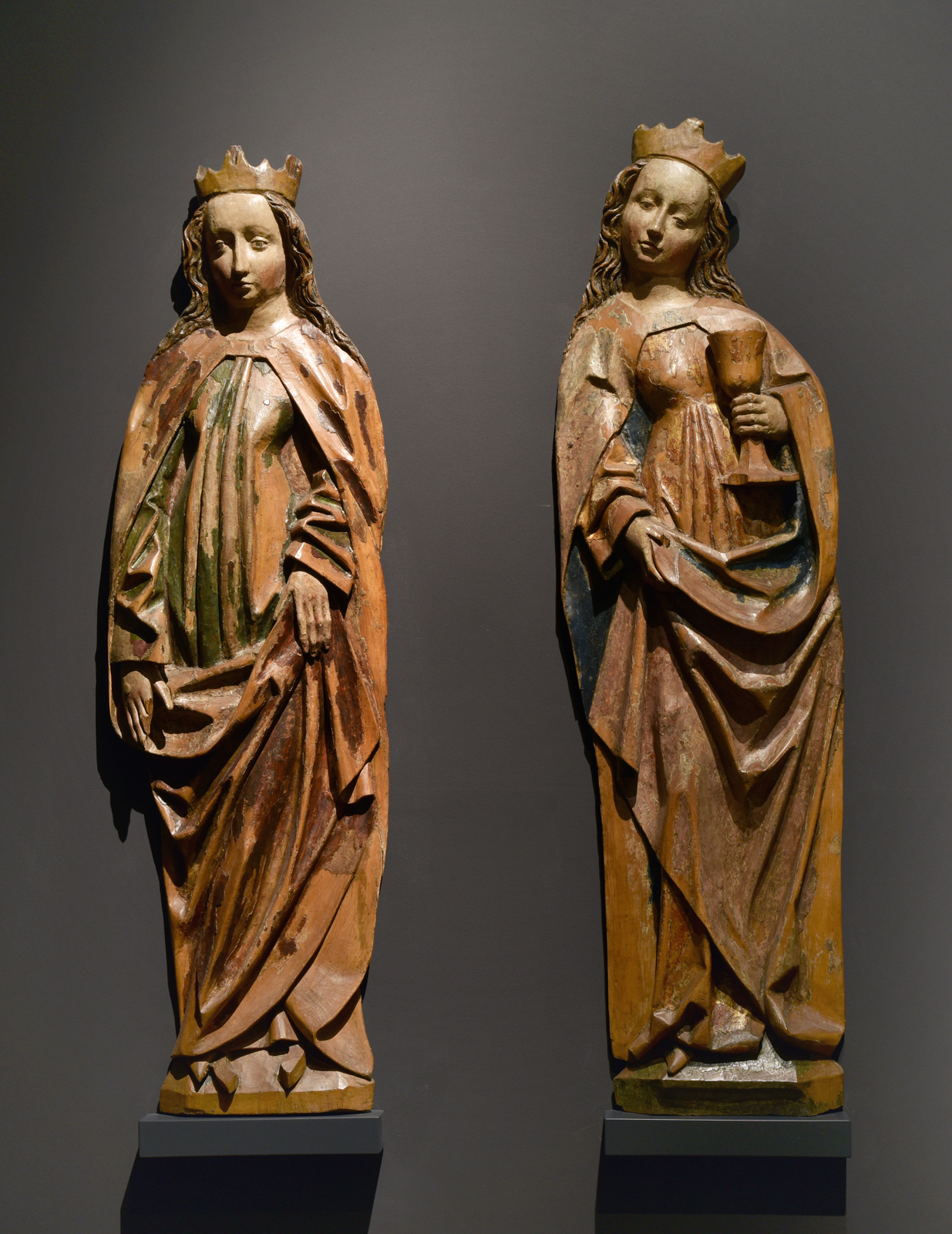
St. Catherine and St. Barbara of Teplá, Gallery of Fine Arts in Cheb

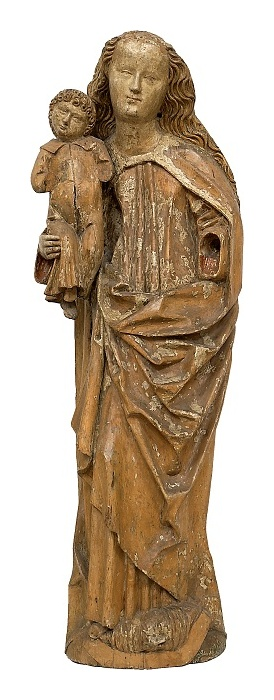
Assumpta with Baby Jesus from the Church of St. Judoc in Cheb, Cheb Museum

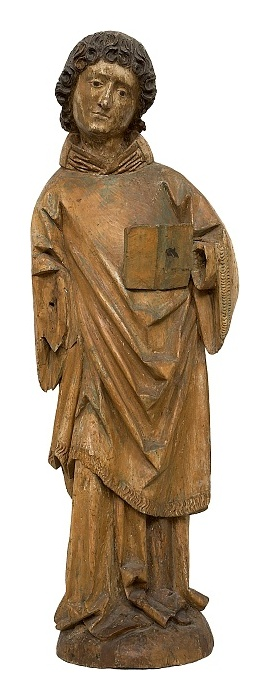
St. Lawrwnce from the dean's office in Cheb

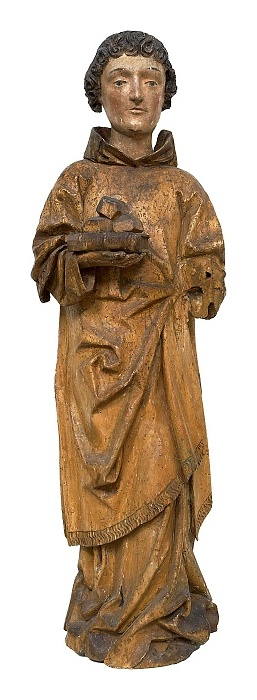
St. Stephen from the dean's office in Cheb

== Sources ==
- Jiří Vykoukal (ed.), Gothic Art in the Cheb Region, Gallery of Fine Arts in Cheb 2009, ISBN 978-80-85016-92-5
- Marion Tietz-Strödel, Die Plastik in Eger von den frühen Gotik bis zur Renaissance, in. Stadt und Land, Wien, München 1992, pp. 277-278
- Jana Ševčíková, Cheb Gothic Sculpture, Gallery of Fine Arts in Cheb 1975
