= Hans Pleydenwurff =

German painter

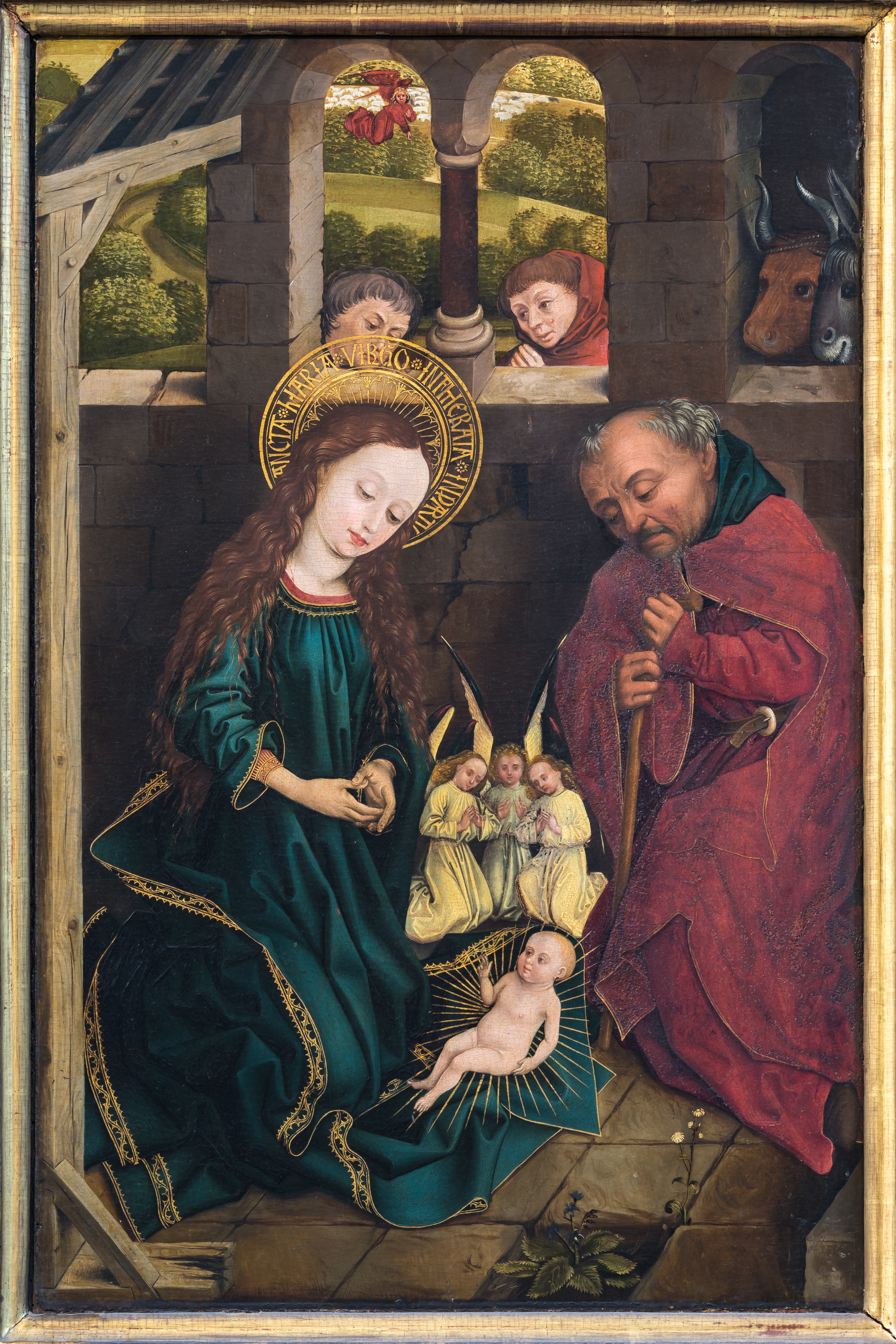
Detail Altar of the Magi

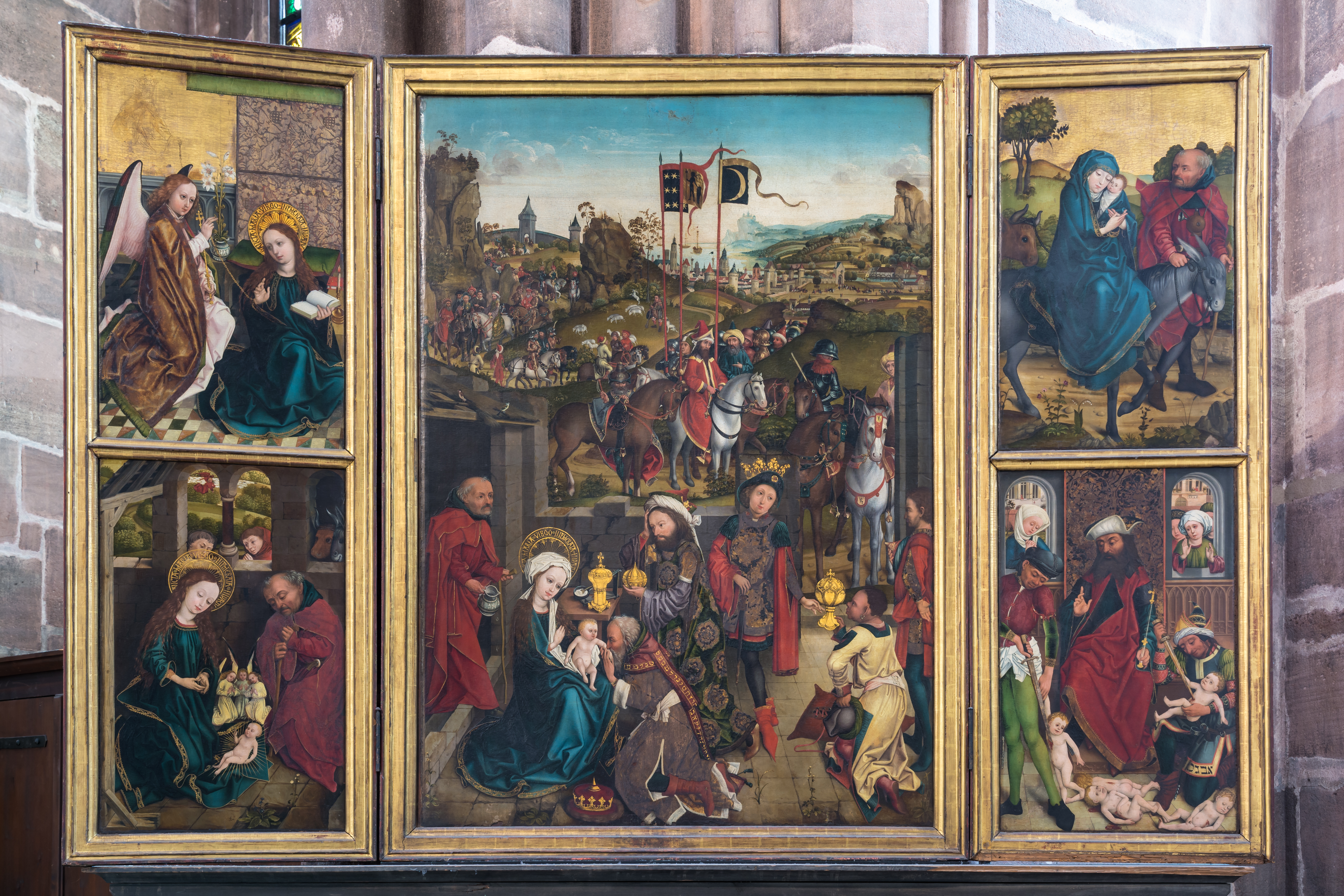
Dreikönigsaltar 1460-1465

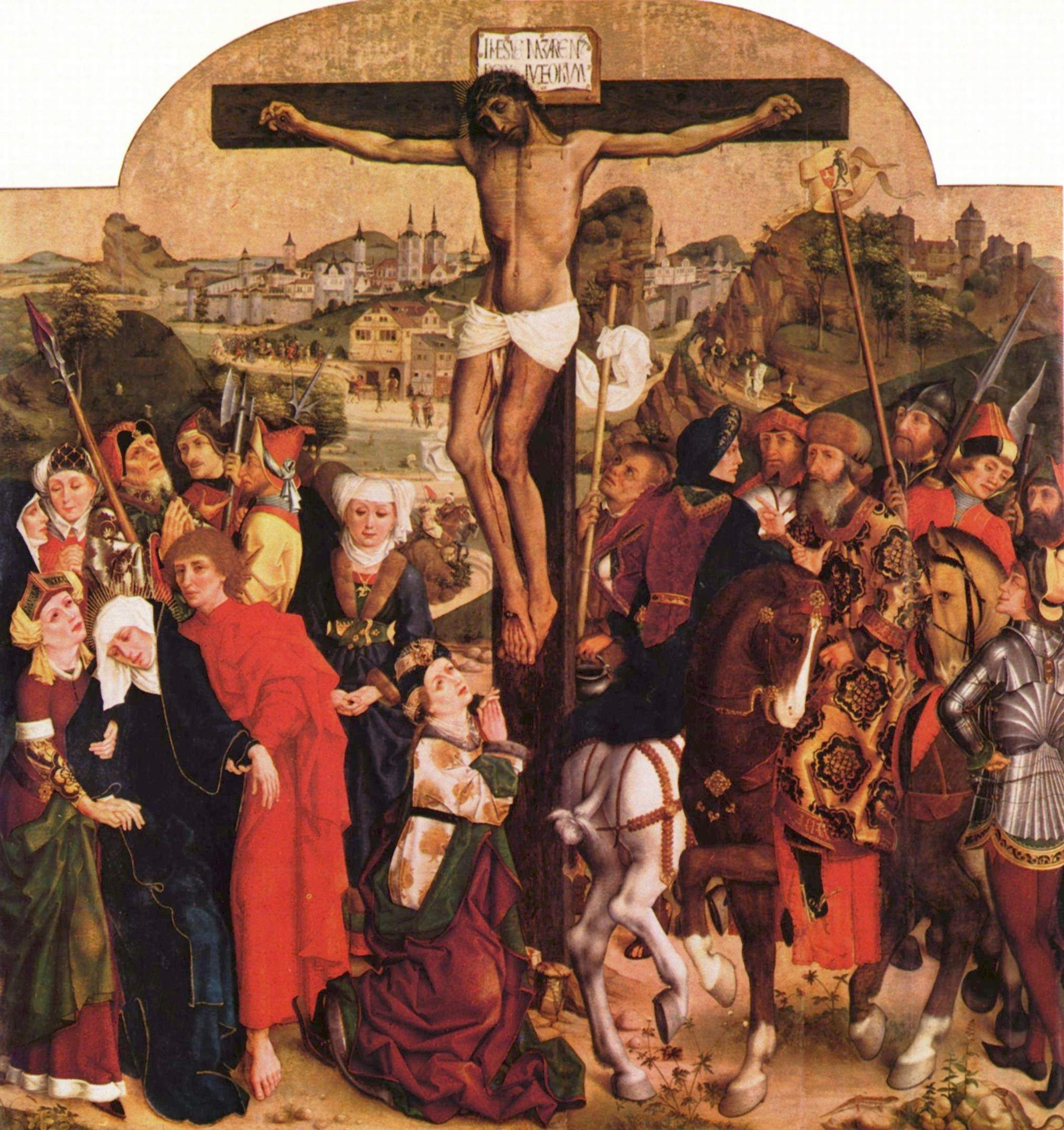
Crucifixion of Christ

Hans Pleydenwurff (also Pleidenwurff; c. 1420 – 9 January 1472) was a German painter.

His father was probably Kunz Pleydenwurff, a well-respected painter and part-time mayor in Bamberg. Since 1457, Hans lived in Nuremberg where he established a new style of realism, influenced by Northern Renaissance painters. He probably was a teacher of Michael Wolgemut.

His son Wilhelm Pleydenwurff, born in 1460, operated with Michael Wolgemut for the woodcuts of Hartmann Schedel's Nuremberg Chronicle. Another son, Sebald, settled in Eisleben, his profession is unknown. Hans died at Nuremberg in 1472.

== Selected works ==
- Christ as Man of Sorrows, Kunstmuseum, Basel, Switzerland
- Altarpiece, St. Elisabeth in Breslau (1462, currently at Germanisches Nationalmuseum, Nuremberg)
- Portrait of Georg Graf Löwenstein, canon at Bamberg (Germanisches Nationalmuseum)
- Kalvarienberg of Georg Graf Löwenstein, canon at Bamberg (Germanisches Nationalmuseum)
- High Altar, Klarissenkirche in Bamberg (Staatsgalerie Bamberg)
- High Altar, 1465 for St. Michaelis in Hof, since 1811 in Alte Pinakothek, Munich
- Crucifixion, 1470, Alte Pinakothek, Munich
