= Michael Wolgemut =

15th to 16th-century German painter and printmaker

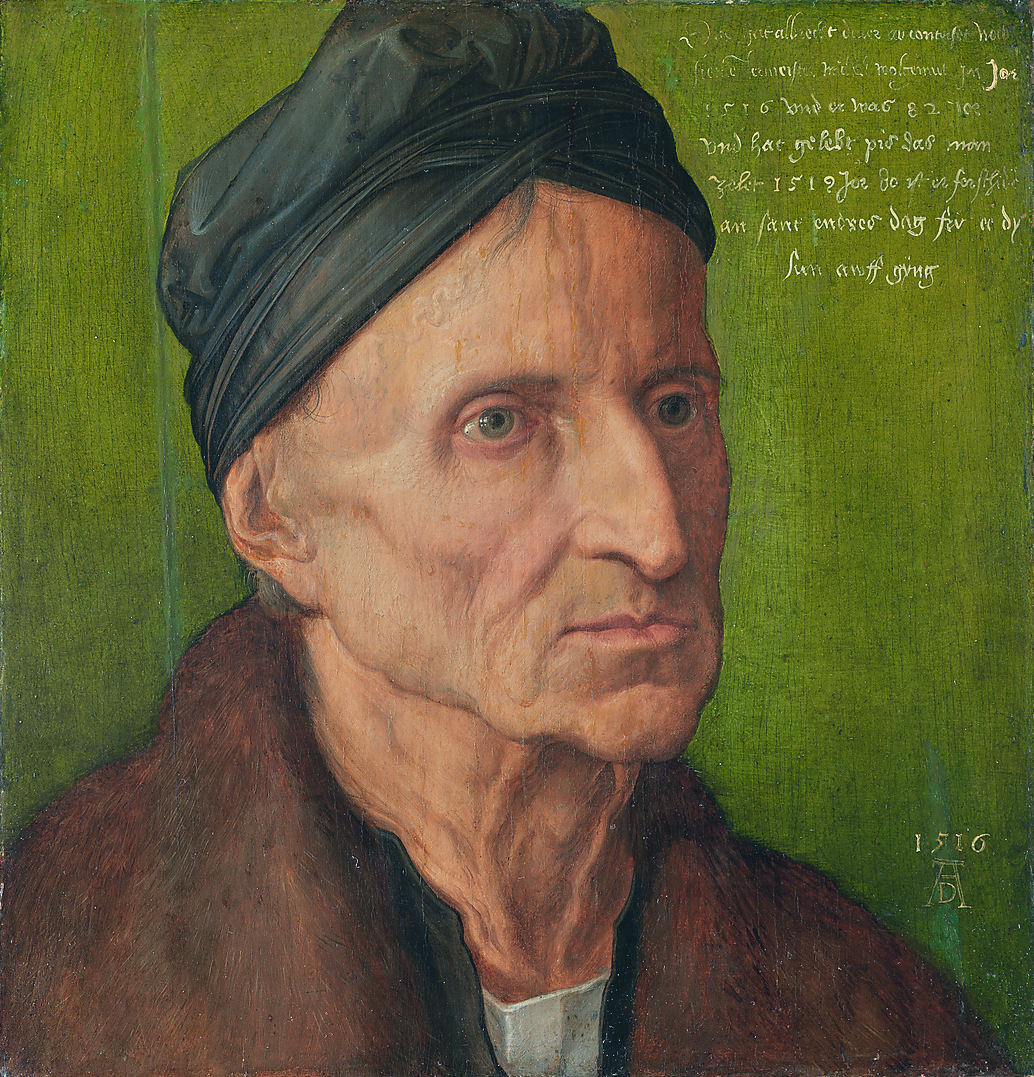
- Portrait of Michael Wolgemut by Albrecht Dürer, circa 1516.
- Born: 1434; Nuremberg, Holy Roman Empire
- Died: 30 November 1519 (aged 85)
- Resting place: Nuremberg
- Occupations: Painter and printmaker.
- Spouse: Hans Pleydenwurff's widow
- Children: Wilhelm Pleydenwurff

Michael Wolgemut (formerly spelt Wohlgemuth; 1434 – 30 November 1519) was a German painter and printmaker who ran a workshop in Nuremberg. He is best known as having taught the young Albrecht Dürer.

The importance of Wolgemut as an artist rests not only on his own individual works, but also on the fact that he was the head of a large workshop, in which many different branches of the fine arts were carried on by a great number of pupil-assistants, including Albrecht Dürer, who completed an apprenticeship with him between 1486 and 1489. In his atelier large altar-pieces and other sacred paintings were executed, and also elaborate carved painted wood retables, consisting of crowded subjects in high relief, richly decorated with gold and colour.

Wolgemut was a leader among the artists reviving the standards of German woodcut at this time. The production of woodcuts was a large part of the work of the workshop, the blocks being cut from Wolgemut's designs. They were mostly made to supply the many publishers in Nuremberg with book illustrations, with the most attractive also being sold separately. Wolgemut's woodcuts followed the advances in engraving, depicting volume and shading to a much greater extent than before. Many are remarkable for their vigour and clever adaptation to the special necessities of the technique of woodcut. Nonetheless, they were very often hand-coloured before or after sale. His pupil Dürer was to build on and to so surpass his achievement that it is often overlooked.

Wolgemut's paintings show Flemish influence, and he may have traveled within Flanders (modern Belgium and surrounding areas).

== Biography ==
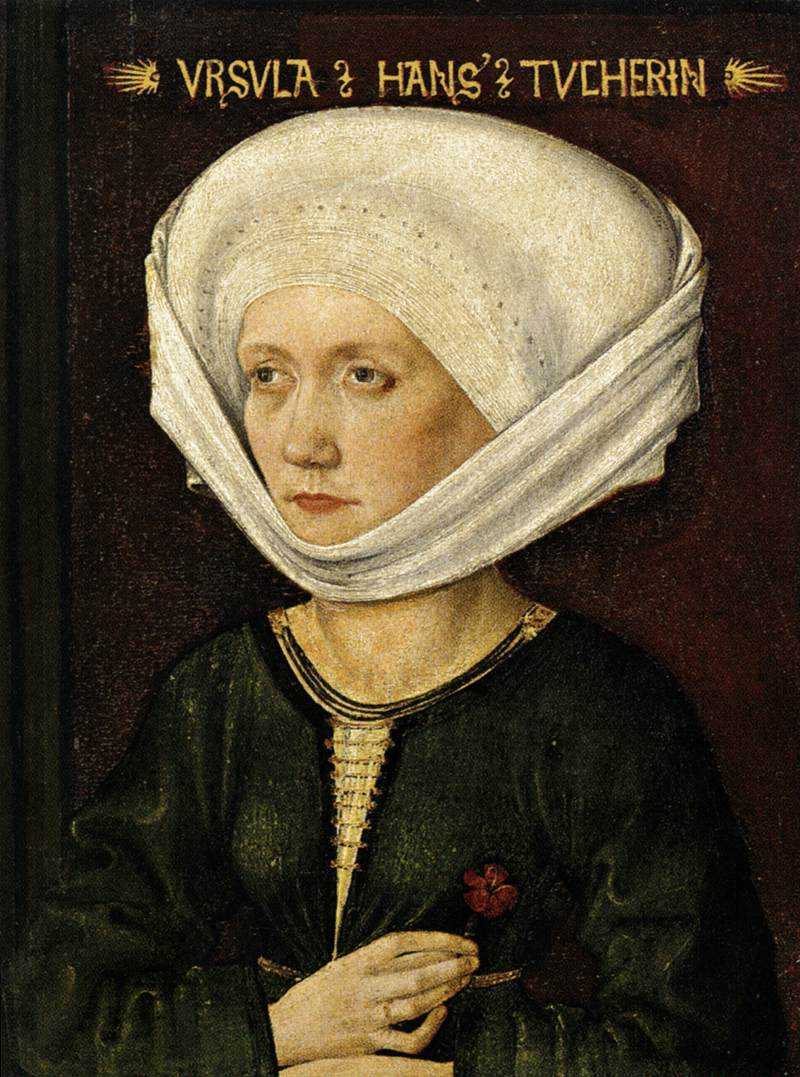
Portrait of Ursula Tucher, 1478

Wolgemut trained with his father Valentin Wolgemut (who died in 1469 or 1470) and is thought to have been an assistant to Hans Pleydenwurff in Nuremberg. He worked with Gabriel Malesskircher in Munich early in 1471, leaving the city after unsuccessfully suing Malesskircher's daughter for breach of contract, claiming she had broken off their engagement. He then returned to his late father's workshop in Nuremberg, which his mother had maintained since Valentin's death.

In 1472 he married Pleydenwurff's widow and took over his workshop; her son Wilhelm Pleydenwurff worked as an assistant, and from 1491 a partner, to Wolgemut. Some consider Wilhelm a finer artist than Wolgemut, however he died in January 1494, when he was probably still in his thirties. Wilhelm's oeuvre remains unclear, though works in various media have been attributed to him.

== Woodcuts ==
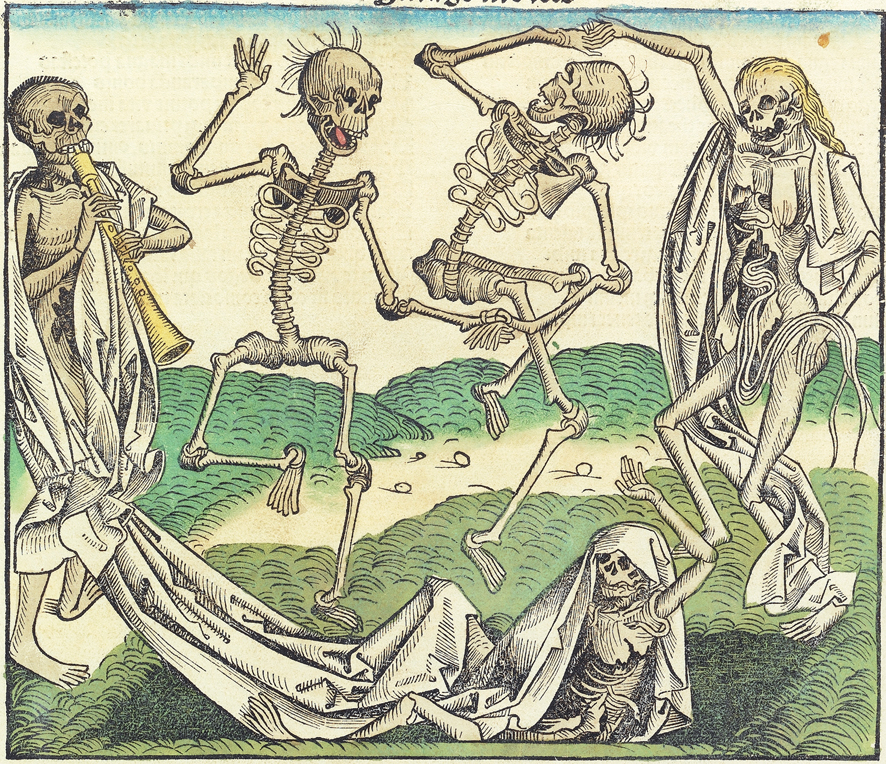
Michael Wolgemut, Danse Macabre, woodcut of the Nuremberg chronicles (f 264r), 1493

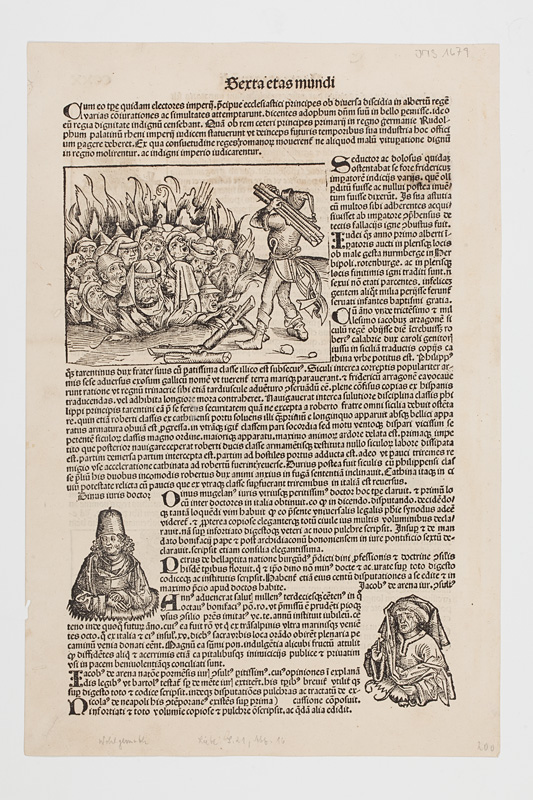
Page from the Schedelsche Weltchronik, in the collection of the Jewish Museum of Switzerland. Woodcut "Der Judenbrand" by Michael Wolgemut and Wilhelm Pleydenwulff.

Two large and copiously illustrated books have woodcuts supplied by Wolgemut and his stepson Wilhelm Pleydenwurff; both were printed and published by Germany's largest publisher, the Nuremberger Anton Koberger, who was also Dürer's godfather. The first is the Schatzbehalter der wahren Reichthumer des Heils (1491); the other is the Historia mundi, by Schedel (1493), usually known as the Nuremberg Chronicle, which is highly valued, not for the text, but for its remarkable collection of 1,809 spirited illustrations. Wolgemut and Wilhelm Pleydenwurff were first commissioned to provide the illustrations in 1487 and 1488, and a further contract of 29 December 1491 commissioned manuscript layouts of the text and illustrations. A further contact of 1492 stipulated that Koberger should provide a locked room for the blocks to be kept safely. A drawing by Wolgemut for the elaborate frontispiece, dated 1490, is in the British Museum. As with other books of the period, many of the woodcuts, showing towns, battles or kings were used more than once in the book, with the text labels merely changed. The book is large, with a double-page woodcut measuring about 342x500mm.

== Paintings ==
The earliest known work by Wolgemut is a retable consisting of four panels, dated 1465, now in the Munich gallery, a decorative work of much beauty. In 1479 he painted the retable of the high altar in the church of St Mary at Zwickau, which still exists, receiving for it the large sum of 1400 gulden. One of his finest and largest works is the great retable painted for the church of the Augustinian friars at Nuremberg, now moved into the museum; it consists of a great many panels, with figures of locally venerated saints.

In 1501 Wolgemut was employed to decorate the town hall at Goslar with a large series of paintings; some on the ceiling are on panel, and others on the walls are painted thinly in tempera on canvas. As a portrait-painter he enjoyed much repute, and some of his works of this class are very admirable for their realistic vigour and minute finish.

Outside Germany Wolgemut's paintings are scarce: the Royal Institution at Liverpool possesses two good examples--Pilate washing his Hands, and The Deposition from the Cross, parts probably of a large altar-piece. During the last ten years of his life Wohlgemut appears to have produced little by his own hand. One of his latest paintings is the retable at Schwabach, executed in 1508, the contract for which still exists. He died at Nuremberg in 1519.

Michael Wolgemut

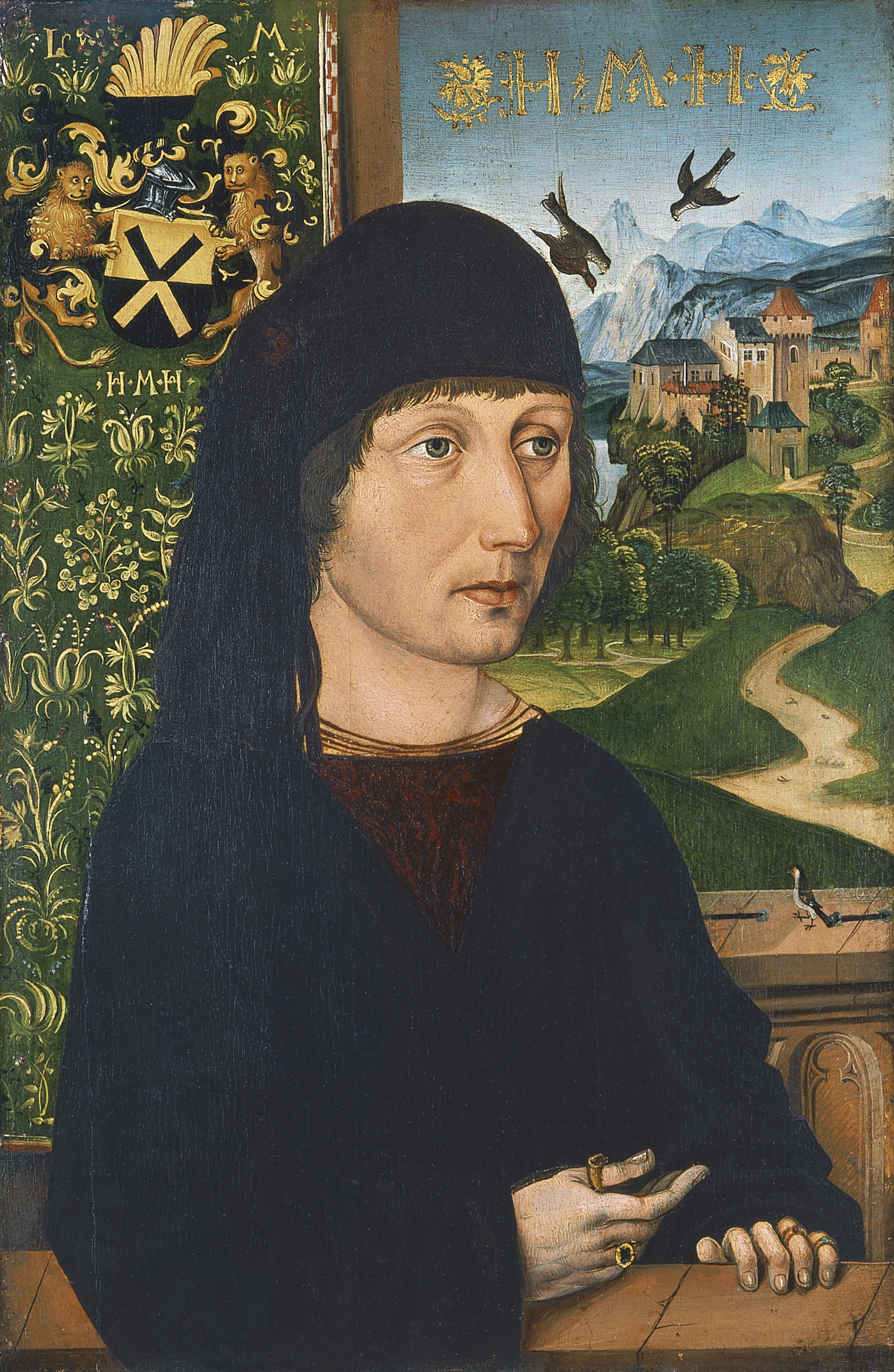
Levinus Memminger

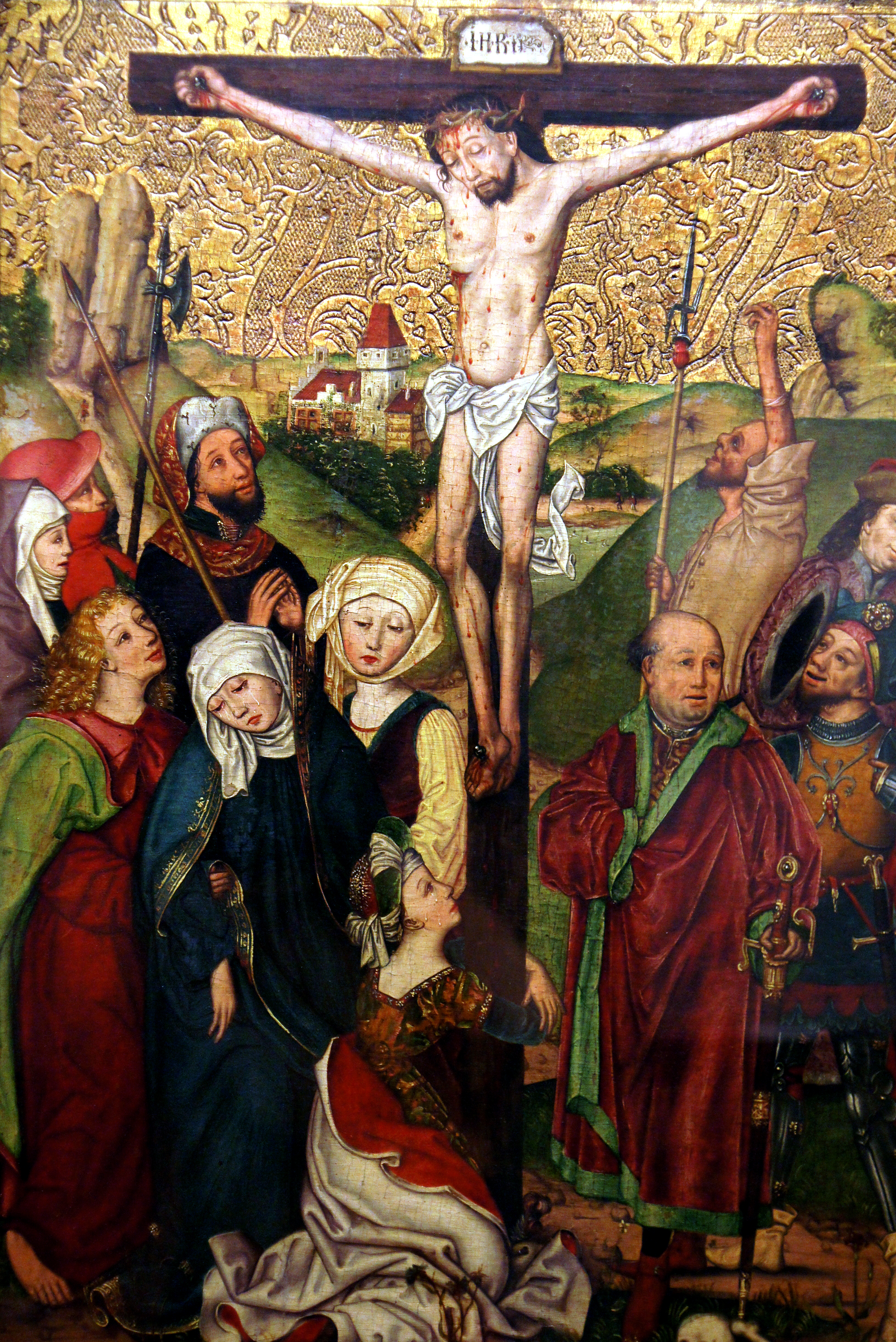
Christ crucified

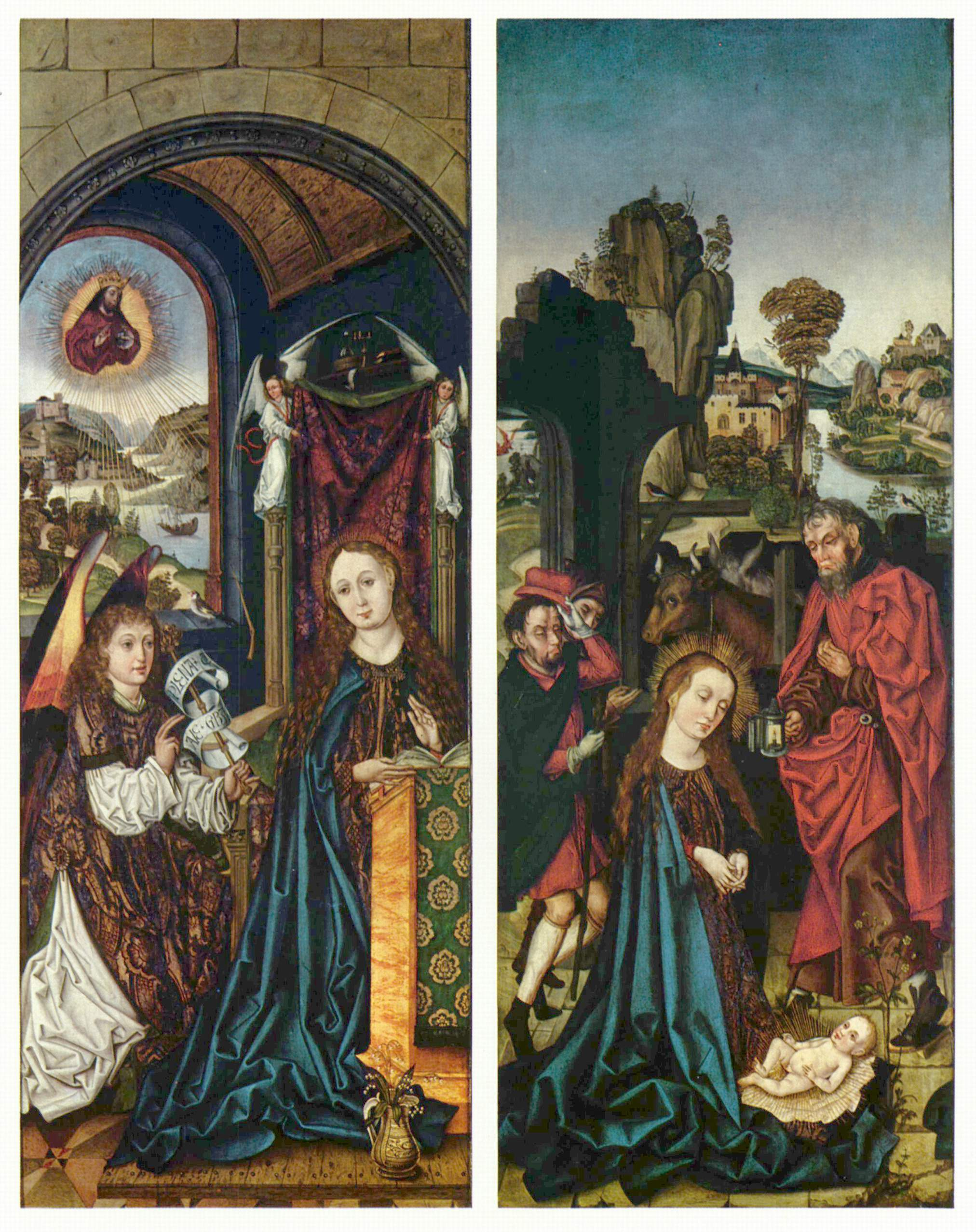
Peringsdörffer altar, Annunciation and Betlehem scene

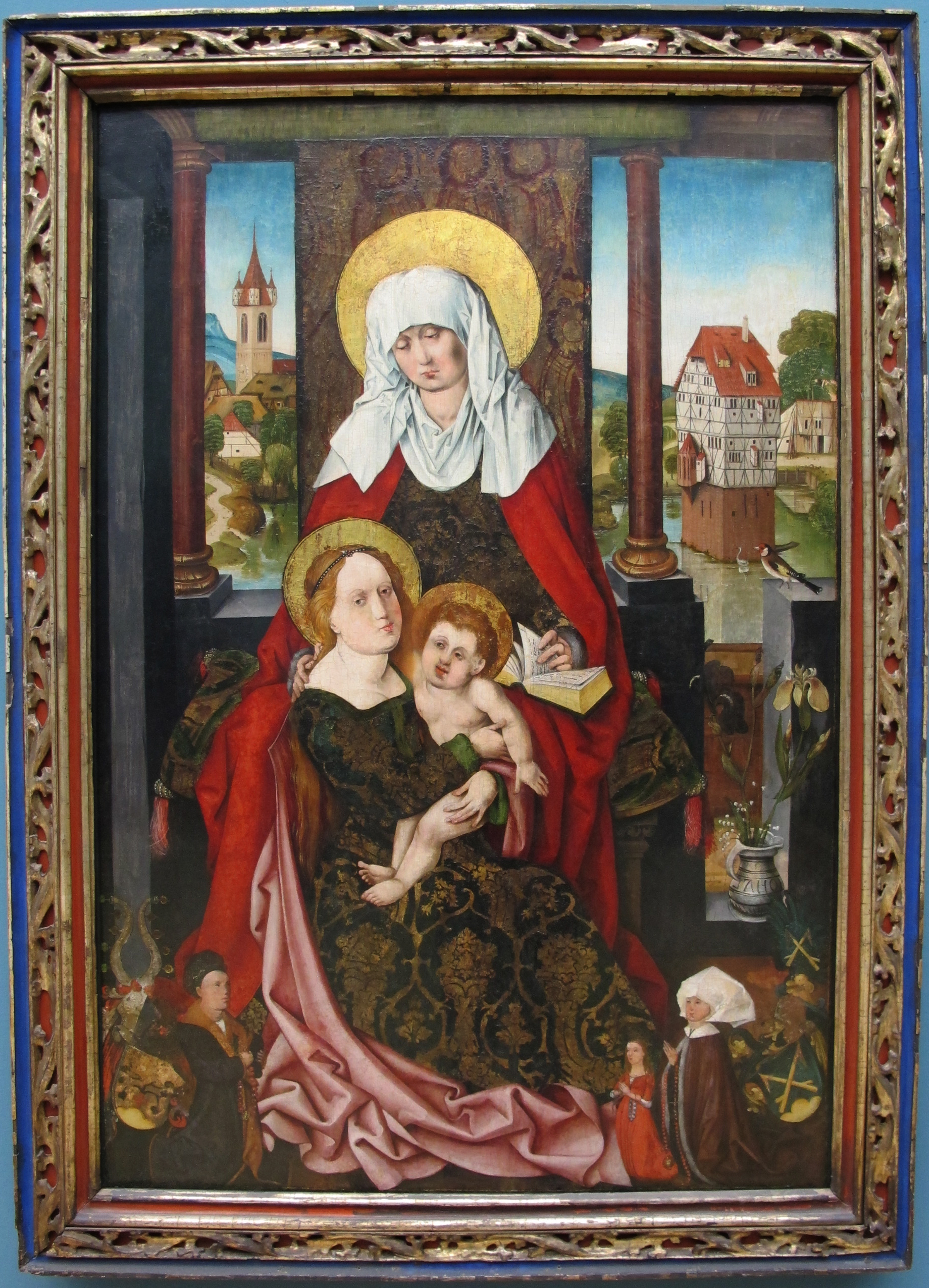
The Virgin and child with donors

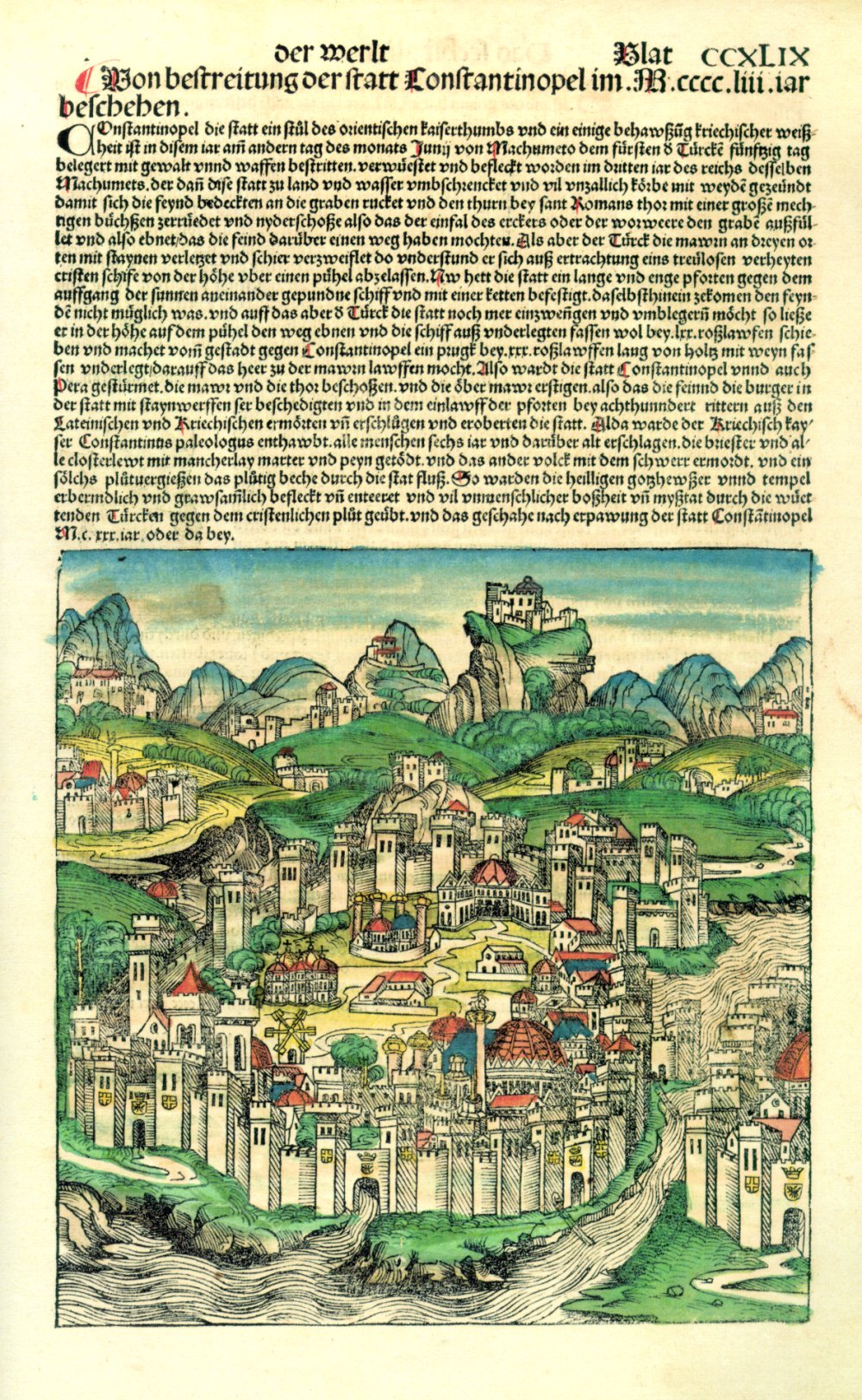
Page depicting Constantinople from Nuremberg Chronicle 1491; image is a woodcut from Wolgemut's workshop with added hand-colouring
