= Master Gerhard =

German architect

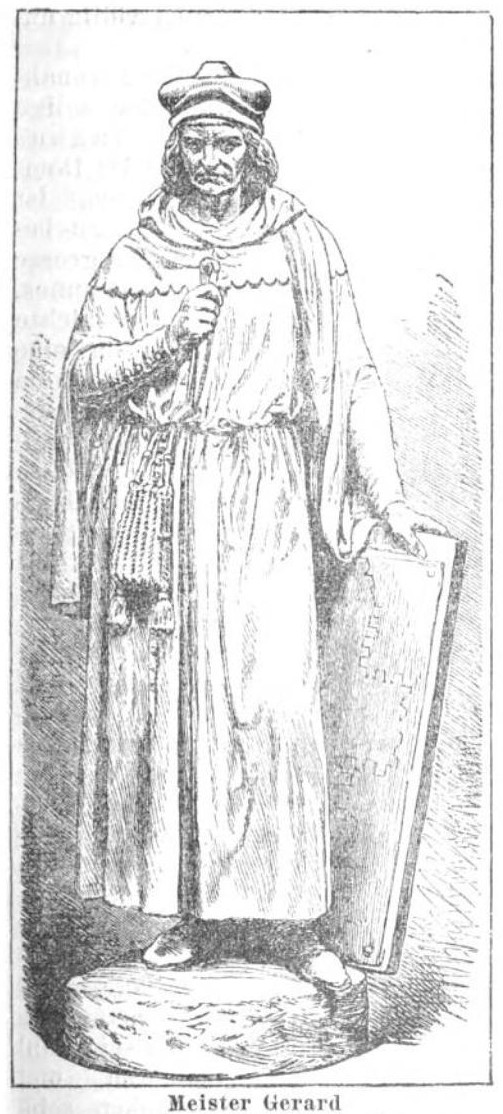
Meister Gerhard, Statue

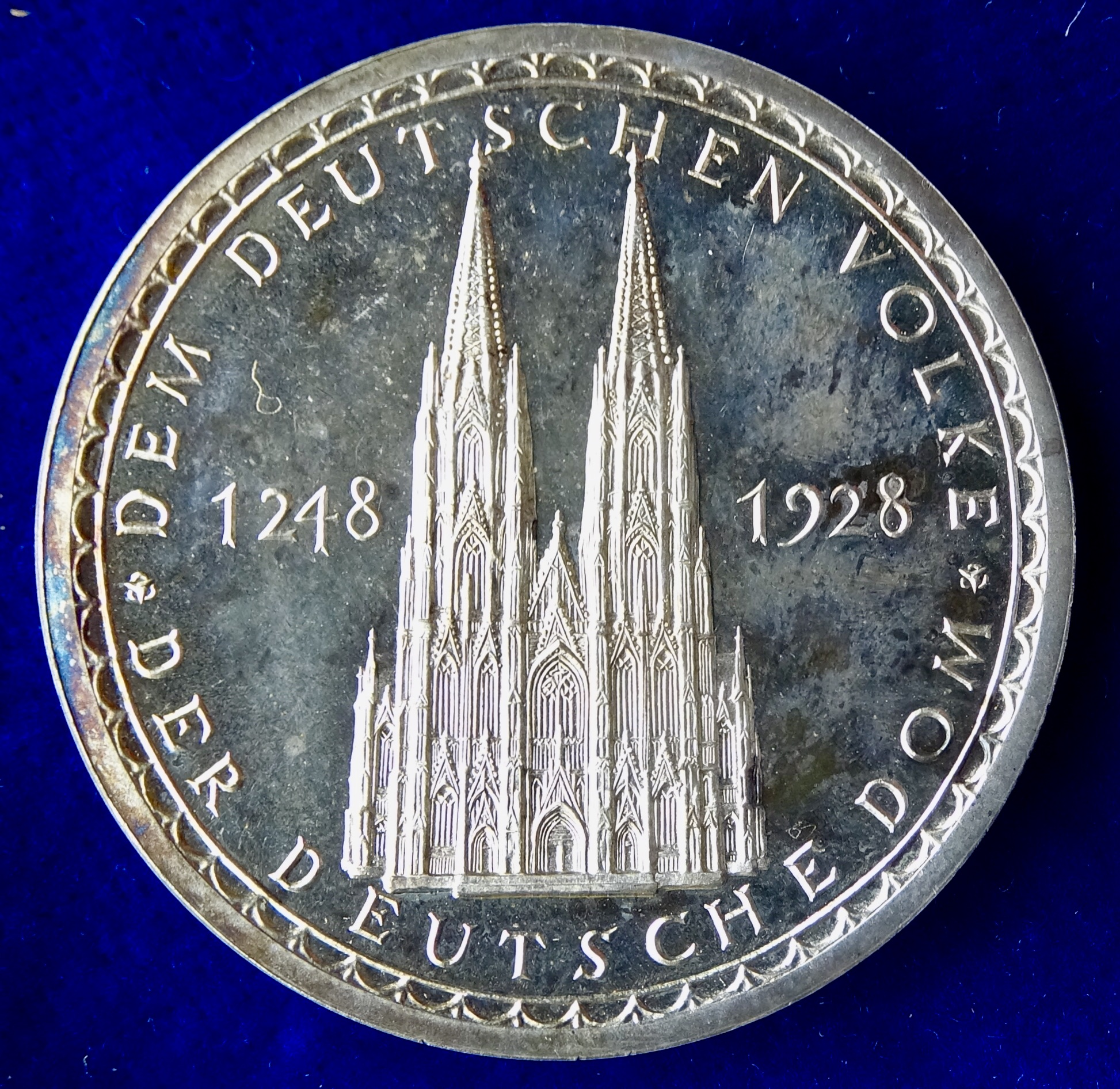
Cologne Cathedral medal 680th anniversary 1928 of the construction start by Meister Gerhard in 1248, obverse

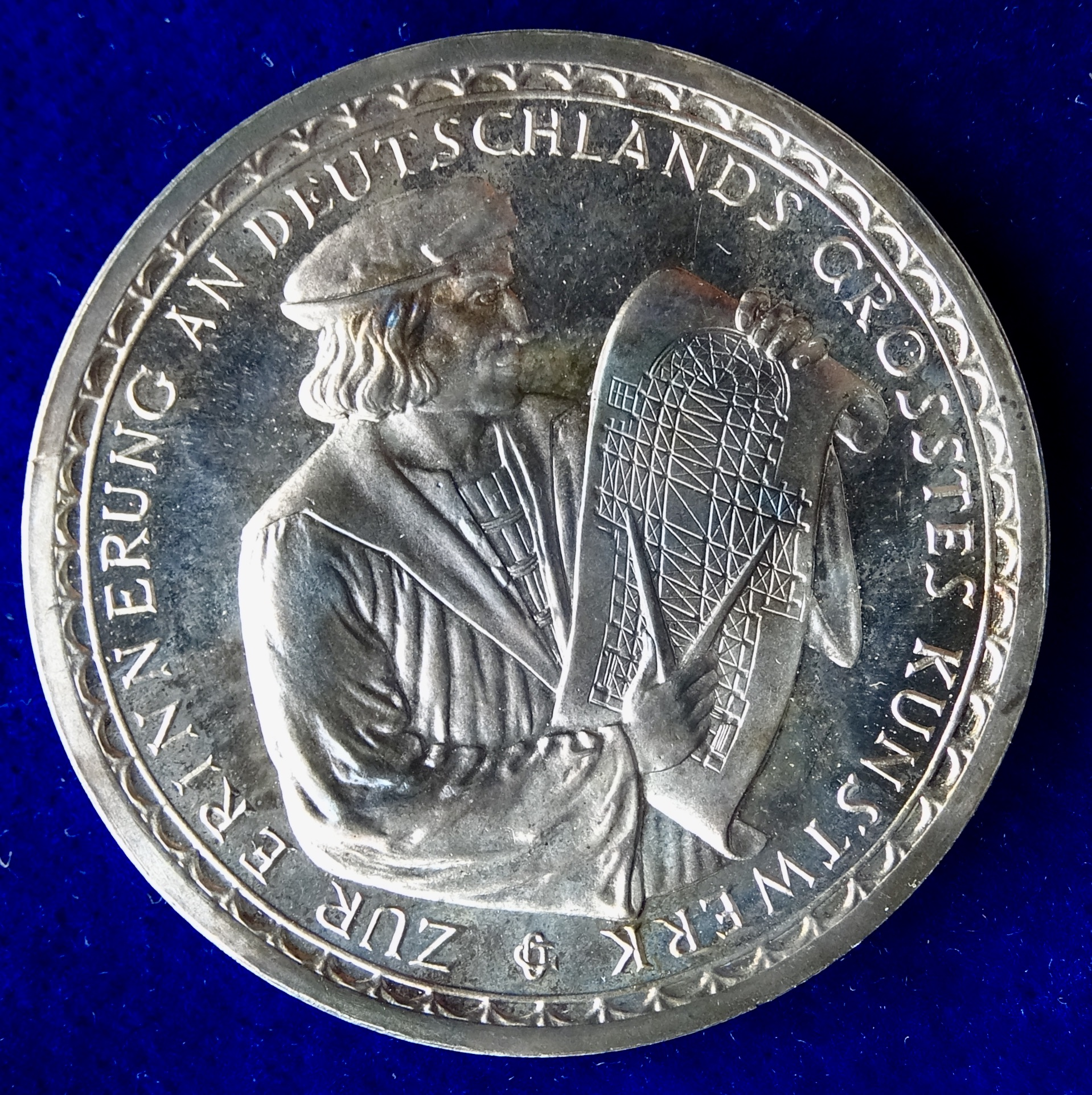
Meister Gerhard showing a plan of the cathedral at the reverse of this medal

Meister or Master Gerhard (c. 1210 allegedly in Reil – 24 or 25 April 1271 in Cologne) was the first master mason of Cologne Cathedral. He was also known as Gerhard von Rile or by the Latin version of his name, Meister Gerardus.

He fell to his death during construction of the cathedral.

== Bibliography ==
- Paul Clemen (ed.): Der Dom zu Köln (= Die Kunstdenkmäler der Rheinprovinz. Band 6, Teil III). Reprint der 2., vermehrten Auflage, Düsseldorf, 1938. Düsseldorf Schwann 1980, ISBN 3-590-32101-6
- Johann Jakob Merlo: Geschichte der Kölner Dombaumeister (= Nr. 75 der Jahrbücher des Vereins von Alterthumsfreunden im Rheinlande), 1883
- Johann Jakob Merlo: Nachrichten von dem Leben und den Werken kölnischer Künstler, S.133 Köln 1850
- Heinrich Pröhle: Meister Gerhard von Rile, des Kölner Domes Baumeister, in: Rheinlands schönste Sagen und Geschichten. Berlin 1886, S. 213-216 (E-Text)
- Herbert Rode (1964). "Gerhard". Neue Deutsche Biographie (in German). Vol. 6. Berlin: Duncker & Humblot. pp. 272–272.
- Sulpiz Boisserée: Meister Gerhard, muthmaßlicher Baumeister des Doms v. Köln. (Geschichte u. Beschreibung des Doms v. Köln). In: Kunstblatt Nr. 13 (1824)
- Max Hasak: Der Dom zu Köln, Berlin 1911, S. 55ff online
