= Cologne Cathedral =

Historic church in Cologne, Germany

- The Cathedral of St. Peter
- Hohe Domkirche zu Köln; Kölner Dom
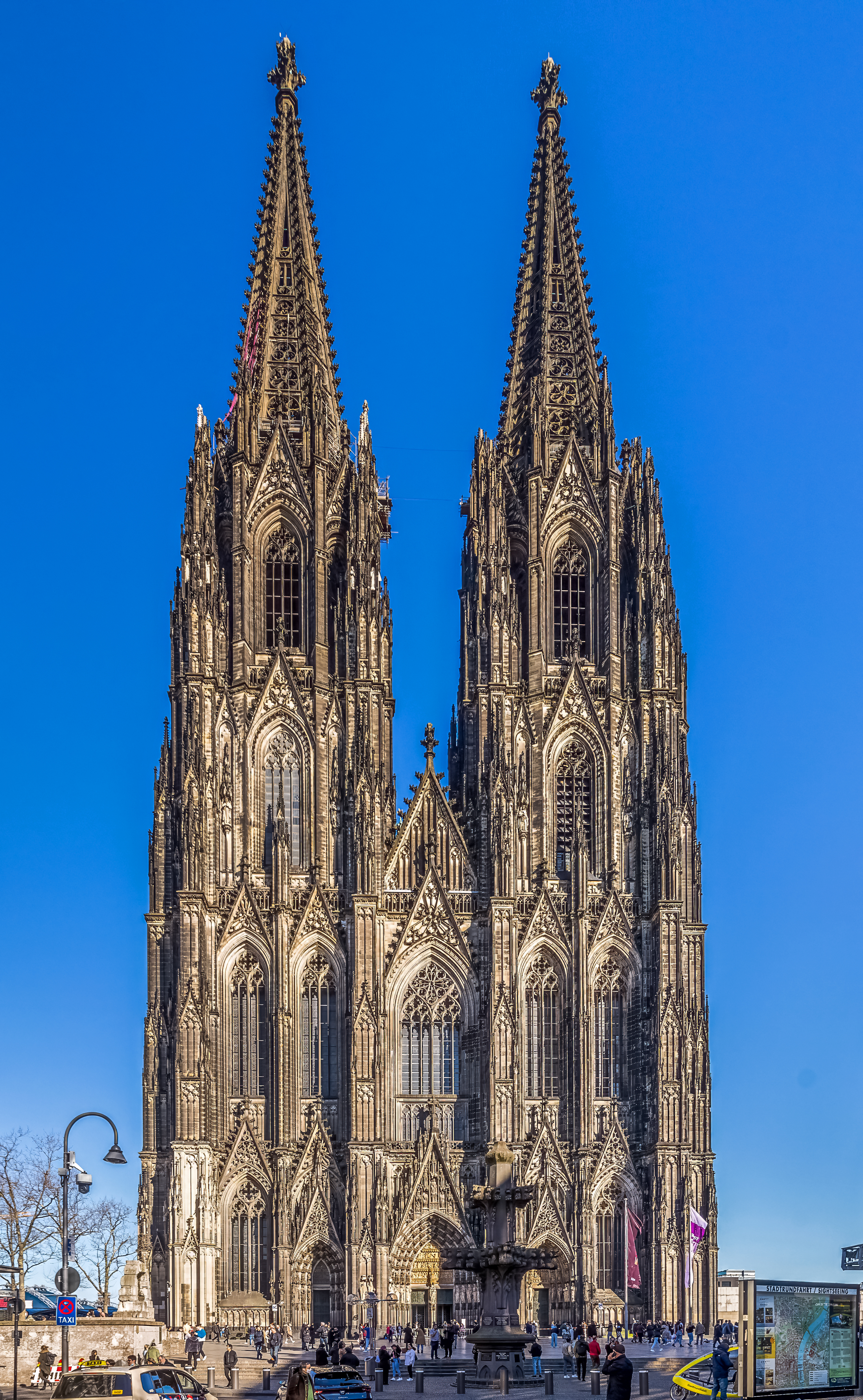
- Cathedral façade
- Cologne Cathedral
- 50°56′29″N 06°57′30″E
- Location: Cologne
- Country: Germany
- Denomination: Catholic Church
- Website: koelner-dom.de https://www.koelner-dom.de/en

History
- Status: Cathedral
- Dedication: Saint Peter
- Consecrated: 15 October 1880

Architecture
- Functional status: Active
- Style: Gothic, Gothic revival
- Years built: 1248–1560; 1842–1880

Specifications
- Length: 144.5 m (474 ft)
- Width: 86.25 m (283.0 ft)

Administration
- Province: Cologne
- Archdiocese: Cologne

Clergy
- Archbishop: Rainer Woelki
- Vicar: Jörg Stockem
- Building details

Record height
- Tallest in the world from 1880 to 1884/1890^{[I]}
- Preceded by: Rouen Cathedral
- Surpassed by: Washington Monument (overall); Ulm Minster (building)

Height
- Antenna spire: 157.4 m (516 ft)

UNESCO World Heritage Site
- Criteria: Cultural: i, ii, iv
- Reference: 292
- Inscription: 1996 (20th Session)
- Endangered: 2004–2006

Cologne Cathedral (German: Kölner Dom, pronounced [ˌkœlnɐ ˈdoːm]) is a Catholic cathedral in Cologne, North Rhine-Westphalia, Germany. It is the seat of the Archbishop of Cologne and of the administration of the Archdiocese of Cologne. It is a renowned monument of German Catholicism and Gothic architecture and was declared a World Heritage Site in 1996. It is Germany's most visited landmark, attracting an average of 6 million people a year. At 157 m (515 ft), the cathedral is the tallest twin-spired church in the world, the third tallest church in Europe after Sagrada Família and Ulm Minster, and the tallest cathedral in the world.

Construction of Cologne Cathedral began in 1248, but was halted in the years around 1560. Attempts to complete construction began around 1814, but the project was not properly funded until the 1840s. The edifice was completed to its original medieval plan in 1880. The towers for its two huge spires give the cathedral the largest façade of any church in the world.

Cologne's medieval builders had planned a grand structure to house the reliquary of the Three Kings and fit for its role as a place of worship for the Holy Roman Emperor. Despite having been left incomplete during the medieval period, Cologne Cathedral eventually became unified as "a masterpiece of exceptional intrinsic value" and "a powerful testimony to the strength and persistence of Christian belief in medieval and modern Europe". In Cologne, only the telecommunications tower is higher than the cathedral.

== Predecessor buildings ==
=== Merovingian episcopal church ===
Maternus of Cologne was the first bishop of Cologne in around 313. However, Cologne's Christian community, still small at this time, did not gather in a church, but in a residential building, which is thought to have been located on the cathedral hill below today's choir. After the collapse of Roman rule on the Rhine, the Merovingian petty kings residing in Cologne built an episcopal church on this site in the 6th century, which was eventually around 40 to 50 metres (130 to 160 ft) long and equipped with an ambon. This building, which was probably built by King Theudebert I, served as a burial place for the royal family; among others, the king's wife Wisigard was buried here around 537. However, the excavation finds under the cathedral choir do not allow a complete reconstruction of the buildings from the Merovingian period.

=== Baptistry ===
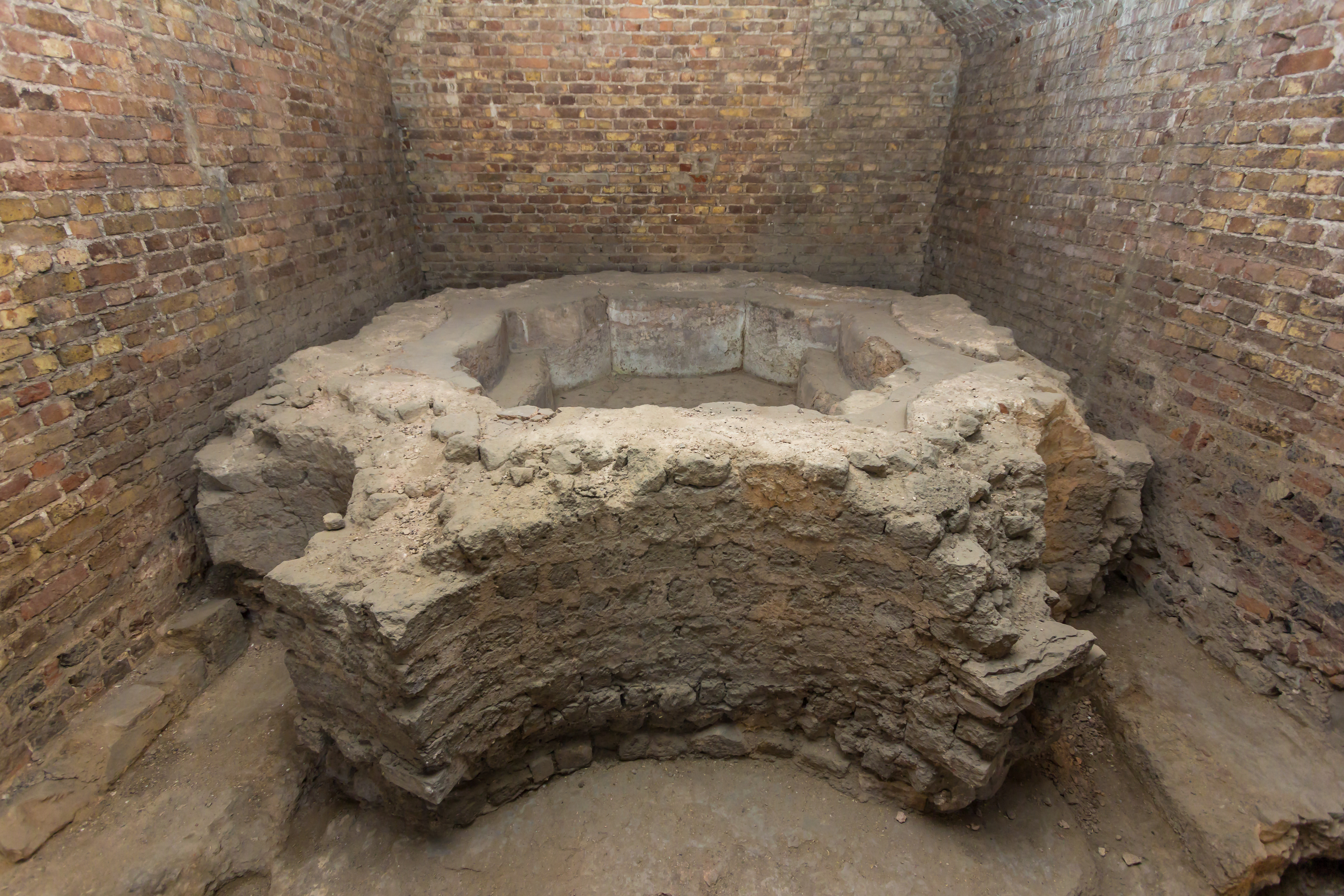
Early Christian testimony: Baptistery east of the cathedral

Work on Cologne Cathedral was finished in 1880. At that time, the cathedral had a height of 157 metres (515 ft), making it the tallest building in the world – after a total of 632 years of construction. Except for a few centimetres, both towers are the same height. Already in late antiquity, there was a baptistery to the east of the cathedral choir, where the early Christians, following the rite of the time, stepped into knee-deep water and were completely doused. It is assumed that the baptismal font, which dates back to the 5th century, was originally located in the garden of the Roman house that served as a Christian meeting place. Later, the baptistry built above the pool was presumably combined with the cathedral church to form a single building complex, although there is no archaeological evidence of this today. When Hildebold Cathedral was built and equipped with a baptismal font due to the changed rite, only the baptismal piscina remained from the baptistery. Today, this piscina, which is accessible in the base of the cathedral, is considered the oldest evidence of Christian worship in Cologne.

=== Hildebold Cathedral ===
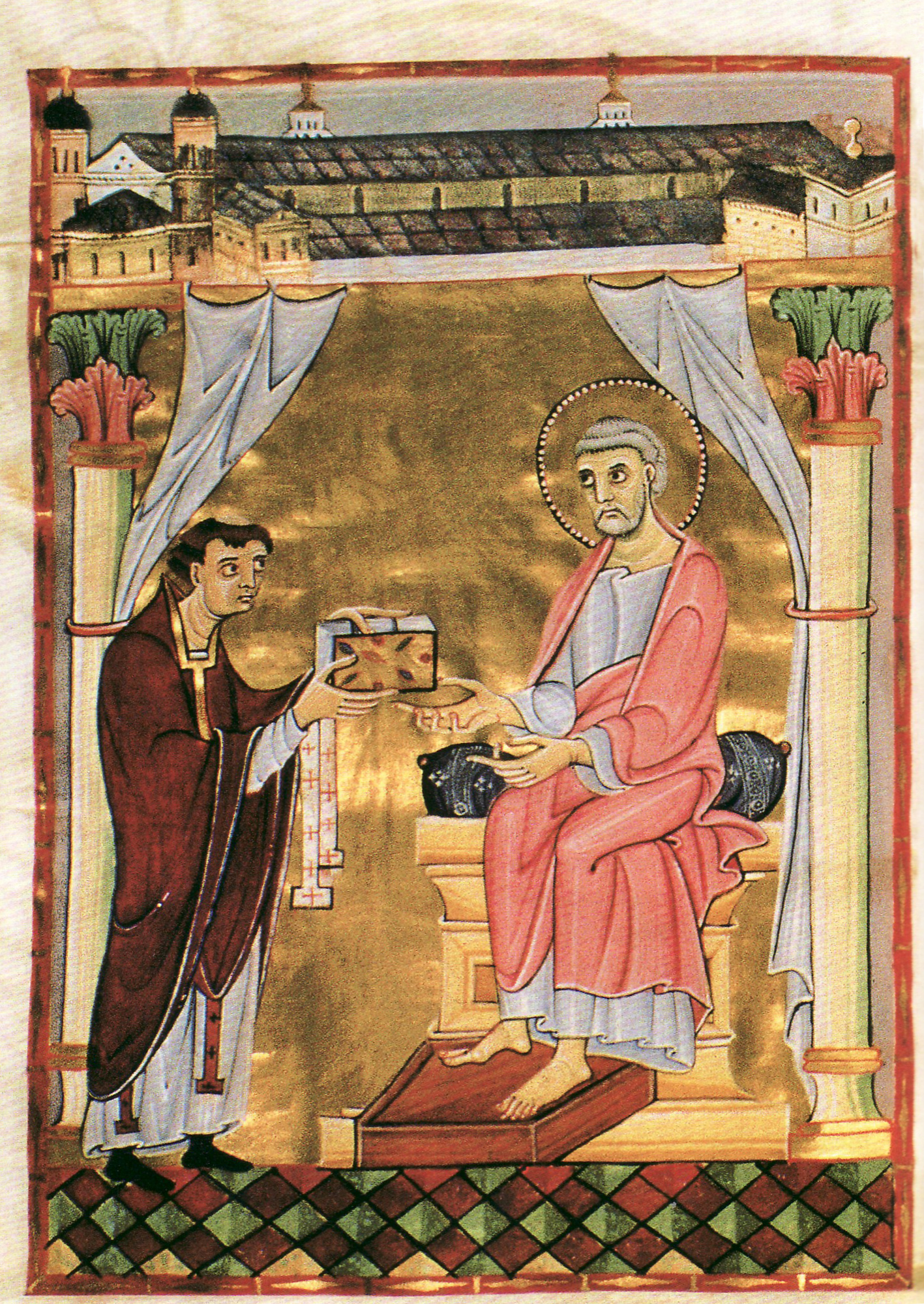
Ottonian architectural drawing: Hildebold Cathedral in the Hillinus Codex

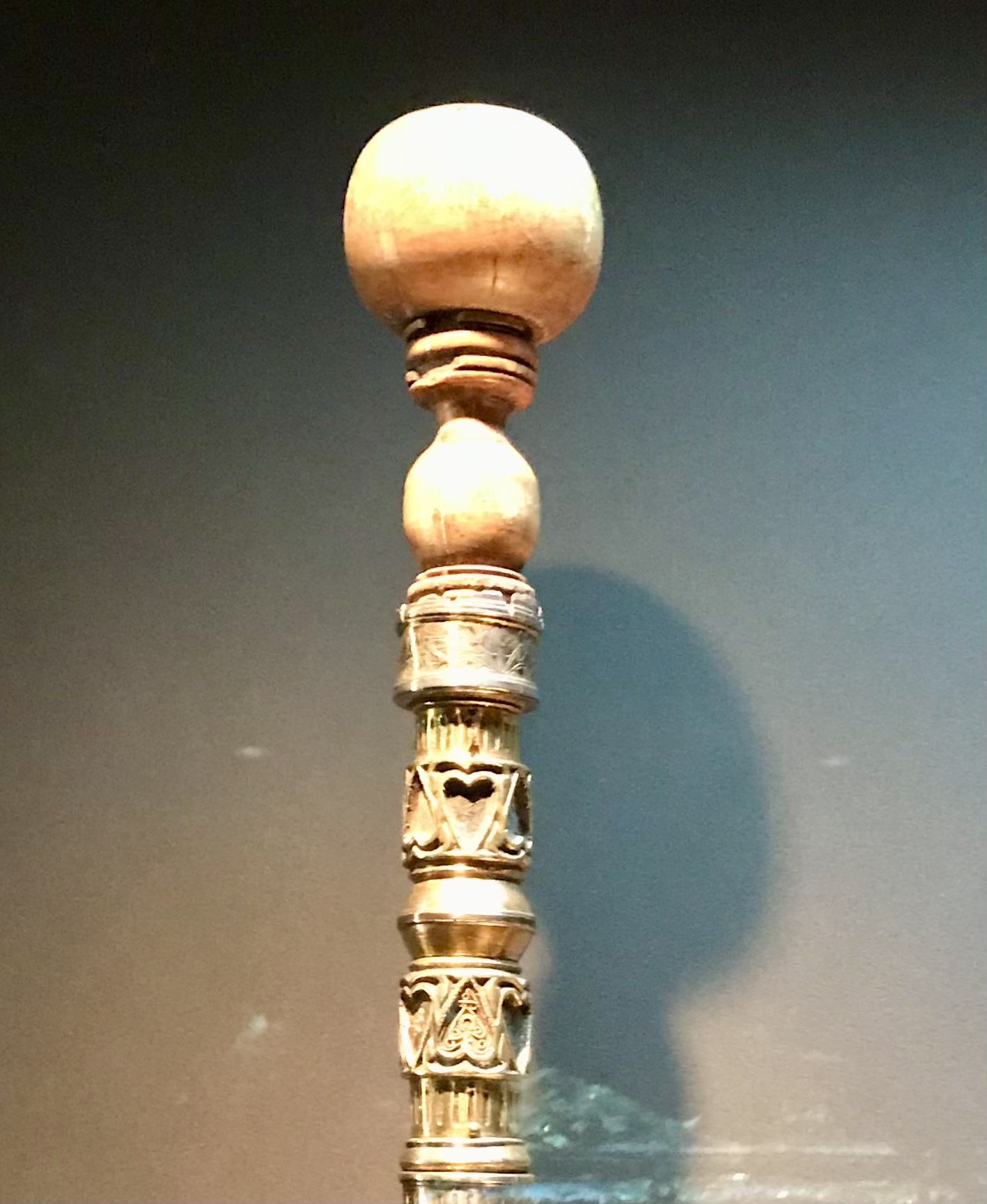
Legendary relic: St. Peter's staff from the Cologne Cathedral treasury

In Carolingian times, the Old Cathedral was built on Cologne Cathedral Hill and consecrated in 870. The cathedral is now known as Hildebold Cathedral after Bishop Hildebold, who was a close advisor to Charlemagne and died in 818. However, it is unclear how much the bishop contributed to the building. He probably started the new construction, which Charlemagne also generously supported. The bishop's residence was originally located next to the cathedral.

With a length of around 95 metres (312 ft), Hildebold Cathedral was one of the largest Carolingian churches ever built and became the architectural role model for numerous churches in the early Holy Roman Empire. It was built in the Carolingian tradition as a basilica with two choirs, with the east choir dedicated to Mary, mother of Jesus and the more important choir in the west to the memory of Saint Peter. Through its patronage, but also in its architecture, Hildebold Cathedral made reference to Old St. Peter's Basilica in Rome and was regarded as the St. Peter's Basilica of the North. This was intended to underline Cologne's claim to be a holy city and faithful daughter of the Roman Church. The so-called reliquary-staff of Saint Peter and the chains of Saint Peter were among the church's most important relics. The Hillinus Codex from the 11th century shows Hildebold Cathedral in an unusually realistic depiction for the time. Today, the foundation walls of the Carolingian basilica have been revealed by the cathedral excavations.

On 23 July 1164, the Archbishop of Cologne and Imperial Archchancellor Rainald of Dassel brought the bones of the Three Wise Men from Milan to Cologne, which was perceived as a "propaganda success". The relics had been left to the archbishop by Emperor Frederick Barbarossa from his spoils of war. They had been considered worthy of veneration at least since their transfer. Whether Rainald von Dassel himself or the Milanese patricians should be regarded as the "inventors" of the relics is disputed in academic literature. In any case, between 1190 and 1225, the Shrine of the Three Kings was made for the highly respected saints in Cologne, which is considered one of the most sophisticated goldsmith's works of the Middle Ages; the shrine was placed in the center of the Old Cathedral. Cologne thus became an internationally renowned place of pilgrimage in Europe. To oversee the pilgrim crowds, an office of custos regum ("guardian of the kings") was established after 1162. However, the only narrow side portal of the cathedral was not very suitable for the crowds of pilgrims, as it had to be used as an entrance and an exit at the same time.

== Construction ==
Within the construction of the Gothic cathedral in 1248, the Old Cathedral was to be demolished step by step. However, careless demolition work and fire destroyed not only the east choir, but almost the entire cathedral; the Shrine of the Three Kings was saved from the fire. The western parts of Hildebold Cathedral were provisionally rebuilt and were only taken down after 1322, when the Gothic choir was completed and construction of the Gothic nave began.

== Building history of the Gothic cathedral ==
=== Medieval beginning ===
The foundation stone was laid on Saturday, 15 August 1248, by Archbishop Konrad von Hochstaden. The eastern arm was completed under the direction of Master Gerhard, was consecrated in 1322 and sealed off by a temporary wall so it could be used as the work continued. Eighty-four misericords in the choir date from this building phase. This work ceased in 1473, leaving the south tower complete to the belfry level and crowned with a huge crane that remained in place as a landmark of the Cologne skyline for 400 years. Some work proceeded intermittently on the structure of the nave between the west front and the eastern arm, but during the 16th century this also stopped.

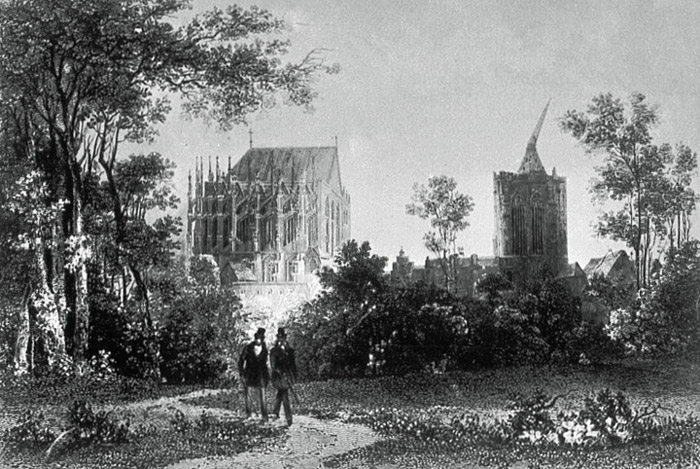
The unfinished cathedral in 1820, engraved by Henry Winkles. The huge crane on the tower of the cathedral is visible in the picture.

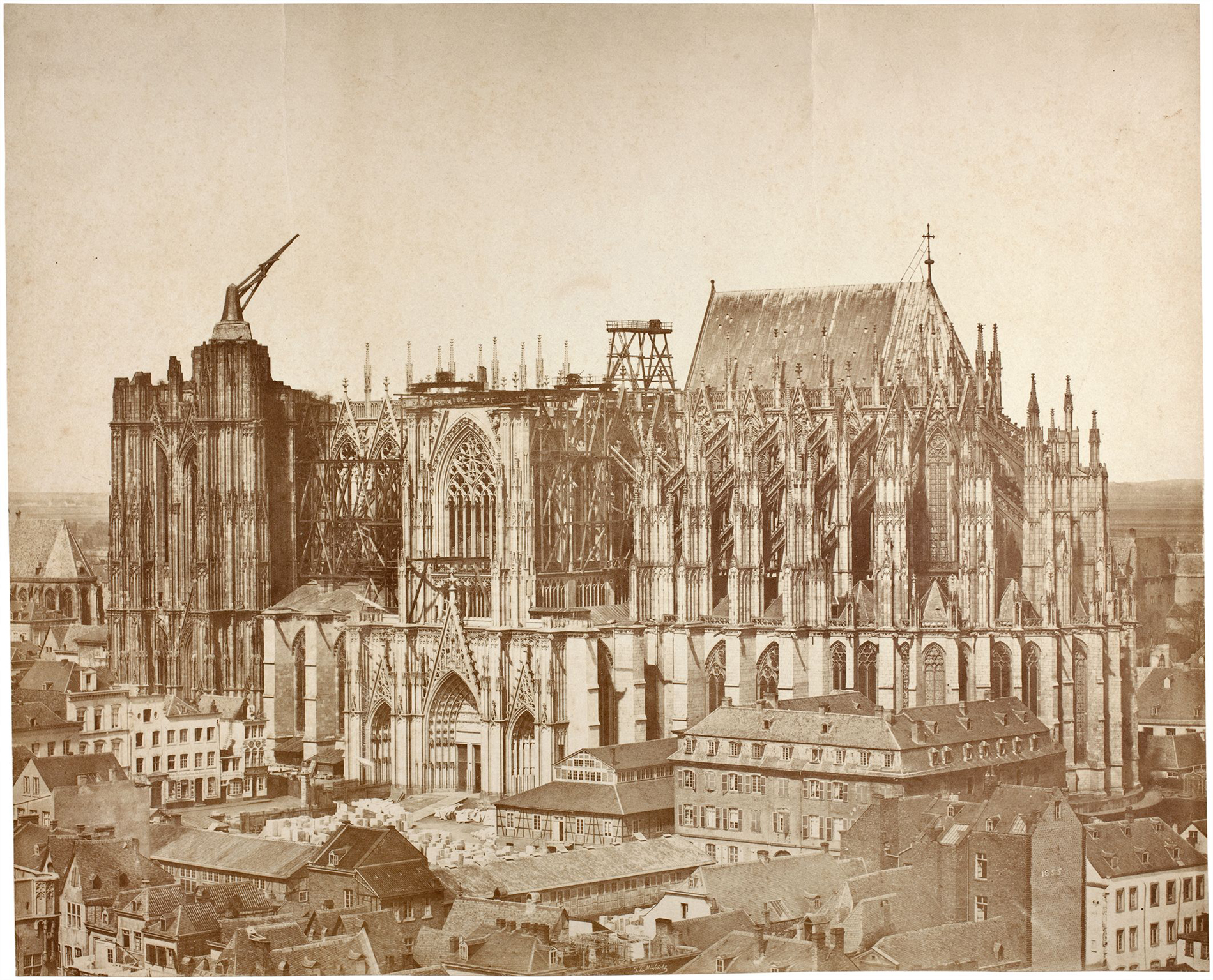
The unfinished cathedral in 1855. The medieval crane was still in place, while construction for the nave had been resumed earlier in 1814.

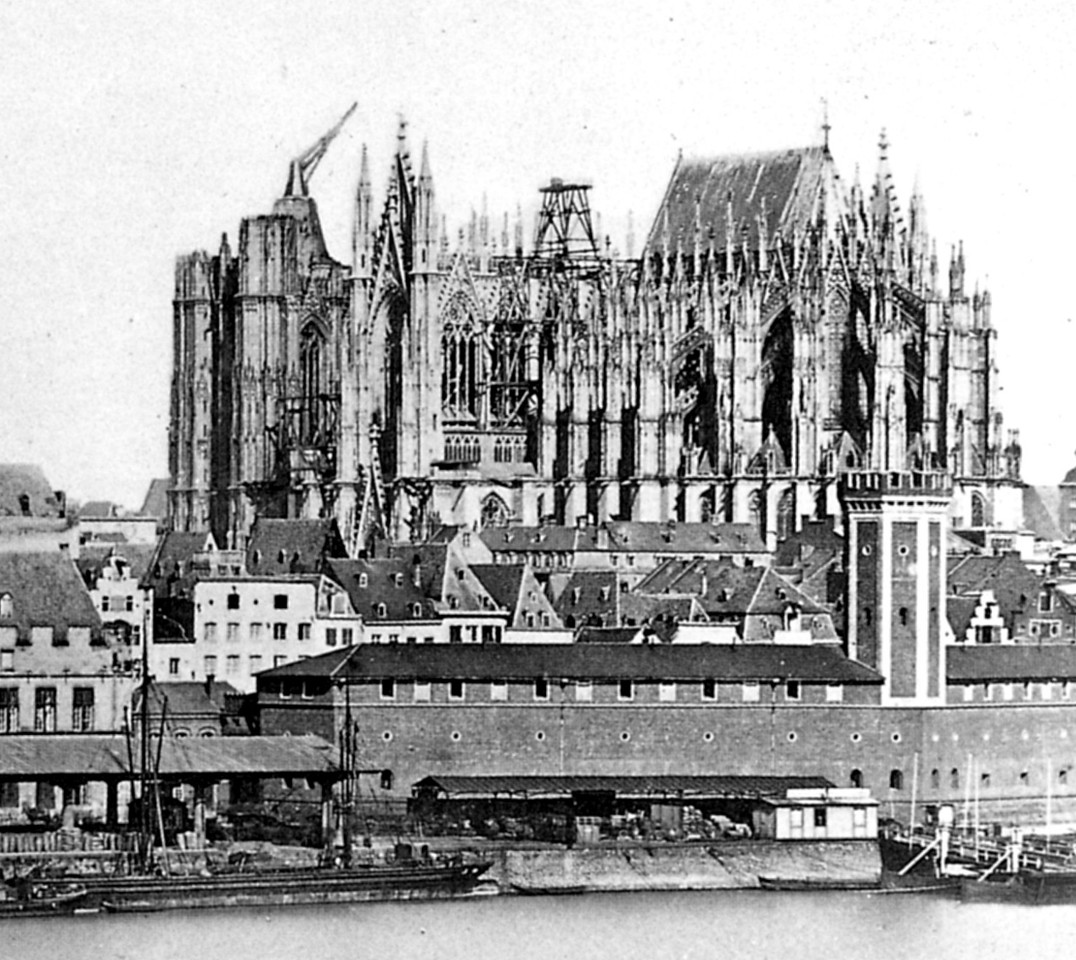
The unfinished cathedral in 1856. The east end had been finished and roofed, while other parts of the building are in various stages of construction.

=== 19th-century completion ===
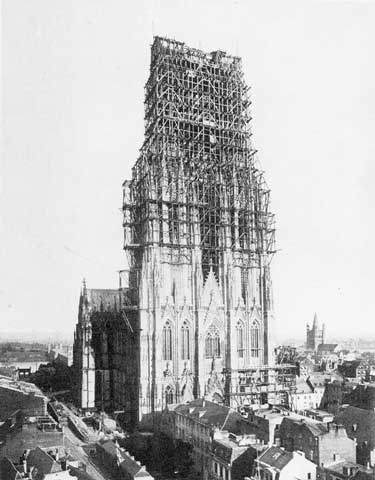
The cathedral in 1880, nearing the end of its construction.

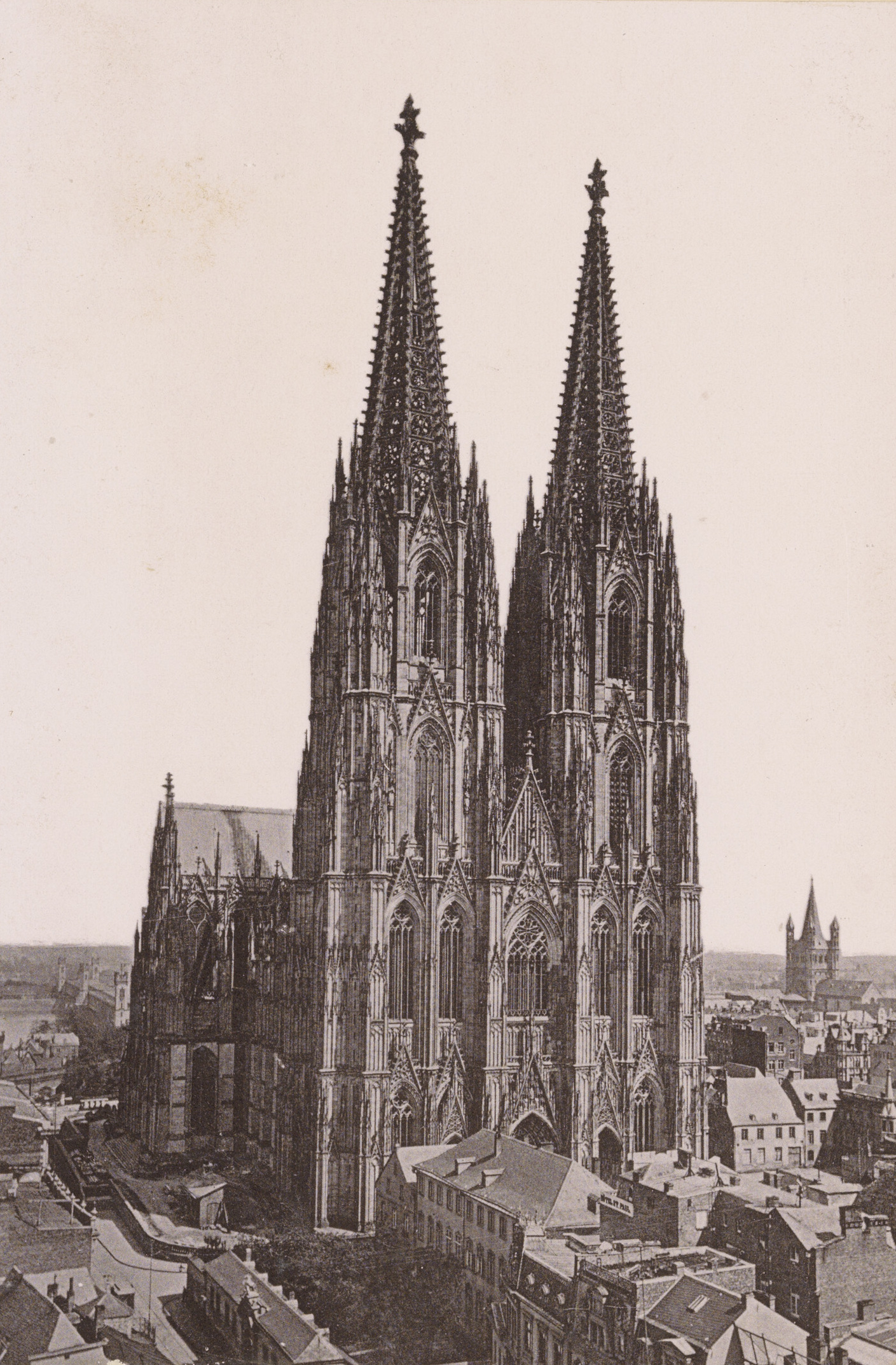
The cathedral in 1890

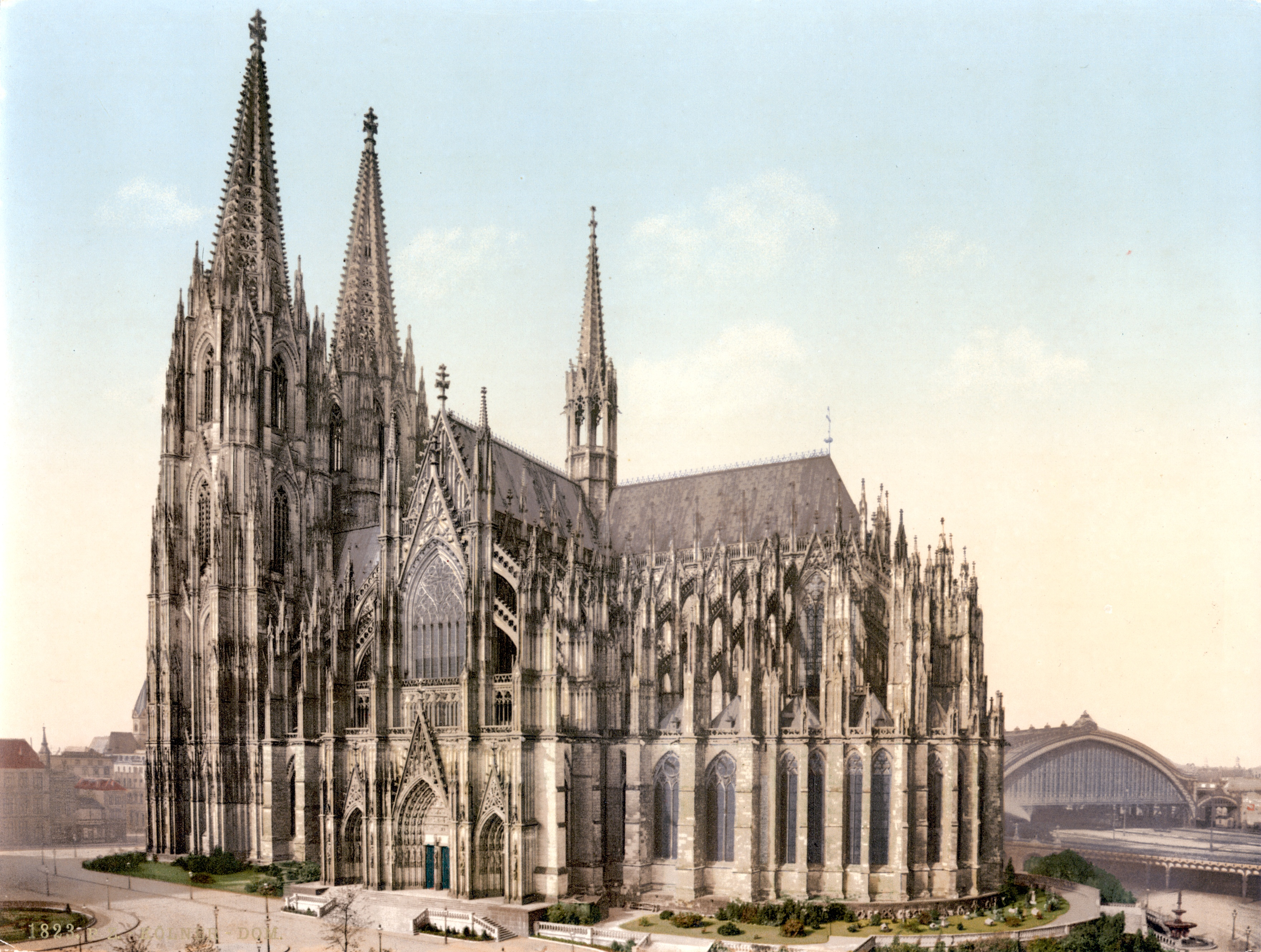
The cathedral around 1900

With the 19th-century Romantic enthusiasm for the Middle Ages, and spurred by the discovery of the original plan for the façade, the Protestant Prussian Court working with the church, committed to completing the cathedral. It was achieved by civic effort; the Central-Dombauverein, founded in 1842, raised two-thirds of the enormous costs, while the Prussian state supplied the remaining third. The state saw this as a way to improve its relations with the large number of Catholic subjects it had gained in 1815, but especially after 1871, it was regarded as a project to symbolize German nationhood.

Construction resumed in 1842 to the original design of the surviving medieval plans and drawings, but using more modern construction techniques, including iron roof girders. Ernst Friedrich Zwirner led the cathedral's construction until his death in 1861, and designed several parts including a chapel dedicated to St Mary and the crossing tower. The nave was completed and all three towers were added. The bells were installed in the 1870s. The largest bell is St. Petersglocke.

The completion of Germany's largest cathedral was celebrated as a national event on 15 October 1880, 632 years after construction had begun. The celebration was attended by Emperor Wilhelm I. With a height of 157.38 m (516.3 ft), it was the tallest building in the world for four years until the completion of the Washington Monument.

=== World War II and post-war history ===
The twin spires of the cathedral were an easily recognizable navigational landmark for aircraft bombing during World War II. The cathedral suffered fourteen kicks by aerial bombs during the war. Badly damaged, it nevertheless remained standing in an otherwise completely flattened city.

On 6 March 1945, an area west of the cathedral (Marzellenstrasse/Trankgasse) was the site of intense combat between American tanks of the 3rd Armored Division and a Panther Ausf. A of Panzer brigade 106 Feldherrnhalle. A nearby Panther, a German medium tank, was sitting by a pile of rubble near a train station right by the twin spires of the Cologne Cathedral. The Panther successfully knocked out two Sherman tanks, killing three men, before it was destroyed by a T26E3 Pershing, nicknamed Eagle 7 minutes later. Film footage of that battle survives.

In 1944, Willy Weyres was appointed as the cathedral's architect. Repairs of the war damage were completed sufficiently and the cathedral reopened in 1956, the work being overseen by Weyres. The crossing or central tower, completed in 1860 and designed by Zwirner, was severely damaged by the bombing, though remained structurally sound. In 1965, Weyres redesigned the cladding of the damaged tower in an Art Deco style, with the decorative angels designed by Erlefried Hoppe. This, along with his demolition of the war-damaged St Mary's Chapel designed at the same time by Zwirner, was considered controversial, with the modern redesign of the crossing tower being called a "wart" on the cathedral by some critics.

A repair to part of the northwest tower, carried out in 1944 using poor-quality brick taken from a nearby ruined building, remained visible as a reminder of the war until 2005, when it was restored to its original appearance.

To investigate whether the bombings had damaged the foundations of the Dom, archaeological excavations began in 1946 under the leadership of Otto Doppelfeld and were concluded in 1997. One of the most meaningful excavations of churches, they revealed previously unknown details of earlier buildings on the site.

Repair and maintenance work is constantly being carried out in the building, which is rarely free of scaffolding, as wind, rain, and pollution slowly eat away at the stones. The Dombauhütte, established to build the cathedral and keep it in repair, employs skilled stonemasons for the purpose. Half the costs of repair and maintenance are still borne by the Dombauverein.

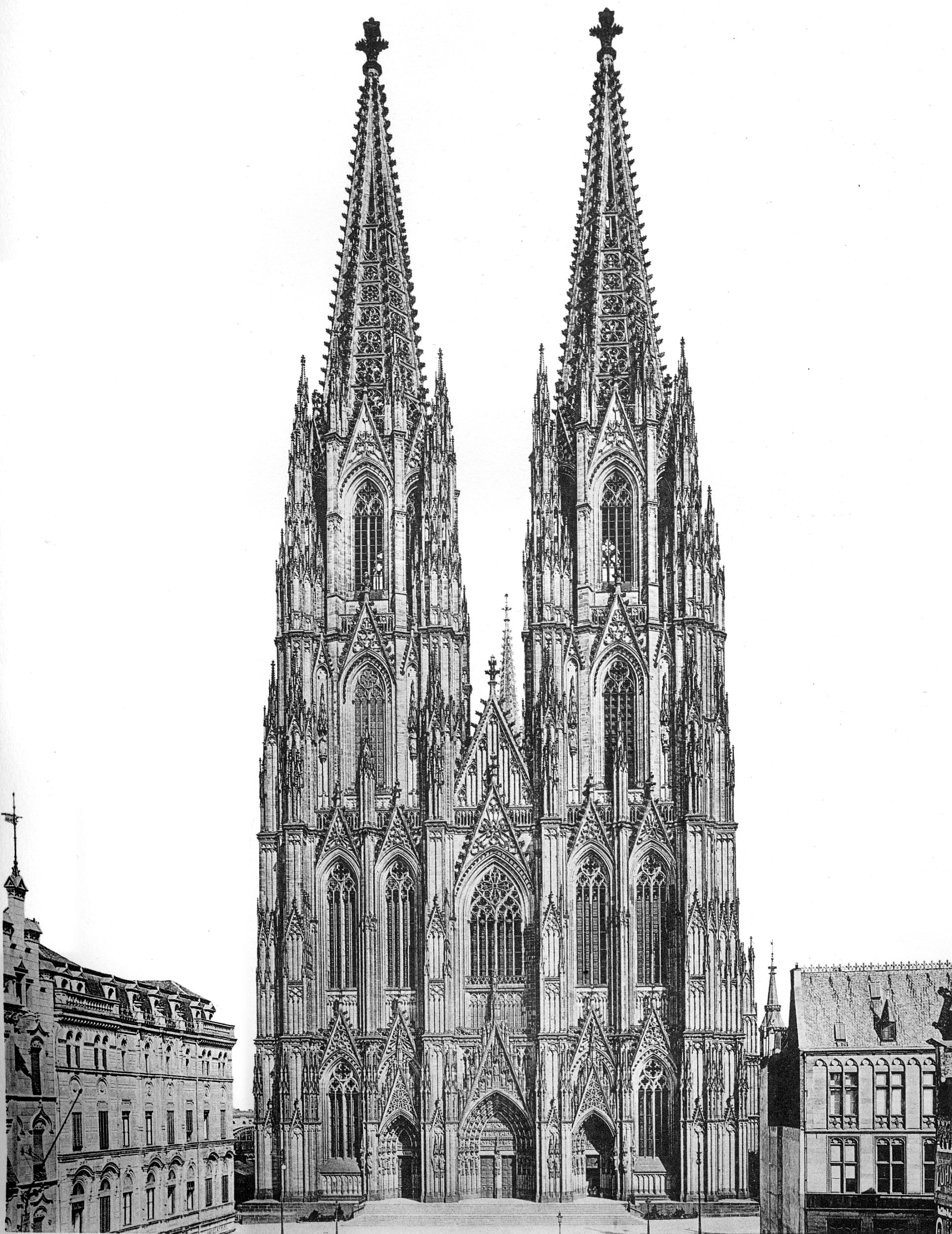
The west front of the completed cathedral in 1911

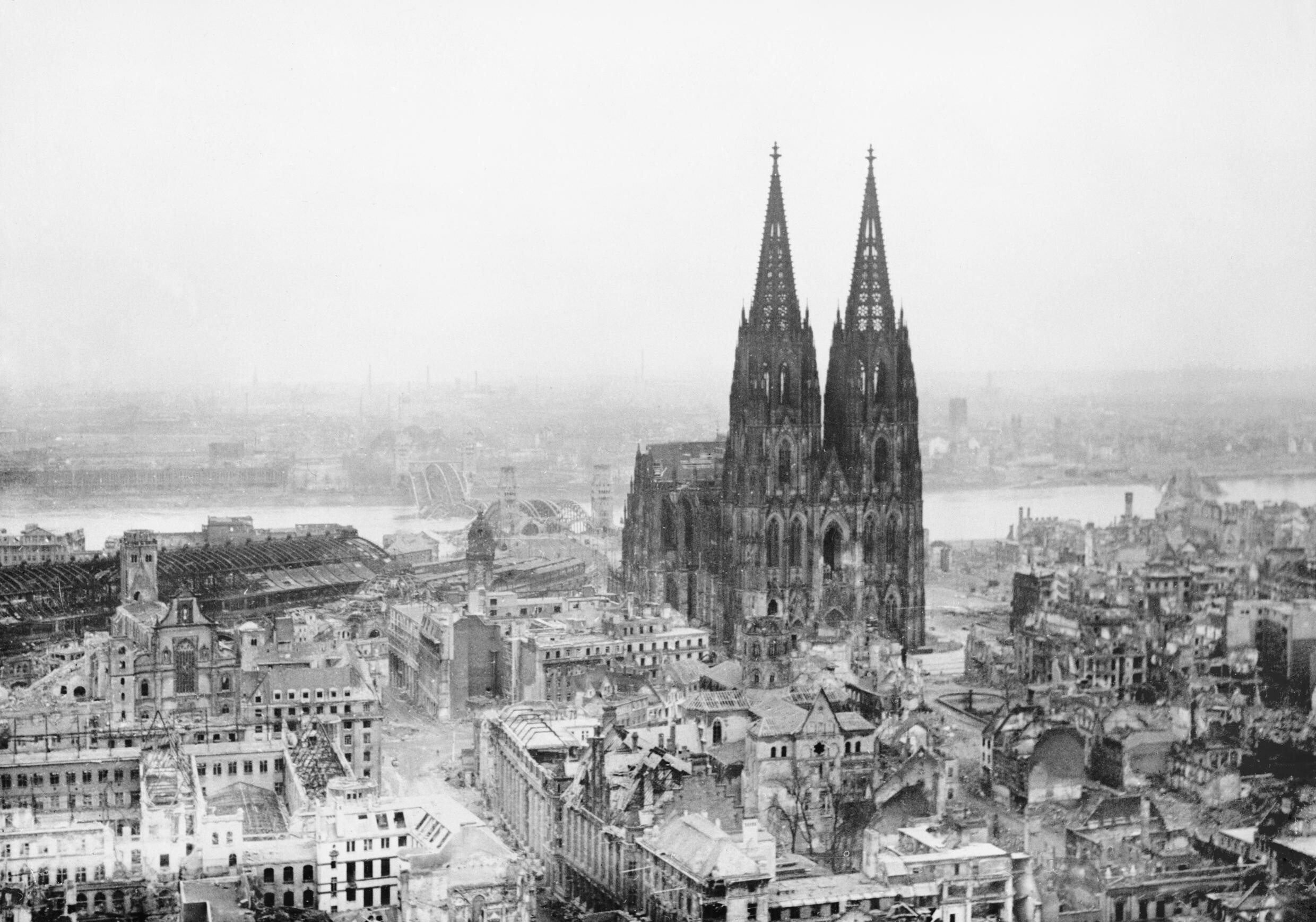
The cathedral amidst the destruction caused by Allied air raids, 9 March 1945

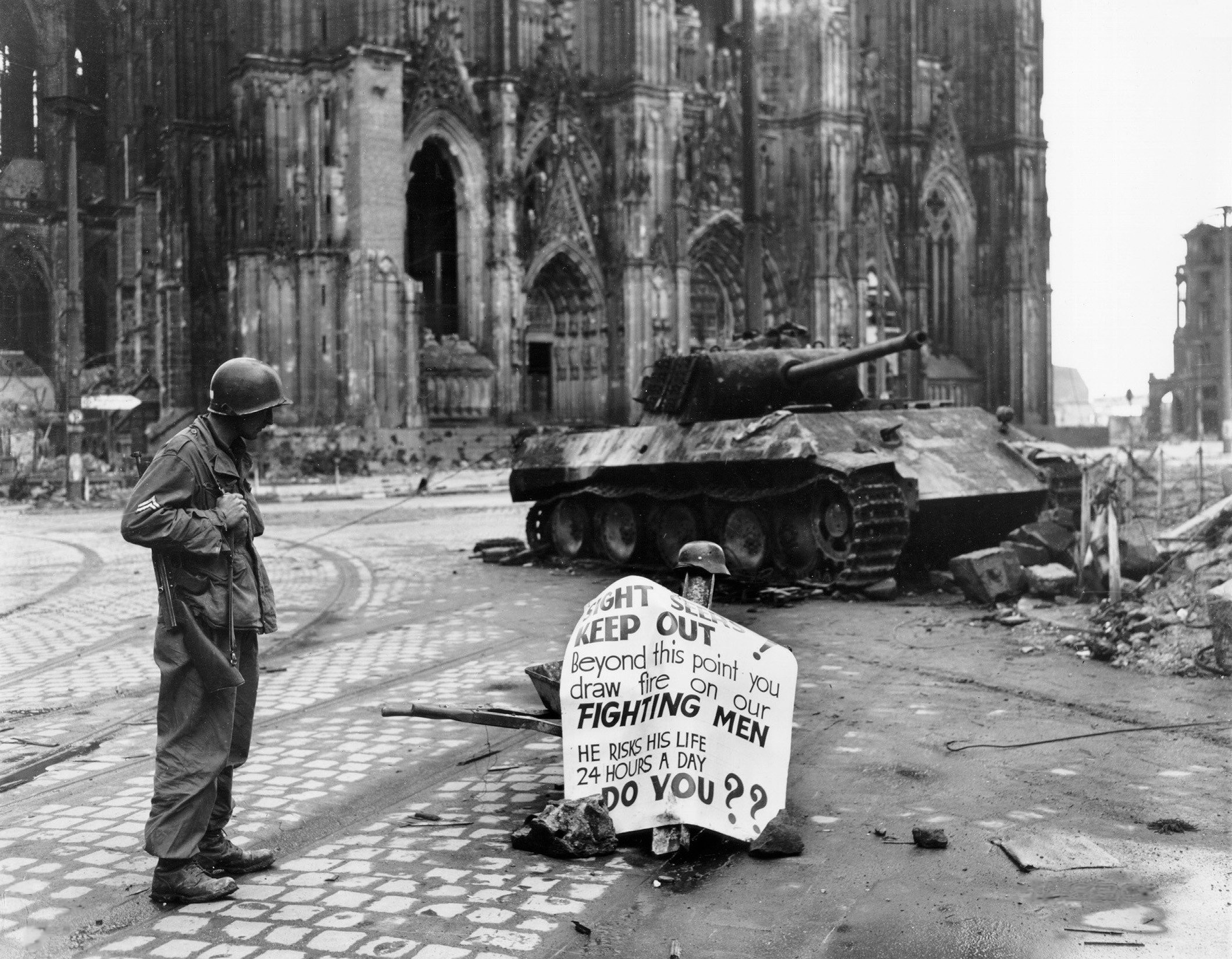
US soldier and destroyed Panther tank, 4 April 1945

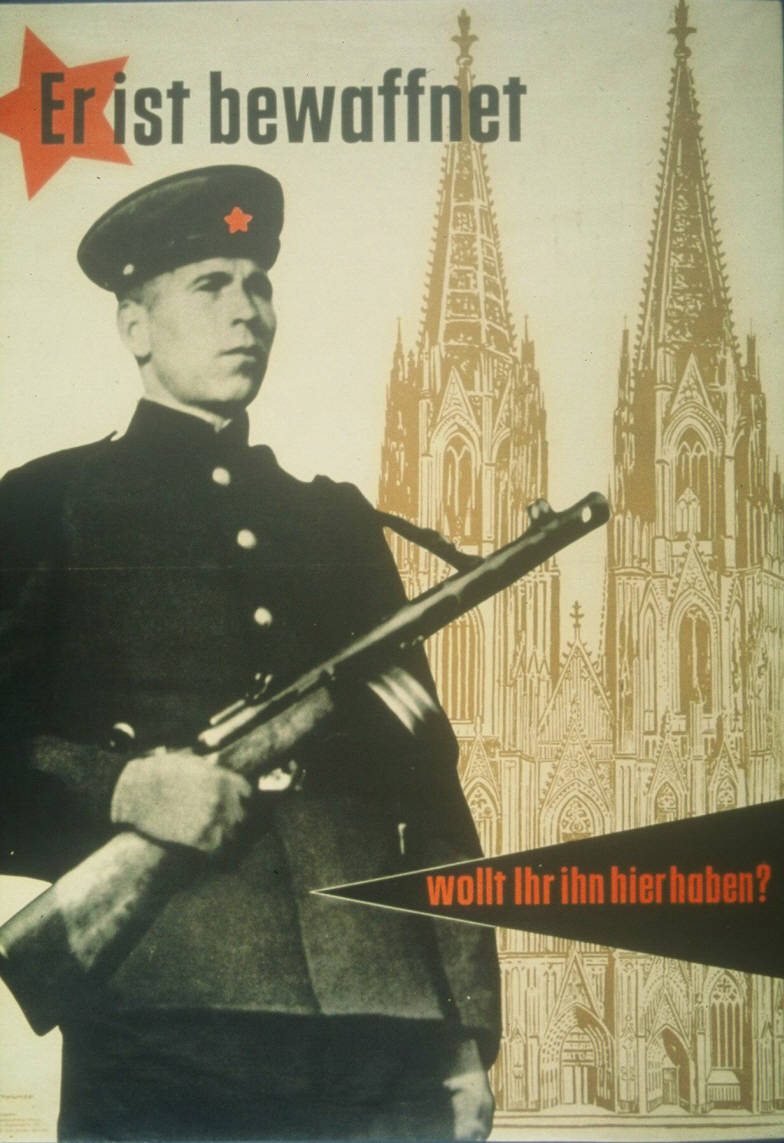
"He is armed", "Do you want him here?", Anti-Soviet propaganda poster, 1953

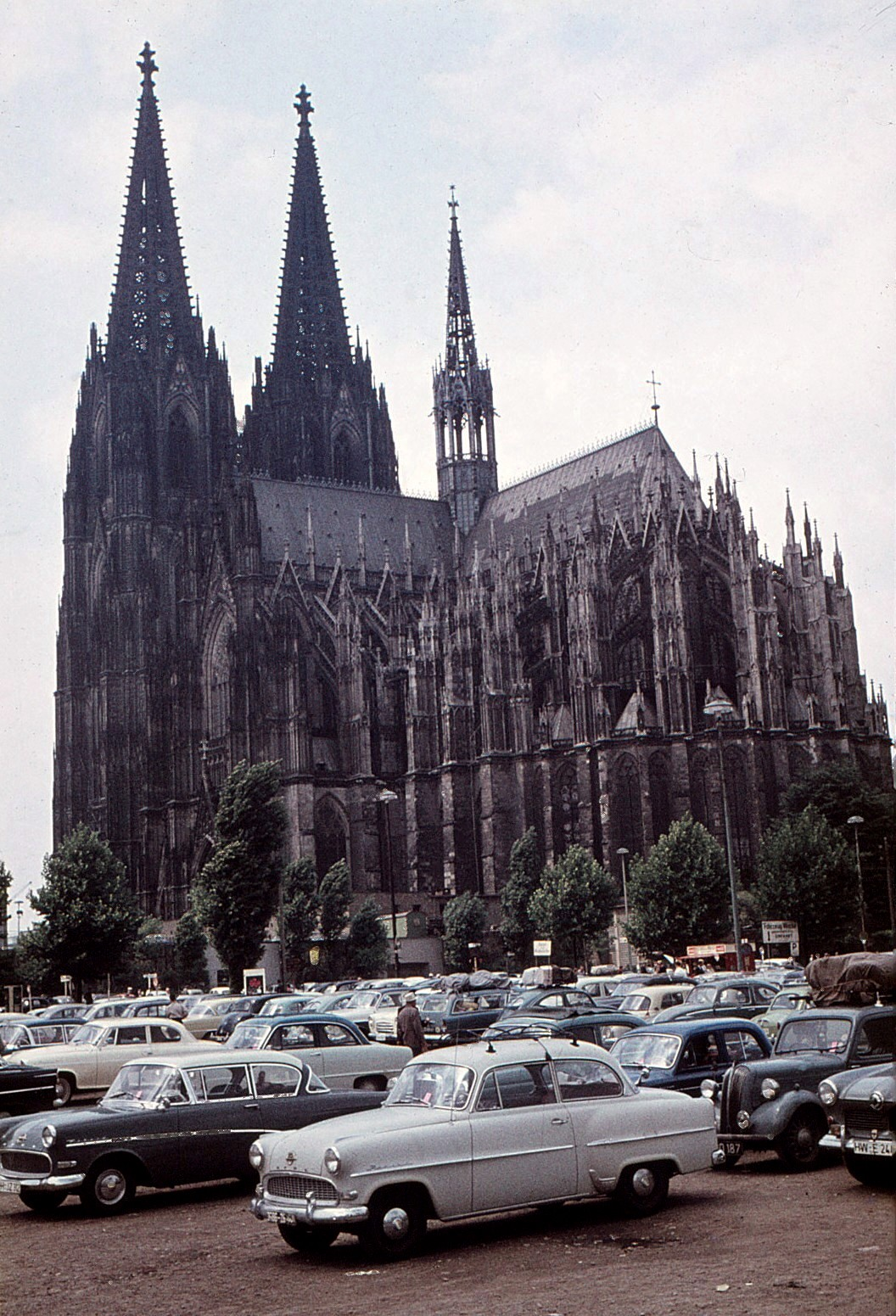
The cathedral as it appeared in the 1960s, showing the war-damaged crossing tower

=== 21st century ===
On 18 August 2005, Pope Benedict XVI visited the cathedral during his apostolic visit to Germany, as part of World Youth Day 2005 festivities. An estimated one million pilgrims visited the cathedral during this time. Also as part of the events of World Youth Day, Cologne Cathedral hosted a televised gala performance of Beethoven's Missa Solemnis, performed by the Royal Philharmonic Orchestra and the London Philharmonic Choir conducted by Gilbert Levine.

On 25 August 2007, the cathedral received a new stained glass window in the south transept. The 113 m^{2} (1,220 sq ft) glass work was created by the German artist Gerhard Richter with the €400,000 cost paid by donations. It is composed of 11,500 identically sized pieces of coloured glass resembling pixels, randomly arranged by computer, which create a colourful "carpet". Since the loss of the original window in World War II, the space had been temporarily filled with plain glass. The then archbishop of the cathedral, Cardinal Joachim Meisner, who had preferred a figurative depiction of 20th-century Catholic martyrs for the window, did not attend the unveiling. Holder of the office since 2014 is Cardinal Rainer Maria Woelki. On 5 January 2015, the cathedral remained dark as floodlights were switched off to protest a demonstration by PEGIDA.

==== Antisemitic and Jewish-Christian art ====
In the 2000s, the cathedral chapter began to investigate and critique antisemitic imagery within some of the cathedral's artifacts. This movement began with outside artists who publicly called for the cathedral to reckon with its antisemitic imagery. In 2002, the Melanchthon Akademie held a conference on this topic, and the performance artist Wolfram Kastner specifically protested the Judensau imagery carved into the cathedral's choir stalls. Kastner and fellow artist Günter Wangerin protested further over the next few years, demanding the installation of an educational sign for the carving, as well as the removal of stone swastika carvings. In 2006, the Karl Rahner Academie and cathedral administration held a colloquium to discuss potential actions, and in 2017 the cathedral chapter created a working group in partnership with the Cologne Society for Christian-Jewish Cooperation. The translated title of the cathedral's working group is "The Cathedral and 'the Jews'."

As of 2024, the working group opted to leave all the antisemitic art in place, not removing or modifying it, but also not hiding it. The stated intention behind this choice was to allow interested viewers to learn more about the antisemitic content of the art by viewing it in its original place and having the ability to inspect it closely. The cathedral offers dedicated guided tours for studying and critiquing these artifacts. However, members of the working group wanted all of the cathedral's visitors, not just a highly-motivated subset, to consider how the cathedral's art portrays Jewish-Christian relationships. The working group decided to challenge existing antisemitic artwork by adding prominent new art to the cathedral. In August 2023, the working group launched the Cologne Cathedral International Art Competition, calling for a new permanent artwork that openly acknowledged the full history of Jewish-Christian relations while focusing on their present and future. The competition rejected seven nominated artists because they had signed open letters criticizing Israel's actions in Gaza or calling for boycotts. This echoed a broader debate in Germany over how cultural institutions should handle artists' response to the conflict, and the balance between enabling artists' speech and combating antisemitism.

On 3 April 2025, the cathedral chapter announced that Andrea Büttner had won the Cologne Cathedral International Art Competition, with her proposed mural for the wall of the Chapel of St. Mary. Her mural will include a life-size realistic painting of the stone base of the Torah ark from a previous synagogue in Cologne, painted to float above the existing Altarpiece of the Patron Saints of Cologne. The art is designed to counter the overwriting of Jewish history: after a pogrom in Cologne, the Torah ark was damaged and removed, its synagogue replaced with a chapel, and the base of the ark was used to support the Altarpiece of the Patron Saints of Cologne where it originally sat in the new chapel. Büttner stated that she wanted her piece to "take something that has been hidden from the cathedral's visitors up to now and have it openly displayed in a central location."

=== World Heritage Site ===
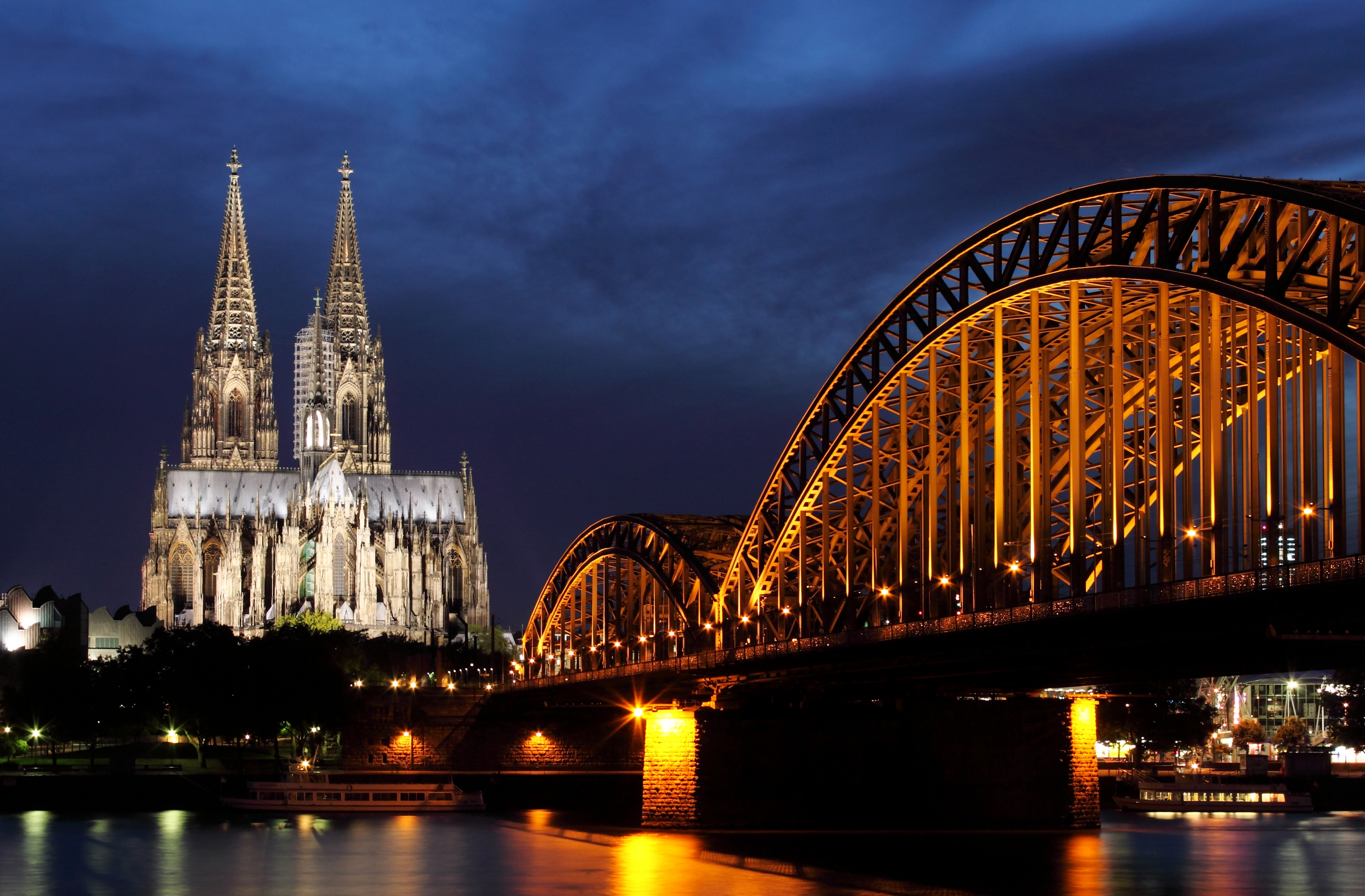
Cologne Cathedral on the banks of Rhine

In 1996, the cathedral was added to the UNESCO World Heritage List of culturally important sites. In 2004, it was placed on the "World Heritage in Danger" list, as the only Western site in danger, due to plans to construct several high-rise buildings nearby, which would have visually impacted the site. The cathedral was removed from the "in danger" list in 2006, following the authorities' decision to limit the heights of buildings constructed near and around the cathedral.

As a World Heritage Site and host to the Shrine of the Three Kings, Cologne Cathedral is a major attraction for tourists and pilgrims, and is one of the oldest and most important pilgrimage sites of Northern Europe. Visitors can climb 533 stone steps of the spiral staircase to a viewing platform about 100 m (330 ft) above the ground. The platform gives a scenic view over the Rhine.

== Ongoing renovation ==
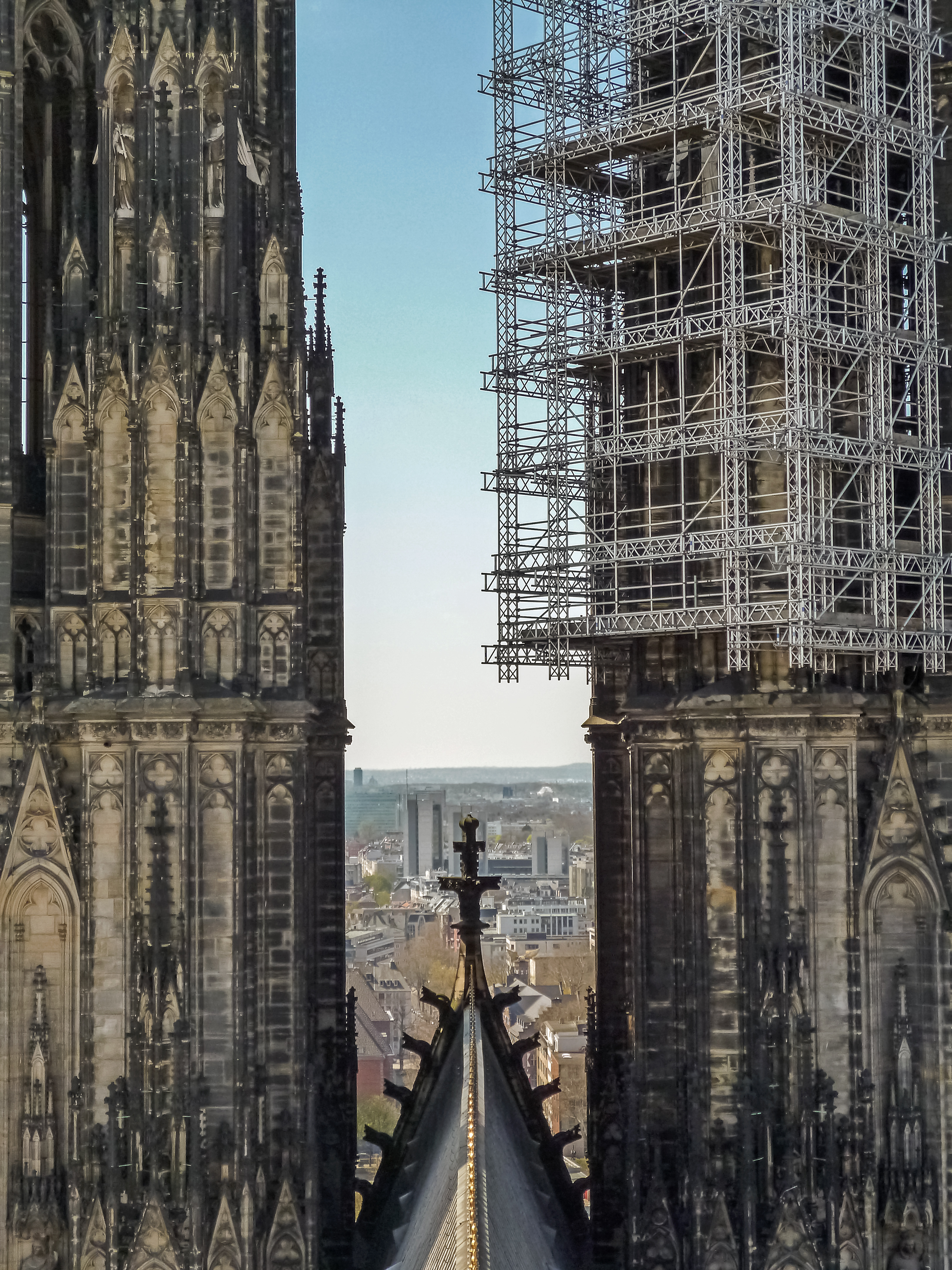
Never without steel net: the stones on the cathedral require constant renewal

The cathedral is a medieval building that was built very solidly from a structural point of view. At the same time, however, the stone structure requires continuous maintenance and renovation. The cathedral's master builder Barbara Schock-Werner said: "Cologne Cathedral without scaffolding is not a pipe dream, but a nightmare. It would mean that we would no longer be able to afford the cathedral."

In fact, the completed cathedral was only visible without scaffolding for a few years. After the official completion of the cathedral in 1880, finishing work continued for around 20 years. Shortly before his death in 1902, master builder Richard Voigtel publicly stated that the cathedral had finally been completed. However, after the wings of an angel figure fell from the façade in 1906, the cathedral master builders resumed the renovation work.

The cathedral is built from different types of rock, which weather to varying degrees due to their characteristics. The filigree buttresses and arches are exposed to the weather from all sides and are attacked by water, the sulphur content of the air and bird droppings. Especially from the 1960s onwards, acid rain severely affected the stones and turned them increasingly black. It was only from the 1990s onwards that air pollution control measures reduced the level of pollution.

The sandstone, which was used from 1842 onwards for the transept façades and the upper parts of the nave and transept, shows the most intensive weathering. It is therefore constantly being renewed and until the 1980s was preferably replaced with Londorf basalt lava, which is considered to be very weather-resistant, but is not sandy beige, but grey in color. Since the 1990s, however, the cathedral master builders have endeavored to carry out the restoration with stones that come as close as possible to the original sandstone. The cathedral works (Dombauhütte) has already tested numerous means of preserving the stones. A convincing method has not yet been found. In addition, the iron anchors and dowels that hold the many parts of the architectural decoration are also beginning to rust. They are threatening to crack the stones and need to be replaced with steel parts. "It is therefore foreseeable that no one alive today will ever see the cathedral without scaffolding."

Regular renovation work is required due to sporadic earthquake damage. For example, during the 1992 Roermond earthquake, the 400 kilograms (880 lb) finial on the eastern pinnacle of the southern transept gable broke off, smashed through the roof and damaged the roof truss. Four other finials were loosened.

From May to November 2021, an airplane took 200,000 high-resolution photos of all parts of the façade from a distance of 5 to 7 metres (16 to 23 ft) and assembled them into a digital 3D model of the cathedral, which offers a very accurate representation with 25 billion polygons. This makes it possible to precisely document the current condition and the need for conservation and restoration, even in remote areas. The 3D model has a size of 50 gigabytes. The cost of creating the model was in the six-figure range.

In March 2026, the cathedral's management announced that it would begin charging admission for tourists in the second half of the year to support maintenance expenses.

== Architecture ==
The ground plan design of Cologne Cathedral was based closely on that of Amiens Cathedral, as is the style and the width to height proportion of the central nave. The plan is in the shape of a Latin Cross, as is usual with Gothic cathedrals. It has two aisles on either side, which help support one of the very highest Gothic vaults in the world, being nearly as tall as that of the Beauvais Cathedral, much of which was never built or had collapsed. Externally the outward thrust of the vault is taken by flying buttresses in the French manner. The eastern end has a single ambulatory, the second aisle resolving into a chevet of seven radiating chapels.

Internally, the medieval choir is more varied and less mechanical in its details than the 19th-century building. It presents a French style arrangement of very tall arcade, a delicate narrow triforium gallery lit by windows and with detailed tracery merging with that of the windows above. The clerestory windows are tall and retain some old figurative glass in the lower sections. The whole is united by the tall shafts that sweep unbroken from the floor to their capitals at the spring of the vault. The vault is of plain quadripartite arrangement.

The choir retains a great many of its original fittings, including the carved stalls, despite French Revolutionary troops having desecrated the building. A large stone statue of St Christopher looks down towards the place where the earlier entrance to the cathedral was, before its completion in the late 19th century.

The nave has many 19th century stained glass windows. A set of five on the south side, called the Bayernfenster, were a gift from Ludwig I of Bavaria, and strongly represent the painterly German style of the time.

Externally, particularly from a distance, the building is dominated by its huge spires, which are entirely Germanic in character, being openwork like those of Ulm, Vienna, Strasbourg and Regensburg Cathedrals.

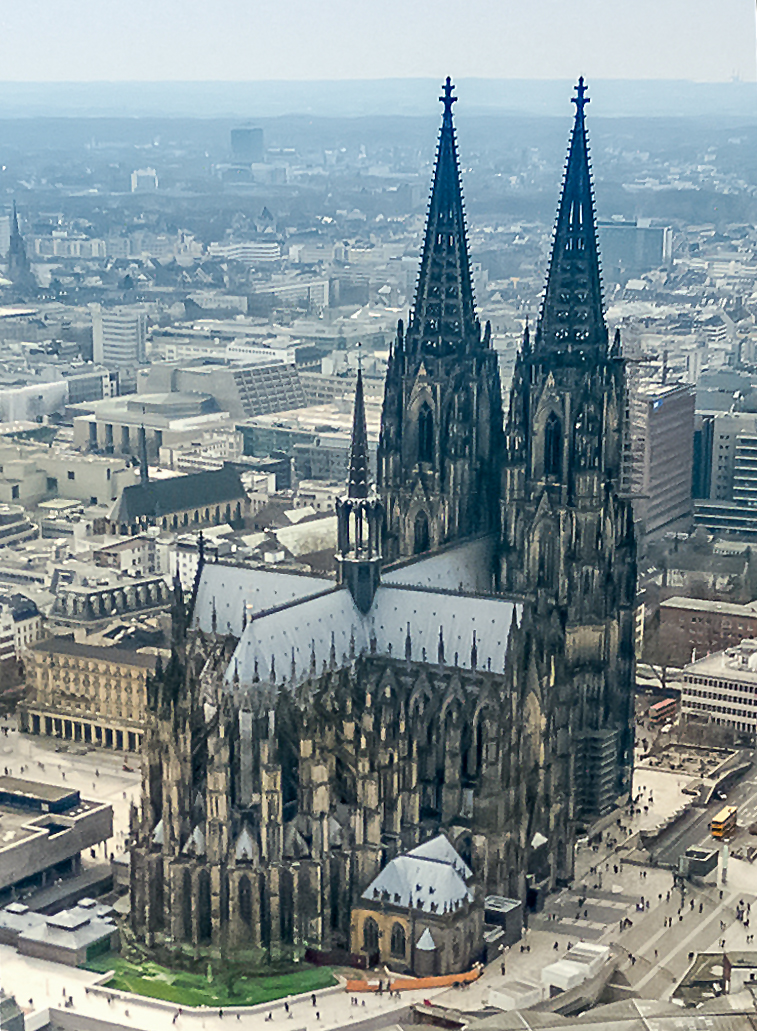
An aerial view shows the cruciform plan.

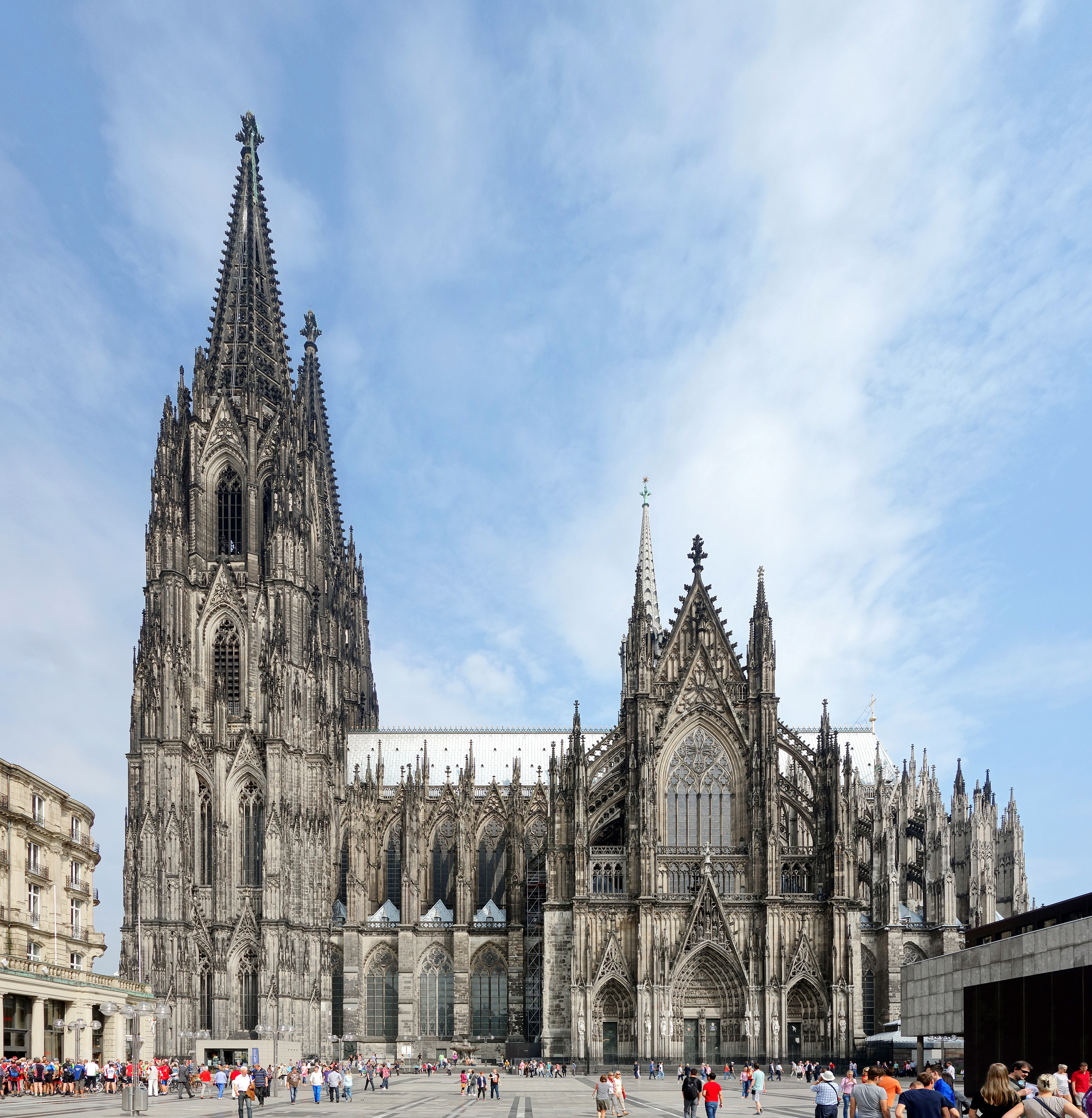
The cathedral from the south

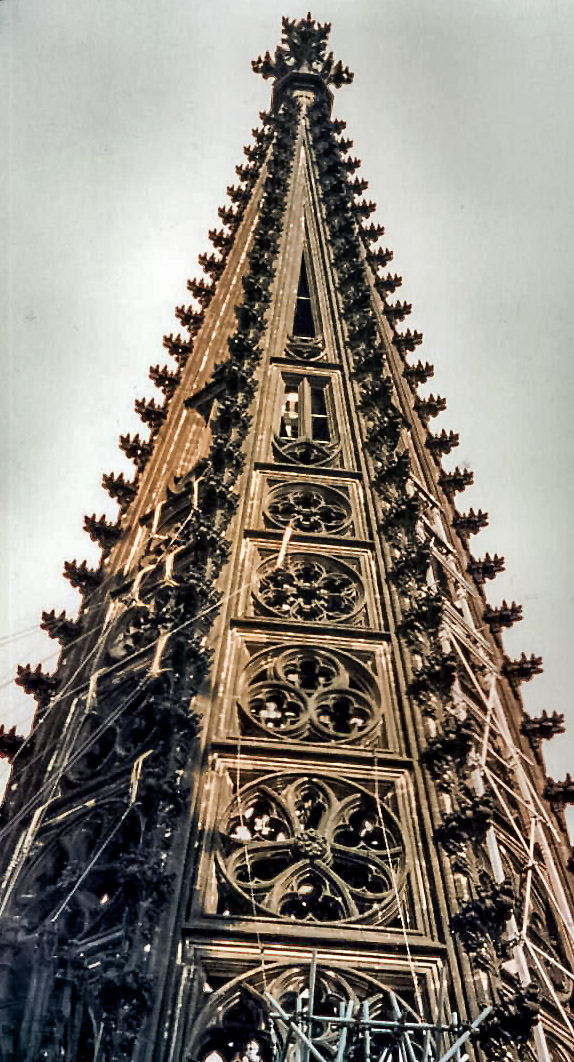
The exterior of one of the spires

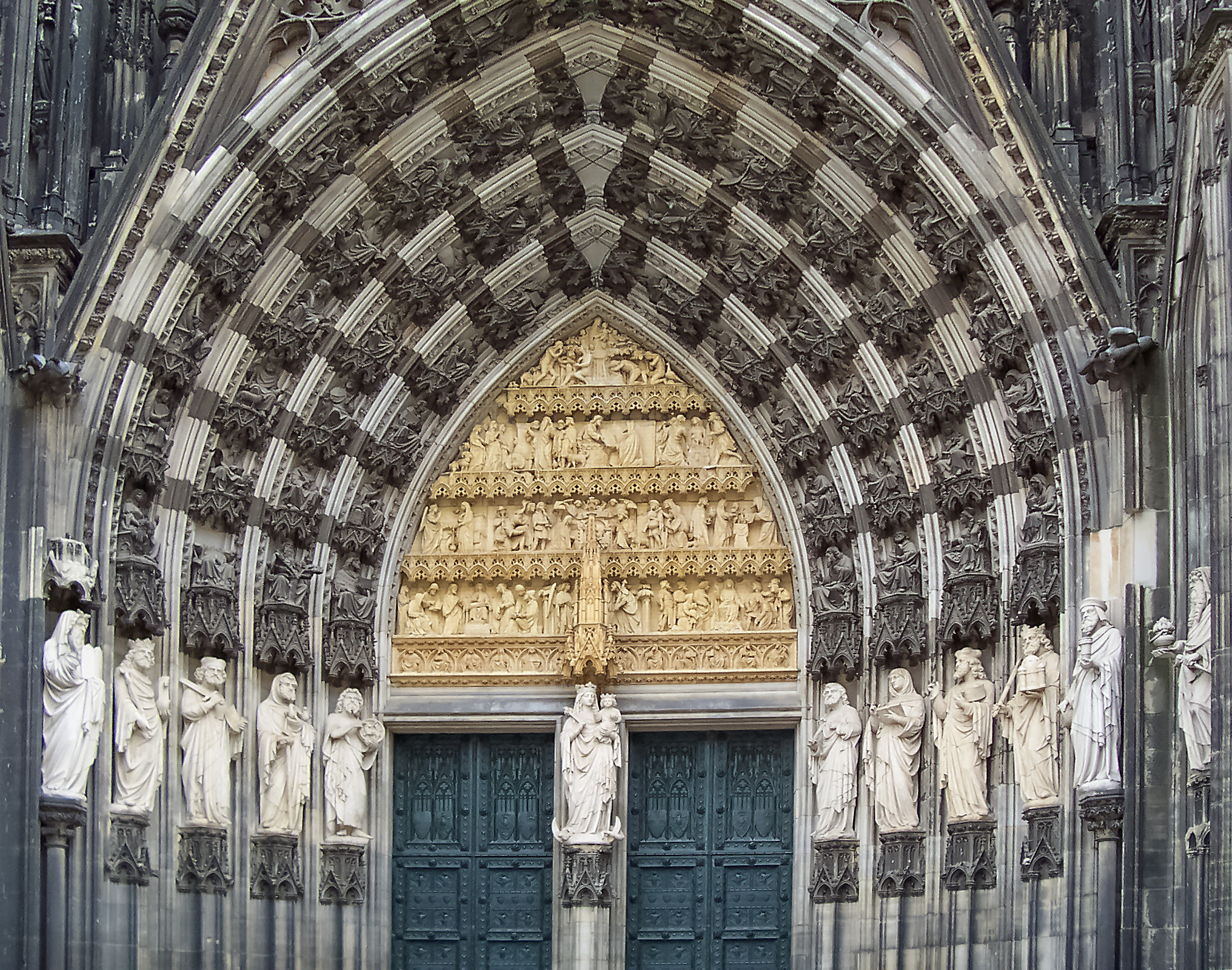
The main entrance shows the 19th century decoration.
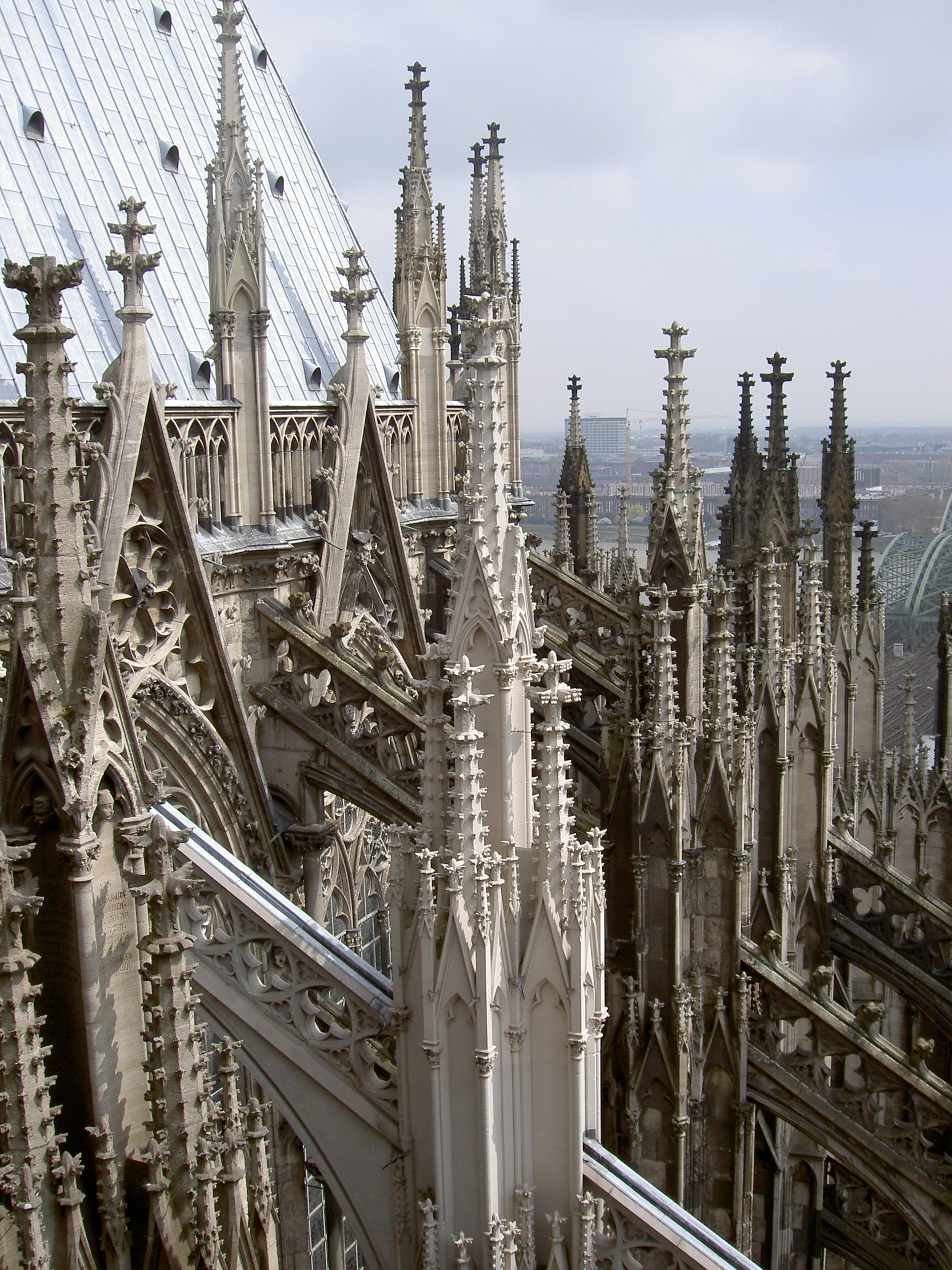
The flying buttresses and pinnacles of the Medieval east end

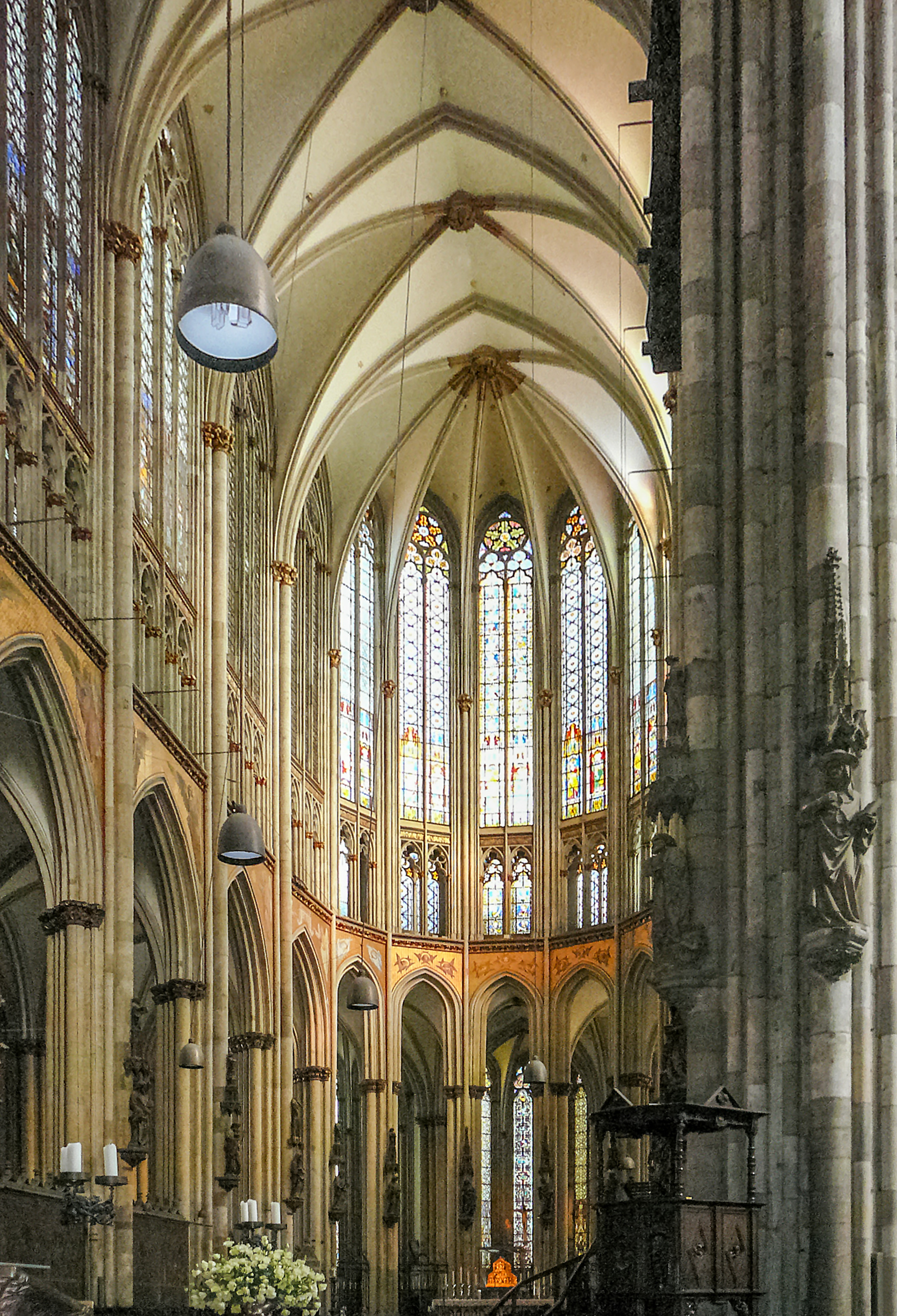
Interior of the Medieval east end, showing the extreme height

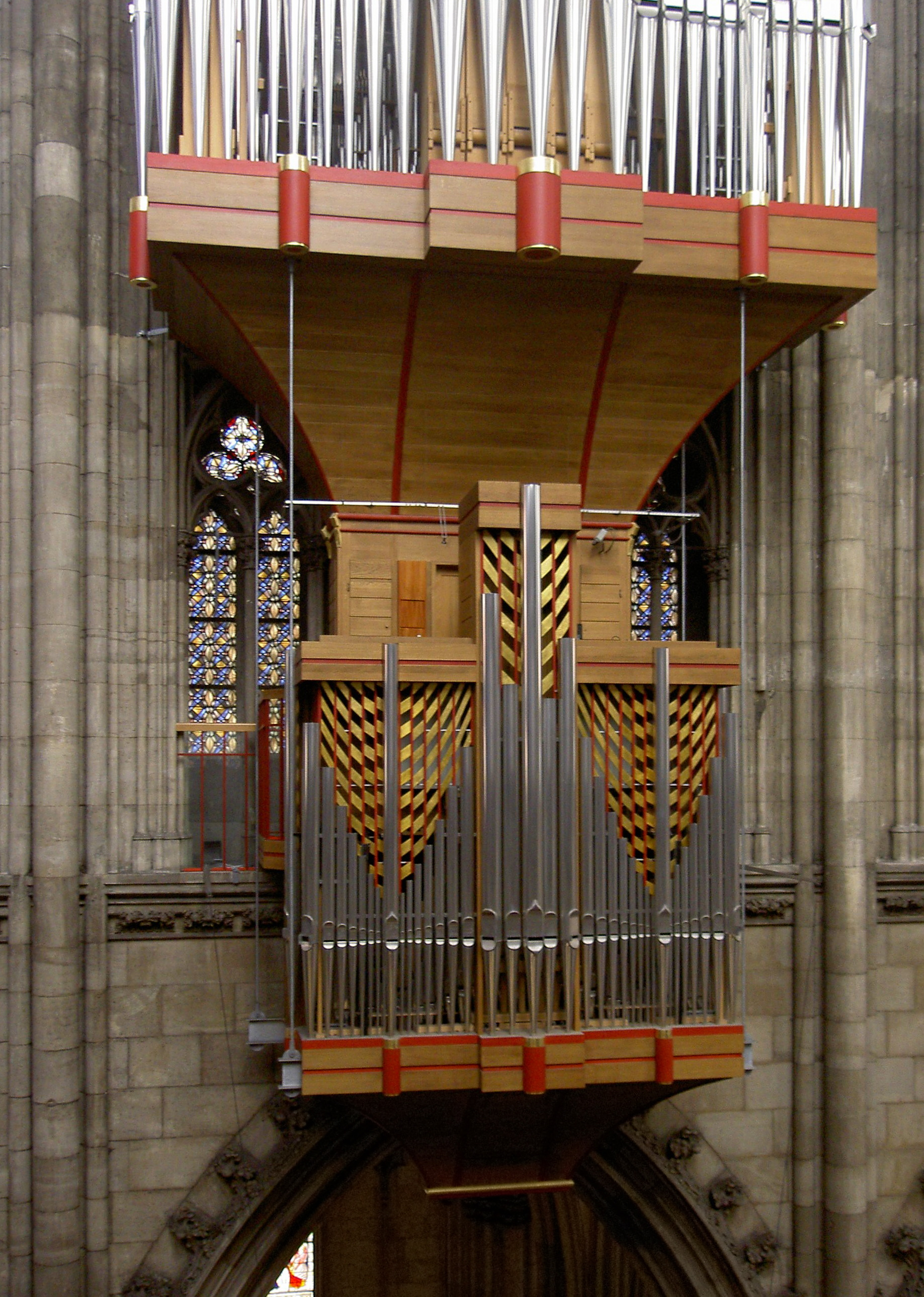
This "swallows' nest" organ was built into the arcade in 1998 to celebrate the cathedral's 750 years.

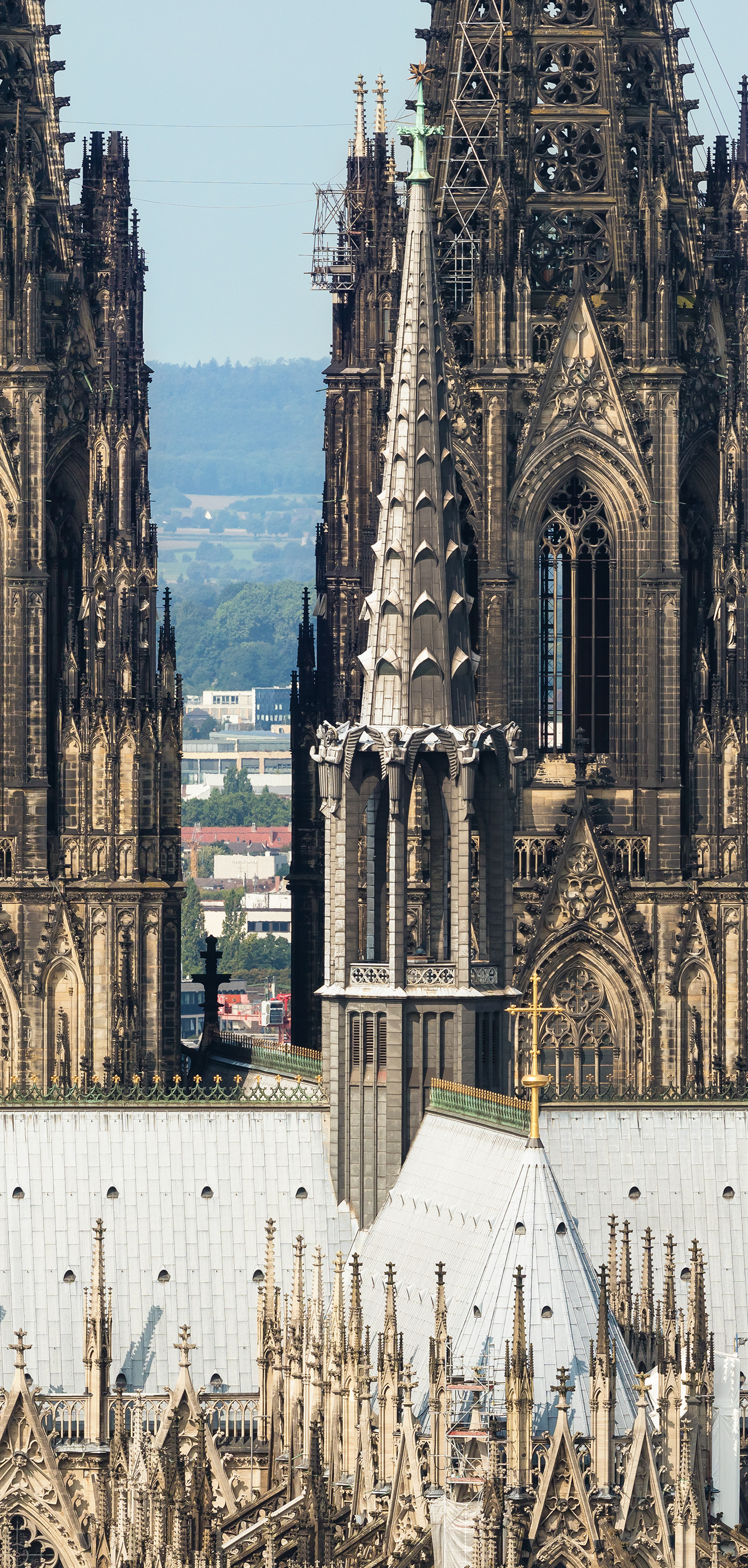
The crossing tower, which was completed in 1973 following war damage

== Dimensions ==
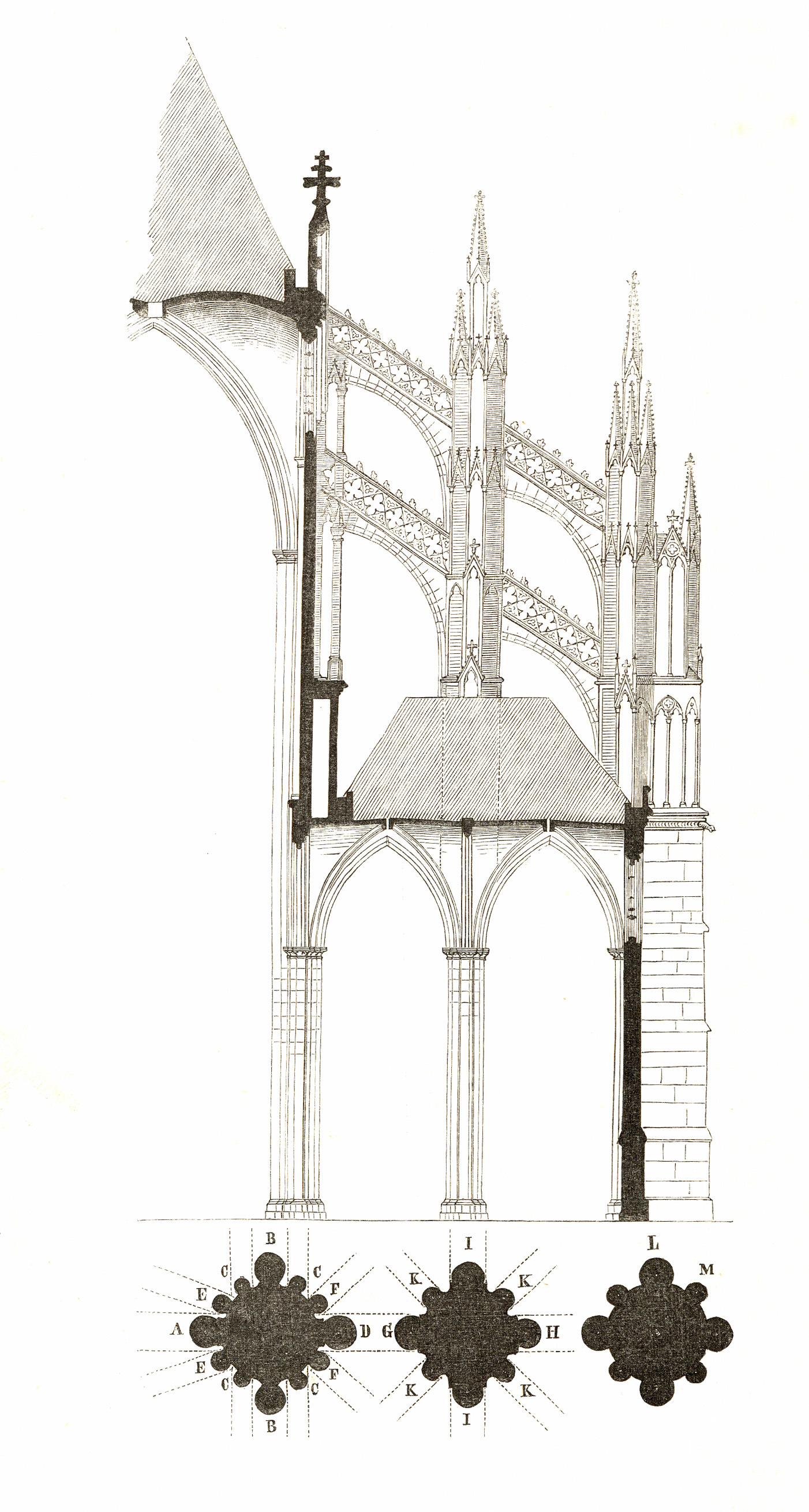
19th century cross-section, south elevation of the choir

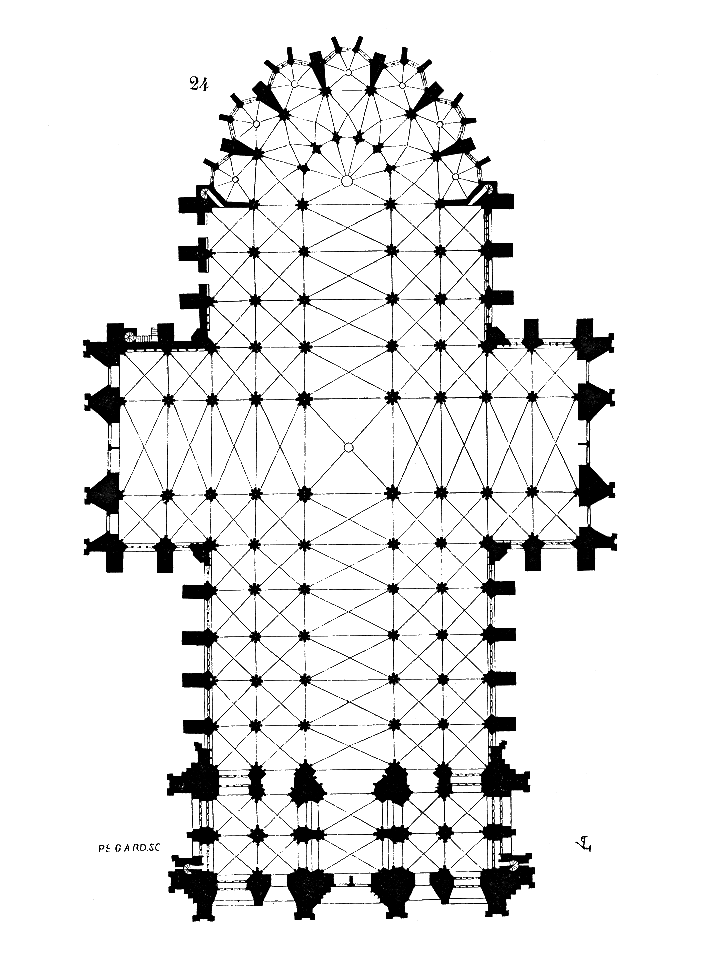
Groundplan

External length	144.58 m (474.3 ft)
External width	86.25 m (283.0 ft)
Width of west façade	61.54 m (201.9 ft)
Width of transept façade	39.95 m (131.1 ft)
Width of nave (with aisles, interior)	45.19 m (148.3 ft)
Height of southern tower	157.31 m (516.1 ft)
Height of northern tower	157.38 m (516.3 ft)
Height of ridge turret	109.00 m (357.61 ft)
Height of transept façades	69.95 m (229.5 ft)
Height of roof ridge	61.10 m (200.5 ft)
Inner height of nave	43.35 m (142.2 ft)
Height of side aisles	18 m (59 ft)
Building area	7,914 m^{2} (85,185.59 sq ft)
Window surface area	10,000 m^{2} (107,639.10 sq ft)
Roof surface area	12,000 m^{2} (129,166.93 sq ft)
Gross volume without buttresses	407,000 m^{3} (14,400,000 cu ft)

== Treasures ==
One of the treasures of the cathedral is the high altar, which was installed in 1322. It is constructed of black marble, with a solid slab 15 ft (4.6 m) long forming the top. The front and sides are overlaid with white marble niches into which are set figures, with the Coronation of the Virgin at the centre. Joan Holladay has discussed the iconography of the high altar in the cathedral.

The most celebrated work of art in the cathedral is the Shrine of the Three Kings, commissioned by Philip von Heinsberg, archbishop of Cologne from 1167 to 1191 and created by Nicholas of Verdun, begun in 1190. It is believed to hold the remains of the Three Wise Men, whose relics were acquired by Frederick Barbarossa at the conquest of Milan in 1164. The shrine takes the form of a large reliquary in the shape of a basilican church, made of bronze and silver, gilded and ornamented with architectonic details, figurative sculpture, enamels and gemstones. The shrine was opened in 1864 and was found to contain bones and garments.

Near the sacristy is the Gero Crucifix, a large crucifix carved in oak and with traces of paint and gilding. Believed to have been commissioned around 960 for Archbishop Gero, it is the oldest large crucifix north of the Alps and the earliest-known large free-standing Northern sculpture of the medieval period.

In the Sacrament Chapel is the Mailänder Madonna ('Milan Madonna'), a high Gothic carving, depicting the Blessed Virgin and the infant Jesus. It was made in the Cologne Cathedral workshop sometime around 1290 as a replacement for the original which was lost in a fire. The altar of the patron saints of Cologne with an altarpiece by the International Gothic painter Stefan Lochner is in the Marienkapelle ('St. Mary's Chapel').

After completion in 1265, the radiating chapels were immediately taken into service as a burial place. The relics of Saint Irmgardis found a final resting place in the St. Agnes' Chapel. Her trachyte sarcophagus is considered to be created by the cathedral masons' guild around 1280. Other works of art are in the Cathedral Treasury.

Embedded in the interior wall are a pair of stone tablets on which are carved the provisions formulated by Archbishop Englebert II (1262–67) under which Jews were permitted to reside in Cologne.

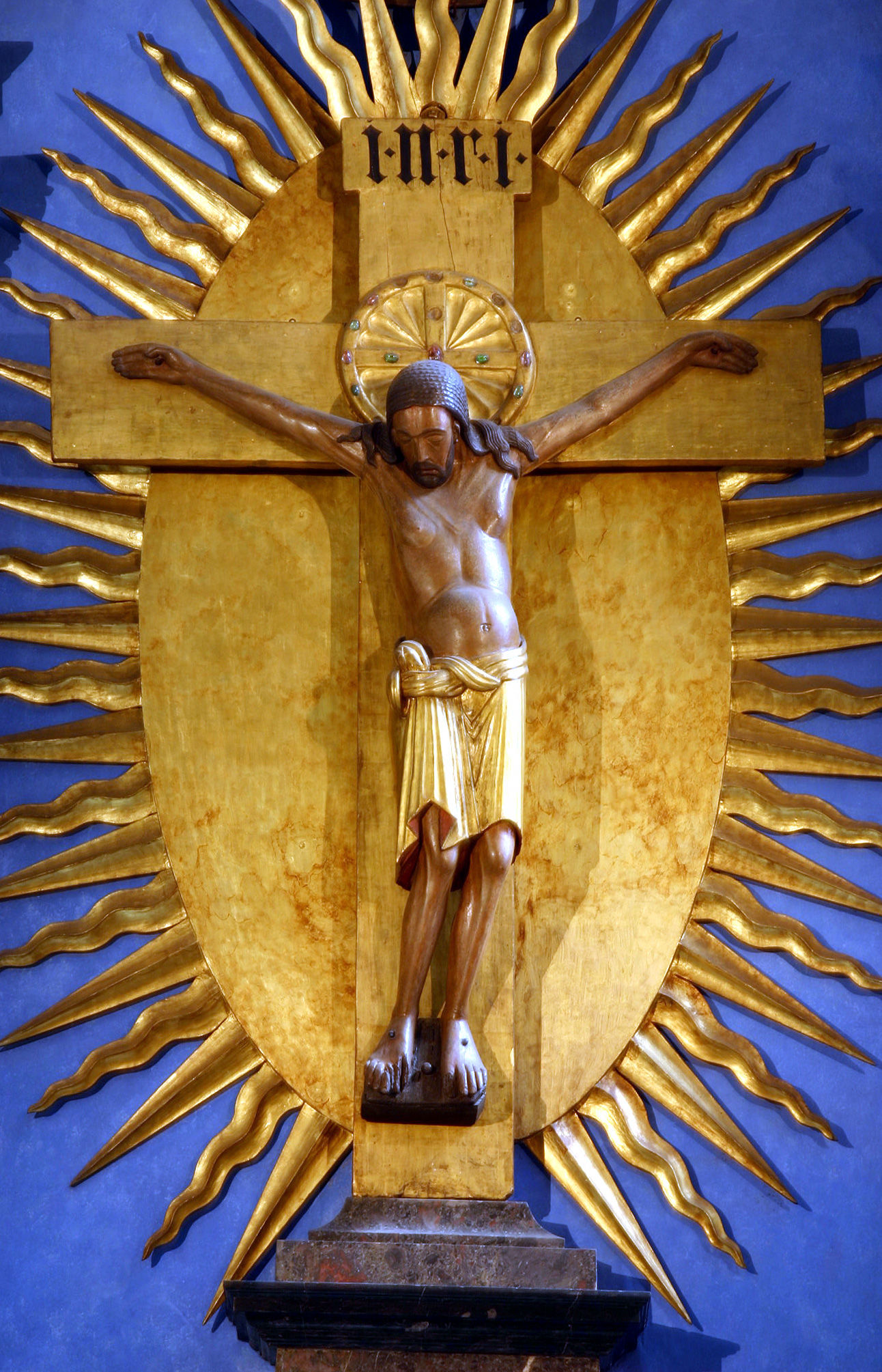
The Crucifix of Bishop Gero, 10th century, the oldest known large crucifix

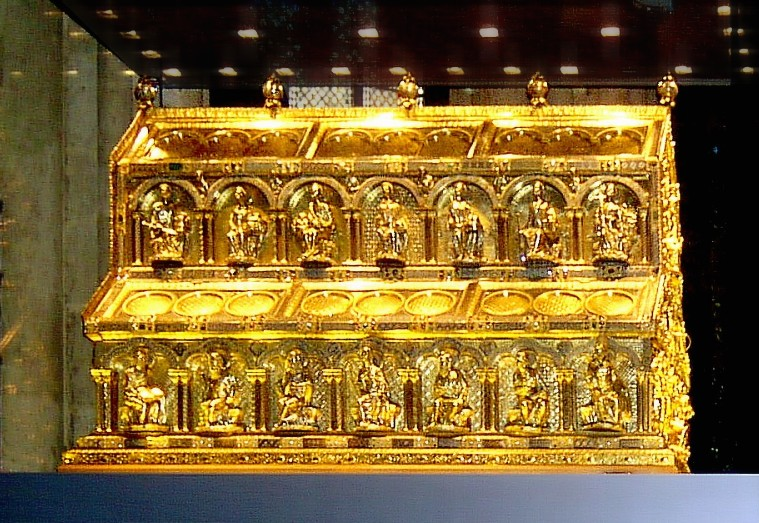
The Shrine of the Three Kings

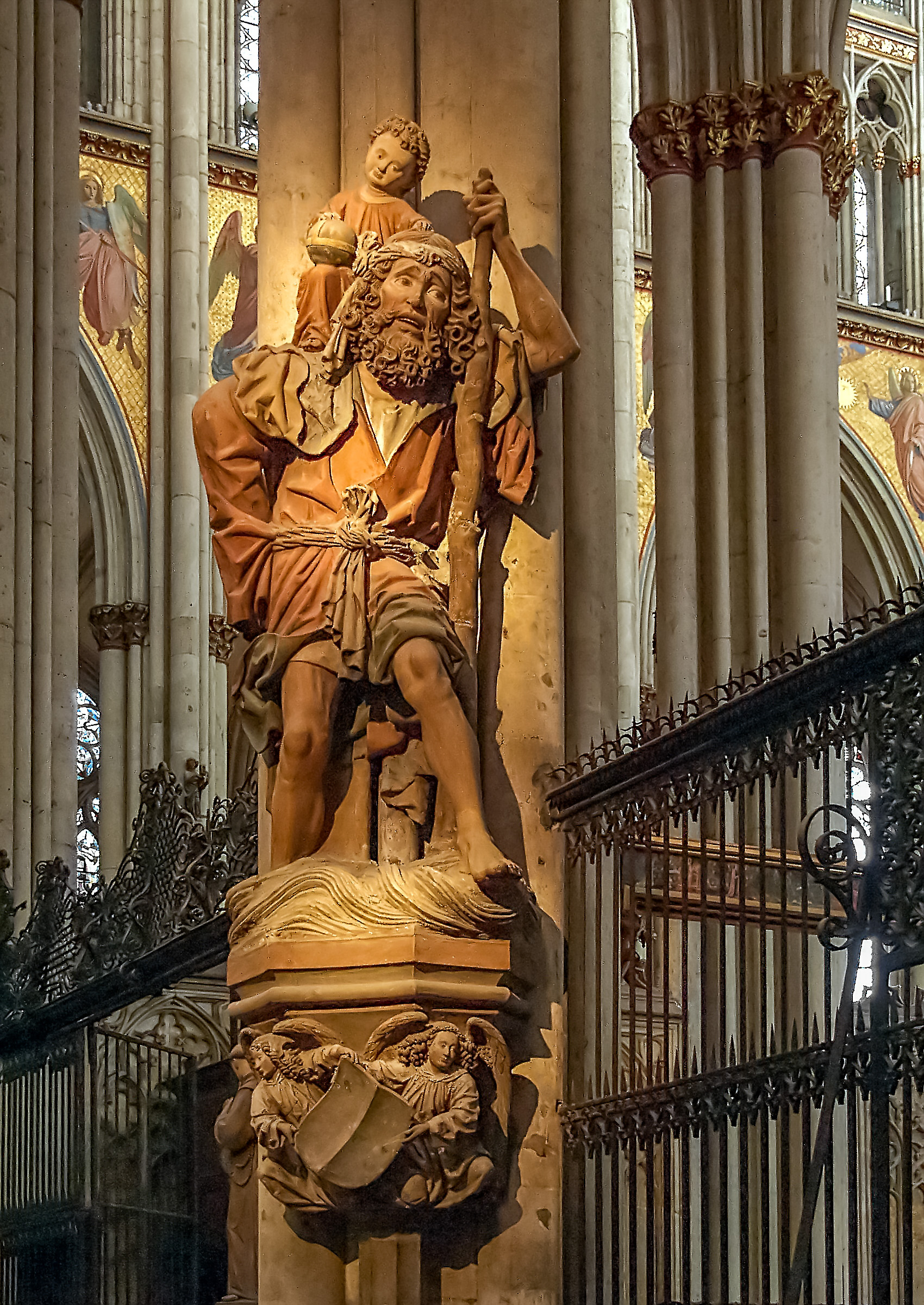
St. Christopher statue by Tilman van der Burch, c. 1470

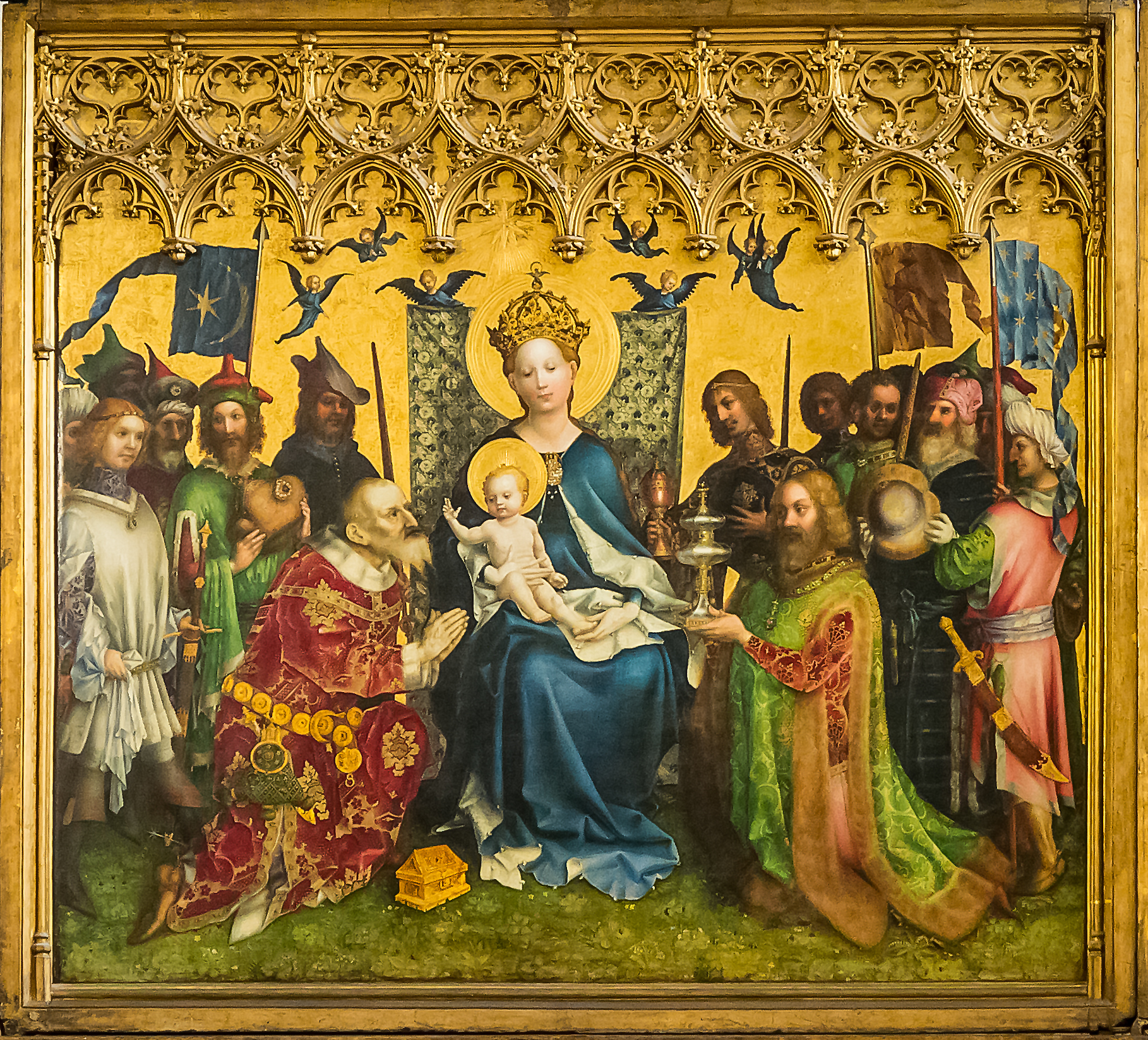
The Dombild Altarpiece of the Three Kings by Stefan Lochner
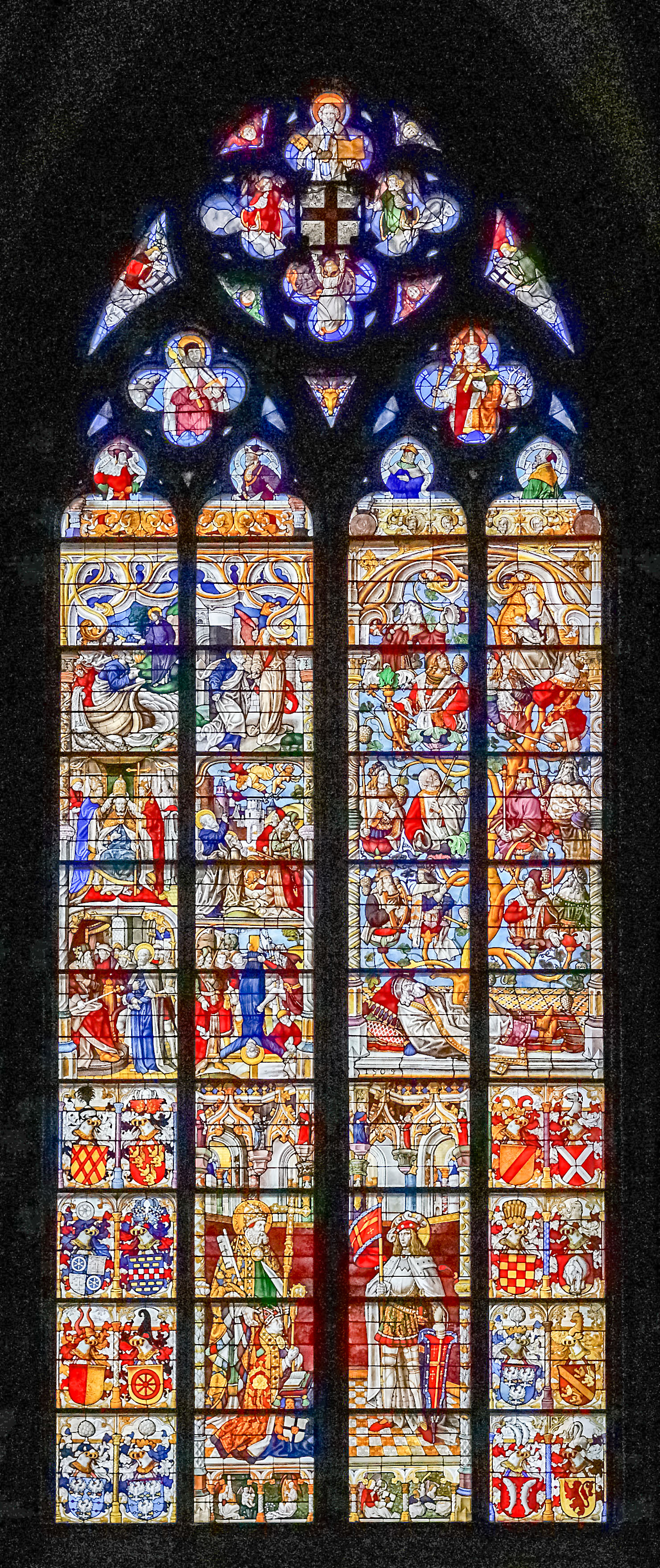
Petrus- und Wurzel Jesse-Fenster, 1509

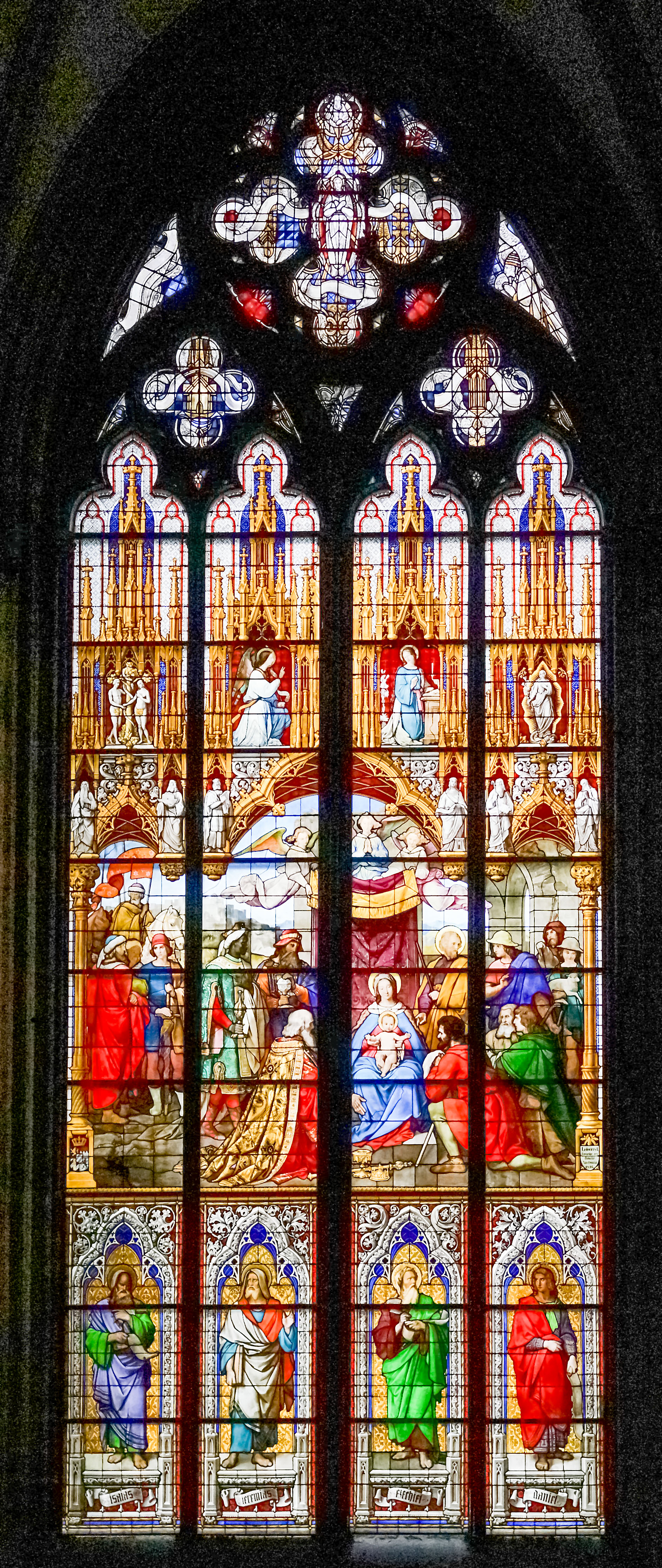
Anbetungs-Fenster, 1846

Modern stained glass window by Gerhard Richter (2007)

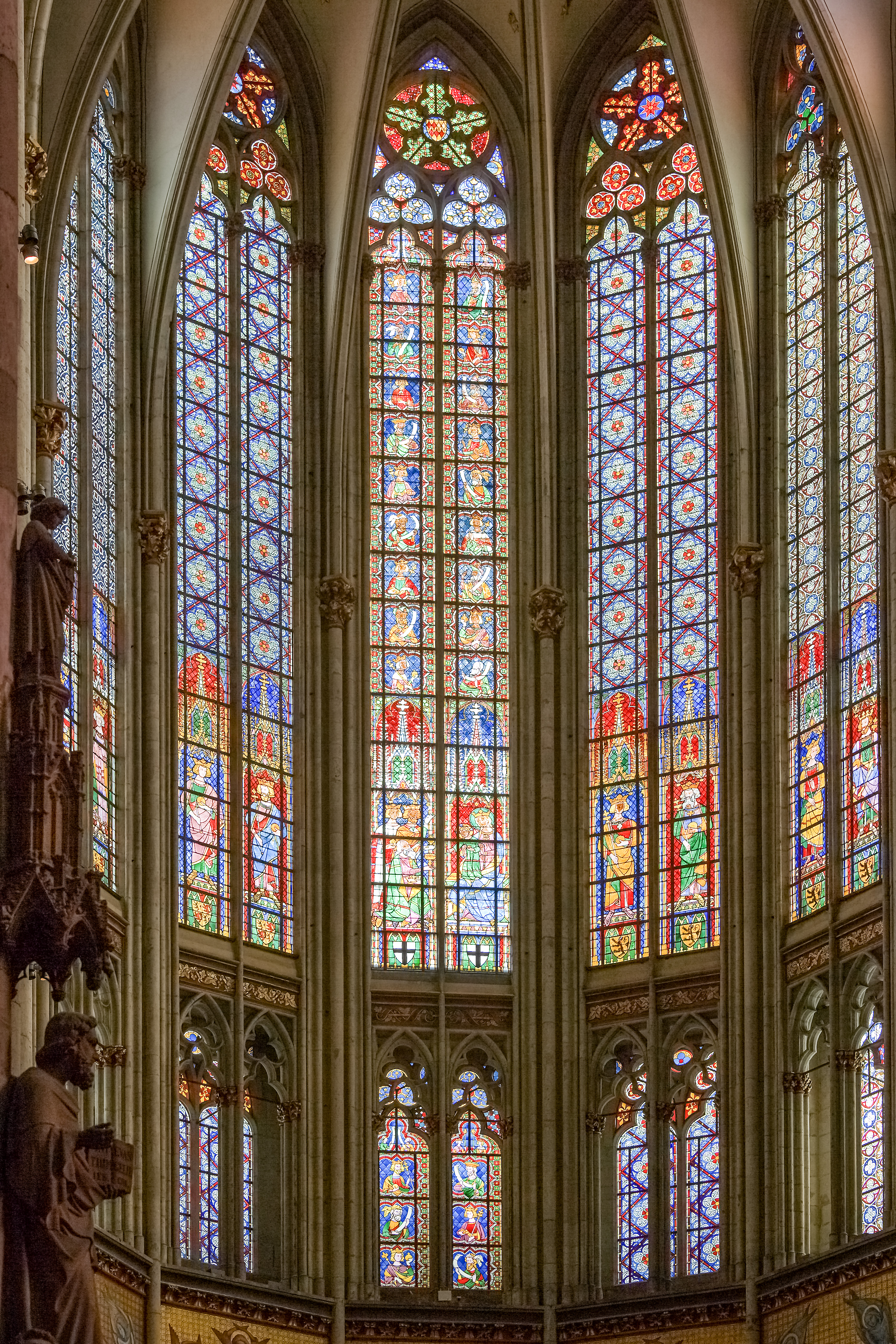

== Church music ==
=== Organs ===
Cologne Cathedral has two pipe organs by Klais Orgelbau: the Transept Organ, built in 1948, and the Nave Organ, built in 1998. Cathedral organists have included Josef Zimmermann, Clemens Ganz (1985–2001) and Winfried Bönig (2001).

=== Bells ===
The cathedral has eleven church bells, four of which are medieval, and the 3 largest bells are bourdon bells. The first was the 3.8-tonne (8,400 lb) Dreikönigsglocke ('Bell of the Three Kings'), cast in 1418, installed in 1437, and recast in 1880. Two of the other bells, the Pretiosa (10.5 tonnes or 23,000 pounds; at that time the largest bell in the Western world) and the Speciosa (5.6 tonnes or 12,000 pounds) were installed in 1448 and remain in place today.

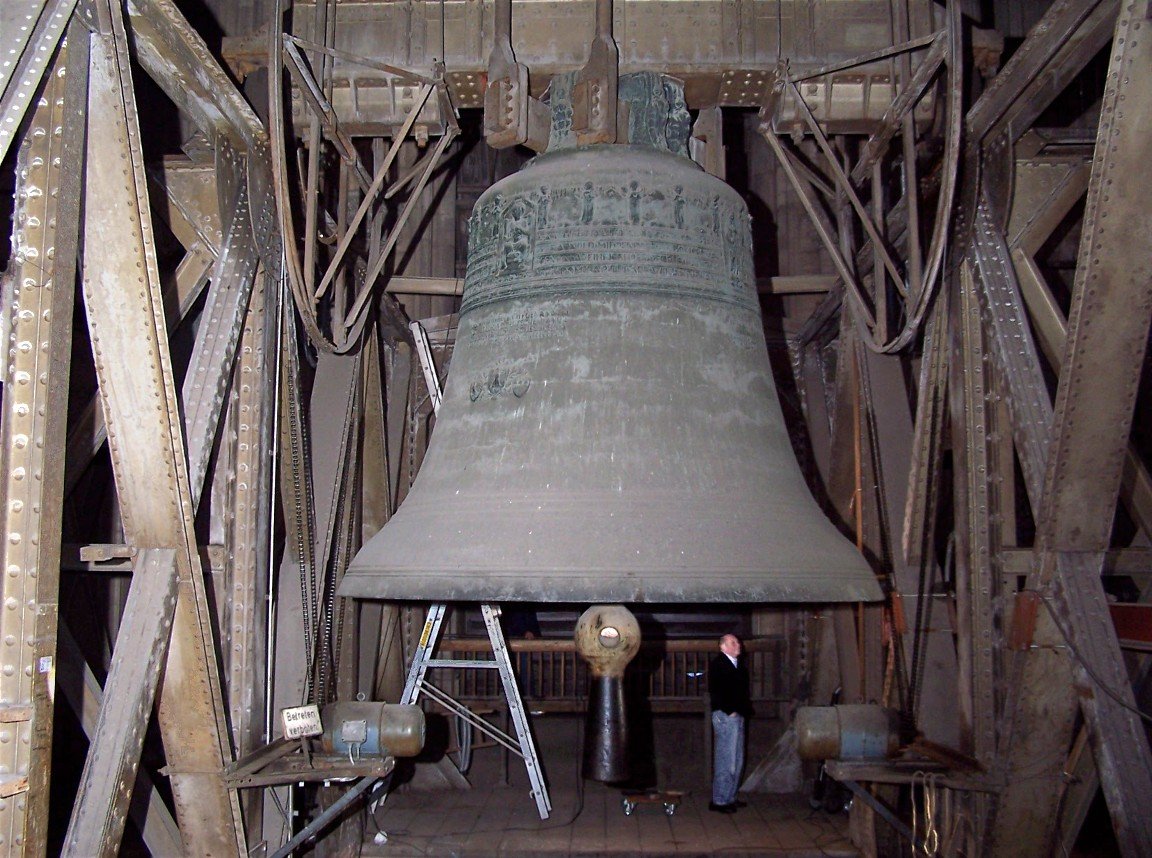
Petersglocke, with the old bell clapper standing to the right of the new bell clapper.

During the 19th century, as the building neared completion, there was a desire to increase the number of bells. This was facilitated by Kaiser Wilhelm I who gave French bronze cannon, captured in 1870–71, for this purpose. The 22 pieces of artillery were displayed outside the cathedral on 11 May 1872. Andreas Hamm in Frankenthal used them to cast a bell of over 27 tonnes (60,000 lb) on 19 August 1873. The tone was not harmonious and another attempt was made on 13 November 1873. The Central Cathedral Association, which had agreed to take over the costs, did not want this bell either. Another attempt took place on 3 October 1874. The colossal bell was shipped to Cologne and on 13 May 1875, installed in the cathedral. This Kaiserglocke was eventually melted in 1918 to support the German war effort. The Kaiserglocke was the largest free-swinging bell in history.

Sound of St. Petersglocke

The 24-tonne (53,000 lb) St. Petersglocke ('Bell of St. Peter', Decke Pitter in the Kölsch language or in common parlance known as Dicker Pitter), was cast in 1922 and was the largest free-swinging bell in the world, until a new bell was cast in 2016 in Innsbruck for the People's Salvation Cathedral in Bucharest, Romania. This bell is only rung on eight major holidays such as Easter and Christmas.

On Thursday, 3 March 2022, landmark cathedrals across Europe chimed in unison "in a gesture of solidarity with Ukraine, as bystanders gathered to mourn those killed during Russia's invasion and pray for peace." The Kölner Dom was among them.

Bells of the South Tower
Name	No	Mass	Note	Founder	Year
St. Peter's Bell (Dicker Pitter)	1	24,000 kg	C0	Heinrich Ulrich, Apolda	1923
Prétiosã	2	10,500 kg	G1	Heinrich Brodermann & Christian Cloit, Cologne	1448
Spéciosã	3	5,600 kg	A1	Johannes Hoerken de Vechel, Cologne	1449
Dreikönigsglocke (Three Kings Bell)	4	3,800 kg	H0	Hermann Große, Dresden	1880
St. Ursula's Bell (Ursulaglocke)	5	2,500 kg	C1	Joseph Beduwe, Aachen	1862
St. Joseph's Bell (Josephglocke)	6	2,200 kg	D2	Hans Augustus Mark, Eifel Foundry, Brockscheid	1998
Chapter Bell (Kapitelsglocke)	7	1,400 kg	E2	Karl I Otto, Bremen	1911
Hail Bell (Aveglocke)	8	830 kg	G2	Karl I Otto, Bremen	1911

Bells of the Central Turret
Name	No	Weight	Note	Founder	Year
Angelusglocke	9	762	G♯2	Unknown	14th century
Mettglocke	10	280	B2	Antonius Coblenz, Cologne	1111
Wandlungsglocke	11	428	E3	Coblenz	1716

=== Choirs ===
Cologne Cathedral has four regular choirs, a boys' choir: Kölner Domchor, a girls choir: Mädchenchor am Kölner Dom, and two mixed adult choirs: the Domkantorei Köln and the chamber choir Vokalensemble Kölner Dom.

== Organisation ==
The Cathedral Chapter of Cologne is a community of diocesan priests that advises the archbishop of Cologne in the administration of the archdiocese. The members of the chapter, also known as canons (German: Domkapitular), is responsible for the pastoral care of the Cologne Cathedral, in particular the celebration of the liturgy inside the cathedral. Furthermore, the canons have the task of electing the archbishop of Cologne according to the Prussian Concordat. The chapter consists of the Provost and the Dean, together with around ten resident canons and four non-resident canons.

== See also ==
Cologne Cathedral in 2014 (video)

- Cologne Cathedral quarter
- Gothic cathedrals and churches
- List of Gothic Cathedrals in Europe
- Architecture of cathedrals and great churches
- Gero Cross
- Gothic Revival architecture
- List of buildings and structures
- List of highest church naves
- List of cathedrals in Germany
- List of tallest structures built before the 20th century

Records
Preceded by Rouen Cathedral	World's tallest structure 1880–1884; 157.38 m	Succeeded by Washington Monument
Preceded by Rouen Cathedral	Tallest building in the world 1880–1890; 157.38 m	Succeeded by Ulm Minster
Preceded by Rouen Cathedral	Tallest building in Europe; 1880–1890; 157.38 m	Succeeded by Ulm Minster
