= Madonna of the Rose Bower (Lochner) =

Painting by Stefan Lochner

- Virgin in the Rose Bower
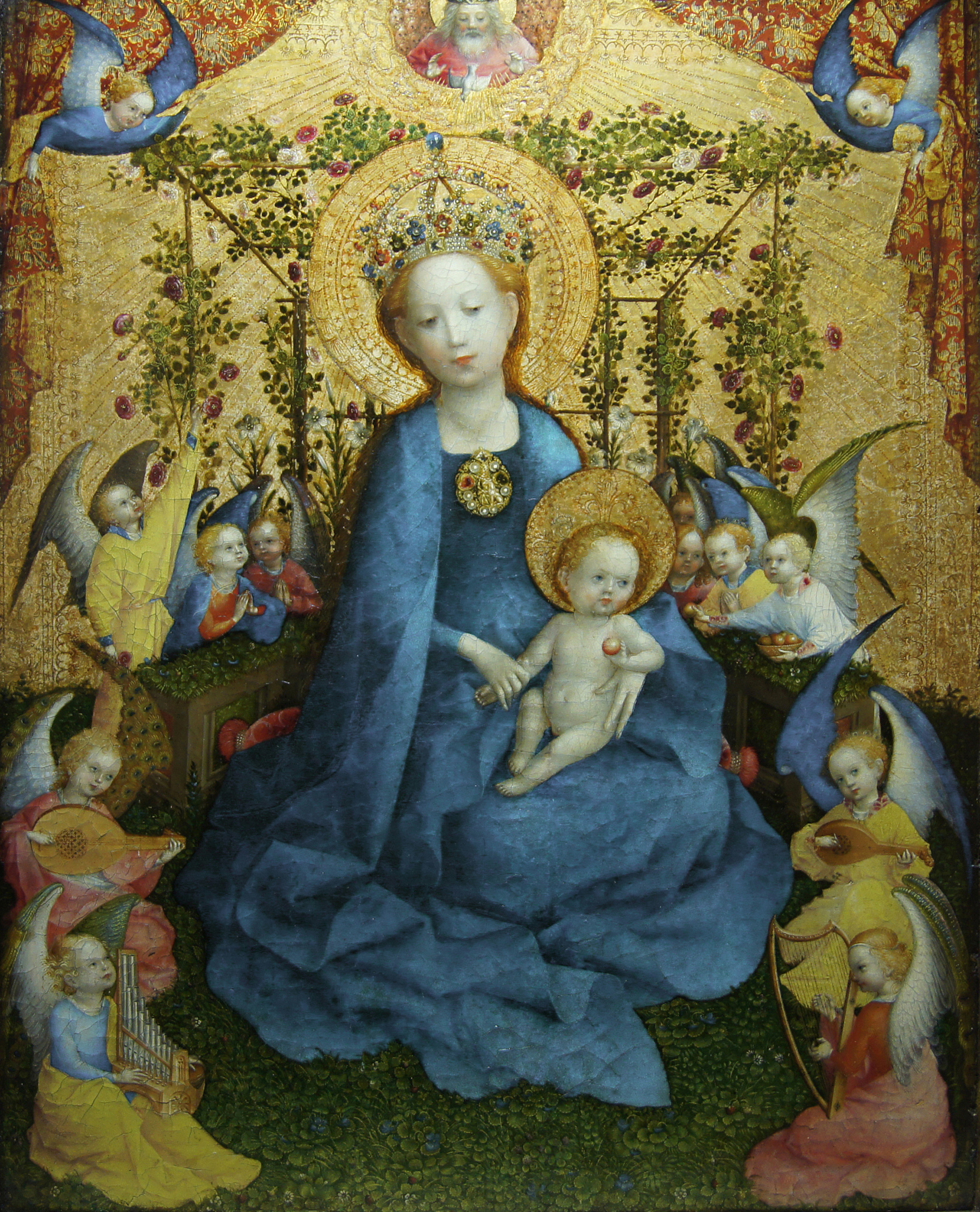
- Artist: Stephan Lochner
- Year: c. 1440-1442
- Location: Wallraf-Richartz Museum, Cologne

Madonna of the Rose Bower (or Virgin in the Rose Bower) is a panel painting by the German artist Stefan Lochner, usually dated c. 1440–1442. However, the specific date of the piece has been the subject of debate by numerous art historians throughout the years. The painting is one of the most famous of its kind from Cologne. It has been mass reproduced and printed multiple times due to its popularity. It is now located in the Wallraf-Richartz Museum in Cologne.

It is one of three Virgin of Humility style paintings that Lochner created. The painting is an example of Gothic style Cologne painting from the Renaissance, looking similar to medieval paintings because of the Gothic nature. It is also heavily iconographic, with many details containing religious symbolism. It is usually seen as one of his finest and most closely detailed works.

== Stylistic influences ==
Madonna of the Rose Bower differs slightly from other Renaissance works due to the Gothic influence on art within Cologne, now modern day Germany. The Gothic influence of medieval art continued through into the Renaissance in Cologne where Lochner spent most of his art career. Lochner mainly used primary colors, symmetrical composition, and employed heavy use of gold as a method of depicting heavenly spaces. This is due to a higher focus on communicating religious symbolism in paintings as a form of creating a lasting impact on the viewer. It was believed that connecting with God through painting was more effective this way.

Lochner's panel painting shares visual elements of metalworking practices. These elements show Lochner's understanding of metalworking techniques through the realistic representation. Examples of this within the painting are techniques like émail en rende-bosse on the Virgin's brooch and the realistic reflections on the inlaid gems on her crown. It is also argued that the presence of the curtain strengthens this comparison as valuable metal artworks would be kept behind curtains while not being viewed. The curtain in the painting is parted, showing the piece to the viewer like a metalwork piece would.

Lochner painted the Virgin's garment using a technique similar to pointillism. Although pointillism was not developed until the 18th and 19th centuries, Lochner used a similar approach by applying small, dark dots to garments. These dots would make it look like the viewer could see the human body underneath the garments. He used this technique in many of his miniatures and panel paintings, including Madonna of the Rose Bower.

== Description and iconography ==
The Virgin is presented as "Queen of Heaven", and is seated in a rose garden, symbolizing the heavenly Eden, under a canopy with red curtains held apart by angels. Christ sits in the Virgin's lap. The two are seated on a velvet bolster. Many flowers bloom around the Virgin, among the foliage are strawberry plants as well. These even grow up onto the curved bench that is placed behind her. Closer to the Virgin are white lilies and an acanthus. The enclosed garden, also known as a hortus conclusus, is a typical setting for this style of painting. This is due to its representation of Mary's virginity. Another representation of her virginity are her accessories, her medallion and her crown. On her crown is a sapphire that reflects a window. This window symbolizes a metaphorical portal that connects the viewer of the painting to the picture plane. This reflection was used in numerous of Lochner's paintings and was typically purely symbolic and not concerned with the realism of the setting. She wears a finely detailed brooch on her blue dress. This brooch depicts a maiden who is sitting with a unicorn. This is believed to represent the Virgin becoming pregnant and Christ appearing within her womb.

The Virgin and Christ are seated in the middle of the painting, surrounding them are many small angels that are engaging with different activities. The angels are collecting and offering the Virgin and Christ items from the gardens, including apples. This alludes to Christ's role on Earth and connects him to Adam from the Old Testament, as well as Christ representing a new Adam. The angels sitting on the ground are playing music on different kinds of instruments. Lochner has been praised for the accuracy of the instruments in both their presentation and how the angels are playing them. Groups of angels, typically larger, playing music are usually depicted with a divinely enthroned figure or within an environment that is meant to be considered as a paradise.

The painting is heavily infused with symbols of innocence and purity, including the red and white roses. The red color of the strawberries and roses reference Christ's forthcoming Passion. Another interpretation of the red roses is that they represent martyrdom, as how they were used in early Christian iconography. The Virgin is depicted in a royal manner, this is mainly done through her relative scale. She is depicted as physically larger than the elements around her, showing her importance within a visual form.

Above the Virgin is God, who is watching over them, and a dove. This dove represents the Holy Spirit. together with Christ sitting on her lap, Lochner has pictured the Trinity. This arrangement of God above her also reinforces Mary's divine motherhood.

== Date ==
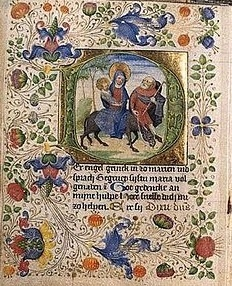
Stephan Lochner, Darmstadt Flight into Egypt, c. 1451

There has been numerous theories on when Madonna of the Rose Bower should be dated, due to the lack of written records that provide a concrete answer. Scholar Gustav Waagen argued that the painting should be dated as one of Lochner's earlier works, because it is more stylized and less realistic. Waagen thought that artists developed a realistic style throughout their career so the idealized nature of the painting would date it as one of the earlier works.

Another scholar, Hubert Schrade, argued that the work resembled early Cologne painting due to the use of symmetry and gold. Schrade dated Madonna of the Rose Bower to the time when Lochner first started working in Cologne around 1430.

Another element considered was the influence of Netherlandish artistic traditions on Lochner's works. Otto Förster noticed the lack of Netherlandish influence within the piece and placed it later in the timeline of Lochner's works, under the belief that Lochner phased out of the style as his work developed.

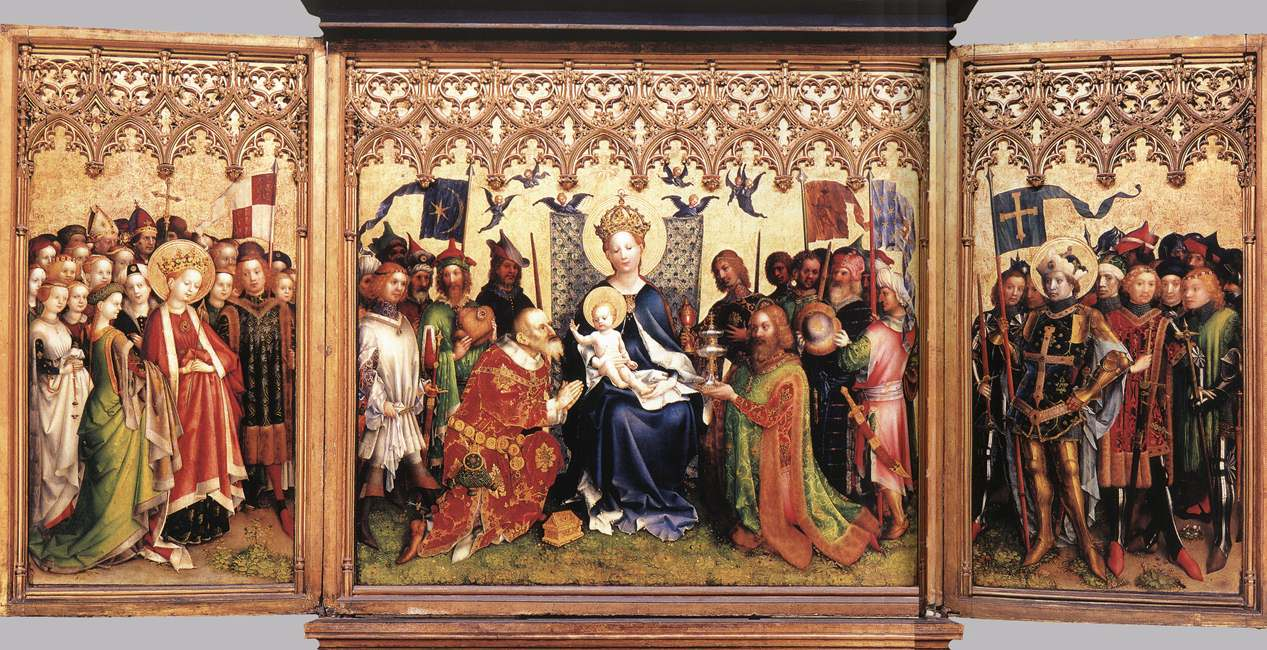
Stefan Lochner, Dombild Altarpiece

It is also believed to be dated near the Darmstadt Book of hours, making it a later work. Julien Chapius argues this perspective through his observations of the miniatures within the 1451 Darmstadt which bear similarities of developmental style to Madonna of the Rose Bower.

Another art historian, Manfred Wundram, dated the piece close to Lochner's Dombild Altarpiece (or The Altarpiece of the City Patron Saints) because he believed the two were contemporaneous. This would place the date between 1442 and 1444 when it is believed that the altarpiece was created.

=== Oeuvre ===
Due to the lack of a signature on the painting, Lochner's identity as the artist was unknown until 1823. What revealed him as the artist was a note by artist, Albrect Dürer. This note mentioned Lochner's name in connection to another of his paintings, Dombild Altarpiece. That note helped art historians confirm Lochner as the creator of his works, including Madonna of the Rose Bower.

== See also ==
- 100 Great Paintings, 1980 BBC series
- Madonna of the Rose Bower (Schongauer)

== Sources ==
- Chapuis, Julien (2004). Stefan Lochner: Image Making in Fifteenth-century Cologne. Harvey Miller Publishers. ISBN 978-2-503-50567-1.
- Grubb, Nancy (1995). Angels in Art. Artabras. ISBN 978-0-89660-062-1.
- Kovačevski, Christo (1991). The Madonna in Western Painting. Cromwell Editions. ISBN 978-0-88168-193-2. OCLC 1067509788.
- Levine, Daniel (1997). "'St. Jerome in His Cell' and the Chronology of Stefan Lochner's Work". Wallraf-Richartz-Jahrbuch. 58: 215–218. JSTOR 24664200.
- Lucas, Tamara (September 2017). "The art of perception: pointillism, pattern, and Optical art". The Lancet. 390 (10102): 1579. doi:10.1016/S0140-6736(17)32488-1.
- Salvador González, José María (20 September 2014). "'Sicut lilium inter spinas'. Floral Metaphors in Late Medieval Marian Iconography from Patristic and Theological Sources". Eikon / Imago. 3 (2): 1–32. doi:10.5209/eiko.73394.
- Stokstad, Marilyn (1968). Renaissance Art Outside Italy. W. C. Brown Company. OCLC 438469.
- Wallraf-Richartz-Museum & Fondation Corboud. "Madonna of the Rose Bower: The Artist." Accessed November 17, 2024. https://www.wallraf.museum/en/collections/middle-ages/masterpieces/stefan-lochner-madonna-of-the-rose-bower/the-artist/.
- Wallraf-Richartz-Museum & Fondation Corboud. "Madonna of the Rose Bower: The Highlight." Accessed November 17, 2024. https://www.wallraf.museum/en/collections/middle-ages/masterpieces/stefan-lochner-madonna-of-the-rose-bower/the-highlight/.
- Wellesz, Emmy (1967). Stephan Lochner. Bristol: Purnell & Sons Limited. OCLC 1965490.
- Chapuis, Julien. Stefan Lochner: Image Making in Fifteenth-Century Cologne. Turnhout: Brepols, 2004. ISBN 978-2-5035-0567-1
- Wellesz, Emmy; Rothenstein, John (ed). Stephan Lochner. London: Fratelli Fabbri, 1963
