= Presentation of Christ in the Temple (Lochner, 1447) =

Painting by Stefan Lochner

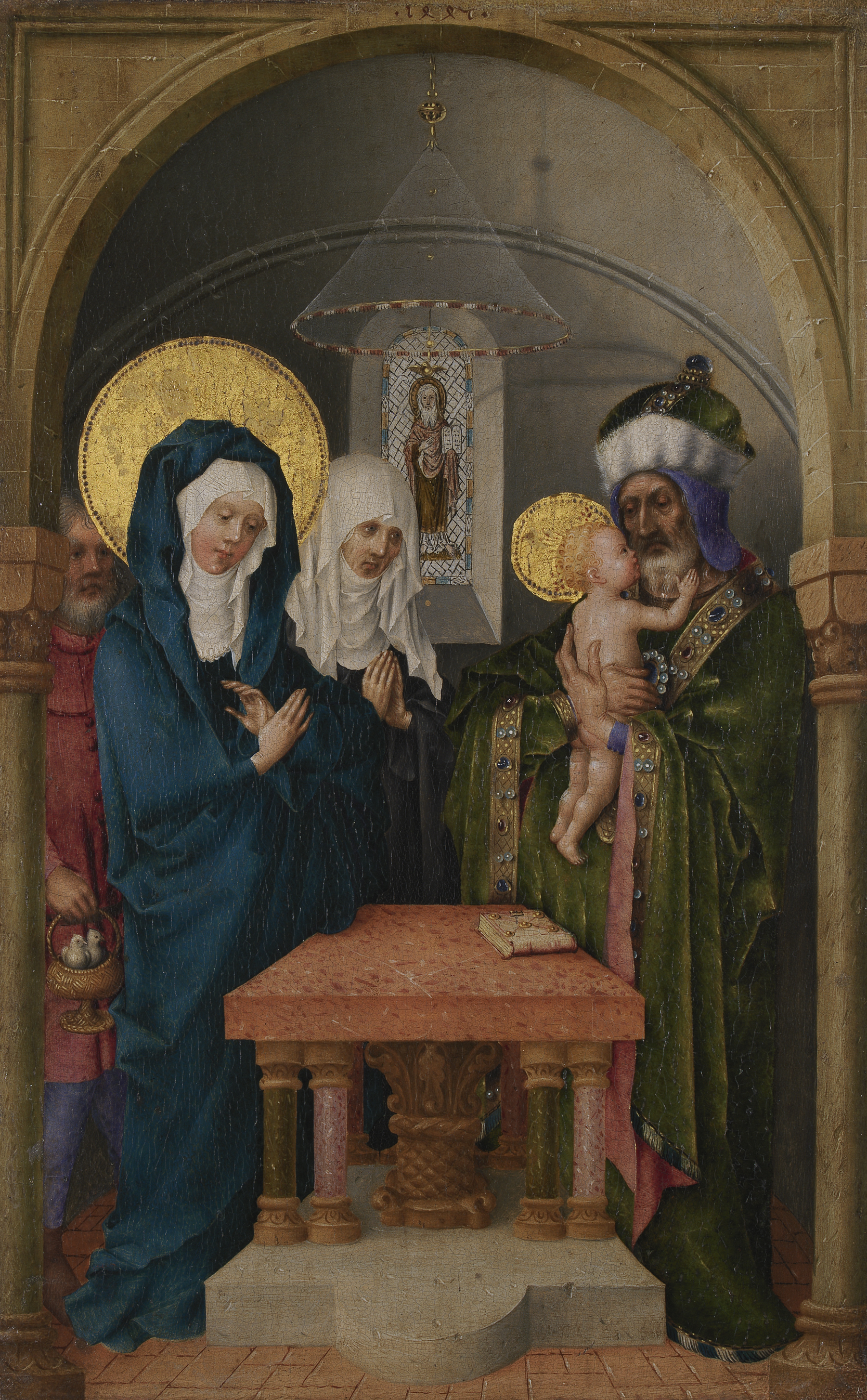
Presentation of Christ in the Temple, 36.7 x 23.7cm, Gulbenkian Foundation, Lisbon

Presentation of Christ in the Temple is a painting by the German artist Stefan Lochner, created c. 1447. it is held in the Calouste Gulbenkian Foundation, in Lisbon. It was once the wing of a diptych, the opposite, now separated, panel was a depiction of the Nativity. Its reverse shows the Stigmatisation of St. Francis. The panel is dedicated to St. Catherine and shows the purification of the Virgin. It is the first of two of Lochner's treatments of the subject - a larger painting completed two years later is kept at the Hessisches Landesmuseum, Darmstadt, Germany. The two panels are the only known dated paintings left by Lochner.

The work seems derived from and influenced by Flemish art; similarity can be seen in the facial type given to Simeon, as well as certain elements of the architecture.

== Description ==
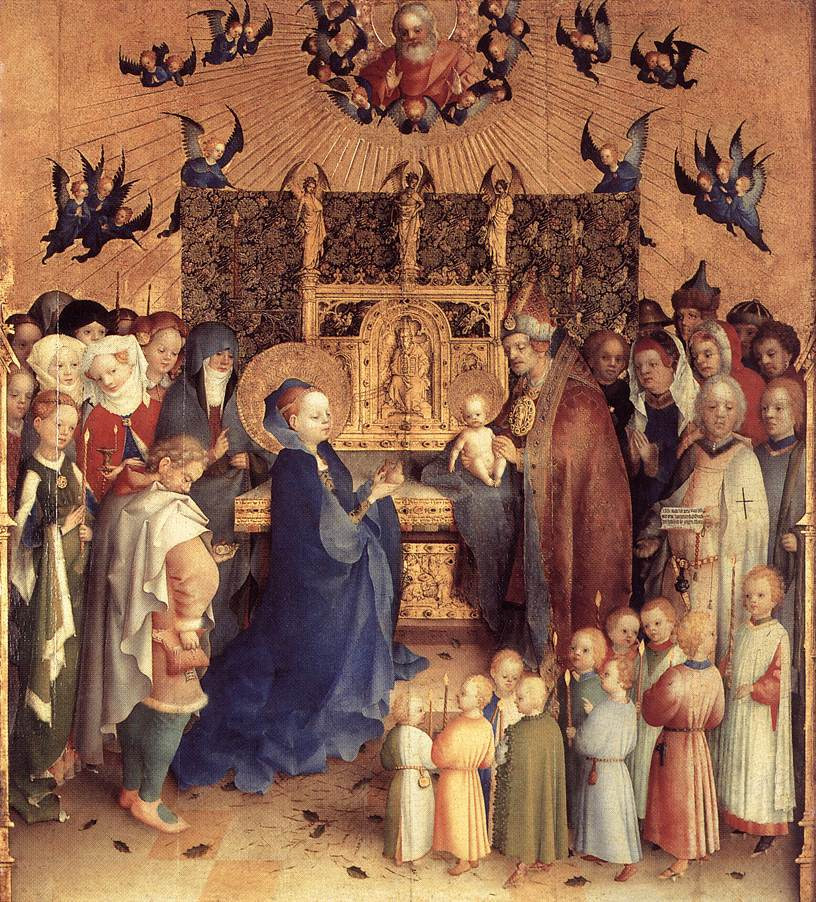
Presentation of Christ in the Temple, 1447

The painting is in the late International Gothic style. It is rather static and sculptural, with any action limited to the main characters positioned in the center of the panel. The scene is set within a domed apse-like building, as an altarpiece takes center stage it is presumably a church. The Virgin stands to the left, to her right is Anna the Prophetess and behind her, only partially visible is St. Joseph, who holds the sacrificial doves. Simeon is dressed in green and appears quite regal, although he appears to be crying, perhaps because he knows the tragedy that awaits Christ in later life. He holds the Christ child, the stained glass behind them shows a representation of Moses holding the Tablets of Stone.

The later version is more expansive, contains many more characters, and delves into the later stages of the biblical story. Reflectology indicate there was very little preparatory underdrawing undertaken before the final paint was applied. The panel is in very good condition, and has suffered only minor paint loss. The exterior painting is less well preserved, with scratchings and paint losses on important passages. It is painted on a single board of oak, with a vertical grain.

Although the painting is quite flat, perspective is achieved through the subtle fall of light which creates distance between the rear wall and framing arch. Other methods of depicting recession include the relative sizes of the floor tiles, and the overlapping of figures.
