= Last Judgement (Lochner) =

Polyptych by Stefan Lochner

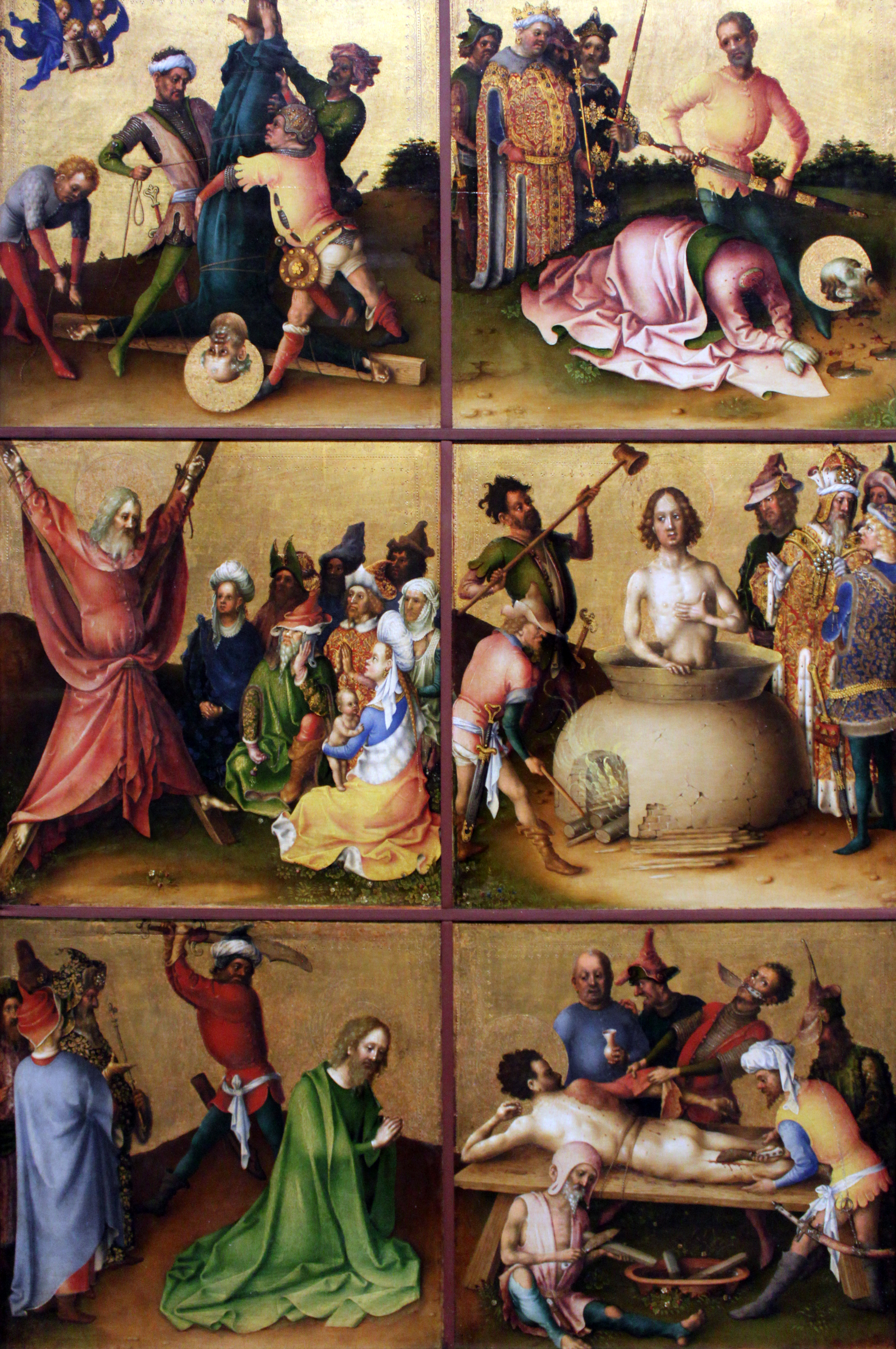
Left wing, Martyrdom of the Apostles

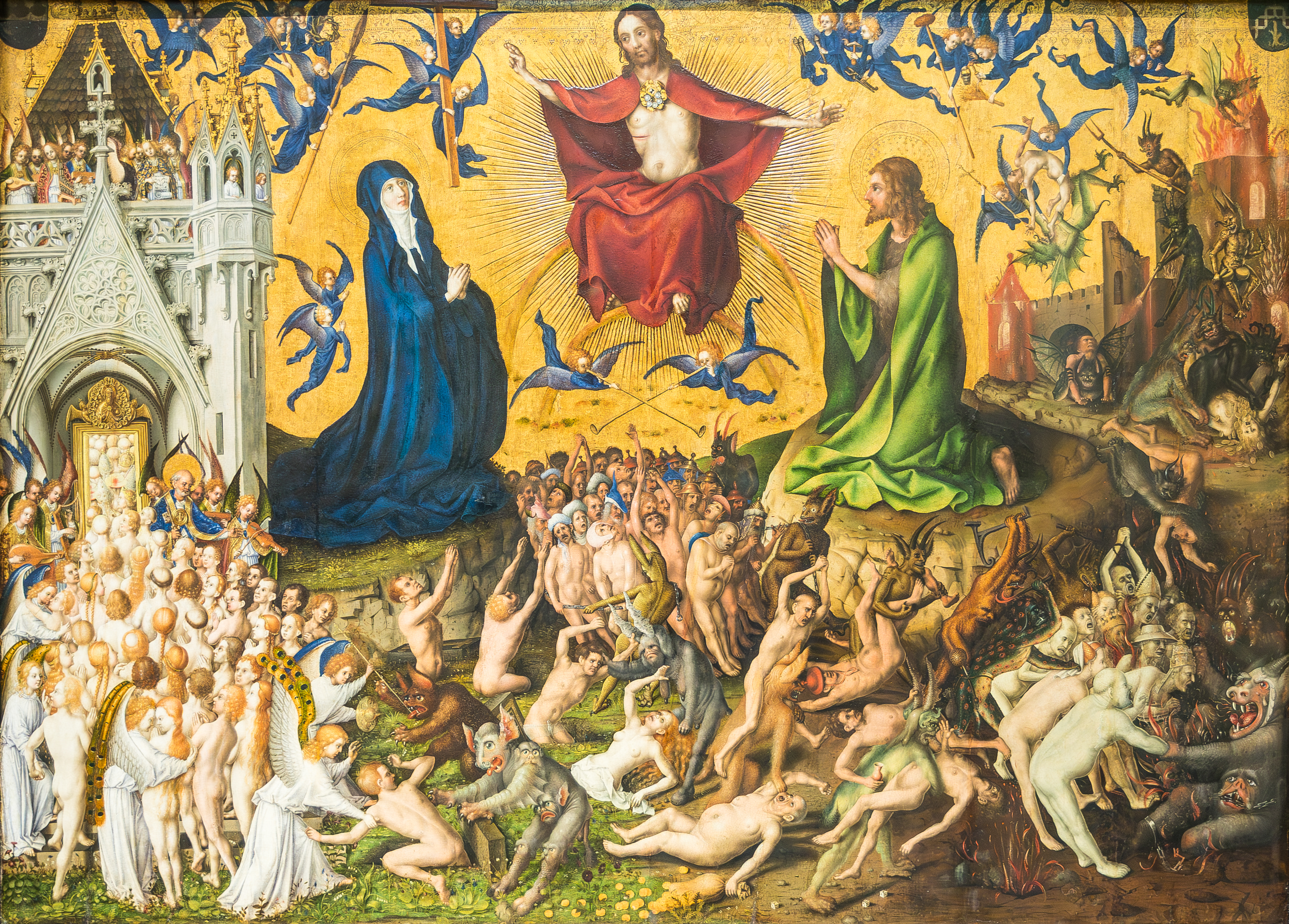
Last Judgement, c. 1435. Wallraf-Richartz Museum, Cologne

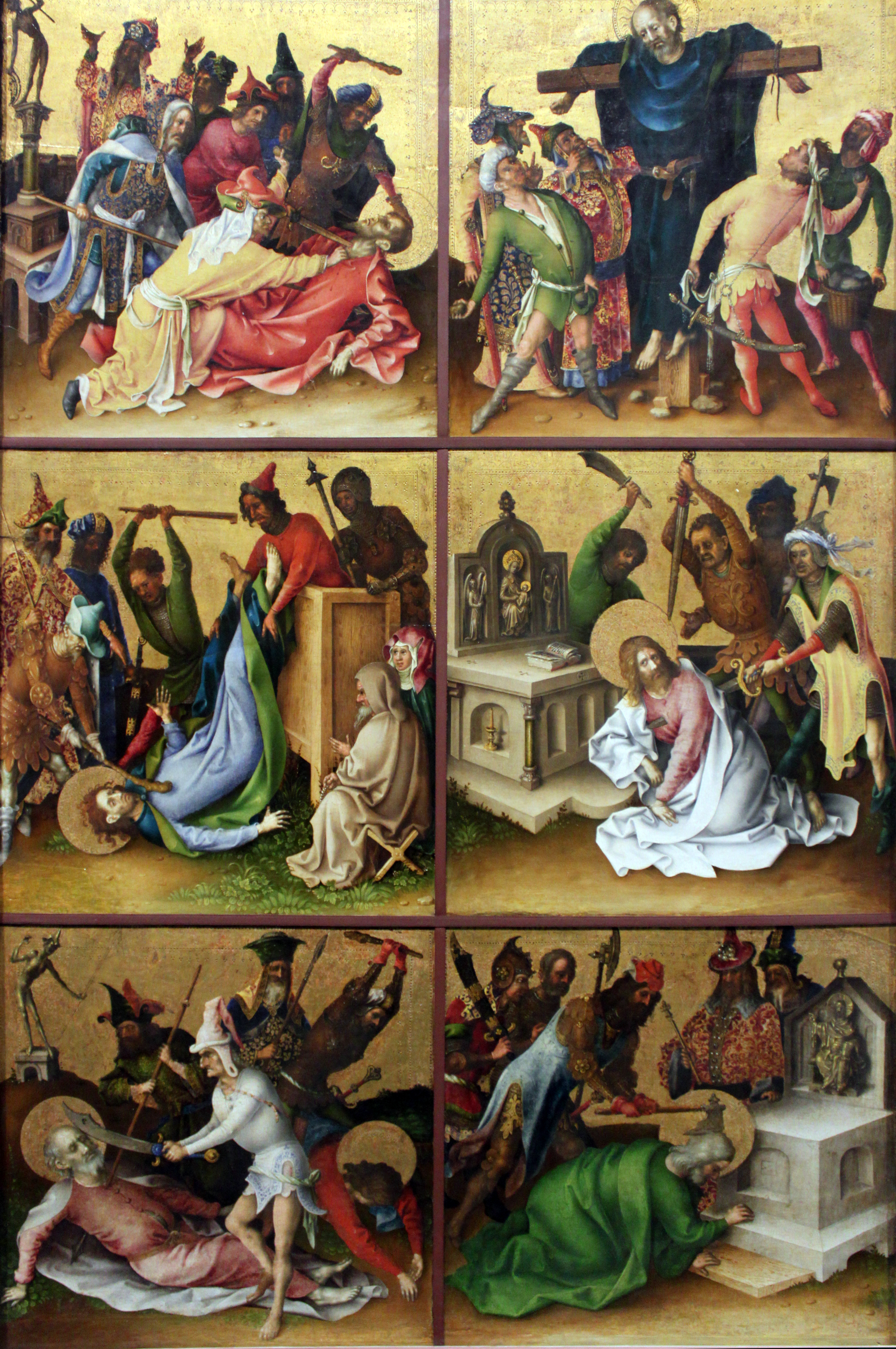
Right wing, Martyrdom of the Apostles

Last Judgement (German: Weltgericht) is a c. 1435 tempera-on-oak polyptych by the German artist Stefan Lochner, probably commissioned for the council chamber of City Hall of Cologne, but now broken apart. Today the outer wings, which formed a sixfold partition when extended, have been sawed off into twelve individual pictures, most of which are still extant but held in separate collections, mostly in Cologne, Munich and Frankfurt. The interior wings included the Martyrdom of the Apostles, the exterior panels comprised in part of the Saint Anthony Abbot, Mary Magdalene and a Donor, Saints Catherine, Hubert, Quirinus of Neuss, and a Donor, and Pope Cornelius. Its depiction of the Last Judgment follows many of the conventions of contemporary doom paintings, but Lochner introduces important innovations, especially in his rendering of the angel's black and flowing clothes.

The panel is first recorded in 1764, in an inventory of the Parish Church of St Lawrence, Cologne, and is now in the Wallraf-Richartz-Museum, Cologne, since it was bequeathed in 1824.

== Description ==
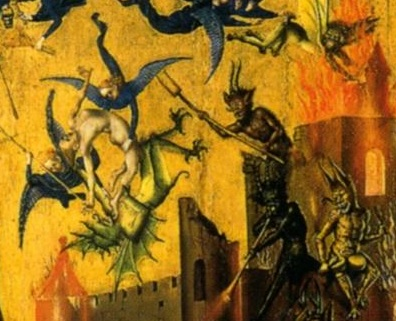
Angels battle with demons in the upper right of the panel.

The painting is divided into an upper and lower register. The upper half is dominated by the three large forms of Jesus, Mary and St. John. Jesus is placed in the center of the upper half of the panel, sitting on a double rainbow which emits beams, with his hand held outwards. Mary and John kneel at either side of him in poses of prayer as they beg for salvation for the souls beneath. Jesus' right hand is raised in the act of blessing the dead who are to be admitted to the Kingdom of Heaven, his left hand is lowered as he condemns the sinners to eternal punishment. He is dressed in a red robe decorated with pearls. His robe is open to reveal the nails holes in his hands and the wound to his lower chest sustained during his crucifixion. Jesus looks down toward the saved to his right. A large group of angels hover at either side of him, some hold the arma Christi - the attributes of the Passion of Christ. The two angels by his feet play long trumpets, signaling judgement.

The saints domination of the panel is achieved both through their relative size compared to angels and the mortals below (as is usual for paintings of the "Last Judgement"), but also according to Weiss, through the "impact of their gestures and the massive curves of their garments". They are dressed in bright and vivid clothes, Jesus' robe is ruby red, St. John's is emerald, Mary's is amethyst coloured.

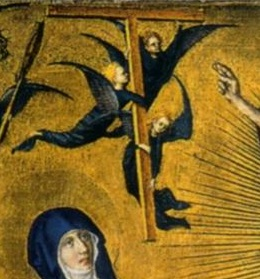
Angels hold the cross above Mary

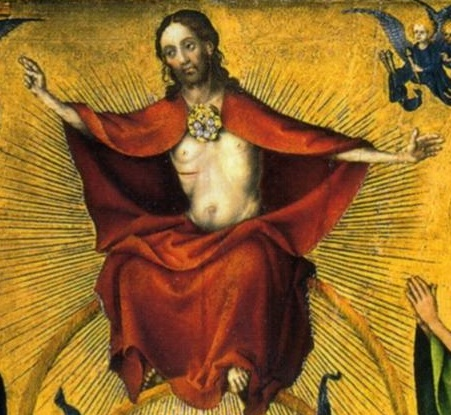
Christ in Majesty

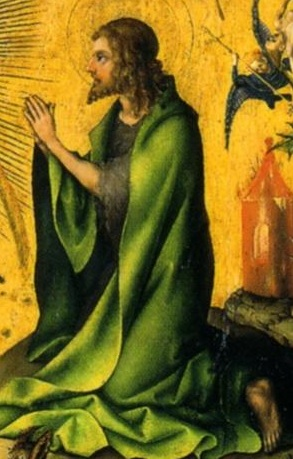
St John kneels in prayer

The lower half of the panel shows a large body of mortals and demons. The dead rise from their graves, and depending on the judgement of Christ, are either received into heaven or banished into hell. As is traditional, the saved are accompanied by angels as they move towards (from the viewer's perspective) the left hand side of the picture. The damned, who occupy two thirds of the lower half of the panel, are scuttled and tormented by demons towards the right hand side. In this work, the saved are finally greeted by St. Peter as they enter a heavenly city, while the lost are driven towards the blazing fires of hell. The faces and expressions of the damned are full of dread and physical pain. Some of the devils drag the condemned using a chain, in a passage in the lower right, four demons drag souls towards a pit where other devils wait at a raging fire. The demons gnash their teeth.

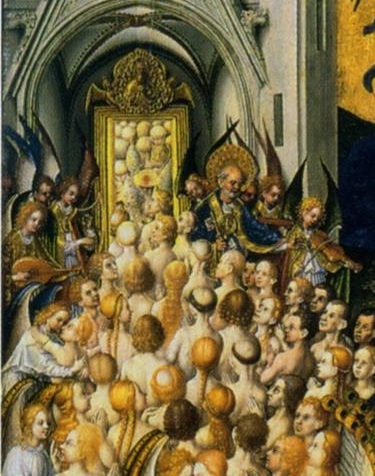
The gates of heaven

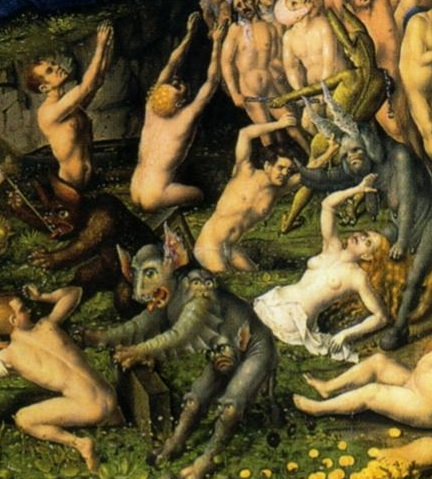
The dead rise from their graves

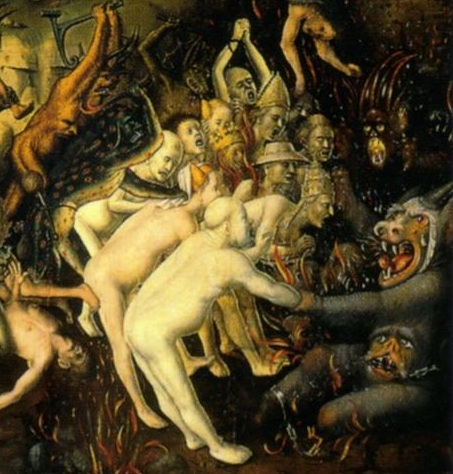
The damned dragged to hell by demons

Technical examination reveals numerous and detailed underdrawings, none of which deviate significantly from the final composition. Most of these sketches focus on the three saint's clothes, which are laid out using cross-hatching of various intensity. The faces of the saints are rarely described, with their eyes indicted merely by poorly defined circles. The painting is in poor condition, and has suffered heavy discoloration. The background was originally blue but is now black; its main pigment was azurite, which over the centuries has darkened considerably. Some of the original patterns of the figures clothes are now barely discernible, but can be detected through x-ray.

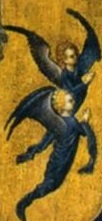
Angels

Both its attribution and dating have proved difficult and it was long thought to be by a workshop member, pupil or follower of Lochner. The debate arose in particular because the panel is so different in composition and mood to other known works by Lochner, which in contrast to the dramatic visions contained in this panel, are known for their late Gothic serenity and soft colourisation.

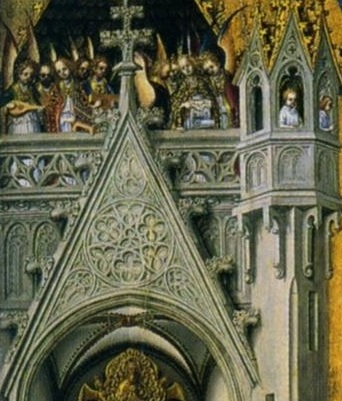
Detail showing the ruined castle

It is believed to originate from early in his career, as in places it does not, according to art critic Emmy Wellesz, "attain the perfect harmony of line, the subtle relationship of the component parts within the total structure, which we admire in Lochner's mature work". Mindful of similar differences, other art historians have argued that it should be placed at the end of his career, when he was trying to break from his usual conventions. Analysis of the patterns of the tree rings dates the earliest of its three boards to 1406, which accounting for seasoning and maturing gives an earliest date of completion of c 1425. However, it is considered one of the most important paintings in his oeuvre, critics cite its "dramatic excitement" and the study of Gothic architecture in the ruined castle.
