= Stefan Lochner =

German painter (c. 1410 – 1451)

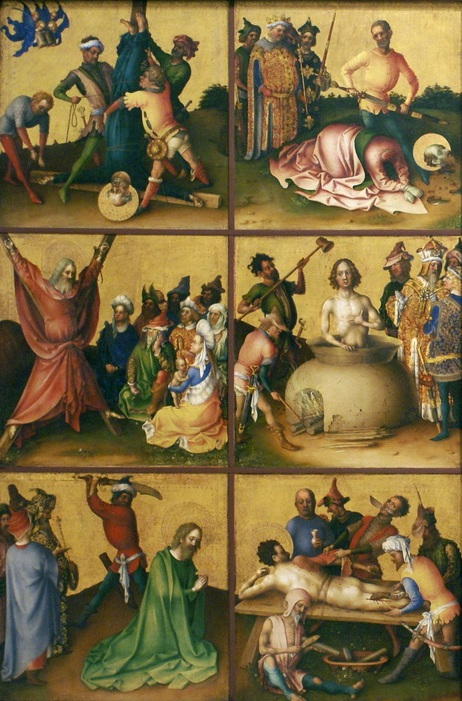
Left wing, Martyrdom of the Apostles

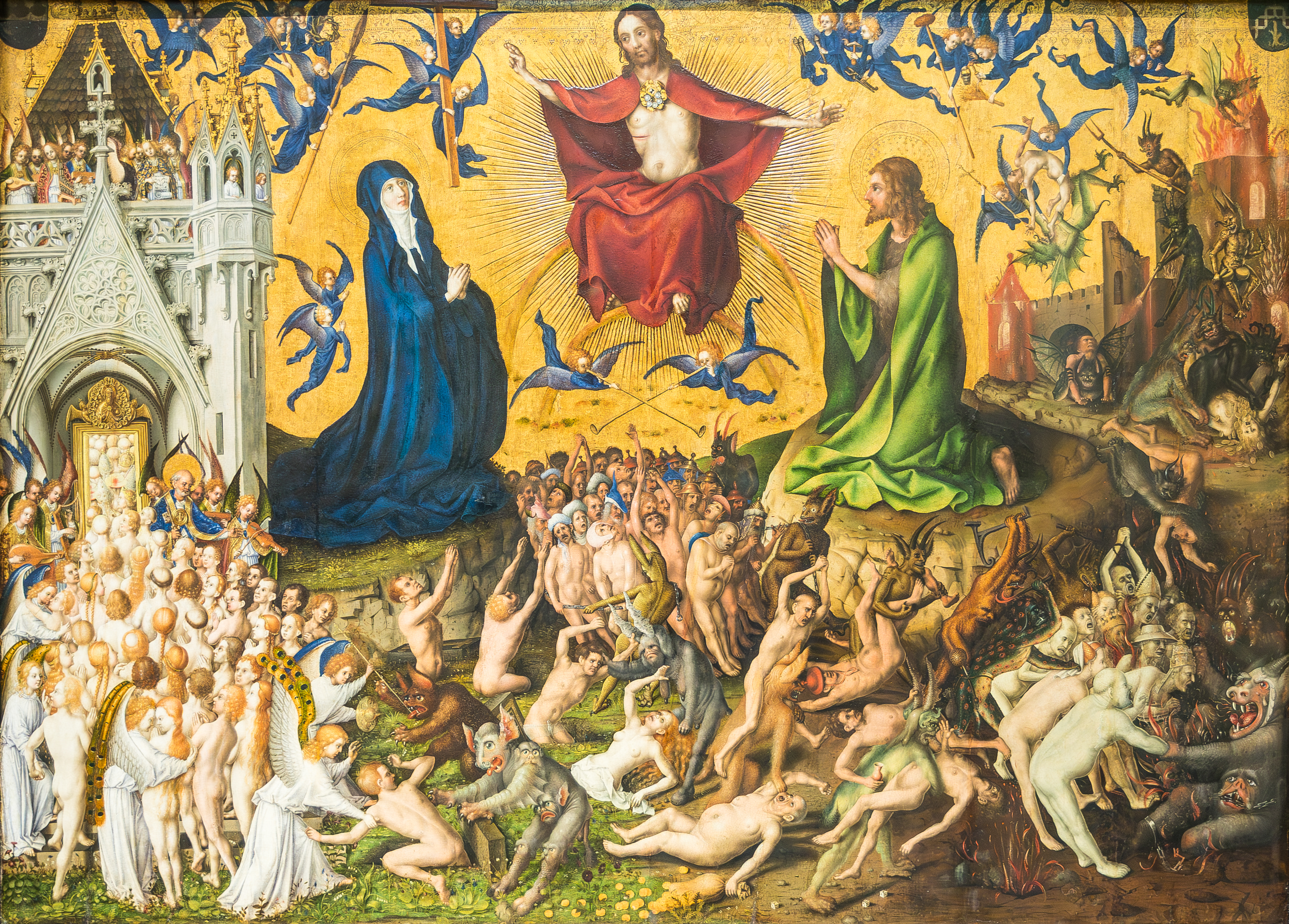
Last Judgement, c. 1435. Wallraf-Richartz Museum, Cologne

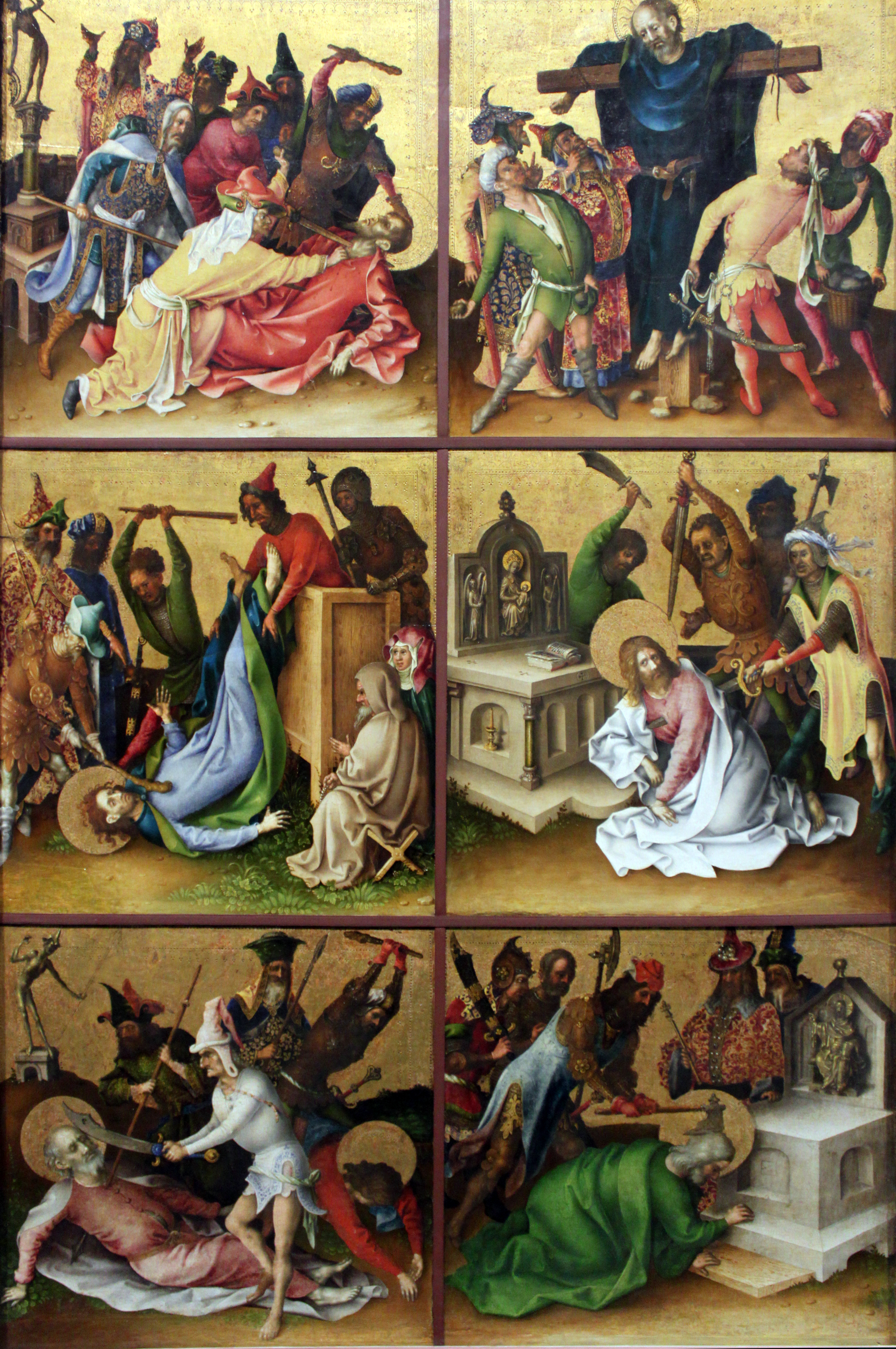
Right wing, Martyrdom of the Apostles

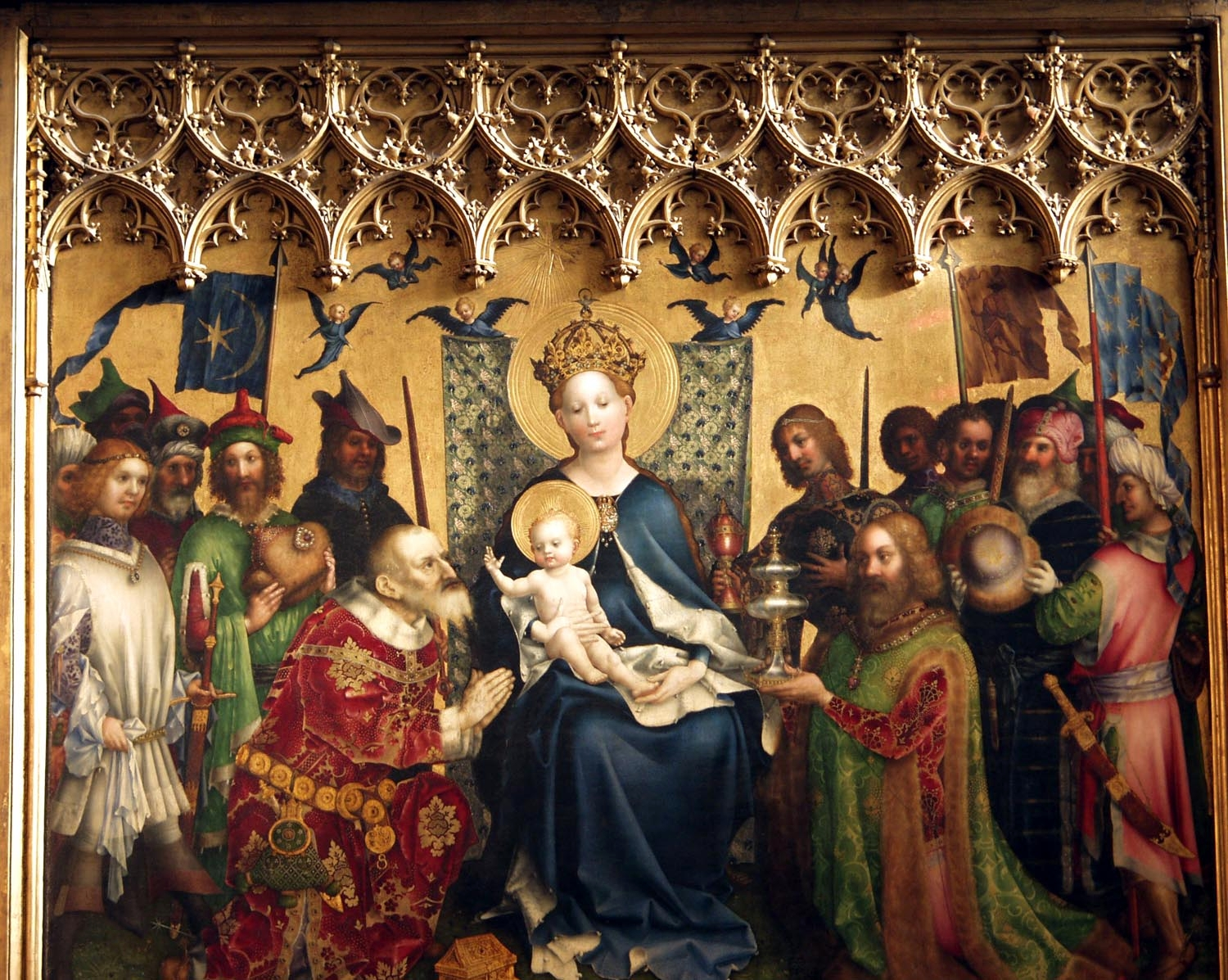
Dombild Altarpiece (or Altarpiece of the City's Patron Saints or Adoration of the Magi), centre panel. Tempera on oak, 260 × 285 cm. Cologne Cathedral

Stefan Lochner (the Dombild Master or Master Stefan; c. 1410 – late 1451) was a German painter working in the late International Gothic period. His paintings combine that era's tendency toward long flowing lines and brilliant colours with the realism, virtuoso surface textures and innovative iconography of the early Northern Renaissance. Based in Cologne, a commercial and artistic hub of northern Europe, Lochner was one of the most important German painters before Albrecht Dürer. Extant works include single-panel oil paintings, devotional polyptychs and illuminated manuscripts, which often feature fanciful and blue-winged angels. Today some thirty-seven individual panels are attributed to him with confidence.

Less is known of his life. Art historians associating the Dombild Altarpiece master with the historical Stefan Lochner think he was born in Meersburg in south-west Germany around 1410, and that he spent some of his apprenticeship in the Low Countries. Records further indicate that his career developed quickly but was cut short by an early death. We know that he was commissioned around 1442 by the Cologne council to provide decorations for the visit of Emperor Frederick III, a major occasion for the city. Records from the following years indicate growing wealth and the purchase of a number of properties around the city. Thereafter he seems to have over-extended his finances and fallen into debt. Plague hit Cologne in 1451 and there, apart from the records of creditors, mention of Stephan Lochner ends; it is presumed he died that year, aged around 40.

Lochner's identity and reputation were lost until a revival of 15th-century art during the early 19th-century romantic period. Despite extensive historical research, attribution remains difficult; for centuries a number of associated works were grouped and loosely attributed to the Dombild Master, a notname taken from the Dombild Altarpiece (in English cathedral picture, also known as the Altarpiece of the City's Patron Saints) still in Cologne Cathedral. One of Dürer's diary entries became key, 400 years later, in the 20th-century establishment of Lochner's identity. Only two attributed works are dated, and none are signed. His influence on successive generations of northern artists was substantial. Apart from the many direct copies made in the later 15th century, echoes of his panels can be seen in works by Rogier van der Weyden and Hans Memling. Lochner's work was praised by Friedrich Schlegel and Goethe for its qualities, especially the "sweetness and grace" of his Madonnas.

== Identity and attribution ==
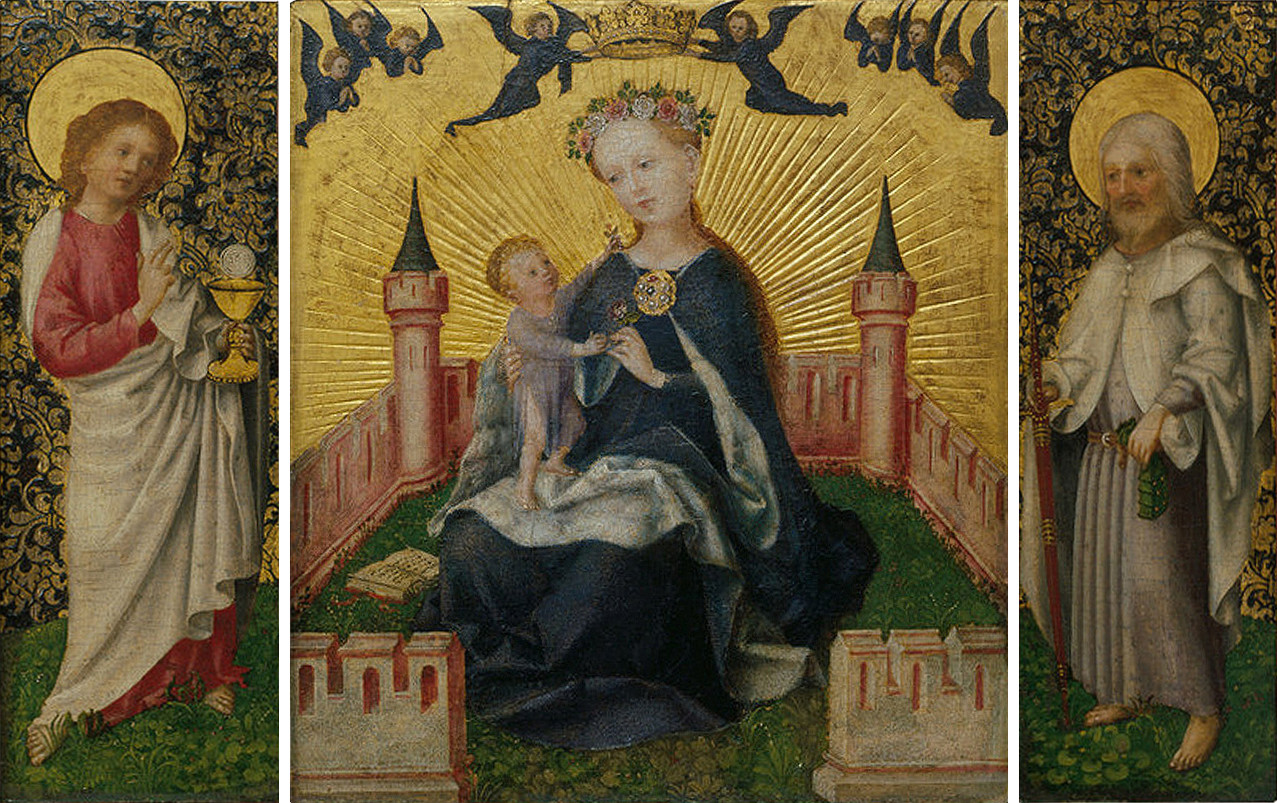
Triptych with the Virgin in the Garden of Paradise, c. 1445–50. Wallraf-Richartz-Museum, Cologne

There are no signed paintings by Lochner, and his identity was not established until the 19th century. J. F. Böhmer in an 1823 article identified the Dombild (meaning "Cathedral picture") or Altarpiece of the City's Patron Saints with a work mentioned in an account of a visit to Cologne in 1520 in the diary of Albrecht Dürer. The notoriously thrifty artist paid 5 silver pfennig to see an altarpiece by "Maister Steffan" some seventy years after Lochner's death. Although Dürer fails to mention specifically which of Maister Steffan's panels he had seen, his description matches exactly the centre panel of the Dombild Altarpiece. The altarpiece is referred to in a number of other records. It was repaired and re-gilded in 1568, and mentioned in Georg Braun's Civitates Orbis Terrarum in 1572.

German Gothic art underwent a revival in the early 19th-century Romantic period when the work was seen as a climax of the late Gothic period. The German philosopher and critic Friedrich Schlegel was instrumental in reviving Lochner's reputation. He wrote lengthy tracts comparing the Dombild favourably to the work of Raphael, and thought it exceeded anything by van Eyck, Dürer or Holbein. Later, Goethe was enthusiastic, emphasising Lochner's German "spirit and origin"; he described the Dombild as the "axis around which the ancient Netherlandish art resolves into the new".

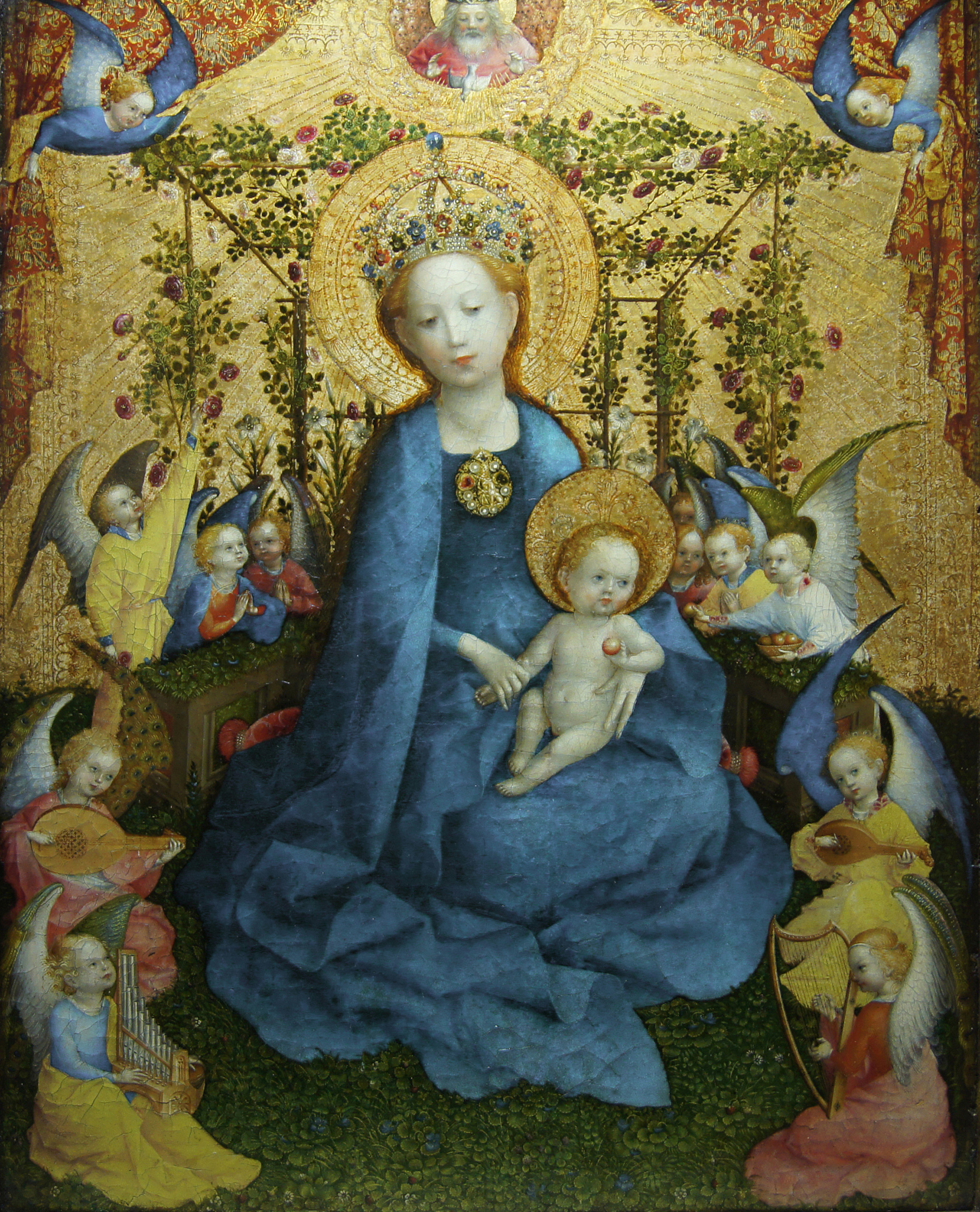
Madonna of the Rose Bower, c. 1440–42. Wallraf-Richartz Museum, Cologne

Lochner's identity remained unknown for centuries, and no other known works were associated with the Dombild altarpiece. In 1816 Ferdinand Franz Wallraf identified him as Philipp Kalf, based on a reading of a name inscribed on the cloth of a figure on the right of the centre panel. He misinterpreted markings on the stone floor pictured in Annunciation to read 1410, which he took as the year of completion. Johann Dominicus Fiorillo discovered a 15th-century record that read "in 1380 there was an excellent painter in Cologne called Wilhelm, who had no equal in his art and who depicted human beings as if they were alive". In 1850 Johann Jakob Merlo identified "Maister Steffan" with the historical Stefan Lochner.

In 1862, Gustav Waagen became one of the first art historians to try to place Lochner's works in chronological order. His reasoning was based on the assumption that Lochner developed from the early idealised forms usually associated with early 15th-century Cologne and later absorbed the techniques and realism of the Netherlandish painters. In this way, he placed the lighter "gaiety" of Lochner's Madonna paintings from the beginning of his career with the more stern and pessimistic crucifixions and doom panels at the end. Today, art historians think the reverse to be true; the dramatic and innovative polyptychs came first, and the single Madonnas and panels of saints are from his mid-career.

Based on their similarity to the Altar of the City Patrons, art historians have attributed other paintings to Lochner, although a number have questioned whether the diary entry was authentically made by Dürer. Documentary evidence linking the paintings and miniatures with the historical Lochner has also been challenged, most notably by the art historian Michael Wolfson in 1996. In either case, the extent of Lochner's direct hand, as opposed to those of workshop members or followers, is debated. Some panels formerly attributed to him are now thought to date from after 1451, the year of his death.

== Life ==
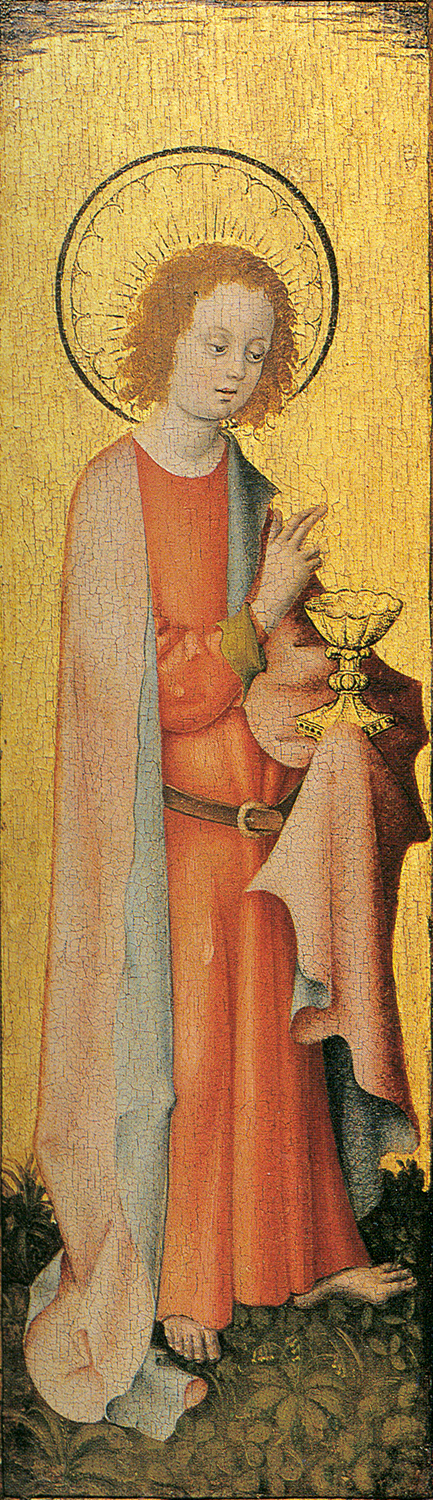
Saint John (wing panel), c. 1448–50, 45 × 14.8 cm. Museum Boijmans Van Beuningen, Rotterdam

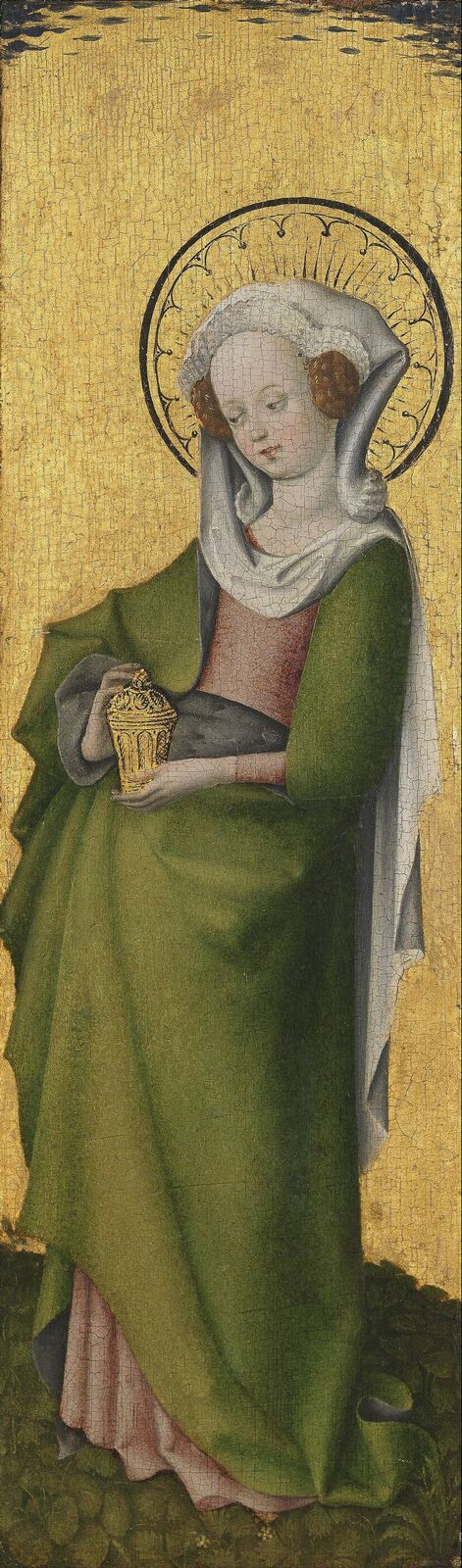
Mary Magdalen, Museum Boijmans Van Beuningen

The outline of the historical Stefan Lochner's life has been established from a small number of records, mostly relating to commissions, payments and property transfers. There are no documents relating to his early life, a contributing factor being the loss of archival records from his supposed birthplace during the French occupation of Cologne.

The primary sources relating to Lochner's life are a June 1442 payment by the city of Cologne in relation to Friedrich's visit; deeds of 27 October 1442 and 28 August 1444 outlining the transfer of ownership of the house at Roggendorf; October 1444 deeds for the purchase of two houses in st Alban; his 24 June 1447 registration as a citizen of Cologne; his December 1447 election to the municipal council; his Christmas 1450 re-election to that post; an August 1451 correspondence with the city council; a 22 September 1451 announcement of the setting up of a plague graveyard next to his property, and finally, court records dated 7 January 1452 detailing the appropriation of his property.

=== Early life ===
Through threadbare clues and supposition, mostly centred around a relatively wealthy couple that perished during a plague, thought to be his parents, Lochner is thought to have come from Meersburg, near Lake Constance. Georg and Alhet Lochner were citizens and died there in 1451. A "Stefan" is referred to as "Stefan Lochner of Constance" in two documents dated 1444 and 1448. However, there is no archival evidence that he was there, and his style bears no trace of the art in that region. There are no further records of him or his family in the town except for a mention of Lochners (a fairly uncommon name) in the village of Hagnau, two kilometres from Meersburg.

However records indicate that Lochner's talent was recognised from an early age. He may have been of Netherlandish origin or worked there for a master, possibly Robert Campin. Lochner's work seems influenced by Jan van Eyck and Rogier van der Weyden; elements of their styles can be detected in the structure and colourisation of Lochner's mature works, especially in his Last Judgement, although neither is thought to be the master with whom he studied.

=== Move to Cologne and success ===
By the 1440s, Cologne was the largest and wealthiest city in the Holy Roman Empire. It controlled and taxed the passage of trade from Flanders to Saxony and became a financial, religious and artistic centre. The city had a long tradition of producing high-quality visual art, and in the 14th century, its output was considered to be equal to that of Vienna and Prague. Cologne's artists concentrated on more personal and intimate subject matters, and the area became known for its production of small panels of "great lyrical charm and loveliness, which reflected the deep devotion of the writings of the German mystics".

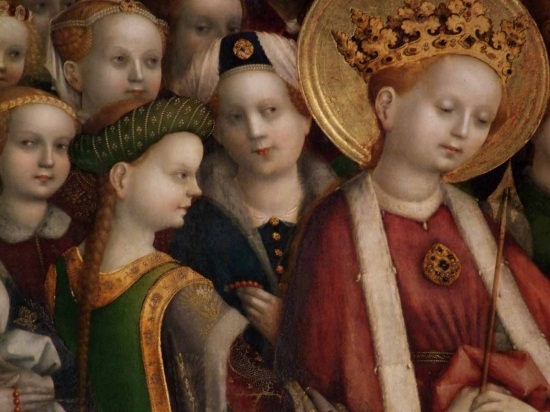
Detail, Dombild Altarpiece

During the 1430s, painting in Cologne had become conventional and somewhat old-fashioned, and still under the influence of the courtly style of the Master of Saint Veronica, active until 1420. After his arrival Lochner, who was earlier exposed to the Netherlandish painters and already working in oils, eclipsed other artists in the city. According to the art historian Emmy Wellesz, after Lochner's arrival "painting in Cologne became infused with a new life", perhaps enriched by the earlier exposure to the Netherlandish artists. He became widely celebrated as the most capable and modern painter in the city, where he was known as "Maister Steffan zu Cöln".

Lochner first appears in extant records in 1442, nine years before he died. He moved to Cologne where he received a commission from the city council for the provision of decorations for the visit of Emperor Frederick III. Lochner was seemingly well established and although other artists were involved in preparing for the event, he was responsible for the most important arrangements. The centrepiece seems to have been the Dombild Altarpiece, described by modern art historians as "the most important commission of the fifteenth century in Cologne". He is recorded as having been paid forty marks and ten shillings for his effort.

Lochner bought a house with his wife Lysbeth around 1442. Nothing else is known about her and the couple apparently had no children. In 1444 he acquired two larger properties, the "zome Carbunckel", near Saint Alban Church, and the "zome Alden Gryne". Historians have speculated whether these acquisitions indicate a need to house a growing group of assistants due to his rising commercial success. It is likely that he lived in one house and worked in the other. The purchases may have caused a strain; in around 1447 he seems to have encountered financial difficulties, and he was forced to remortgage the homes. Second mortgages were taken out in 1448.

=== Plague and death ===
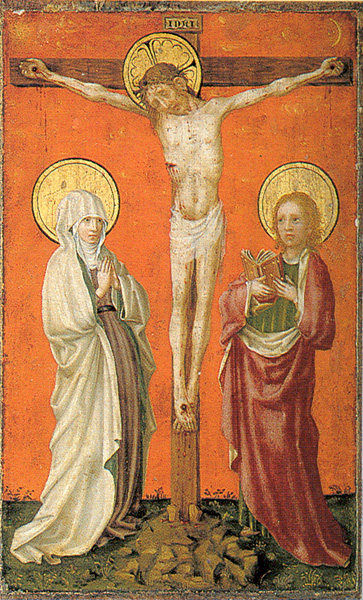
Crucifixion, 1445. Alte Pinakothek, Munich

In 1447 the local painter's guild elected Lochner as their representative municipal councillor, or Ratsherr. The appointment implies that he had lived in Cologne since at least 1437, as only those who had been living in the city for ten years could take up the position. He had not taken up citizenship immediately, possibly to avoid paying the 12 guilder fee. He was obliged to act as Ratsherr, and on 24 June 1447, he became a burgher of Cologne. The role of municipal councillor could only be held for a one-year term, with two years vacated before reoccupation. Lochner was re-elected for a second term in the winter of 1450–51 but died in office.

There was an outbreak of plague in 1451, and there are no surviving records of him after Christmas of that year. On 16 August 1451 the council of Meersburg was informed by officials in Cologne that Lochner would be unable to attend to the will and estate of his parents, recently deceased. It is presumed he was by then already ill; plague was widespread in the area. On 22 September Saint Alban parish requested permission to burn victims in the lot next to his house – there was no longer room in their cemetery. Lochner died sometime between this date and December 1451 when creditors took possession of his house. Records from 1451 do not mention Lysbeth, who was presumably already dead.

== Style ==
Lochner worked in the late International Gothic (schöner Stil) style, already considered dated and old-fashioned by the 1440s, yet is widely regarded as innovative. He introduced a number of progressions to painting in Cologne, especially by filling his backgrounds and landscapes with specific and elaborate details, and by rendering his figures with more bulk and volume. Wellesz described his paintings as evidencing an "intensity of feeling which gives a very special and very moving quality to his work. His devotion is reflected in his figures: it charges with symbolic meaning the smallest details of his paintings; and, in a hidden, almost magical way, it speaks from the concord of his pure and glowing colours."

Lochner painted with oil, preparing the surface in a way typical of other North German artists; in some works, he attached canvas to the panel support underneath the usual chalk ground. This was probably done where there were to be large areas of plain gilding. Where the gold ground was to have a pattern such as a brocade, this was carved into the chalk ground before gilding, and, in some paintings, elements had moulded additions applied to raise the surface to be gilded. He employed a number of techniques when gilding, to give different effects. These included laying the leaf with water for burnished passages, and with oil or varnish sizing (mordant gilding) for the more decorative areas. His colour schemes tend to be bright and luminous, filled with varieties of red, blue and green pigments. He often employed ultramarine, then expensive and difficult to source. His figures are regularly outlined with red paint. He was innovative in his rendering of flesh tones, which he built up using lead whites to give pale complexions with almost porcelain qualities. In this, he refers to an older tradition of indicating women of high nobility whose paleness was associated with a life spent indoors, "shielded from toiling in the fields, which was the lot of most". In particular, this technique follows the Master of Veronica, although the earlier painter's figures had an almost yellowish, ivory hue. Lochner's Madonnas tend to be clothed in saturated blues which resonate with surrounding yellow, red and green paint. According to James Snyder, the artist "employed these four basic colours for his harmonies", but went beyond by using more subdued and deep hues in a technique referred to as "pure colour".

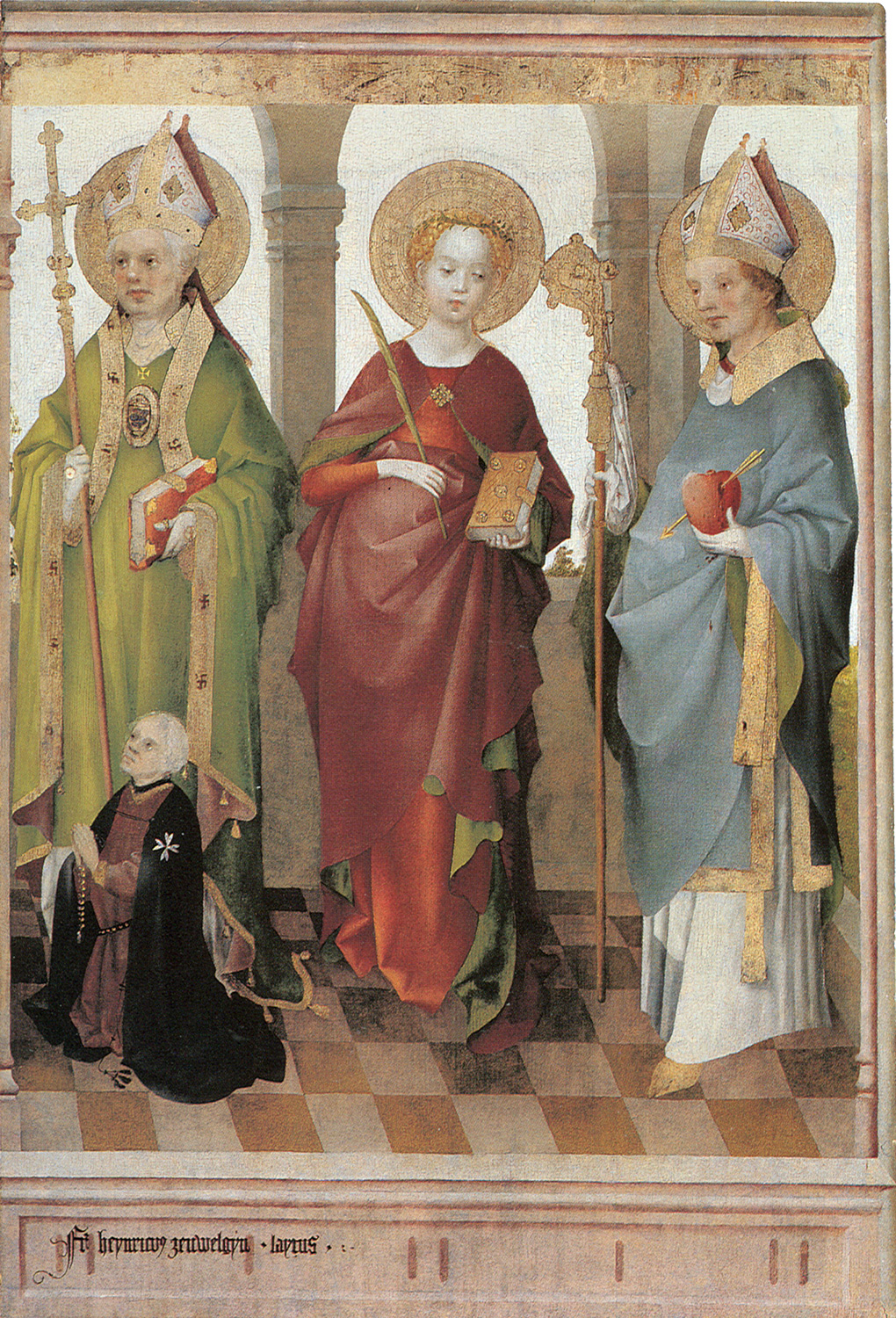
Saints Ambroise, Augustin et Cécile with the donor Heynricus Zeuwelgyn, c. 1450. Wallraf-Richartz-Museum, Cologne

Like Conrad von Soest, Lochner often applied black cross-hatching on gold, usually to render metallic objects such as brooches, crowns or buckles, in imitation of goldsmiths work on precious objects such as reliquaries and chalices. He was heavily influenced by the art and process of metalwork and goldsmithing, especially in his painting of gold grounds, and it has been suggested that he may have once trained as a goldsmith. Evidence of his imitation of elements of their craft is apparent even in his underdrawings. Notable and elaborate painted examples include the tooled gold border of the angelic concert in his Last Judgement, and Gabriel's clasp on the outer wing of the Dombild altarpiece.

Lochner seems to have prepared on paper before approaching his underdrawings; there is little evidence of reworking, even when positioning large groups of figures. Infrared reflectography of the underdrawings for the Last Judgement panels show letters used to denote the final colour to be applied, for example g for gelb (yellow) or w for weiss (white), and there are few deviations in the finished work. He often rearranged drapery fold lines or to denote perspective, enlarged or diminished the size of figures. The underdrawings reveal a draughtsman of skill, dynamism, and confidence; the figures appear fully formed with little evidence of reworking. Many are extremely detailed and precisely modelled, for example, St Ursula's brooch in the Altarpiece of the City Patron Saints, which contains closely detailed garlands and diadems.

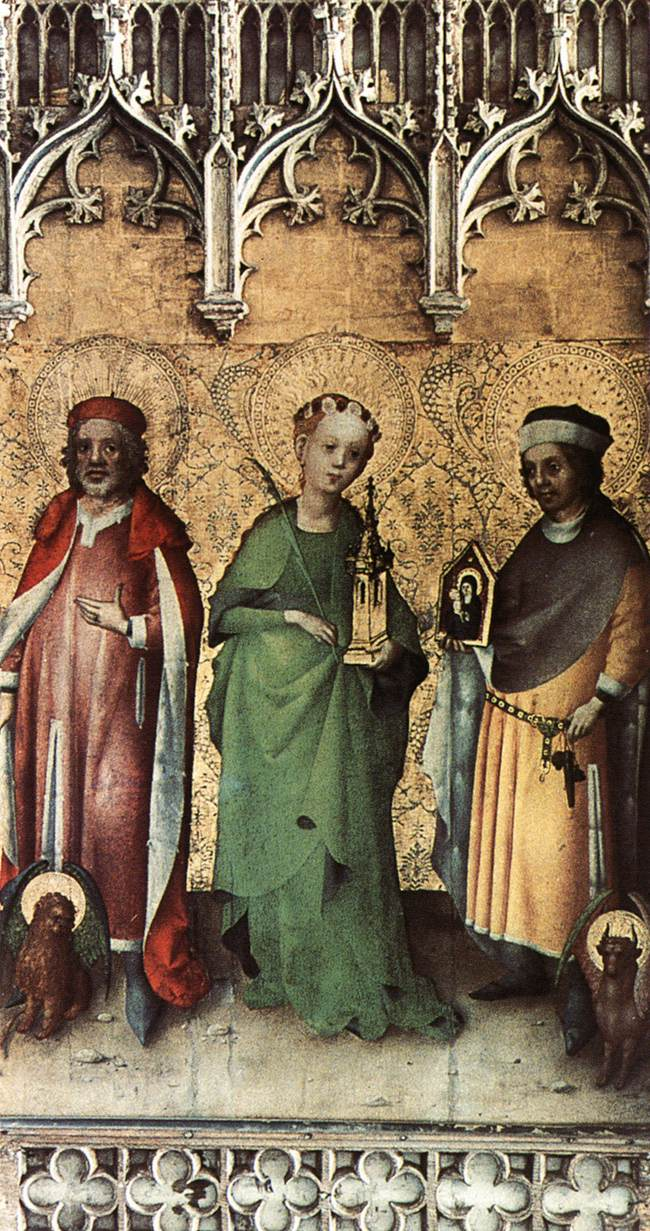
Saints Mark, Barbara and Luke, c. 1445–50. 100.5 x 58cm. Wallraf-Richartz Museum, Cologne

Perhaps influenced by van Eyck's Madonna in the Church, Lochner closely detailed the fall and gradient of light. According to the art historian Brigitte Corley, the clothes of "protagonists change their hues in delicate reaction to the influx of light, reds being transformed through a symphony of pink tonalities to a dusty greyish white, greens to a warm pale yellow, and lemon shading through oranges to a saturated red". Lochner employed the notion of supernatural illumination not just from van Eyck but also from von Soest's Crucifixion, where light emanating from Christ dissolves around John's red robe, as yellow rays eventually become white. There is a real possibility that a number of the faces of saints are modelled on historical persons, i.e. as donor portraits of the commissioners and their wives. Figures fitting this theory include St Ursula and St Gereon panels from the City Saints altarpiece.

Unlike the painters in the Low Countries, Lochner was not so concerned with delineating perspective; his pictures are often set in shallow space, while his backgrounds give little indication of distance and often dissolve into solid gold. Thus, and given his harmonious colour schemes, Lochner is usually described as one of the last exponents of the International Gothic. This is not to say his paintings lack contemporary northern sophistication; his arrangements are often innovative. The worlds he paints are hushed, according to Snyder, achieved with the symmetry of subdued use of colour and the often repeated stylistic element of circles. Angels form circles around the heavenly figures; the heavenly figures' heads are highly circular and they wear round haloes. According to Snyder, the viewer is slowly "drawn into empathy with the revolving forms".

Because of the paucity of surviving attributed works, it is difficult to detect any evolution in Lochner's style. Art historians are unsure if his style became progressively more or less influenced by Netherlandish art. Recent dendrochronological examination of attributed works indicate that his development was not linear, suggesting that the more advanced Presentation in the Temple is of 1445, predating the more Gothic Saints panels now divided between London and Cologne.

== Work ==
=== Panel paintings ===
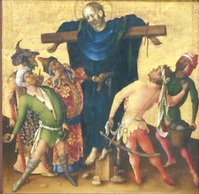
Martyrdom of St. Phillip, panel from the upper right of the "Martyrdom of the Apostles" wing of the Last Judgement, c. 1435

Lochner's major works include three large polyptychs: the Dombild Altarpiece; the Last Judgement, which is broken apart and in several collections; and Nuremberg's Crucifixion. Only two attributed paintings are dated; the 1445 Nativity now in the Alte Pinakothek, Munich, and the Presentation in the Temple from 1447, now in Darmstadt. There is a smaller, earlier version of the presentation scene at the Calouste Gulbenkian Foundation, Lisbon, dated 1445. As secular works grew in demand and religious works became unfashionable in later centuries, 15th-century polyptychs were often broken up and sold as individual works, especially if a panel or section contained an image that could pass as a secular portrait.

Wing panels and other fragments of Lochner's larger works are today spread across various museums and collections. Two surviving double-sided wing panels from an altarpiece with images of saints are in the London National Gallery and the Wallraf-Richartz Museum, Cologne (this is now sawn through so both sides can be displayed on a wall). The wings of the Last Judgement originally had six parts, painted on both sides, but have been sawn into twelve individual pictures, now divided between the Wallraf-Richartz Museum, the Alte Pinakothek in Munich and the Städel Museum in Frankfurt. It is probably from early in his career, but in subject matter and background differs from other extant and attributed works. While the elements are arranged in typical harmony, the composition and tone are unusually dark and dramatic. The Crucifixion is also an early work and reminiscent of late medieval painting. It has a heavily ornamented gilded background and the smooth flowing quality of the 'soft' Gothic style.

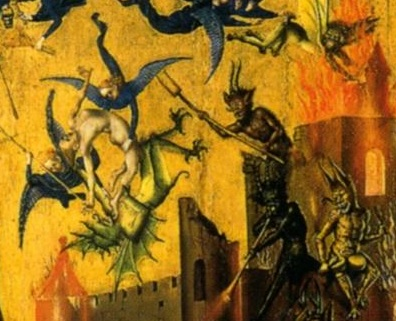
Last Judgement, detail c. 1435

The extant works repeatedly address the same scenes and themes. The nativity is recurrent, while several panels depict the Virgin and Child, often surrounded by a chorus of angels, or in earlier panels, blessed by a hovering representation of God or a dove (representing the Holy Ghost). In many instances Mary is enclosed in her usual enclosed garden. Several reveal the work of a number of hands, with weaker and less confident passages attributed to workshop members. The figures of Mary and Gabriel on the reverse of the Dombild were drawn more rapidly and with less skill than the figures on the main panels, and their drapery is modelled with, according to the art historian Julien Chapuis, a certain "stiffness", while the cross hatching "achieves no clear definition of relief". A number of drawings have been associated with him, but only one, a c. 1450 brush and ink on paper entitled Virgin and Child and now in the Musee du Louvre, is attributed with confidence.

=== Illuminated manuscripts ===
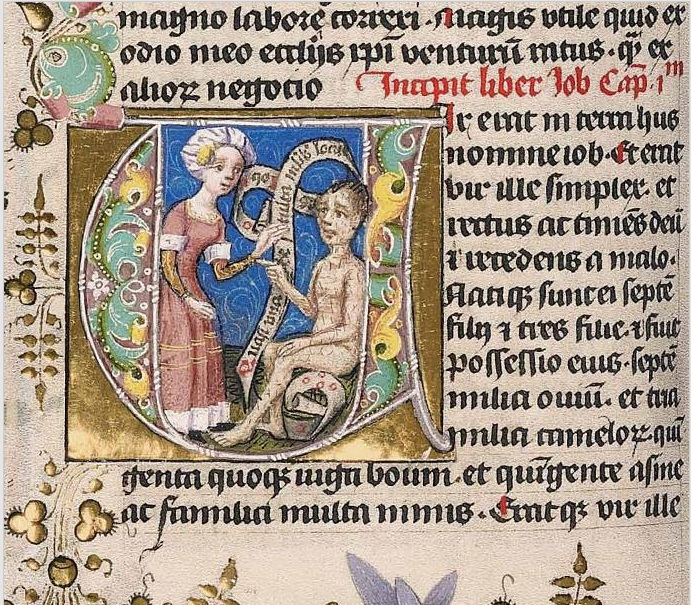
"Prayer book of Stephan Lochner", Job Derided by his Wife, c. 1450

Lochner is associated with three surviving books of hours; in Darmstadt, Berlin and Anholt. The extent of his association in each is debated; workshop members were probably heavily involved in their production. The most famous is the early 1450s Prayer book of Stephan Lochner now at Darmstadt; the others are the Berlin Book of Prayers of c. 1444, and the Anholt Prayerbook, completed in the 1450s. The manuscripts are very small (Berlin: 9.3 cm x 7 cm, Darmstadt: 10.7 cm x 8 cm, Anholt: 9 cm x 8 cm) and similar in layout and colourisation and are each extensively decorated in gold and blue. The borders are ornamented in bright colours and contain acanthus scrolls, gold foliage, flowers, berry-like fruits and round pods. The Darmstadt book includes a complete cycle of the Martyrdom of the Apostles. Its illustrations contain Lochner's characteristic application of deep blue, reminiscent of his Virgin in the Rose Garden.

The art historian Ingo Walther detects Lochner's hand in the "pious intimacy and soulfulness of the figures, always expressed so gently and elegantly, even in the extremely small format of the pictures". Chapuis agrees with the attribution, noting how many of the miniatures share thematic similarities to attributed panels. He writes that the illustrations "are not a peripheral phenomenon. On the contrary, they address several of the concerns articulated in Lochner's paintings and formulate them anew. There is little doubt that these exquisite images stem from the same mind." The text of the Darmstadt book is written in Cologne vernacular, the Berlin book in Latin.

=== Other formats ===
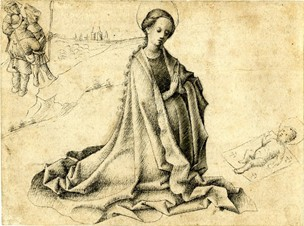
Follower or workshop of Stefan Locher, Virgin adoring the infant Christ, pen and black ink on paper. British Museum, 1445

There are extant liturgical vestments containing embroidered figures, including that of St. Barbara, in Lochner's style and with similar facial types. This has led to some speculation whether Lochner provided the models. In addition, a number of contemporary stained glass panels are similar in style, and there has been debate whether he might have been responsible for church murals; the over-life-size figures of the Dombild and Virgin with the Violet indicate his ability to work on a monumental scale.

Two drawings on paper in the British Museum and the École nationale supérieure des Beaux-Arts were at times thought to be copies for the Munich Nativity. The lines of the folds in the garments closely match those of the painting, although the technical ability does not. The Paris drawing has blotches of paint indicating that it was a study piece for workshop members. The London piece is superior, but its lines are more rigid, lacking Lochner's fluidity, and so its attribution has been relegated to a draughtsman closely associated with Lochner.

== Influences ==
Conrad von Soest: St. Dorothea (diptych), c. 1420. Westphalian State Museum, Münster

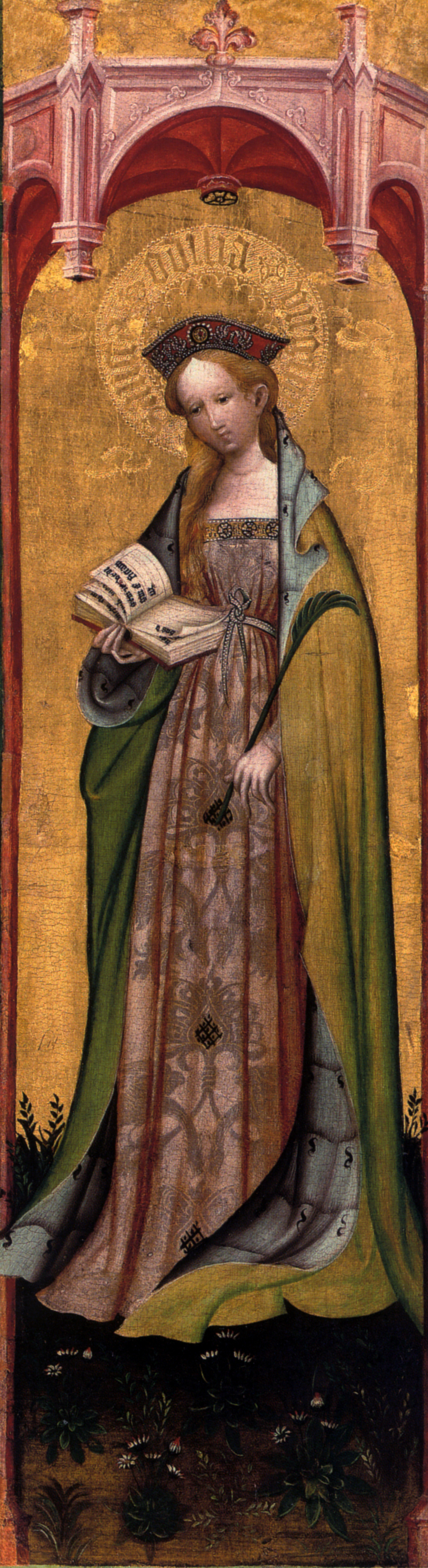
von Soest, St. Odilia (diptych), c. 1420

Lochner's art seems indebted to two broad sources; Netherlandish artists van Eyck and Robert Campin, and the earlier German masters Conrad von Soest and the Master of Saint Veronica. From the former Lochner drew his realism in depicting naturalistic backgrounds, objects, and clothes. From the latter, he adopted the somewhat antiquated manner of depicting figures, especially females, with doll-like, eloquent and sensitive features to present "iconic, almost timeless" atmospheres enhanced by the then old-fashioned gold backgrounds. Lochner's figures have idealised facial features typical of medieval portraiture. His subjects, females in particular, usually have high foreheads, long noses, small rounded chins, tucked blond curls and prominent ears typical of the late Gothic, giving them the characteristic monumentality of 13th-century art, placing them on seemingly similar shallow backgrounds.

Lochner probably saw van Eyck's c. 1432 Ghent Altarpiece during his visit to the Netherlands and seems to have borrowed a number of its compositional elements. The similarities include the manner in which the figures engage with their space and the emphasis on and rendering of elements such as brocades, gems and metals. Some figures in Lochner's paintings are directly borrowed from Ghent, and a number of facial features match those seen in van Eyck. His Virgin with the Violet has often been compared to van Eyck's 1439 Virgin at the Fountain. Similarly to those in van Eyck's work, Lochner's angels often sing or play musical instruments, including lutes and organs.

He seemingly rejected some aspects of van Eyckian realism, notably in his depictions of shadows, and his unwillingness to apply transparent glazes. As a colourist, Lochner was more inclined towards the International Gothic style, even if this inhibited realism. He did not utilise the newly developed Netherlandish techniques of representing perspective, but rather indicated distance through the diminution of parallel objects.

== Legacy ==
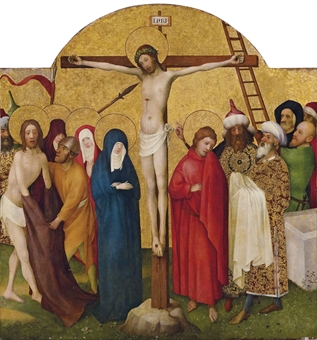
Crucifixion, Master of the Heisterbach Altar, mid 15th c.

The historical evidence suggests that Lochner's paintings were well known and widely copied during his lifetime, and remained so until the 16th century. Early examples in ink after his Virgin in Adoration are in the British Museum and École nationale supérieure des Beaux-Arts. The influence of Lochner's Last Judgement can be seen in Hans Memling's Gdansk Altarpiece, where the gates of Heaven are similar, as is the rendering of the blessed. Albrecht Dürer knew of him before his stay in Cologne, and Van der Weyden saw his paintings during his travel to Italy. The latter's Saint John Altarpiece is similar to Lochner's Flaying of Bartholomew, especially in the executioner's pose, while his Saint Columba Altarpiece includes two motifs from Lochner's Adoration of the Magi triptych; specifically, the king in the central panel with his back to the viewer, and the girl in the right-hand wing holding a basket containing doves.

The Heisterbach Altarpiece, a dismantled double set of wings now broken apart and divided between Bamberg and Cologne, is heavily indebted to Lochner's style. The inner panels show sixteen scenes from the lives of Christ and of the Virgin that bear multiple similarities to Lochner's work, including in format, compositional motifs, physiognomy and colourisation. The work was for a period attributed to Lochner but is now generally accepted as bearing his strong influence. In 1954 Alfred Stange described the Master of the Heisterbach Altarpiece as Lochner's "best-known and most important pupil and follower", although research in 2014 indicates that the two may have collaborated on the panels.

Research in 2014 by Iris Schaeffer into the underdrawings of the Dombild Altarpiece established two guiding hands, presumably Lochner and an exceptionally talented pupil, whom she concludes was in probability the principal artist behind the Heisterbach Altarpiece. A counter view is that Lochner's workshop was producing to a deadline, and he delegated as a matter of expediency.

== Gallery ==
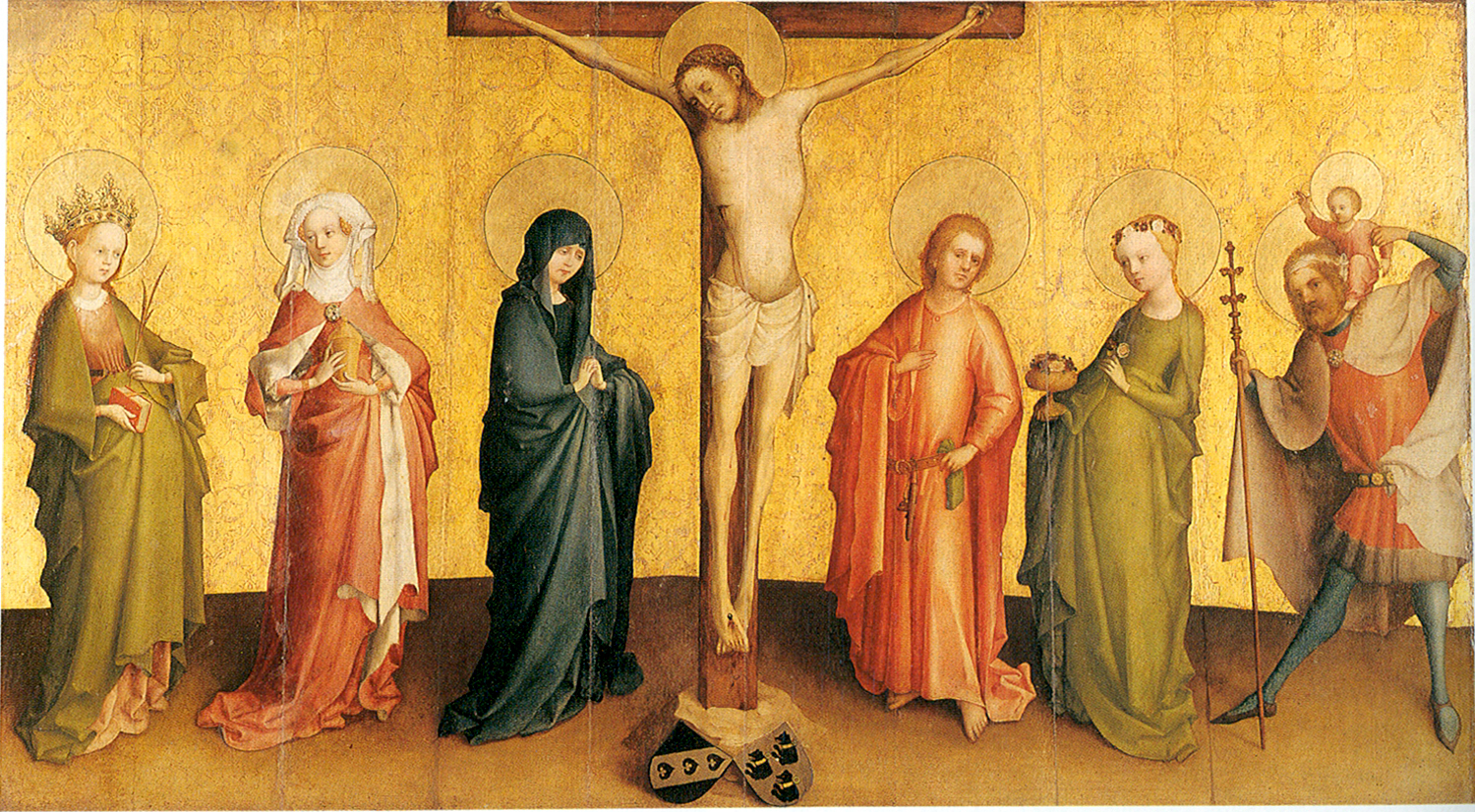
Crucifixion with Saints, 107.5 x 190.3 cm. Alte Pinakothek, Munich

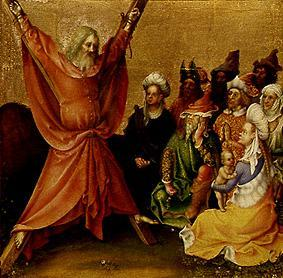
"Martyrdom of Andrew the Apostle", Martyrdom of the Apostles, c. 1435–40, Städel, Frankfurt

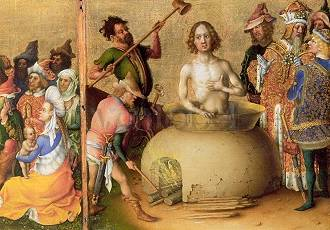
"Martyrdom of Saint John", Martyrdom of the Apostles, c. 1435–40, Städel, Frankfurt

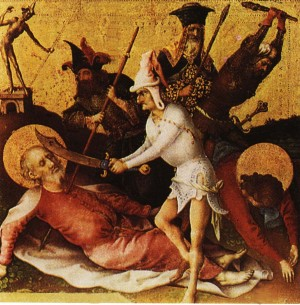
"Martyrdoms of Simon the Zealot and Jude the Apostle", Martyrdom of the Apostles, c. 1435–40, Städel, Frankfurt

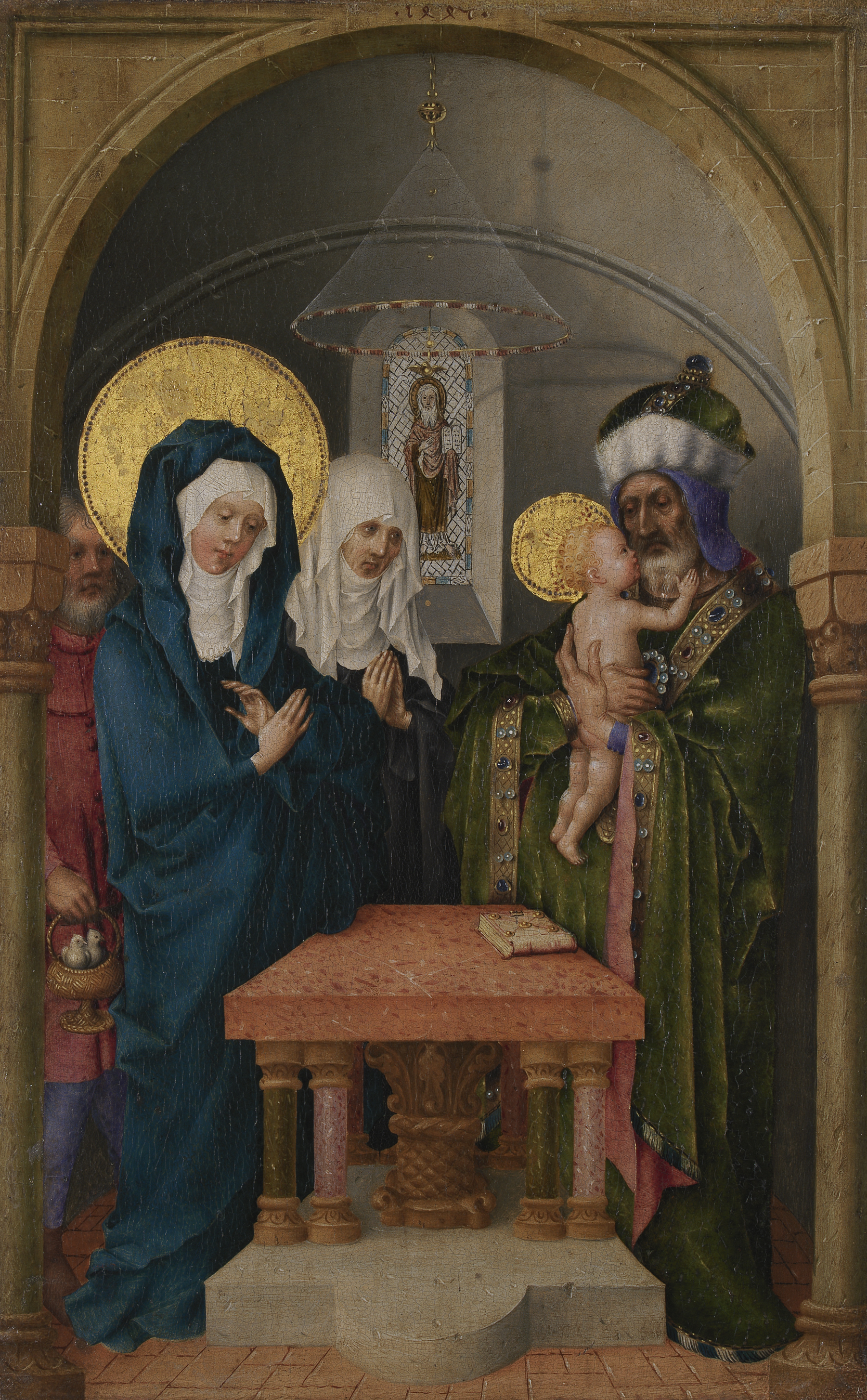
Presentation of Christ in the Temple, c. 1445, 37.6 x 23.7 cm. Reverse of the Crucifixion. Calouste Gulbenkian Foundation, Lisbon

Presentation of Christ in the Temple, c. 1447. Hessisches Landesmuseum Darmstadt

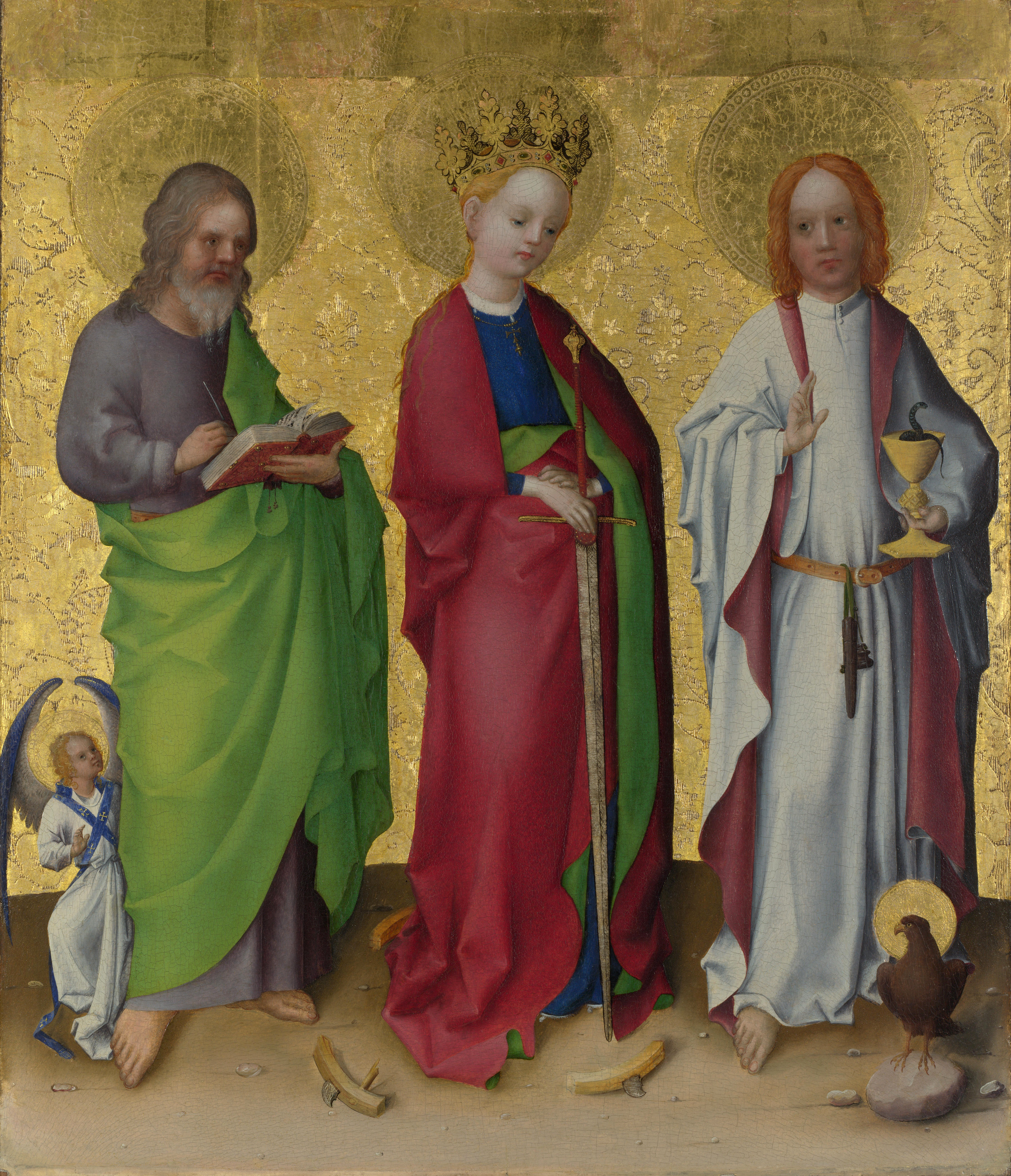
Three Saints (Matthew, Catherine of Alexandria and John the Evangelist), c. 1450. National Gallery, London

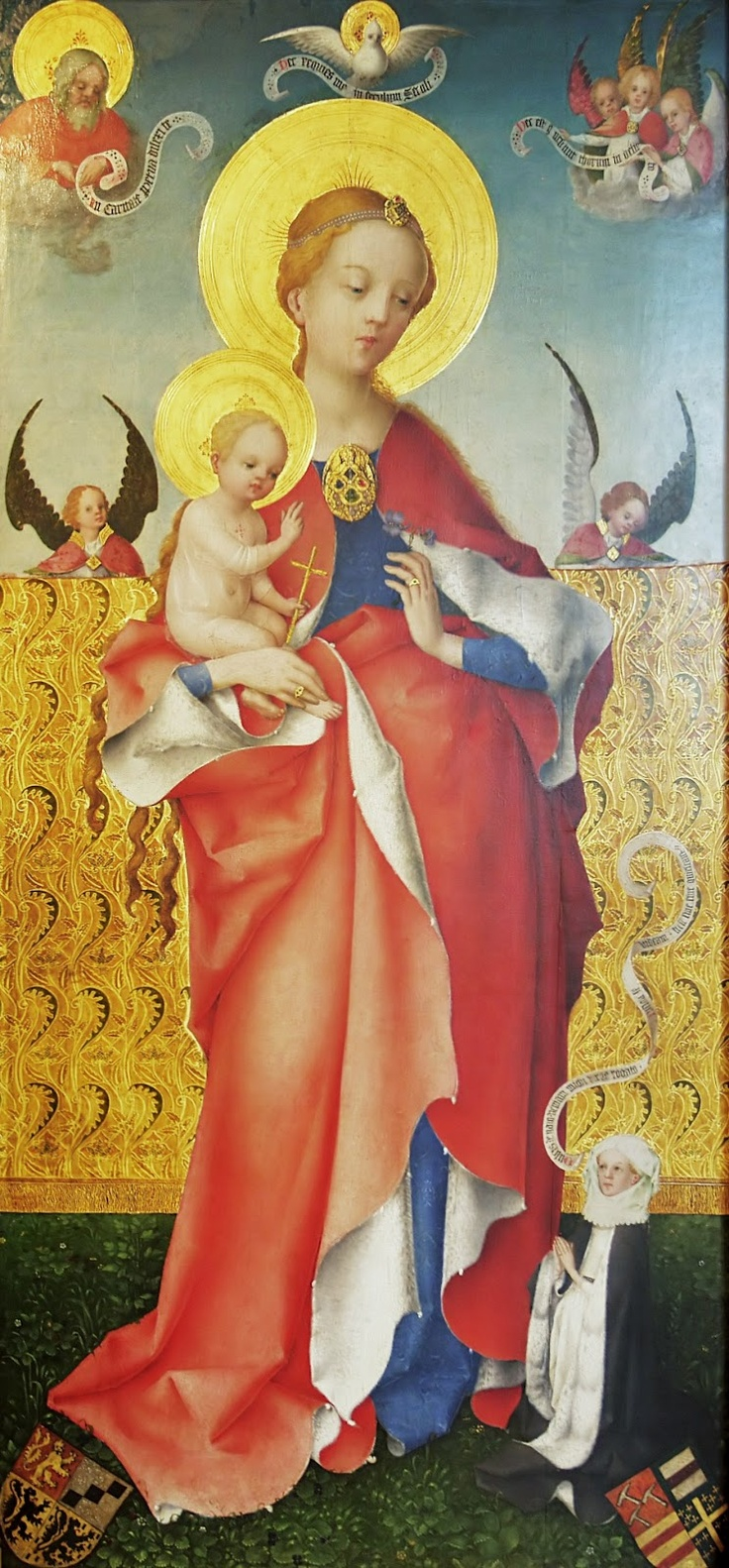
Virgin with the Violet, before 1450, 121.5 x 102 cm. Kolumba Museum, Cologne

== Sources ==
- "Billinge A": Billinge, Rachel; Campbell, Lorne; Dunkerton, Jill; Foister, Susan. "A double-sided panel by Stephan Lochner". National Gallery Technical Bulletin, No. 18, 1997
- Billinge B": Billinge, Rachel; Campbell, Lorne; Dunkerton, Jill; Foister, Susan, et al., "Methods and Materials of Northern European Painting in the National Gallery, 1400–1550". National Gallery Technical Bulletin Vol 18, pp. 6–55, 1997, online text
- Borchert, Till-Holger. Van Eyck to Dürer. London: Thames & Hudson, 2011. ISBN 978-0-500-23883-7
- Campbell, Lorne. The Fifteenth-Century Netherlandish Paintings. London: National Gallery, 1998. ISBN 978-0-300-07701-8
- Chapuis, Julien. Stefan Lochner: Image Making in Fifteenth-Century Cologne. Turnhout: Brepols, 2004. ISBN 978-2-503-50567-1
- Chilvers, Ian. The Oxford Dictionary of Art and Artists. Oxford: Oxford University Press, 2009. ISBN 978-0-19-953294-0
- Corley, Brigitte. "A Plausible Provenance for Stefan Lochner?". Zeitschrift für Kunstgeschichte, Volume 59, 1996
- Emmerson, Richard K. Key Figures in Medieval Europe. London: Routledge, 2005. ISBN 978-0-415-97385-4
- Kenney, Theresa. The Christ Child in Medieval Culture. Toronto: University of Toronto Press, 2012. ISBN 978-0-8020-9894-8
- Nash, Susie. Northern Renaissance art. Oxford: Oxford University Press, 2008. ISBN 978-0-19-284269-5
- O'Neill, Robert Keating. The Art of the Book from the Early Middle Ages to the Renaissance. MA: John J. Burns Library, 2000
- Richardson, Carol. Locating Renaissance Art: Renaissance Art Reconsidered. New Haven, CT: Yale University Press, 2007. ISBN 978-0-300-12188-9
- Ridderbos, Bernhard; Van Buren, Anne; Van Veen, Henk. Early Netherlandish Paintings: Rediscovery, Reception and Research. Amsterdam: Amsterdam University Press, 2005. ISBN 978-0-89236-816-7
- Rowlands, John. The Age of Dürer and Holbein: German Drawings 1400–1550. London: British Museum Publications, 1988. ISBN 978-0-7141-1639-6
- Schaefer, Iris; Von Saint-George, Caroline. "New Findings Concerning the Underdrawing of Stefan Lochner's Altarpiece of the City Patron Saints in Cologne Cathedral". Kölner Domblatt, Volume 79, 2014
- Schmid, Wolfgang; Holladay, Joan. "Reviewed: 'Painting and Patronage in Cologne, 1300–1500' by Brigitte Corley". Speculum, Volume 78, No. 2, 2003
- Singer, Hans W. Stories of the German Artists. Wildside Press, 2010. ISBN 978-1-4344-0687-3
- Smith, Jeffrey Chipps. The Northern Renaissance (Art and Ideas). London: Phaidon Press, 2004. ISBN 978-0-7148-3867-0
- Snyder, James. Northern Renaissance Art. Englewood Cliffs, NJ: Prentice-Hall, 1985. ISBN 978-0-13-183348-7
- Stechow, Wolfgang. "A Youthful Work by Stephan Lochner". The Bulletin of the Cleveland Museum of Art, Volume 55, No. 10, 1968
- Walther, Ingo. Codices Illustres: The World's most famous Illuminated Manuscripts. Berlin: Taschen, 2014. ISBN 978-3-8365-5379-7
- Wellesz, Emmy. The Masters, 76: Stephan Lochner. London: Fratelli Fabbri, 1963
- Wolfson, Michael. "Hat Dürer das 'Dombild' gesehen?". Zeitschrift für Kunstgeschichte, Volume 49, 1986
- Unverfehrt, Gerd. Da sah ich viel köstliche Dinge: Albrecht Dürers Reise in die Niederlande. Göttingen: Vandenhoeck & Ruprecht, 2007. ISBN 978-3-525-47010-7
