= Adoration of the Magi Altarpiece (Lochner) =

Triptych by Stefan Lochner

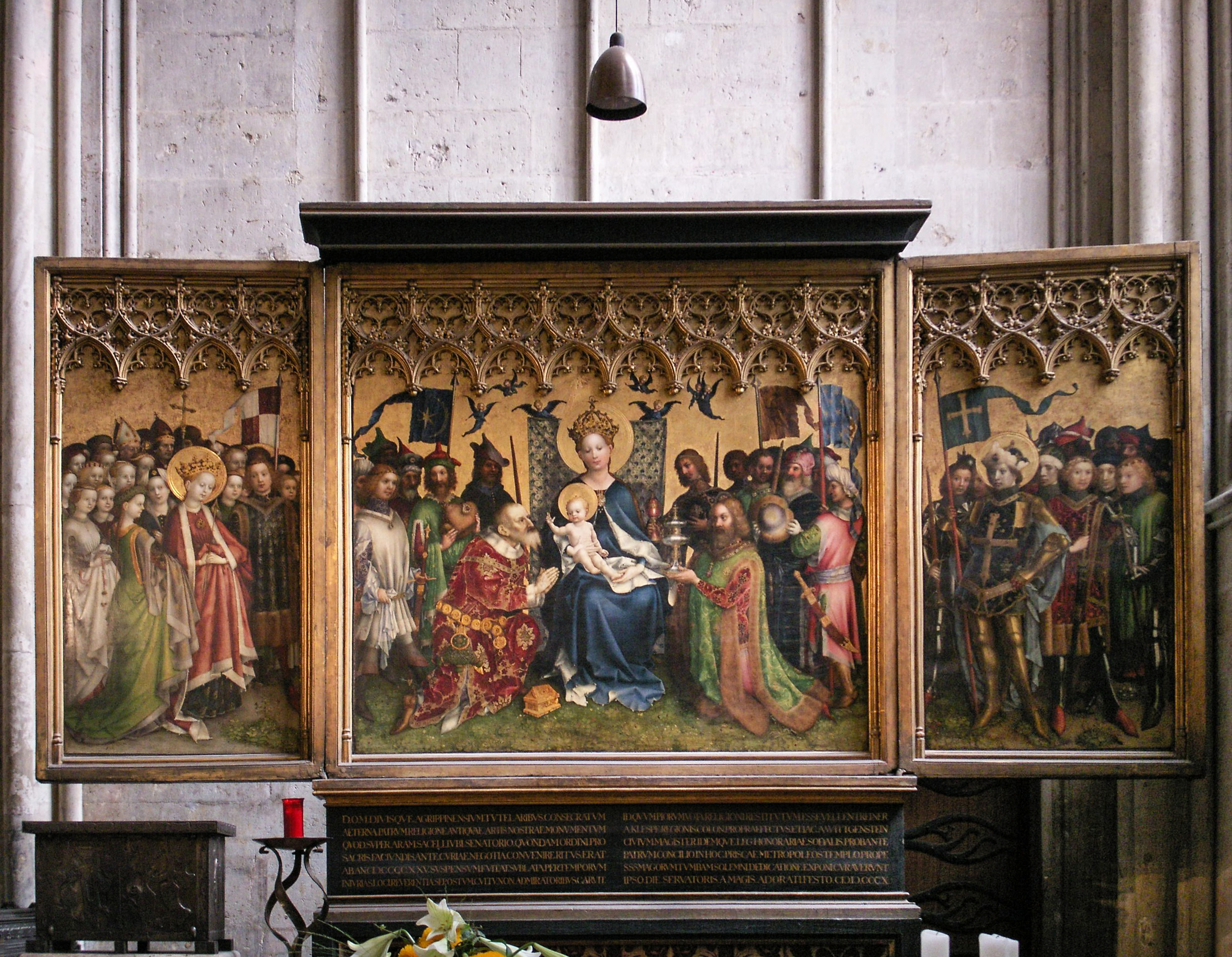
The altarpiece.

The Adoration of the Magi Altarpiece (also known as Dombild Altarpiece, or Kölner Dombild; German for "Cologne cathedral picture/painting") is a painted triptych by the German artist Stefan Lochner, created c. 1440–1442. Originally painted for the council-chapel St. Maria in Jerusalem in Cologne, it was moved to Cologne Cathedral in 1810 and is now in that church's Marienkapelle, south of the choir. It is also known as the Three Kings Altarpiece (Dreikönigsaltar) and the Patron Saints of Cologne Altarpiece (Altar der Kölner Stadtpatrone).

== History ==
The first written mention of the painting is in the travel diaries of Albrecht Dürer, who saw it in 1520 whilst he was en route to the Netherlands, noting that he paid two Weißpfennig to see a painting by "Master Steffan of Cologne".

The altarpiece's original location, St. Maria in Jerusalem, replaced a former Jewish synagogue. This happened the year after the expulsion of all Jews from Cologne in 1423, and an earlier 1349 pogrom that had damaged the synagogue. The altarpiece originally sat on the stone base used to support the synagogue's Torah ark.

On 3 April 2025, the Cologne Cathedral announced that a mural by Andrea Büttner would soon be painted on the wall behind the Adoration of the Magi Altarpiece. Büttner designed a life-size realistic painting of the Torah ark's stone base that the altarpiece had rested on, but now painted so the base appears to float above the altarpiece. The mural is designed to counter the overwriting of Jewish history in Cologne, and was the winner of the Cologne Cathedral International Art Competition, which aimed to add art on Jewish-Christian relations to the cathedral. Büttner stated that she wanted her piece to "take something that has been hidden from the cathedral's visitors up to now and have it openly displayed in a central location."

== Imagery ==
The altarpiece centres on the Three Kings, whose relics were in Cologne. The central panel is 260 x 285 cm, whilst each of the side panels is 260 by 142 cm. On the left panel is Ursula of Cologne with some of the 11,000 virgins with whom she was martyred, and on the right panel is St Gereon of Cologne.

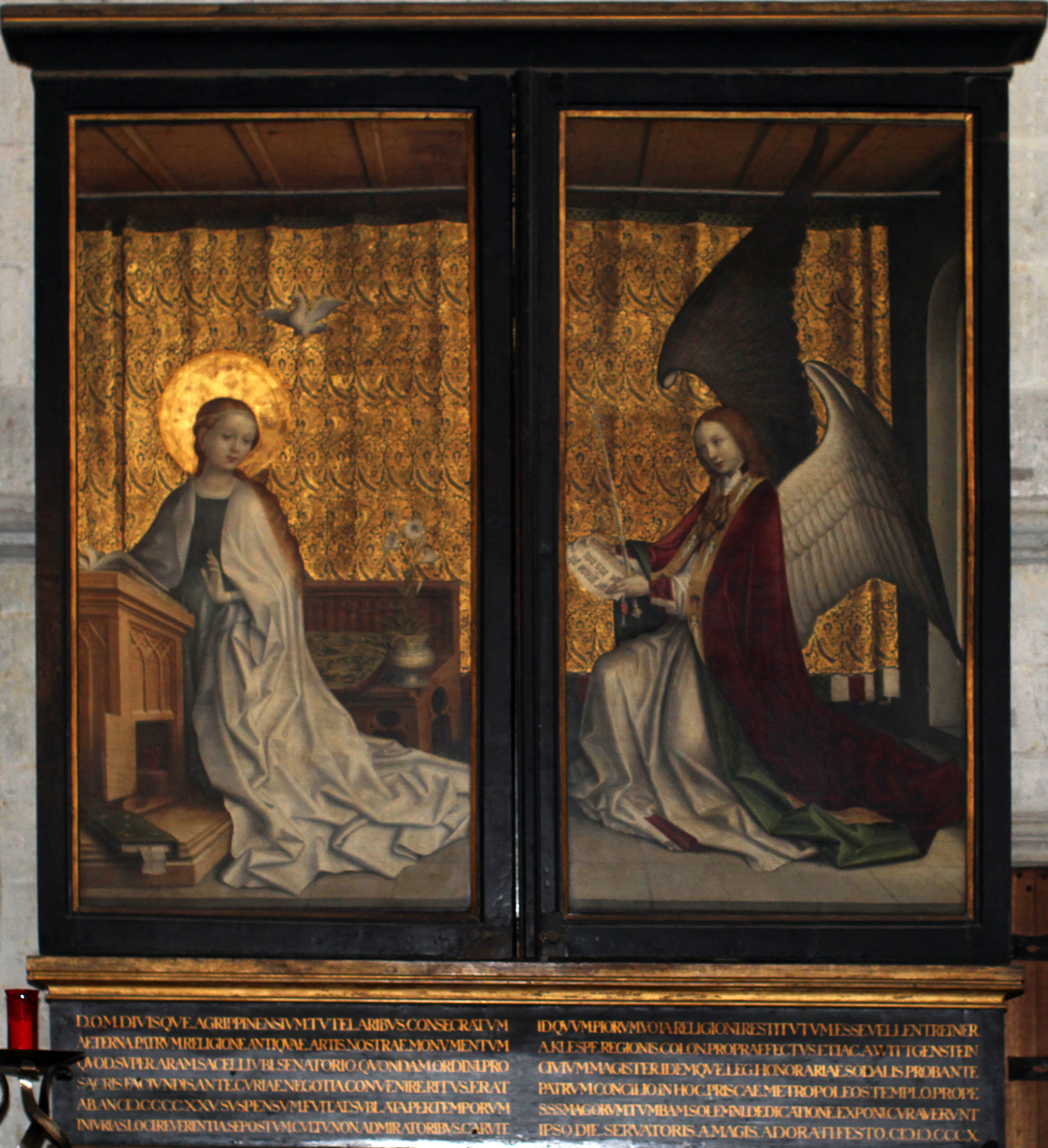
Closed shutters with Annunciation scene

When the altarpiece is closed, the reverse of the two side panels show an Annunciation scene.

== Legacy ==
German writers referenced the altarpiece once it had been moved to the Cologne Cathedral. Johann Wolfgang von Goethe wrote about the altarpiece several times, believing it to be one of the most important pieces of art from the Middle Ages. Johanna Schopenhauer also named it a masterpiece, writing that its painter earned immortality. Heinrich Heine referenced the altarpiece and Cologne Cathedral in an 1822 poem, later composed into a song by Robert Schumann.

== Sources ==
- Chapuis, Julien. Stefan Lochner: Image Making in Fifteenth-Century Cologne. Turnhout: Brepols, 2004. ISBN 978-2-5035-0567-1
- Krüger, Renate. Old German Panel Painting. Berlin, 1974
- Wellesz, Emmy; Rothenstein, John (ed). Stephan Lochner. London: Fratelli Fabbri, 1963

== Bibliography ==
- Virdis, Caterina Limentani; Pietrogiovanna, Mari; Bauer-Eberhardt, Ulrike (2002). Flügelaltäre : bemalte Polyptychen der Gotik und Renaissance (in German). München: Hirmer. ISBN 3-7774-9520-4. OCLC 66200170.
- Comes, Elisabeth Margarete (2013). Ein Garten Eden die Pflanzen auf Stefan Lochners Altar der Stadtpatrone (in German). Berlin. ISBN 978-3-89479-714-0. OCLC 828793489.
