= Annunciation (Lochner) =

Painting by Stefan Lochner

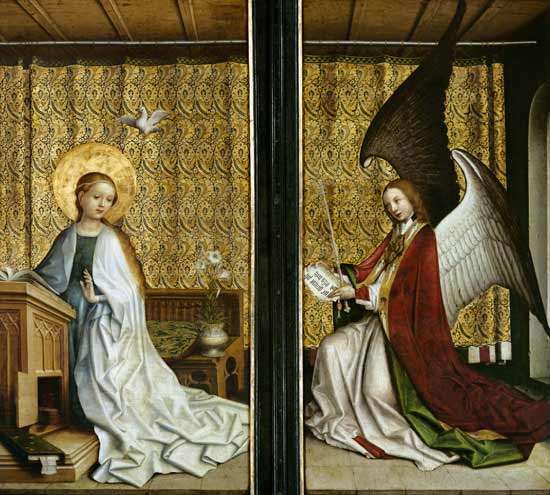
Annunciation, 48.25 x 67.5in, Cologne Cathedral, Cologne

Annunciation (or The Virgin Mary) is a panel painting by the German artist Stefan Lochner, from c. 1446-1449. The panels were probably conceived as an outer wing for a lost altarpiece. It shows the virgin, rather conventionally receiving the voice of the Holy Spirit, who hovers above her in the form of a dove. A vase behind her holds a lily. Her white clothes and the flower represent her virginity. It seems influenced by similar panels found in Jan van Eyck's Ghent Altarpiece.

== Sources ==
- Chapuis, Julien. Stefan Lochner: Image Making in Fifteenth-Century Cologne. Turnhout: Brepols, 2004. ISBN 978-2-5035-0567-1
- Wellesz, Emmy; Rothenstein, John (ed). Stephan Lochner. London: Fratelli Fabbri, 1963
