= Master of the Heisterbach Altarpiece =

German painter

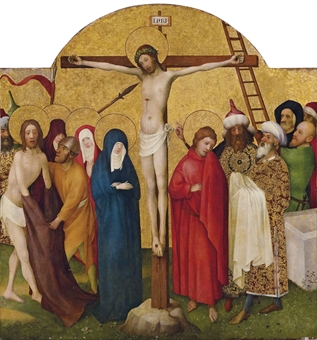
Crucifixion, Master of the Heisterbach Altar, mid 15th c

The Master of the Heisterbach Altarpiece was a German painter active around Cologne between 1440 and 1460.

== Style ==
The work of the Master of the Heisterbach Altarpiece shows traces of the influence of Stefan Lochner, duly following his compositional models and use of tone. The master may have been a member of Lochner's workshop.

The master is also attributed with an altarpiece from the parish of Saint Christopher in Colonia, dated to 1445 and now kept in the Alte Pinacoteck of Monaco. That work has a central piece Crucifixion with Six Apostles and the Virgin, around it are other apostles, and on the exterior Saints Christopher and Gereon.

The master's workshop, or that of Lochner, also produced two altar doors in Cologne's church to Saint Andrea. Its two remaining fragments are also kept in the Alte Pinacoteck.

== Name ==
The master's notname is derived from a c. 1445 apostolic altarpiece in the monastery of Heisterbach. The altarpiece was probably commissioned by the abbot Christiann, who died in 1448, and it is now mostly stored in the museum of Bamberg. It contains paintings of saints and apostles and 16 scenes from the life of Jesus Christ.

== Sources ==
- Chapuis, Julien. Stefan Lochner: Image Making in Fifteenth-Century Cologne. Turnhout: Brepols, 2004. ISBN 978-2-503-50567-1
