= St. Maria in Jerusalem =

Former church building in Cologne, Germany

Coordinates: 50°56′18″N 6°57′32″E

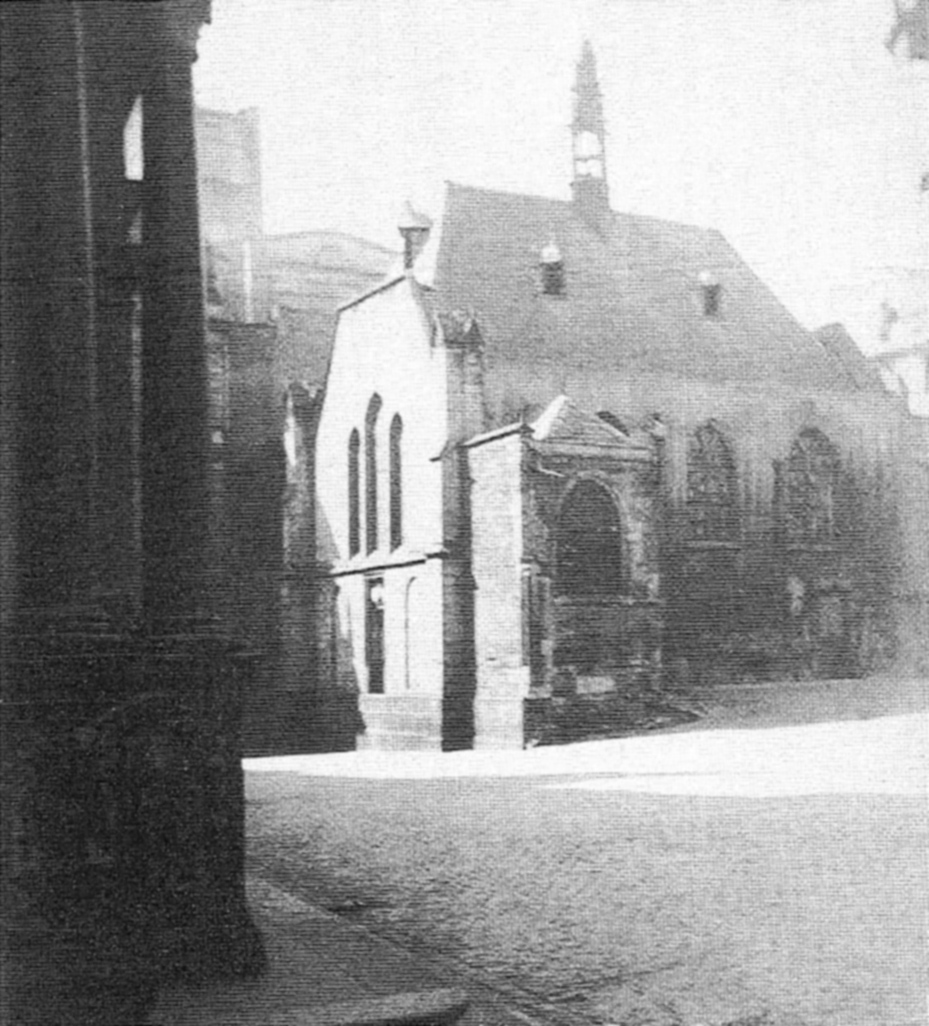
The chapel from the north-east

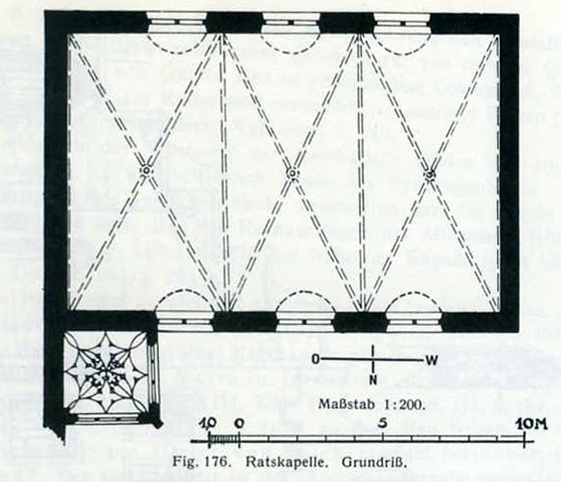
Floor plan

St. Maria in Jerusalem was a chapel for the city council of Cologne in Germany. It was built between 1424 and 1426 when the Michaelskapelle over the market gate began to prove too small. It was secularised and deconsecrated during the French Revolutionary Wars and destroyed in bombing during World War II.
