= Prayer book of Stephan Lochner =

Manuscript attributed to Stefan Lochner

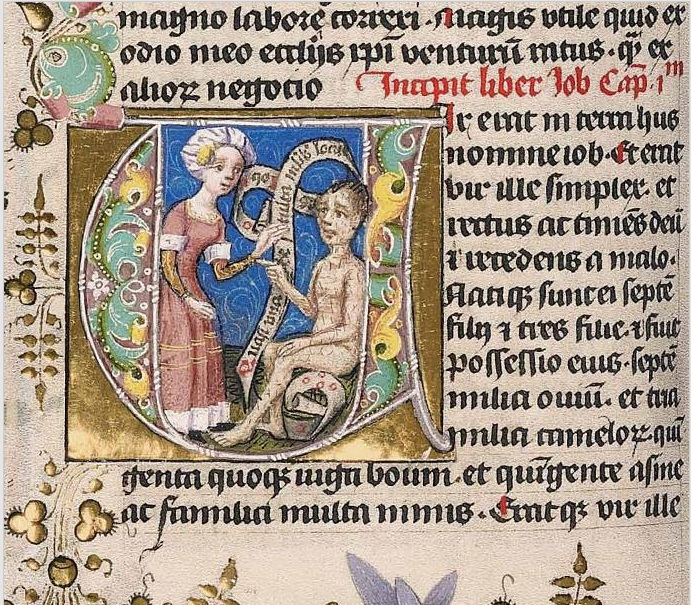
Job Derided by his Wife, c 1450

The Prayer book of Stefan Lochner (German: Gebetbuch des Stephan Lochner) is an illuminated manuscript attributed to the German artist Stefan Lochner in the RheinMain University and State Library. Dated to the early 1450s, the Book of hours consists of 235 leaves, each folio measuring 108 x 80mm. The extent of Lochner's involvement is debated; workshop members were probably heavily engaged in its production. However, his style, or at least that of his followers, can be detected in the overall layout; the colourisation, vivid and harmonious flowers in the borders, and the delicate treatment of the foliage are all characteristic of his style.

The prayer book is one of, and the best preserved of, three surviving books of hours attributed to Lochner. His books are similar in layout and colourisation, and extensively decorated with gold and blue. The borders of the Prayer book are ornamented in bright colours and contain acanthus scrolls, gold foliage, flowers, berry-like fruits and round pods.

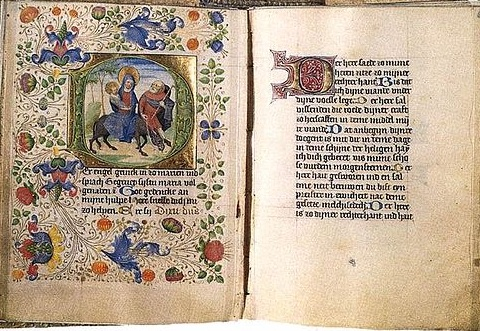
Flight into Egypt, 1451. The Virgin sits on a small donkey. Joseph holds the reins, and is depicted as good humoured, but bearded and rather crude.

Little is known of Lochner's life, we do not even know the year of his birth. Attribution of any of his works has been difficult. Art historian Ingo Walther detects Lochner's hand through the "pious intimacy and soulfulness of the figures, always expressed so gently and elegantly, even in the extremely small format of the pictures".

Chapuis agrees with the attribution, noting how many of the miniatures share thematic similarities to attributed panels. He writes that the illustrations "are not a peripheral phenomenon. On the contrary, they address several of the concerns articulated in Lochner's paintings and formulate them anew. There is little doubt that these exquisite images stem from the same mind."
