= Saint Columba Altarpiece =

Altarpiece painted by Rogier van der Weyden

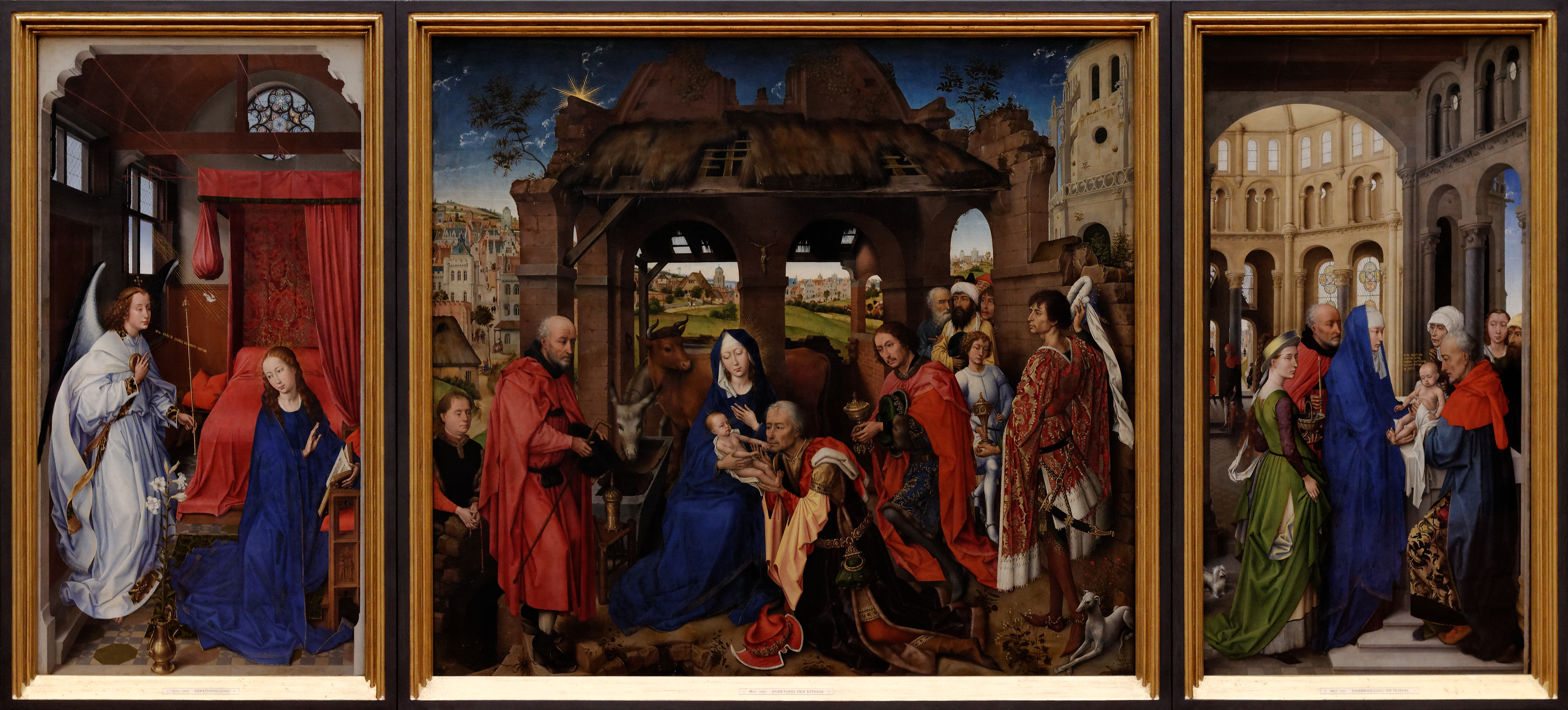
Rogier van der Weyden's St Columba Altarpiece. Oil on oak panel, 138 x 70 cm, 138 x 153 cm, 138 x 70. Alte Pinakothek, Munich

The Saint Columba Altarpiece (or Adoration of the Kings) is a large c. 1450–1455 oil-on-oak wood panel altarpiece by Early Netherlandish painter Rogier van der Weyden painted during his late period. It was commissioned for the church of St. Columba in Cologne, and is now in the Alte Pinakothek, Munich. It depict scenes from the early life of Jesus plus a crucifix with him on the cross. They show, from left to right, the Annunciation (when Mary is visited by the archangel Gabriel), the Adoration of the Magi (when she gives birth in a stable) and the Presentation, when she presents the infant at the Temple in Jerusalem. In each panel, Mary is distinguished by her blue clothes. The reverse of the exterior panels are covered with plain paint and lack indication that they ever contained donor portraits as were typical for the time.

The St. Columba church was founded in 1467 as a burial chapel: three years after van der Weyden's death. The triptych was frequently copied in the 15th and 16th centuries and inspired some of Hans Memling's works, among them the Jan Floreins Altarpiece. The work draws inspiration from Stefan Lochner's Altarpiece of the Patron Saints of Cologne (1440s), which Van der Weyden is known to have seen. The triptych was attributed to Jan van Eyck for a period in the 19th century.

== Panels ==
=== Annunciation ===
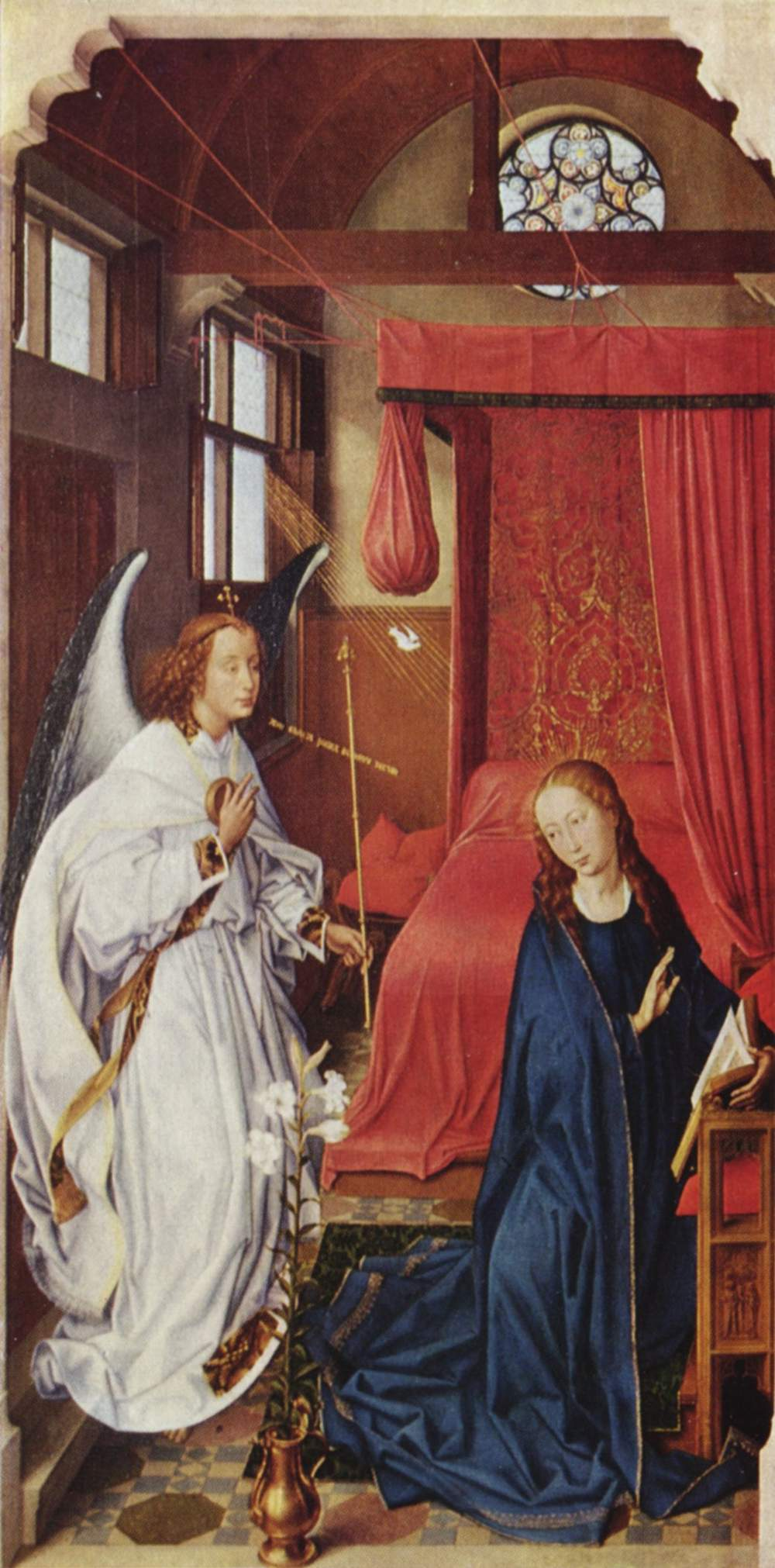
The Annunciation panel

The elegant Annunciation scene shows the archangel Gabriel announcing to Mary that she will conceive and bear Jesus. Mary is dressed in blue robes and kneels in her chamber before a bed draped with red sheets. Compared to the central panel, the figures are positioned within a shallow and narrow space that lacks depth. A number of theories have been proposed to explain this, including that the panel was heavily revised based on the existence of underdrawings possibly executed by workshop members, or that the artist based it on a drawing or prototype from earlier in his career.

The panel is filled with religious iconography. There is a faux carving of the fall of man on the side of the prie-dieu at which Mary kneels in her devotions. It is positioned so as it could be visible only to the viewer. The gold pot on the lower foreground is filled with lilies.

=== Adoration of the Magi ===
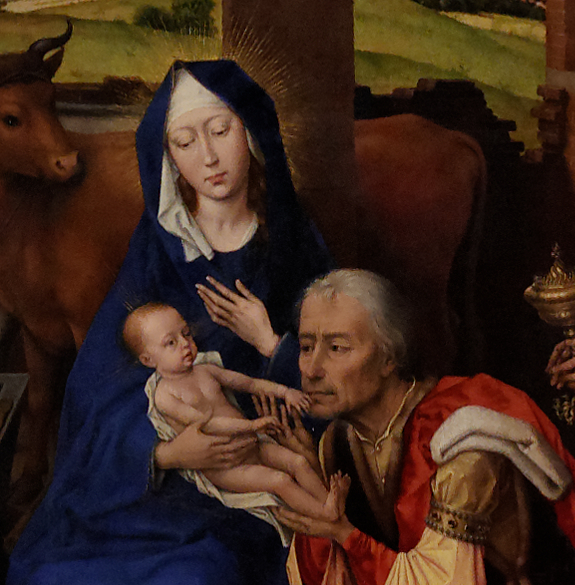
Detail

The central panel is dominated by the central figures of Mary and Saint Joseph, framed by the three Magi and their attendants to the right. The Magi are arranged in a descending, diagonal and rhythmic order, with the most senior of the kings kneeling to hold the Christ Child's feet while raising the child's hands to his lips. The stable seems to be in ruin, but has walls that connect to buildings in the foreground. The stable's central piller in the rear has a crucifix with Jesus hanging on the cross.

The donor is on the left of the panel, kneeling and cramped behind Joseph. He holds prayer beads and leans against the shed wall. He is depicted as a devout witness to the nativity, and is placed in front of the nearest part of a detailed and expansive cityscape that extends across the top portion of most of the panel. The city view on the panel's left contain a number of small figures walking along a steep pathway that winds downwards towards the stable. Goethe described this view of the city in 1816 as "full of streets and houses, bustle and industry."

A small crucifix hangs on the pillar behind Mary's head, even though the scene takes place 33–36 years before the death of Jesus Christ.

=== Presentation ===
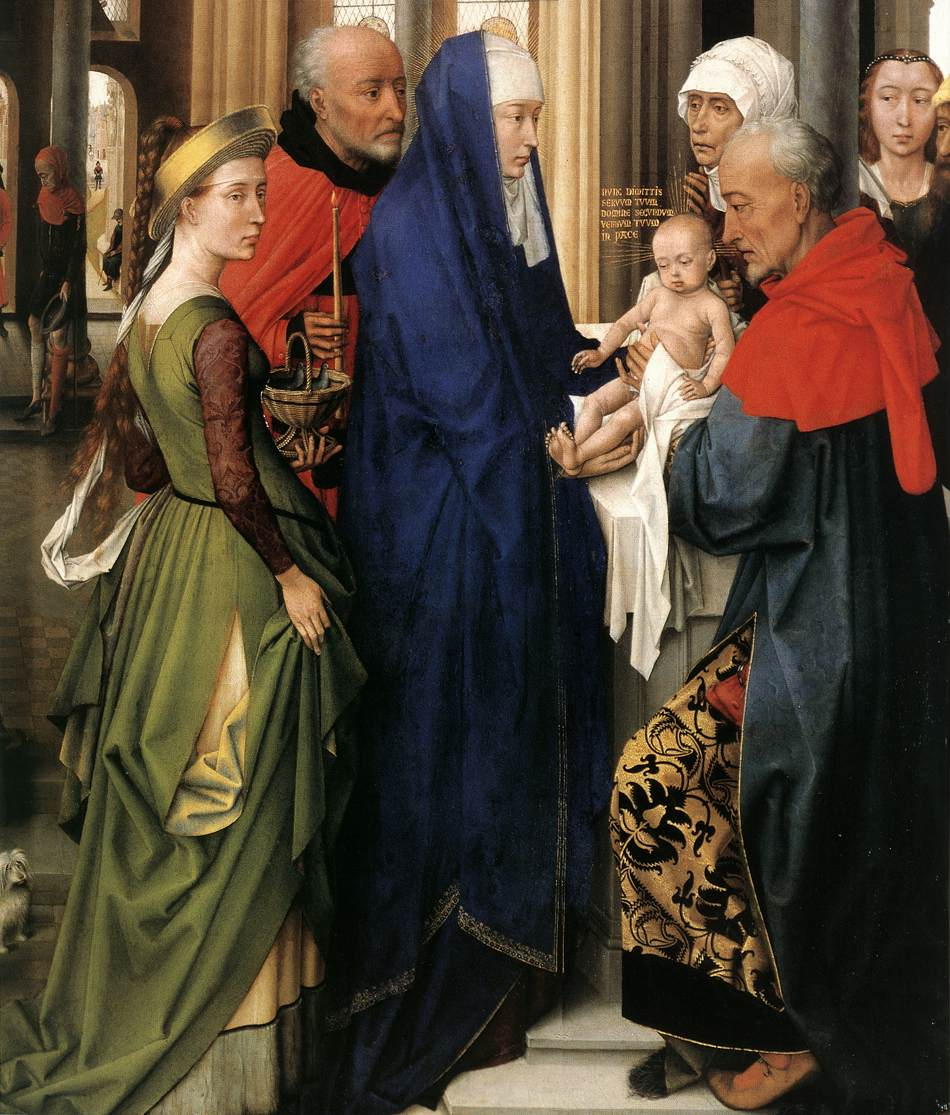
Detail from the presentation

The presentation takes place in the octagonal building's entrance, in an area surrounded by monumental arches, another bold and innovative use of space and perspective. The walls on the far right of the Adoration panel show the exterior of presentation's building, creating a jarring spatial and temporal juxtaposition: the stable is in Bethlehem, the Temple in Jerusalem, yet across the panels they co-exist, perhaps as a bridge between the Old and New Testaments. The innovation allows the narrative to flow in a continuous fashion across the altarpiece, a device also used in his c. 1452 Braque Triptych.

The buildings above the central part of the panel appear to be far more distant than those on the left, giving the impression that the city, which is presumably Bethlehem, is sharply receding into an increasingly remote horizon.

== Commission ==
The altarpiece was recorded in the 1801 inventory of Cologne's St. Kolumba church, where it resided in the von dem Wasservass family chapel, which was probably established in the 1460s by Goddert von dem Wasservass, burgomaster of Cologne. It is reasonable to assume such a prominent resident of the city commissioned the piece. According to Lorne Campbell, based on the number of known copies, the piece probably never left the private chapel until 1801. Sulpiz and Melchior Boisseree bought it in 1808; their collection was acquired in 1827 for the Alte Pinakothek in Munich.

== Sources ==
- Acres, Alfred. "Rogier van der Weyden's Painted Texts". Artibus et Historiae, Volume 21, No. 41, 2000
- Acres, Alfred. "The Columba Altarpiece and the Time of the World". The Art Bulletin, volume 80, No. 20, Sept. 1998. JSTOR 3051299
- Borchert, Till-Holger. "Hans Memling and Rogier van der Weyden". In: J. Chapuis (ed), Invention: Northern Renaissance Studies in honor of Molly Faries. Turnhout: Brepols, 2008. ISBN 978-2-503-52768-0
- Campbell, Lorne. Van der Weyden. New York: Harper and Row, 1980. ISBN 0-06-430650-X
- Ridderbos, Bernhard; Van Buren, Anne; Van Veen, Henk (eds). Early Netherlandish Paintings: Rediscovery, Reception and Research. Amsterdam: Amsterdam University Press, 2005. ISBN 0-89236-816-0
