= Cologne school =

Cologne School may refer to:

- Cologne school of painting, a medieval group of painters
- Cologne school (music), a late-20th-century group of composers and performers
