= William of Cologne =

German painter

William of Cologne (Wilhelm von Köln or Meister Wilhelm) was a medieval German painter active in Cologne and recorded in city charters between 1370 and 1390. He is regarded as the foremost artist of the Cologne School. No paintings can be attributed securely to him by him, though his name is used as a collective term for a series of altarpieces from late in the fourteenth century, whose main qualities are ardent piety and delicate grace, particularly in the characteristics of the female figures. Their formal aspects, however, remain within the prevailing Gothic style. Images of this kind may be found in museums and various churches in Cologne, Munich, Nuremberg, Frankfurt am Main and Berlin, and there is a plaque to him in the Walhalla temple.

== Bibliography ==
- Ludwig Scheibler and Carl Aldenhoven: Geschichte der Kölner Malerschule, in: Publikationen der Gesellschaft für Rheinische Geschichtskunde, Bd. 13, Köln, Bonn, Düsseldorf, 1902
