= Nazmiyal collection =

Coordinates: 40.74635°N 73.98324°W

J. Nazmiyal Inc DBA Nazmiyal Collection
- Industry: Antique Carpets; Textiles
- Founder: Jason Nazmiyal
- Headquarters: New York City, U.S.
- Website: Nazmiyalantiquerugs.com

The Nazmiyal Collection, based in New York City, is a company that buys, sells, repairs and restores antique and decorative carpets and textiles.

The Nazmiyal Collection was founded in 1980 by Jason Nazmiyal. The collection features a 5,000 square feet (460 m^{2}) gallery with carpets from Persia, Turkey, the Caucasus, China, Egypt, Europe, Morocco and the Americas, including rare carpets from the 16th century, and textiles from the 4th century.

Items in the collection have been used as backdrops in exhibitions of works by Paul Thek, an artist at the Whitney Museum.
