= Kolumba =

Art museum in Cologne

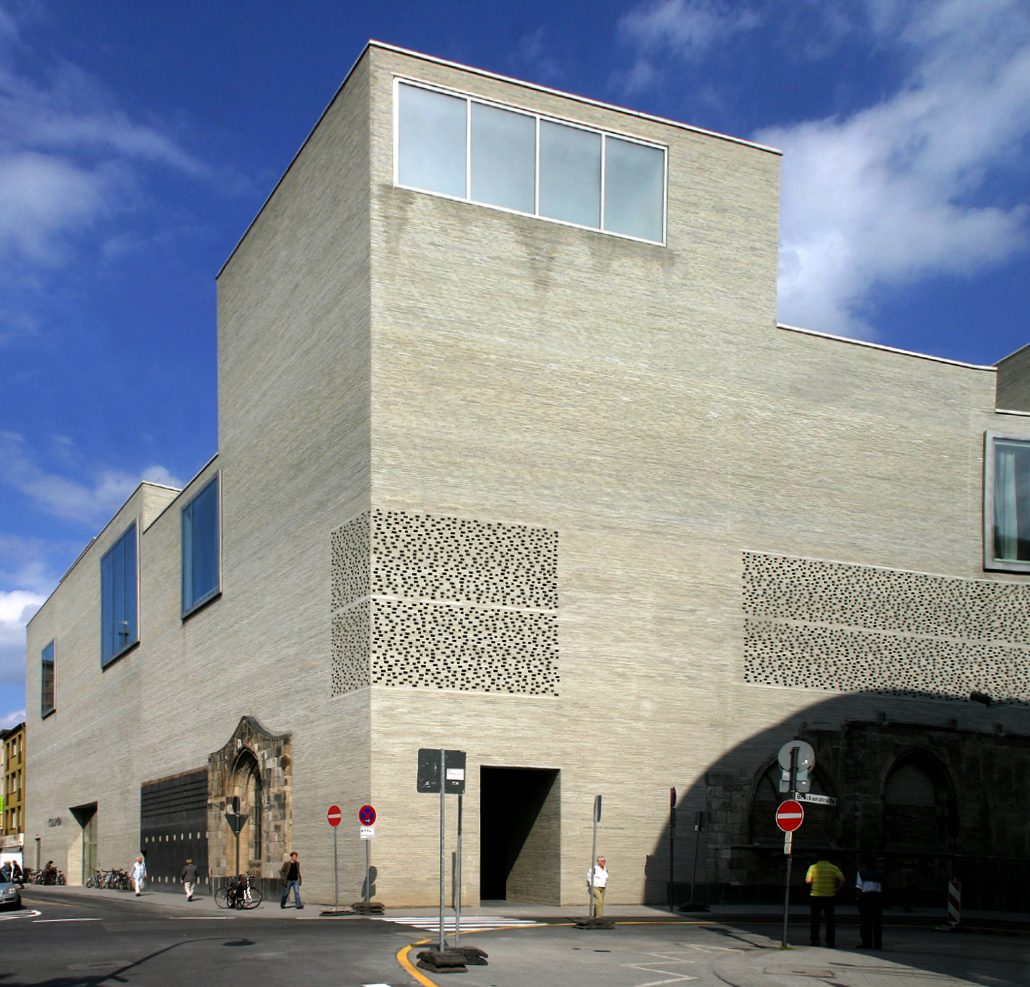
The Kolumba's new building.

Kolumba, Cologne

The Kolumba Museum (formerly the Diocesan Museum) is an art museum in Cologne, Germany, run by the Roman Catholic Archdiocese of Cologne. It is located at the historic site of the former St. Kolumba church, destroyed during World War II, and also includes the 1950 chapel "Madonna of the Ruins" by Gottfried Böhm.

== History ==
The museum was founded by the Society for Christian Art in 1853, and taken over by the Archdiocese of Cologne in 1989.

Until 2007 it was located near Cologne Cathedral. Its new home, built from 2003 to 2007, was designed by Peter Zumthor and inaugurated by Joachim Meisner. The site was originally occupied by the romanesque Church of St. Kolumba, which was destroyed in World War II and replaced in 1950 by a Gottfried Böhm chapel nicknamed the "Madonna of the Ruins".

The new structure Peter Zumthor built for the museum now shares its site with the ruins of the Gothic church and the 1950s chapel, wrapping a perforated grey brick facade like a cloak around both, the museum and old church. The sixteen exhibition rooms possess varying qualities with regard to incoming daylight, size, proportion, and pathways. The work on the project yielded the following reduction: light gray brick walls (Kolumba stones) and clay plaster, flooring made of Jura limestone, terrazzo, and mortar, ceilings made of a poured mortar shell, window frames, doors, casings and fittings of steel, wall paneling and furniture of wood, textiles and leather, curtains of leather and silk.

== Architecture ==
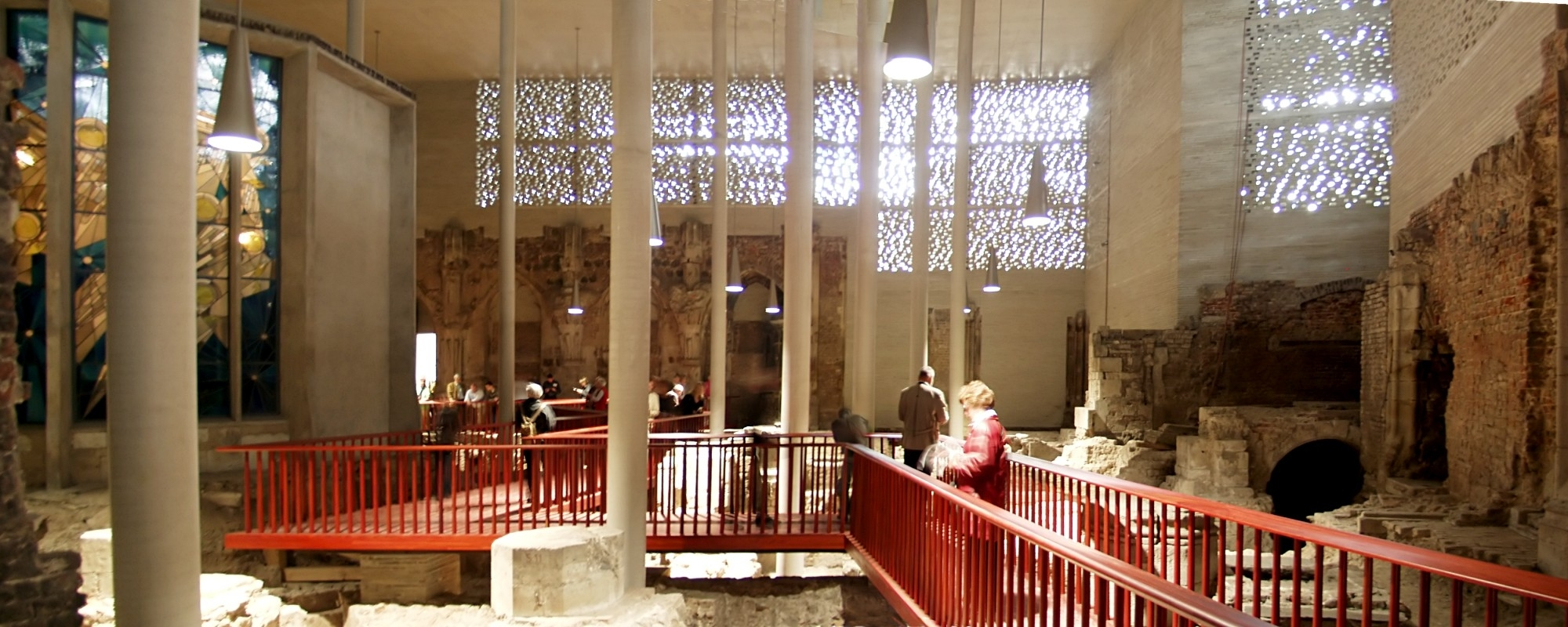
Foundations/excavations of the destroyed Romanesque church St. Kolumba, September 2007

Until 9 April 2007, the museum was located near the Cologne Cathedral at Roncalliplatz.

Atelier Zumthor won the architectural competition in 1997. Planning lasted until 2003, with the cornerstone laid on 1 October 2003 and the building consecrated on 15 September 2007 by Cardinal Meisner.

Architecturally, the new building reflects the concept of a "living museum". Zumthor implemented the juxtaposition of old and new by constructing on the original foundation and remains of St. Kolumba. The visible brickwork, specially fired for this project, harmonizes with the natural stone and brick masonry of the Romanesque church destroyed in World War II and the post-war concrete blocks. Thus, the museum architecture becomes part of the architectural continuum.

The interior is designed as a "museum of spiritual verticality". The exhibition spaces are illuminated by natural daylight; artificial lighting is avoided. Floor-to-ceiling glass panels create a seamless transition between inside and outside, reinforcing the idea of a "living museum" and an atmosphere of openness and limitlessness.

The new building incorporates both the foundations of the Romanesque church destroyed in World War II and the chapel "St. Kolumba (Cologne)|Madonna of the Ruins" built by Cologne architect Gottfried Böhm on the site. According to Ralf Gührer, the museum is based on a "unique concept" that is not intended as a model for other ecclesiastical museums. In the Kolumba concept, both the visitor and the artwork become subjects, as the museum provides the framework to "engage freely and leisurely with what Josef Pieper described as the human essence — the feast."

The museum comprises 16 exhibition rooms with differing dimensions, lighting conditions, and atmospheres. The spaces are characterized by natural lighting through floor-to-ceiling windows, subtle transitions, and a material palette of light grey plaster, Jura limestone floors, steel fixtures, and wood-leather furnishings. These elements contribute to what Zumthor called "spiritual verticality," inviting contemplation and slow engagement.

The ground floor houses the excavation site with a walkway across ancient foundations and includes the chapel as an integrated space. The upper floors present art in variably lit rooms. One highlight is the reading room with mahogany paneling and leather furnishings. A major conceptual element is the deliberate lack of signage and chronology, offering a "living museum" where artworks converse freely.

== Collection ==
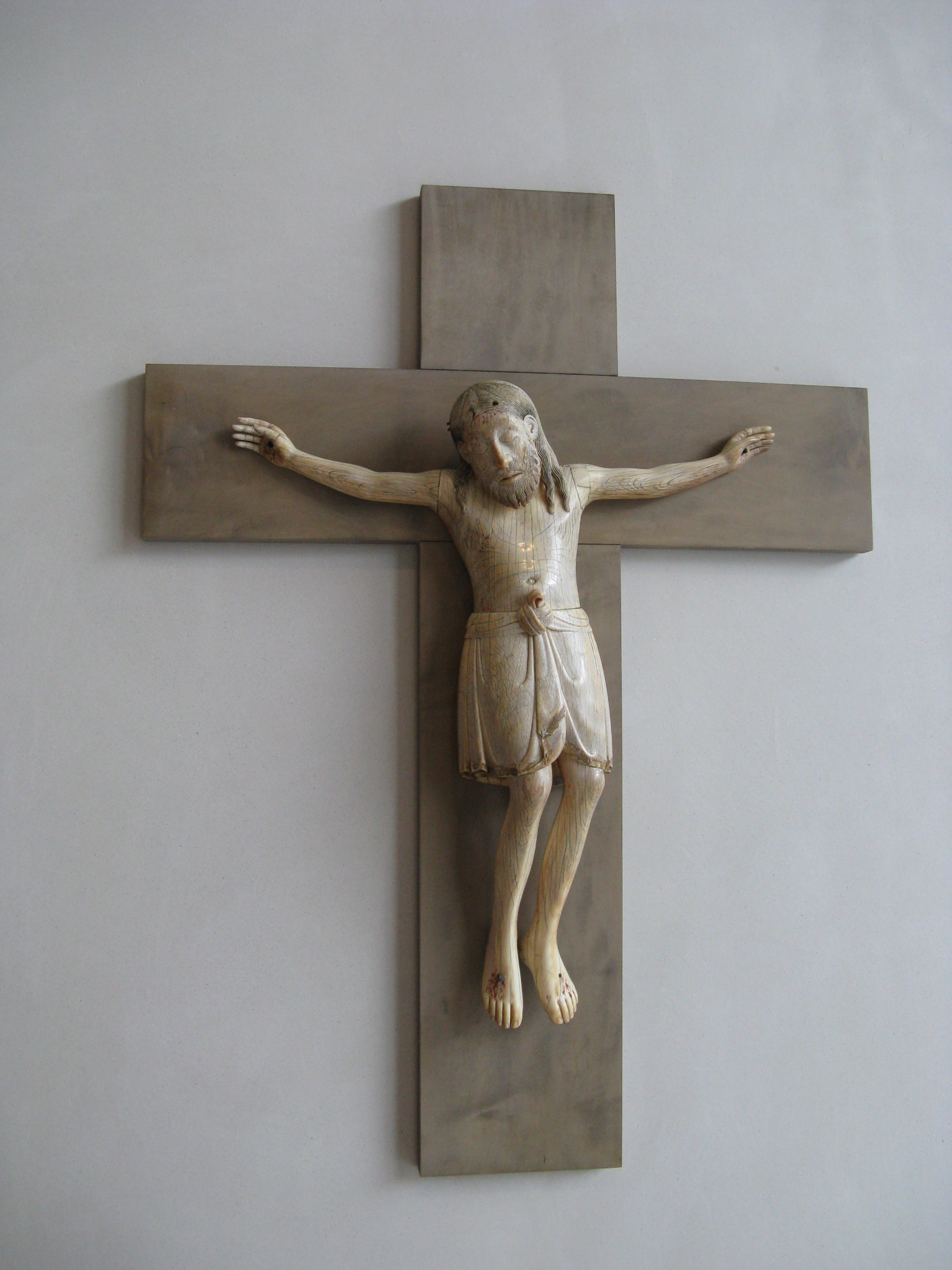
12th-century ivory crucifix.

Kolumba's collection spans late antiquity to contemporary art. Highlights include:

- The 12th-century ivory crucifix (Romanesque Rhenish-Mosan tradition)
- The "Hermann-Ida Cross" (11th century)
- Stefan Lochner's Madonna with the Violet
- Works by Paul Thek ("Shrine"), Jannis Kounellis, and Leiko Ikemura
- A comprehensive rosary collection
- Medieval liturgical objects, Gothic tabernacles, and Radical Painting
- Post-1945 contemporary art by Joseph Beuys, Louise Bourgeois, Rebecca Horn, Roni Horn, Agnes Martin and others

Exhibitions change annually on 14 September. The museum stages both old and new art in rotating constellations, often without labels, fostering personal discovery.

== Design Philosophy ==
Zumthor's concept, articulated in his book "Atmospheres," aimed to create spaces that elicit emotion and depth. The Kolumba museum illustrates his principles: interplay of light and material, carefully composed acoustics, and inviting spatial sequences. Each visitor shapes their own experience through a curated but free-flowing layout.

== Awards ==
- 2008: DAM Prize for Architecture in Germany
- 2008: Brick Award (Wienerberger)
- 2009: Museum Prize for Curators (Kulturstiftung hbs)
- 2010: Cologne Architecture Prize
- 2011: North Rhine-Westphalia Architecture Award
- 2013: Nike for Atmosphere and Grand Nike (Bund Deutscher Architekten)
- 2013: Named "Museum of the Year" by art – Das Kunstmagazin

== Collection ==
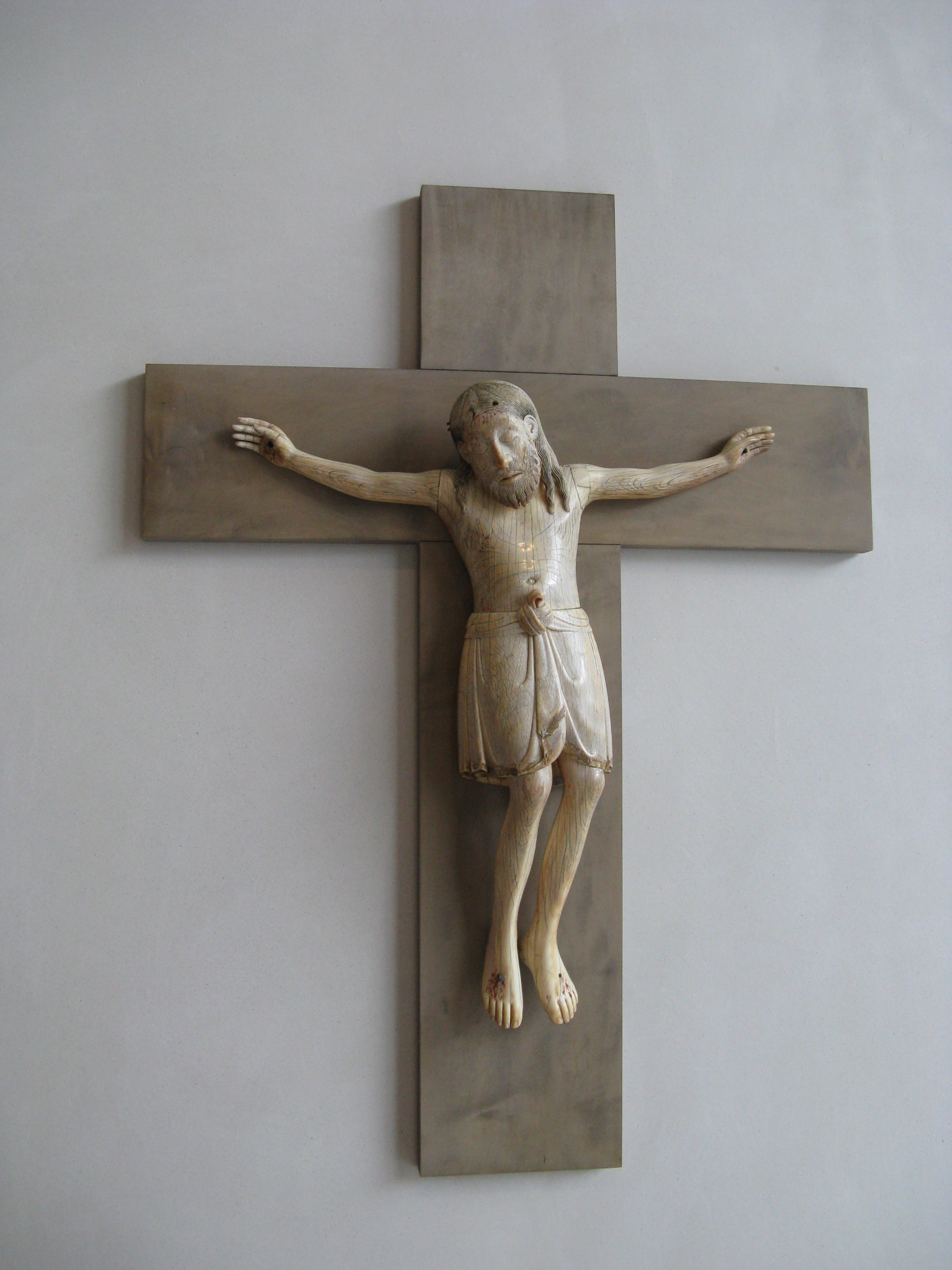
Ivory Crucifix (late 12th century)

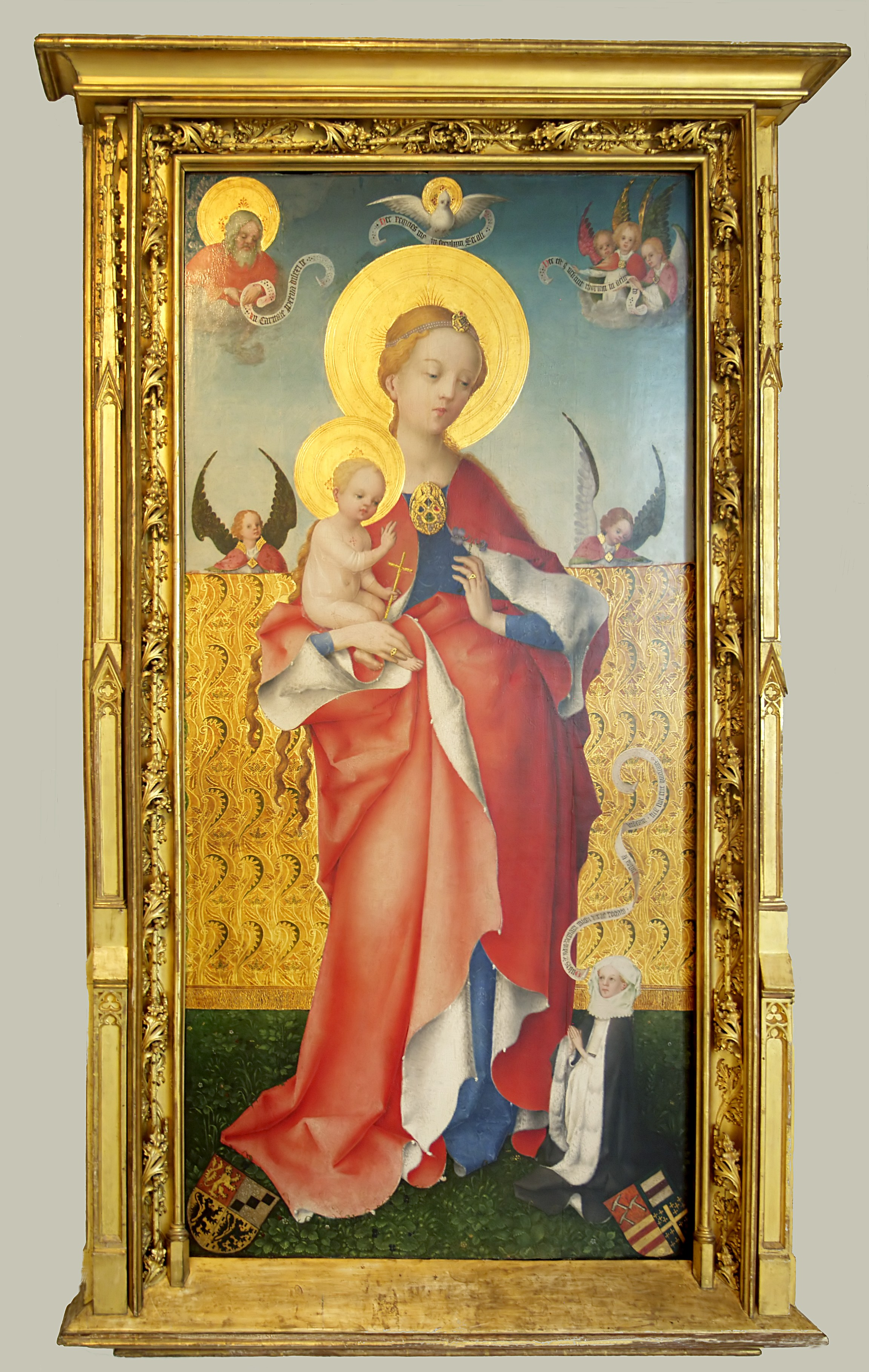
Lochner: Madonna of the Violets

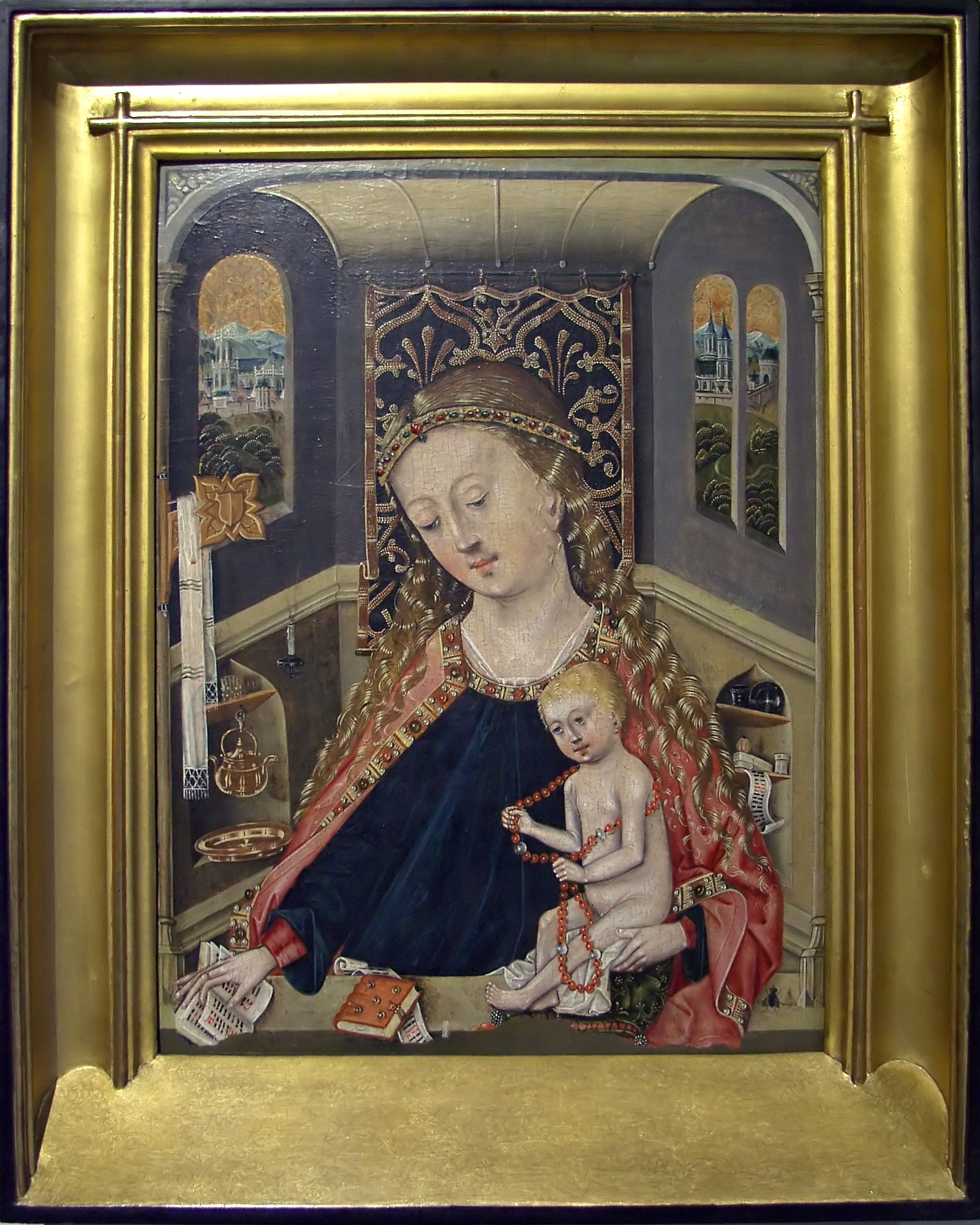
Madonna in the Oriel

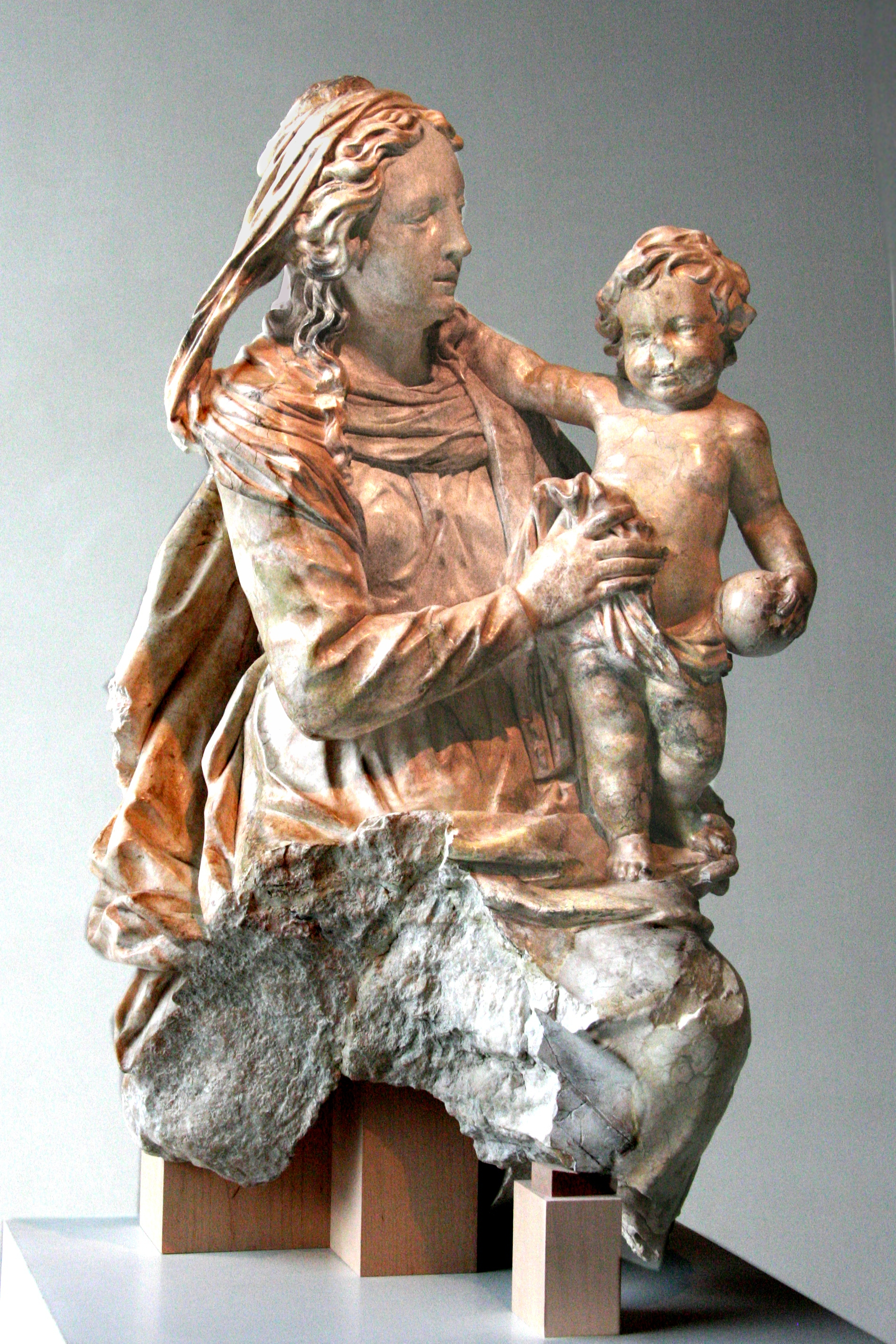
Geisselbrunn: Virgin and Child, Alabaster, 1650

The collection spans from Late Antiquity to the present, from Romanesque sculpture to spatial installations, from medieval panel painting to Radical Painting, from Gothic ciborium to 20th-century utilitarian objects. A unifying theme is the search for order, proportion, and beauty in all artistic creation. Key areas include early Christianity (notably Coptic and Syrian textiles), painting, sculpture, and goldsmithing from the 11th to 16th centuries (e.g. the Hermann Cross|Herimann Crucifix with a Roman lapis lazuli head, Romanesque Crucifix of Erp, and Stefan Lochner’s Madonna of the Violets), liturgical garments, parchment manuscripts, devotional objects, and one of the most complete collections of rosaries.

A major addition in 1996 was the Härle donation, containing two-thirds of one of the most significant private German collections of medieval sculpture. The 19th century is represented by paintings, drawings, and religious prints. The museum has developed a modern collection that bridges the 19th century and contemporary art, marked by the 1999 donation of part of Andor Weininger's estate, a key Bauhaus figure.

Contemporary works explore existential themes significant to the Church, represented by artists like Heinrich Campendonk, Hermann Stenner, Alexej von Jawlensky, Gerhard Marcks, Hildegard Domizlaff, and Georges Rouault. Avant-garde artists of the 1970s include Joseph Beuys, Manolo Millares, Antonio Saura, and Antoni Tàpies. The museum also holds the world's most extensive collection of works by Paul Thek.

Contemporary works on paper — sketches, drawings, and design studies — form a core area. Artists include Louise Bourgeois, Peter Dreher, Herbert Falken, Leiko Ikemura, Rebecca Horn, Roni Horn, Attila Kovács (artist)|Attila Kovács, Wolfgang Laib, Thomas Lehnerer, Joseph Marioni, Rune Mields, Agnes Martin, Thomas Rentmeister, Chris Newman, Richard Tuttle, and Darío Villalba.

A major acquisition in 1999, supported by cultural foundations and private patrons, was a Romanesque ivory crucifix from the collection of Eugen, Prince of Oettingen-Wallerstein|Eugen of Oettingen-Wallerstein, dated to the second half of the 12th century and attributed to the Rhenish-Mosan tradition. The 53 cm sculpture of the Corpus Christi is noted for its realism and the exceptionally precise facial features and hair for its period.

=== “Living Museum” ===
The living museum concept does not distinguish between permanent and temporary exhibitions. Instead, works from the collection are regularly recontextualized. In its intimate setting, object labels are largely absent, and artworks are displayed together without regard to chronology, style, or medium. Only a few key works remain permanently displayed.

This constant dialogue between old and contemporary art links the museum's memory with the visitor's present experience. This is extended through guided tours, events in music, theology, and philosophy, essays on individual works, library access, and the museum's publications.

The Stars for Kolumba series presents thematic and monographic exhibitions from various collection areas. Dialogue between works deepens interpretative possibilities. Solo exhibitions have included Andy Warhol – Crosses and Joseph Marioni – Triptych; thematic exhibitions explored “On Color”, “On Ambivalence”, and “On Reality.”

Since 1993, the ... in the Window series has shown individual contemporary positions. Kolumba has also participated in external exhibitions at institutions like the Kölnischer Kunstverein, Kunsthalle Baden-Baden, and St. Peter in Cologne, and has been represented internationally from Bilbao to Brisbane, New York to Berlin. Major manuscript exhibitions include the trilogy: Vaticana (1992), The Cologne Cathedral Library (1998), and ars vivendi – ars moriendi (2001).

The collection reinstallation changes each year on 14 September, the Feast of the Exaltation of the Holy Cross, after a two-week closure.

Room 10 features quarterly-changing contemporary exhibitions, each accompanied by a booklet.

== See also ==
- List of museums in Cologne
- Peter Zumthor
