= Carl Aldenhoven =

German art historian (1842–1907)

Carl Aldenhoven (25 November 1842 – 24 September 1907) was a German art historian who served as director of the Ducal Library at the Friedenstein Palace in Gotha (1873–1879), the Ducal Museum in the same city (1879–1890) and the Wallraf-Richartz-Museum in Cologne (1890–1907).

== Life ==
He was born in Rendsburg, where his father taught classical languages at the gymnasium. He studied classical philology, classical archaeology and art history at the universities of Jena, Bonn and Kiel. In 1862, whilst studying at Jena, he joined the Burschenschaft Arminia auf dem Burgkeller. After his studies he too became a gymnasium teacher in 1869, in his case in Husum from 1869 and at the Gymnasium Ernestinum in Gotha from 1871, but had to retire from teaching for health reasons and instead became director of the ducal library then museum in the same city. The museum was the newly founded public museum housing Ernest II's art collections (excluding his library and its associated coin collection), for which Aldenhoven created a new catalogue. That catalogue was then kept up-to-date until 1945 and proved an invaluable source for documenting post-war losses, mainly Soviet looting.

In 1890 he moved to Cologne to take up a director's post there, where he focussed on research into that city's school of painting. He taught at the Kölnischer Kunstverein from 1890 to his death and on 8 October 1897 was appointed Professor.

He was appointed to the Hofrat soon afterwards and from 1902 to 1907 gave regular public lectures on art historical themes such as art north of the Alps, Italian Renaissance art, introductions to art history and aesthetics, 17th-century painting, ancient sculpture, German art and Dutch painting. Later, Aldenhoven had a plaster bust made by Johann Baptist Schreiner (1866–1935), which he bequeathed to the museum after his death in Cologne. After his death, another bust was commissioned from Schreiner. Aldenhoven's successor as director of the Wallraf-Richartz-Museum was Alfred Hagelstange.

== Selected works ==
- Ludwig Scheibler und Carl Aldenhoven: Geschichte der Kölner Malerschule, (= Publikationen der Gesellschaft für Rheinische Geschichtskunde, Bd. 13), Köln, Bonn, Düsseldorf, 1902. Das Werk wurde 1923 von Karl Schaefer wiederherausgegeben.
- Verzeichnis der Gemälde des städtischen Museums Wallraf-Richartz zu Cöln [1905], Kölner Verlagsanstalt, Köln, 1905
- Gesammelte Aufsätze. Klinkhardt & Biermann, Leipzig 1911.

== Bibliography ==
- (in German) Karl Bader: Lexikon deutscher Bibliothekare im Haupt und Nebenamt bei Fürsten, Staaten und Städten. Harrassowitz, Leipzig 1925 (Zentralblatt für Bibliothekswesen, Beiheft; 55), S. 3.
- (in German) Elga Böhm: Carl Aldenhoven (1842–1907) – Der erste wissenschaftliche Direktor des Wallraf-Richartz-Museums Köln. In: Wallraf-Richartz-Jahrbuch 44, 1983, S. 307–347.
- (in German) Helge Dvorak: Biographisches Lexikon der Deutschen Burschenschaft. Band II: Künstler. Winter, Heidelberg 2018, ISBN 978-3-8253-6813-5, S. 6–7.
- (in German) Brigitte Lymant: Carl Aldenhoven als Kunsthistoriker. In: Wallraf-Richartz-Jahrbuch 44, 1983, S. 349–359.
- (in German) Helmut Roob, Günter Scheffler: Aldenhoven, Carl. In: Dies.: Gothaer Persönlichkeiten. Taschenlexikon. 2. Aufl., RhinoVerlag, Ilmenau 2006, ISBN 3-932081-37-4, S. 11.
