= Master of the Wasservass Calvary =

German painter

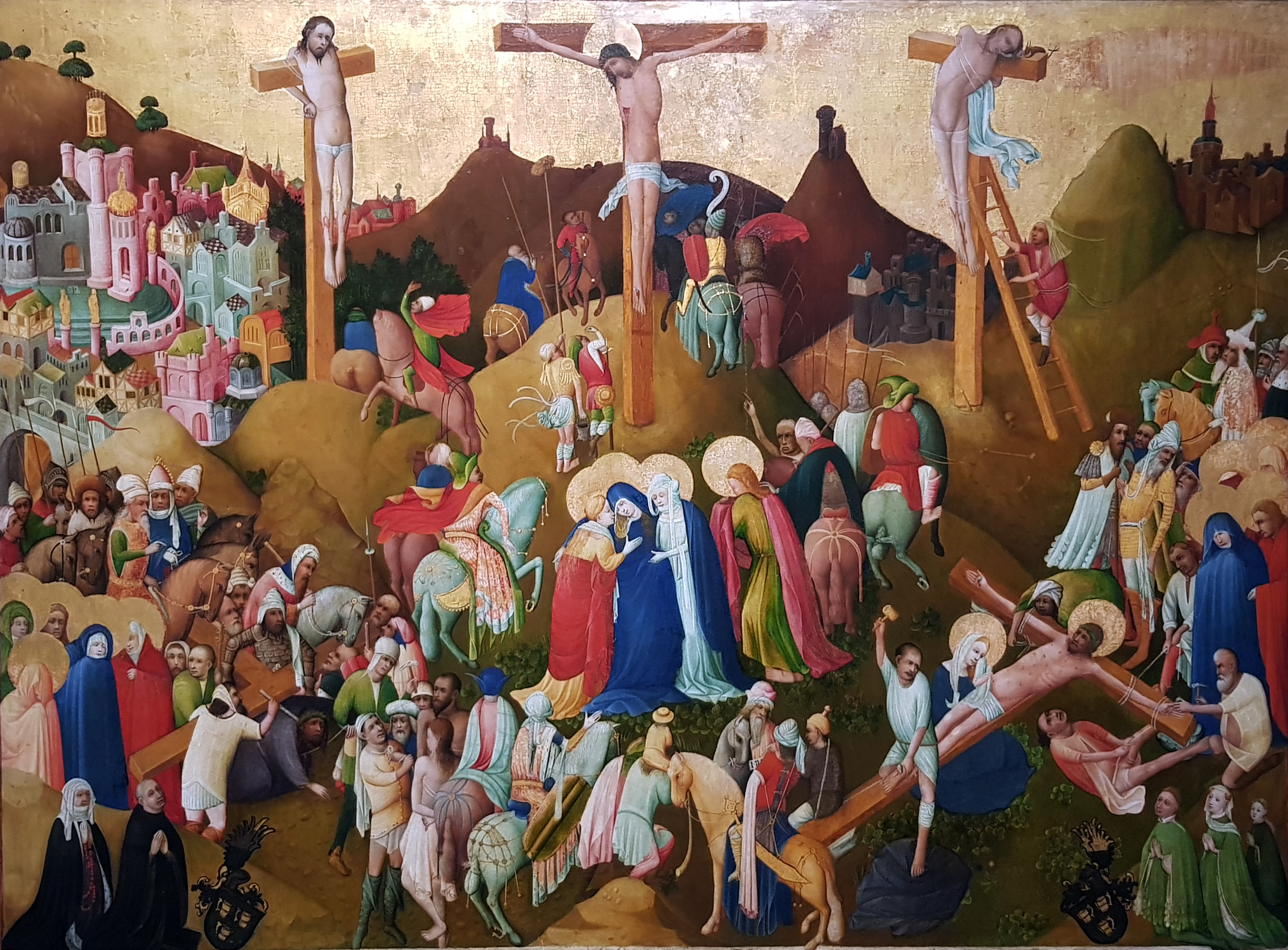
The Wasservass Calvary (Wallraf-Richartz-Museum, Cologne)

The Master of the Wasservass Calvary (German - Meister des Wasservass’schen Kalvarienbergs) is the notname for a painter active in Cologne between 1415 and 1435. He is relatively unusual in Cologne art of his time, owing more to Burgundian manuscript illuminating and Early Netherlandish painting of the time.

He is named after a 1420-1430 painting of the Crucifixion with the coat of arms of the Wasservass family, itself named after the Wasservass house in Cologne. Probably commissioned by Gerhard von Esch, the painting is now in Cologne's Wallraf-Richartz-Museum but was originally in the St Kolumba Church in that city. No other surviving works can be definitively attributed to him
