= St. Kolumba, Cologne =

Former church in Cologne, Germany

St. Kolumba
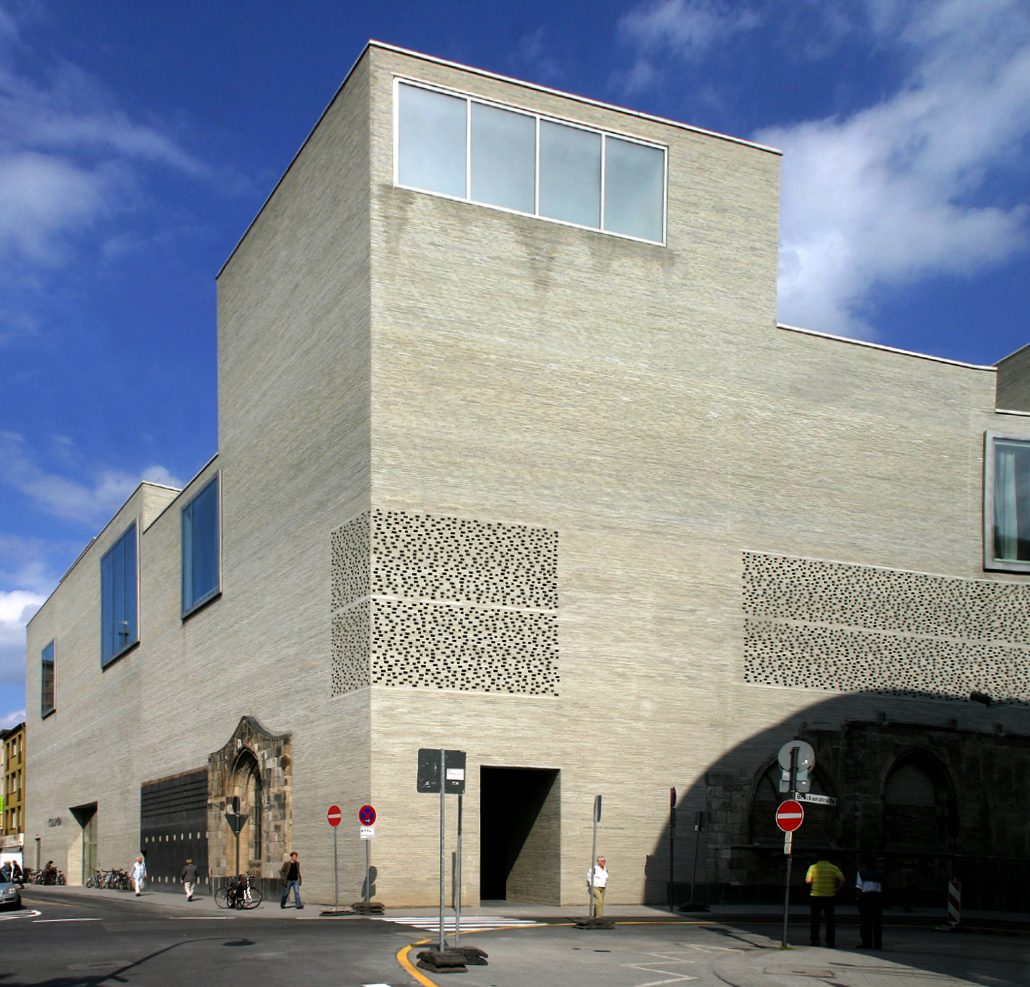
- Exterior of the Kolumba museum, with the entry to the St. Kolumba chapel

Religion
- Affiliation: Catholic
- Province: Diocese of Cologne
- Ecclesiastical or organizational status: ruins as memorial

Location
- Location: Cologne, North Rhine-Westphalia, Germany
- Interactive map of St. Kolumba
- Coordinates: 50°56′18″N 6°57′15″E

Architecture
- Style: Gothic
- Destroyed: 1943

St. Kolumba was one of the largest parish churches in medieval Cologne, dating back to 980, and dedicated to Columba of Sens. The original Romanesque church was replaced by a Gothic church. Artworks in it included the Saint Columba Altarpiece by Rogier van der Weyden, and an altar by an anonymous artist.

It was almost completely destroyed by bombing in World War II. From 1947, a chapel was built on the ruins, dedicated to Mary as "Madonna of the Ruins". The chapel was called St. Kolumba from 2007, when it became part of the Kolumba, the museum of the archdiocese of Cologne.

== History ==
A church of this name was mentioned first in 980. It was a small church in Romanesque style with one nave. It was first a dependent church of the Dom, consecrated in 873, but became an independent parish. In the 12th century, the church was expanded to three naves. It was replaced by a hall church in Gothic style with five naves, keeping only the central nave and the tower. In the 17th century, the interior was decorated in Baroque style. The church was restored in the 19th century. The church featured notable artworks, such as the Saint Columba Altarpiece by Rogier van der Weyden, a Bartholomäus-Altar by the Master of the Saint Bartholomew Altarpiece, and the Master of the Wasservass Calvary. The church was close to the first University of Cologne. Forty mayors of Cologne were buried next to the church.

=== Madonna in den Trümmern ===
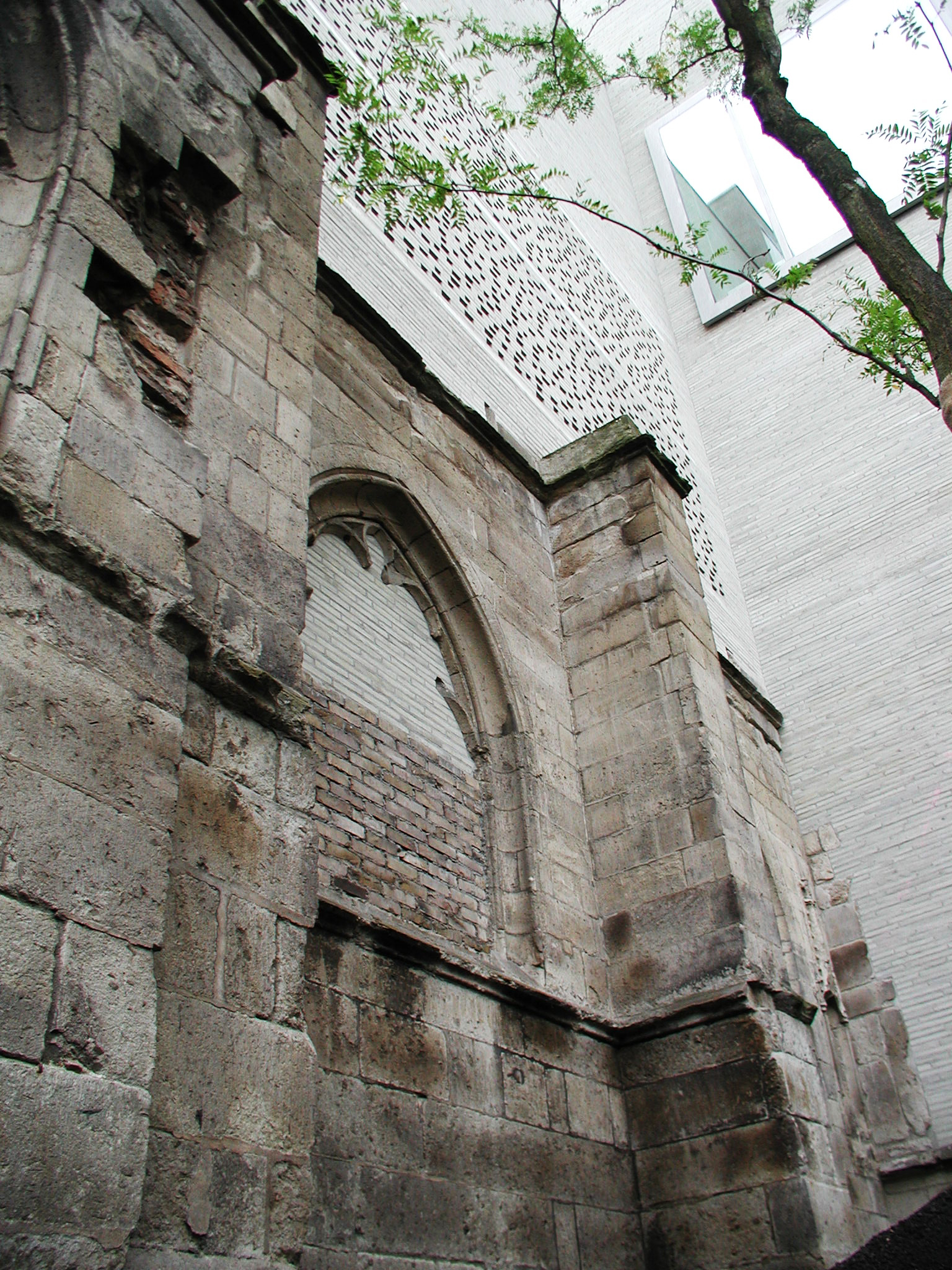
St. Kolumba, remaining walls in the Kolumbahof

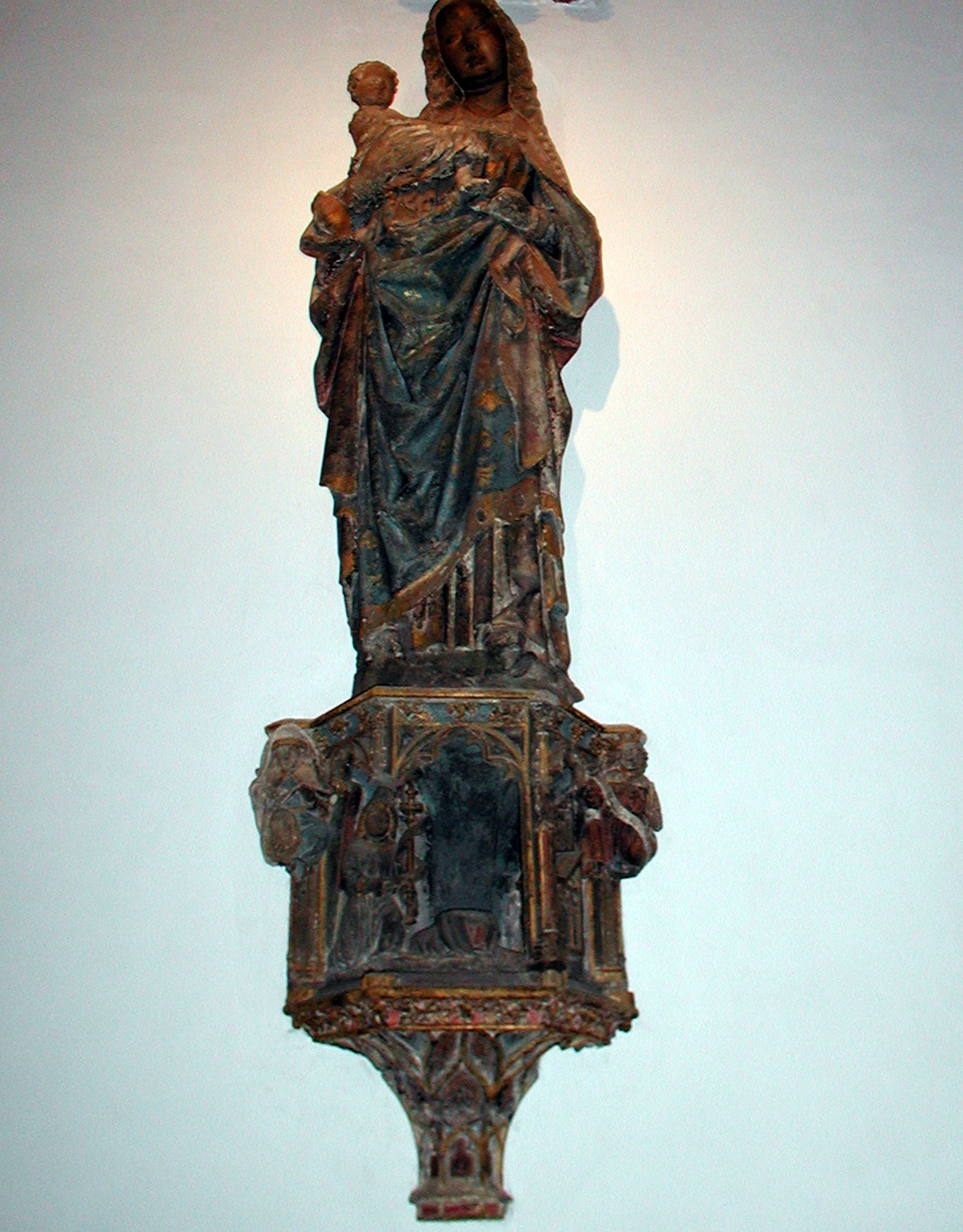
Statue of Mary from 1460/70

The church was destroyed by bombing in 1943. Only some exterior walls, the basement of the tower, the entrance hall, and a Gothic statue of Mary survived. The life-size statue dates to 1460–70. In 1947, the architect Gottfried Böhm was commissioned to build a chapel around these remnants. He designed an octagonal tent-like structure. After building from 1949, it was consecrated on 7 December 1950. It features stained-glass windows by Ludwig Gies, added in 1954 and depicting angels. Böhm created a marble altar, and added a sacrament chapel in 1957. The chapel was seen as a memorial of the war, called Madonna in den Trümmern ("Madonna of the Ruins"). Ruins of former churches, from medieval to Gothic, were excavated on the site in the 1970s.

The Swiss architect Peter Zumthor designed a new museum for the archdiocese which integrates the chapel, and the excavation sites. Building began in 2003, and the Kolumba was opened in 2007.
