= Melchior Boisserée =

German art collector

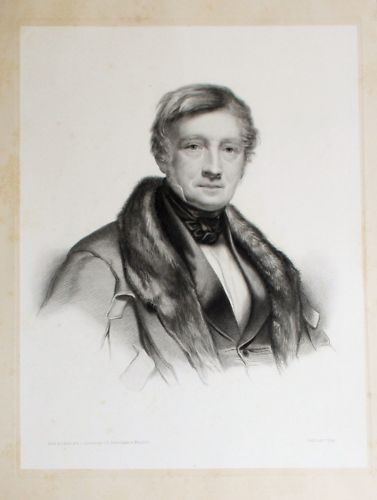
Melchior Boisserée (1840)

Melchior Boisserée (1786 – 1851) was a German art collector and artist.

== Life ==
Boiserée was born at Cologne in 1786. In the wake of the French occupation and the closure of many churches, he undertook, in conjunction with his brother, Sulpice Boisserée, and Johann Baptist Bertram, the formation of a collection of pictures by early German and Netherlandish painters, to which the three devoted twenty years' labour and the bulk of their fortunes. The most important work in their collection, bought in 1808, was the Adoration of the Magi part of the St Columba Altarpiece, which the brothers believed to be by Jan van Eyck although it is now attributed to Rogier van der Weyden.

In 1819 they moved their collection from Heidelberg to Stuttgart, and in 1827 sold the pictures, with a few exceptions which are in the chapel of St. Maurice at Nuremberg, to the King of Bavaria, for 120,000 thalers (£18,000); they are now in the Pinakothek at Munich. The collection was recorded in a series of 117 lithographs by the Danish printmaker Johann Nepomuk Strixner, published between 1821 and 1840 in 39 parts.

Boisserée was the inventor of a new and simple method of painting on glass by means of the brush alone, and employed it for the reproduction of the best works in his collection, and of some chefs-d'oeuvre of the Italian school which are now at Bonn.

He died at Bonn in 1851.

== See also ==
- List of German painters
