= Cologne school of painting =

German art movement of c. 1300 – c. 1550

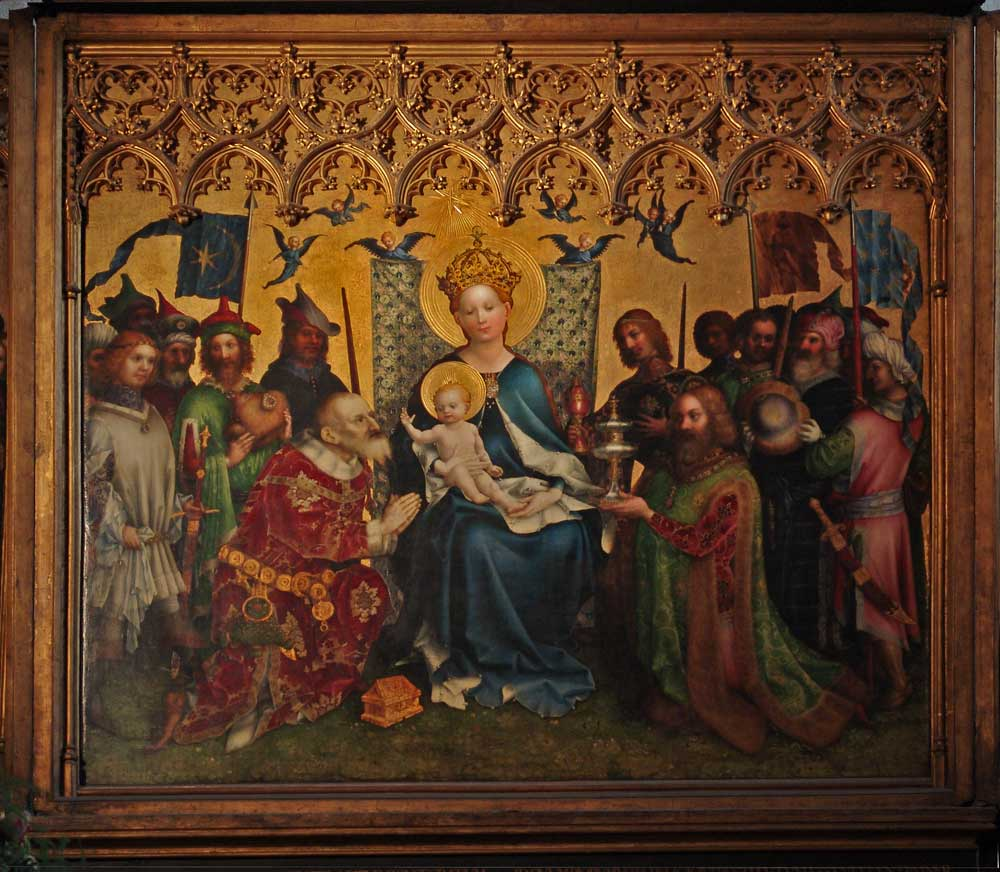
Stephan Lochner: Altar of the Cologne City Patrons (middle panel), c. 1450

The Cologne school of painting is the set of medieval German painters generally. This term, first applied in the 19th century, subsequently came to refer specifically to painters who had their workshops in medieval Cologne and the lower-Rhine region from about 1300 to 1550.

== Style periods ==
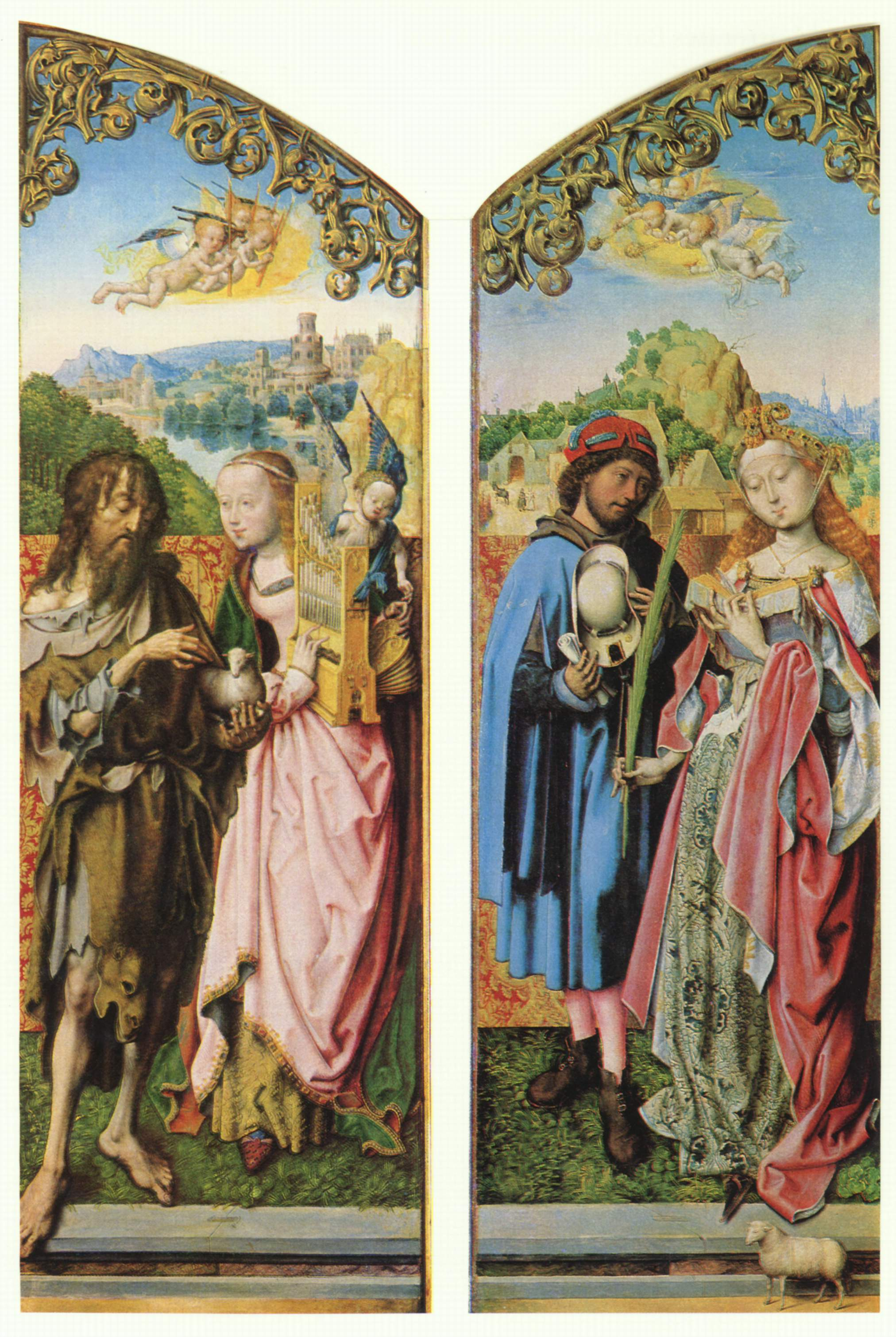
Inner left and right panels of the Saint Bartholomew Altarpiece (c.1510)

Initially, smaller altarpieces such as the Klaren Altar in Cologne Cathedral (c. 1360–1370) were created, based on book paintings from around the year 1300. The mid-15th century is the high-point of this school, when Stefan Lochner (active 1442–1451) created the Altar of the City Patrons, which is considered to be the greatest masterpiece of the Cologne school. A third creative period followed, under the influence of Netherlandish painters such as Rogier van der Weyden. Rogier's influence is especially notable in the work of the outstanding representative of this final phase, the anonymous painter known as the Master of the Saint Bartholomew Altarpiece. For example, the latter's large Deposition of Christ resembles the same theme represented in the former's Escorial altarpiece, and the Master's heightened naturalism and emphasis on tear-stained features reflect Rogier's emotionalism.

== Painters of the Cologne school ==
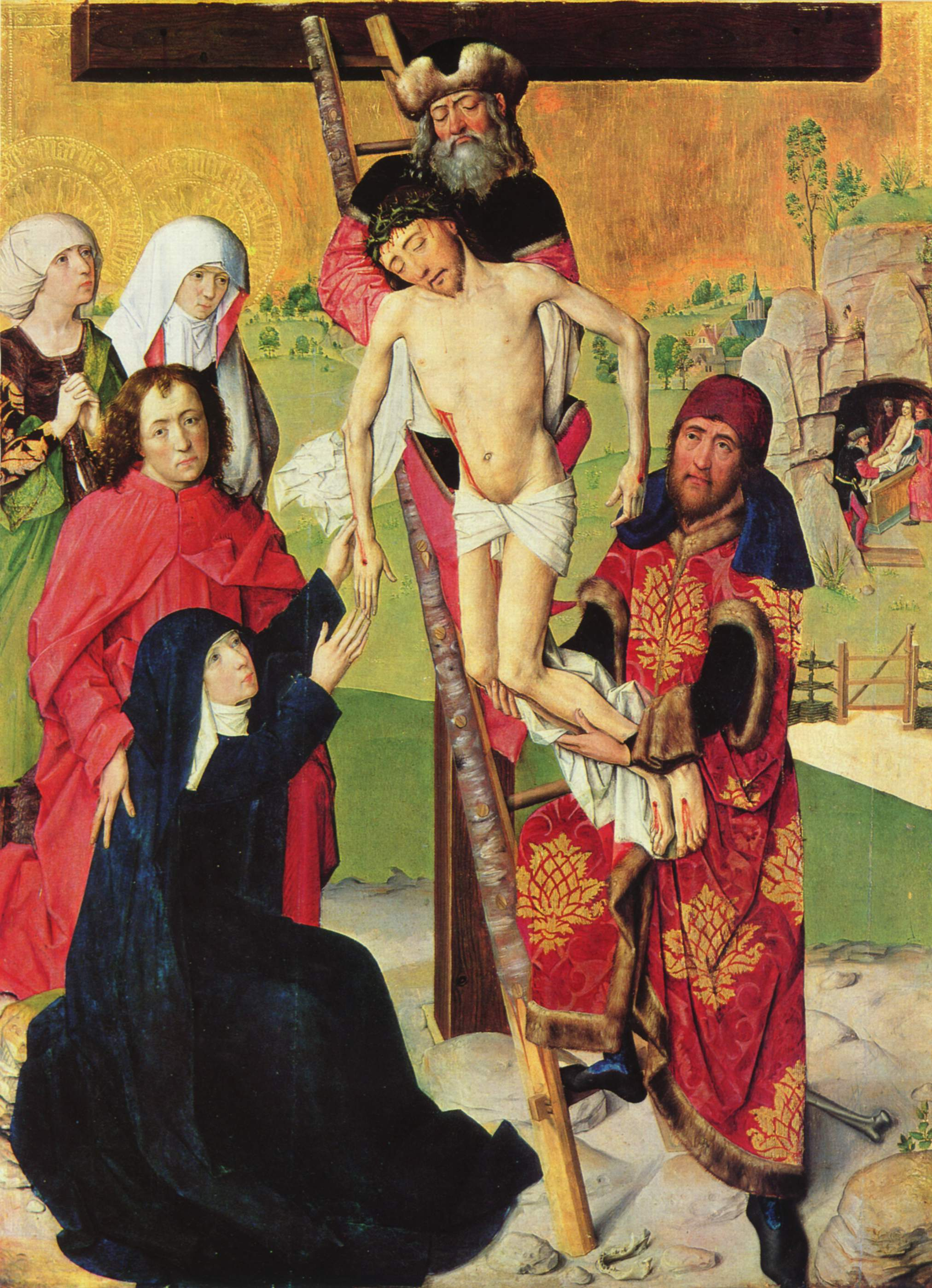
The Deposition of Christ by the Master of the Life of the Virgin

The artists of the Cologne school include Stefan Lochner and William of Cologne, as well as a number of artists identified only by the works they created:

- Master of the Aachen Altar
- Master of the Saint Bartholomew Altarpiece
- Master of the Heisterbach Altarpiece
- Master of the Legend of Saint Ursula
- Master of Saint Severin
- Master of Saint Lawrence
- Master of the Legend of Saint George
- Master of the Life of the Virgin
- Elder Master of the Holy Kinship
- Master of Saint Veronica
- Master of the Glorification of the Virgin
- Master of the Lesser Passion
- Master of the Lyversberg Passion
- Master of the Wasservass Calvary
- Master of the Twelve Apostles
- Master of the Palanter Altar
- Master of the Sinzig Calvary

== The Cologne artists' quarter ==
The Cologne painters worked mainly in the area of Old Cologne around the Schildergasse, the artists' quarter, where sign painters were also active.
