= Sulpiz Boisserée =

German art and architecture historian (1783–1854)

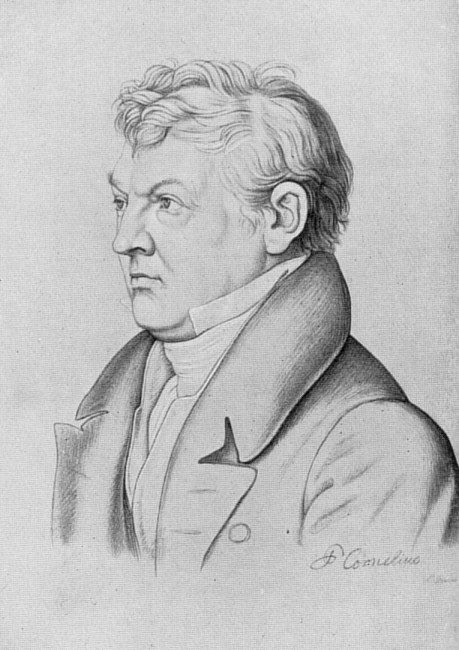
Drawing of Boisserée by Peter von Cornelius.

Sulpiz Boiserée (2 August 1783 - 2 May 1854) was a German art collector and art historian. With his brother Melchior he formed a collection that ultimately formed the basis of that of the Alte Pinakothek. He played a key role in the completion of Cologne Cathedral.

== Life ==
Boisserée was born in Cologne on 2 August 1783, into a wealthy family having their origins in what is now Huy, Belgium from where they migrated to Cologne in the 18th century. After his mother and father died in 1790 and 1792, Boisserée was raised by his grandmother during the Napoleonic occupation of Cologne. He was expected to continue the family business while his younger brother, Melchior, was expected to become a scientist. In 1799, at the age of 16, Boisserée attended school in Hamburg, where he discovered his interest in art. After he returned to Cologne, Boisserée, his friend Johann Baptist Bertram and his brother Melchior began to systematically collect and save medieval paintings from the secularization processes at that time, initially with a focus on paintings of German and Dutch origins. In 1803, the brothers went to Paris, where they studied the works on show at the Musée Napoleon at the Louvre, which had been greatly enriched through Napoleon’s looting of art from abroad. In Paris they became disciples of the romantic theorist Friedrich Schlegel with whom they visited Belgium and Switzerland in 1804-5.

== Collecting ==
In 1804, alarmed by the nationalisation of church property and its destruction through sales, the Boisserée brothers began to collect medieval art, motivated as much by the desire to save it as to possess it. Melchior concentrated on acquisition and Sulpiz on research.

Boisserée developed a new theory of the history of German painting, rejecting the idea that it had evolved gradually from crude beginnings; he proposed instead that a refined medieval style, ultimately derived from Byzantine prototypes had flourished, until the art was revolutionised by Jan van Eyck.

In 1810 the brothers put their collection on public display in a palace in Heidelberg, attracting enthusiastic attention from Romantic circles. Schlegel was especially enthusiastic. Goethe, who also visited the collection was, with his classical sympathies, more reserved, although he was still prepared to write a preface for Boisserée's essay Altdeutsche Baukunst (1817). The brothers closed their museum in 1819. Boisserée wrote a catalogue of the collection, commissioning Johann Nepomuk Strixner to document the works in a series of lithographs, which were published between 1821 and 1840. In 1827 Georg von Dillis, the director of the royal collection of Ludwig I of Bavaria, bought the complete collection. Bertram and the Boisserée brothers followed it to Munich, and in 1835 Boisserée was appointed general curator of sculptural monuments in Bavaria, and the museum was finally opened as the Alte Pinakothek.

The Boisserée collection, still in the Alte Pinakothek, includes the "Columba altarpiece" (1455) by Rogier van der Weyden (which Boisserée believed to be by van Eyck), Cardinal Charles of Bourbon, Archbishop of Lyon by the Master of Moulins, the Seven Joys of the Virgin (1480) by Hans Memling, and the "Pearl of Brabant" (1465) by Dieric Bouts the elder.

== Cologne Cathedral ==
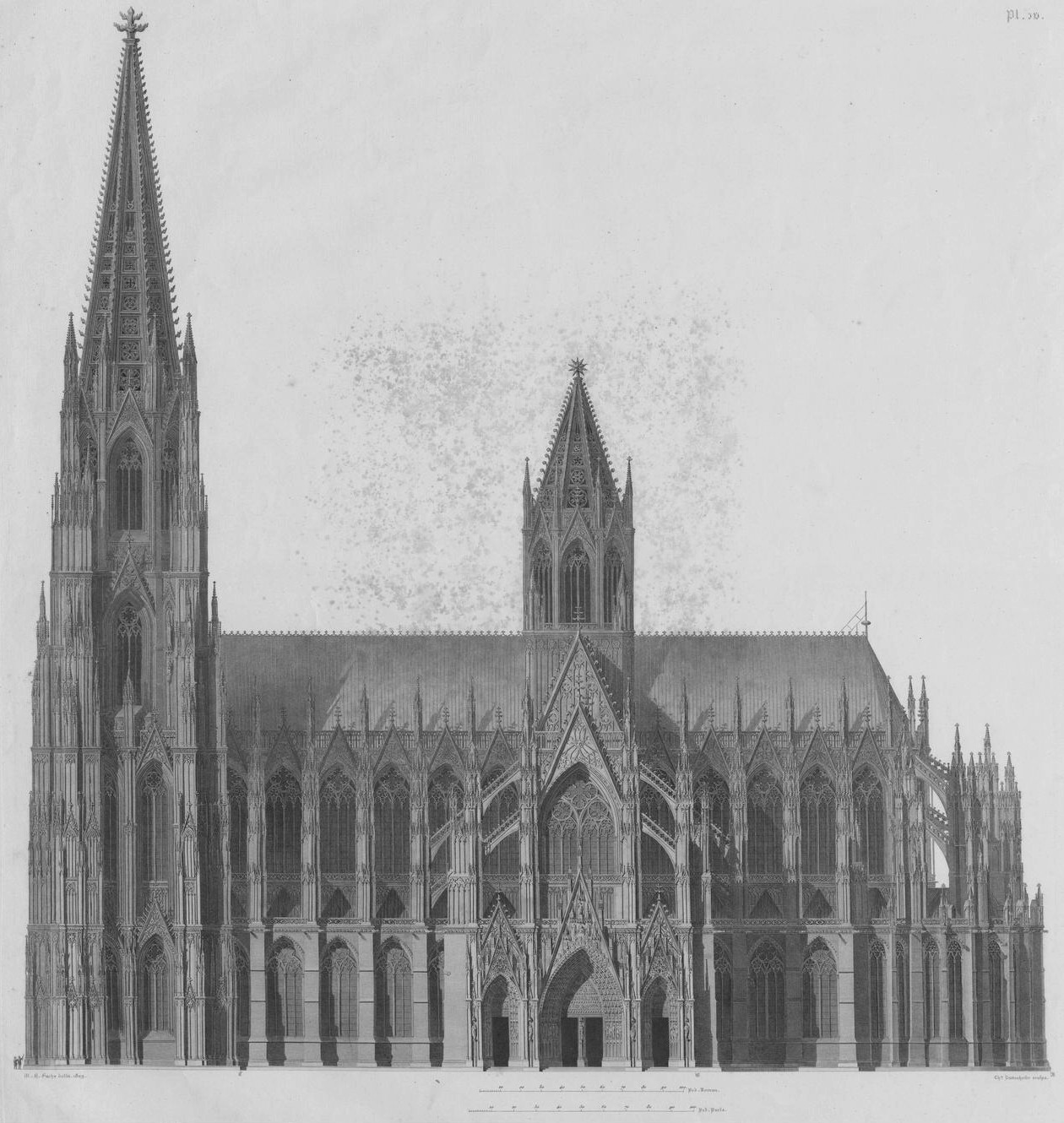
Engraving of Cologne Cathedral by Christian Friedrich Traugott Duttenhofer for Boisserée's Ansichten, Risse und einzelne Teile des Domes von Köln (1823–31)

Boisserée spent much of his time campaigning for the restoration and completion of Cologne Cathedral, where construction had come to a halt during the Reformation. Soon after settling in Heidelberg in 1810 he commissioned a survey of the building, and a set of drawings which were eventually published as engravings. Following the end of the Napoleonic wars, he managed to acquire, separately, the two halves of an enormous late 13th-century drawing, showing the original design for the west end, including the unbuilt north-west tower and west gable, and whole of the south-west tower, which had been only partially constructed . He was able to interest Crown Prince Frederick William of Prussia (later King Frederick William IV) in the project, and in 1817 the prince commissioned a report from the architect Karl Friedrich Schinkel. Work on the cathedral was eventually resumed in 1842, and the building was completed towards the end of the 19th century.

== Last years ==
The brothers eventually returned to the Rhineland from Munich, settling in Bonn in 1845. Boisserée died there on 2 May 1854, Melchior having predeceased him three years earlier.
