= Paul Thek =

American artist (1933–1988)

- Born: November 2, 1933; Brooklyn, New York City, U.S.
- Died: August 10, 1988 (aged 54); Manhattan, New York City, U.S.
- Education: Art Students League of New York, Pratt Institute, Cooper Union School of the Arts
- Known for: Painting, sculpture, installation art

Paul Thek (November 2, 1933 – August 10, 1988) was an American painter, sculptor and installation artist. Thek was active in both the United States and Europe, exhibiting several installations and sculptural works over the course of his life. Posthumously, he has been widely exhibited throughout the United States and Europe, and his work is held in numerous collections including the Hirshhorn Museum and Sculpture Garden in Washington, DC, the Centre Georges Pompidou, Paris, and Kolumba Museum - the art museum of the archdiocese of Cologne.

== Life and career ==
Thek (born George Thek) was the second of four children born to parents of German and Irish ancestry in Brooklyn. In 1950, Thek studied at the Art Students League of New York as well as Pratt Institute in Brooklyn, before entering the School of Art at the Cooper Union in New York in 1951. Upon graduating in 1954, he moved to Miami, where he met and became involved with set designer Peter Harvey, who introduced Thek to a number of artists and writers such as Tennessee Williams. During this time, Thek created some of his first known drawings, including studies in charcoal and graphite (now held in Kolumba's collections), later followed by abstract watercolors and oil paintings. Thek first referred to himself as Paul Thek starting in 1955; in a letter to Harvey, he writes: "Let me tell you who I am George Joseph Thek but Paul to you and Paul to me you would have to be me to know why I am Paul after all this erroneous George business." In 1957, he exhibited his works for the first time at Mirrell Gallery in Miami. It was in Florida that Thek first met photographer Peter Hujar, who photographed Thek in Coral Gables.

By the end of 1959, Thek and Hujar, now a couple, were living in New York. Thek traveled to Italy in 1962, and with Hujar visited the Catacombs of the Capuchins in Palermo, an experience which had a strong influence on his work.

During the 1960s, Thek and Hujar associated with a number of artists and writers including Joseph Raffael, Eva Hesse, Gene Swenson, and Susan Sontag. Thek was particularly close to Sontag, who dedicated her 1966 collection of essays, Against Interpretation, to him. According to Sontag's biographer, the title and inspiration for the eponymous essay came from Thek. One day when Sontag was "talking about art in a cerebral way that many complained was a bore," he interrupted: "Susan, stop, stop. I'm against interpretation. We don't look at art when we interpret it. That's not the way to look at art."

In 1964, he participated in Andy Warhol's Screen Tests. It was during this time that he began to work in installation and sculpture, most notably creating wax sculptures made in the likeness of meat. Between 1964 and 1967, Thek had three solo exhibitions of his famed Technological Reliquaries at Stable Gallery and Pace Gallery in New York.

Thek was awarded a Fulbright fellowship in 1967 to Italy, leaving New York shortly after his exhibition for The Tomb opened. The figure in Thek's Tomb was popularly associated with the American hippie movement and has often been mistitled as Death of a Hippie. He traveled and lived throughout Europe during the late 1960s and early 1970s and worked on large scale installations.

After a peripatetic lifestyle, Thek took up permanent residence in New York in 1976 and began teaching at Cooper Union. Amid increasing emotional stress, he struggled to make and sell work, but began to show nationally and internationally again during the 1980s. He died on August 10, 1988, a year after learning he had AIDS. After his death, Sontag dedicated AIDS and Its Metaphors to his memory.

In 2010, the Whitney Museum of American Art exhibited the first American retrospective of Thek's work with Diver, a Retrospective. Works of Paul Thek are on permanent display at The Watermill Center on Long Island, New York.

== Notable works ==
Warrior's Leg, (1966–1967). Wax, metal, leather, and paint; in the Hirshhorn Museum and Sculpture Garden

Technological Reliquaries, or Meat Pieces (1964–1967), is among Thek's most notable body of works, wax sculptures made in the likeness of raw meat and human limbs encased in Plexiglas vitrines. In a 1966 interview, he speaks of the work: “I hope the work has the innocence of those Baroque Crypts in Sicily; their initial effect is so stunning you fall back for a moment and then it's exhilarating…It delighted me that bodies could be used to decorate a room, like flowers. We accept our thing-ness intellectually but the emotional acceptance of it can be a joy.”

The Tomb (1967), perhaps his most famous work, was a pink ziggurat which encased an effigy of Thek made from a mannequin with face, hands, and feet cast from his own body. Painted in a light pink, the effigy featured a protruding tongue and a hand bloodied from amputation, and was surrounded by other casts of Thek's body in cases roped off with red cords in reference to archeological digs.

The Procession/The Artist's Co-op (1969, Stedelijk Museum, Amsterdam), Pyramid/A Work in Progress (1971–72, Moderna Museet, Stockholm), Ark, Pyramid (1972, documenta 5, Kassel), and Ark, Pyramid, Easter (1973, Kunstmuseum Luzern) were a series of conceptually-related installations created with a number of collaborators during Thek's time in Europe. Each contained common elements which served to create an immersive environment, including: the “Hippie” (a cast of Thek's body), the Dwarf Parade Table (a table supported by a latex statue of a dwarf and chairs), and a chicken coop. With each installation came an increasing number of items compromising the pieces, to the point at which much of Ark, Pyramid, Easter had to be destroyed as Kunstmuseum Luzern could no longer store the components.

== Exhibitions ==
- 1969: The Procession/The Artist's Co-op, Stedelijk Museum, Amsterdam
- 1971: Pyramid/A Work in Progress, Moderna Museet, Stockholm
- 1973: Ark, Pyramid-Easter, Kunstmuseum Luzern
- 1977: Paul Thek/Processions, Institute of Contemporary Art, Philadelphia
- 1995: Paul Thek: The wonderful world that almost was, Witte de With Center for Contemporary Art, Rotterdam; Neue Nationalgalerie, Berlin; Fundacio Antoni Tapies, Barcelona; Kunsthalle Zürich/Museum für Gegenwartskunst, Zürich; MAC, galeries contemporaines des musées de Marseille, Marseille
- 2005: Paul Thek Luzern 1973/2005, Kunstmuseum Luzern
- 2009: Paul Thek: Artist's Artist, Museo Nacional Centro de Arte Reina Sofia, Madrid
- 2010–11: Paul Thek: Diver, A Retrospective, Whitney Museum of American Art, New York; Carnegie Museum of Art, Pittsburgh; Hammer Museum, Los Angeles
- 2012–13: Art is Liturgy – Paul Thek and the Others, Kolumba, Art Museum of The Archdiocese of Cologne
- 2012–13: Paul Thek, in Process, Moderna Museet, Stockholm; Lehmbruck Museum, Duisburg; Kunstmuseum Luzern
- 2015: Please Write! Paul Thek and Franz Deckwitz: An Artists' Friendship, Museum Boijmans Van Beuningen, Rotterdam
- 2021: Paul Thek: Interior/Landscape, The Watermill Center, Water Mill, New York
- 2022: Paul Thek: Italian Hours, Fondazione Nicola del Roscio, Rome, Italy
