= Master of the Saint Bartholomew Altarpiece =

Early Netherlandish painter active in Germany

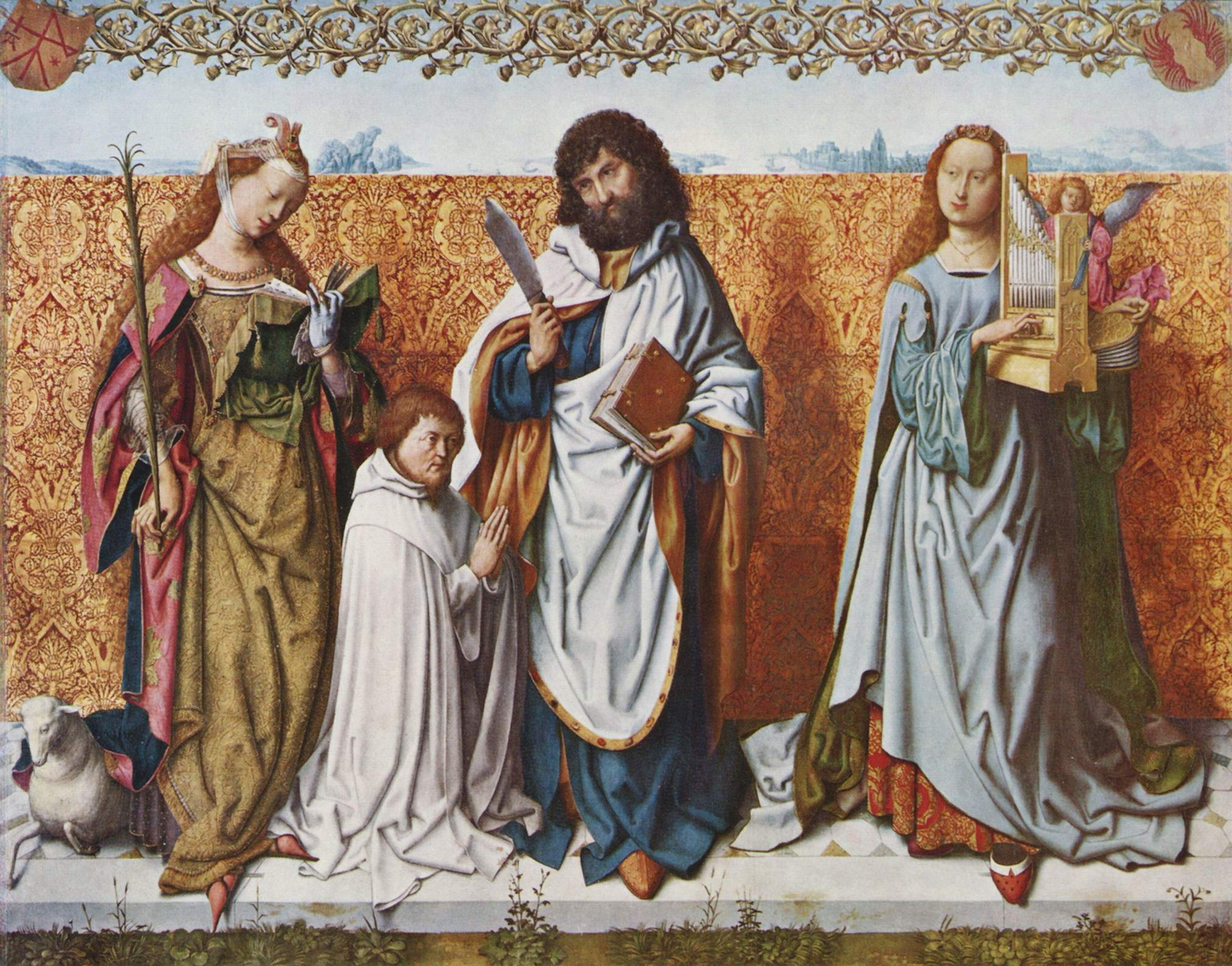
Central panel of the Saint Bartholomew Altarpiece (Alte Pinakothek, Munich)

The Master of the Saint Bartholomew Altarpiece (sometimes called the Master of the Saint Bartholomew Altar) was an Early Netherlandish painter active in Germany, mostly Cologne, between 1475/1480 and 1510. Despite his anonymity, he is one of the most recognizable artists of the early Renaissance period in German art.

It has been said that the Master is the last "Gothic" painter to be active in Cologne. Approximately twenty-five paintings have been attributed to him on the basis of his highly individual style, which does not seem to bear any affinity to that of any other school then active locally. Despite the fact that he seems to have been the leading painter of his time in Cologne, no evidence of any followers, or of a school in the usual sense, may be found.

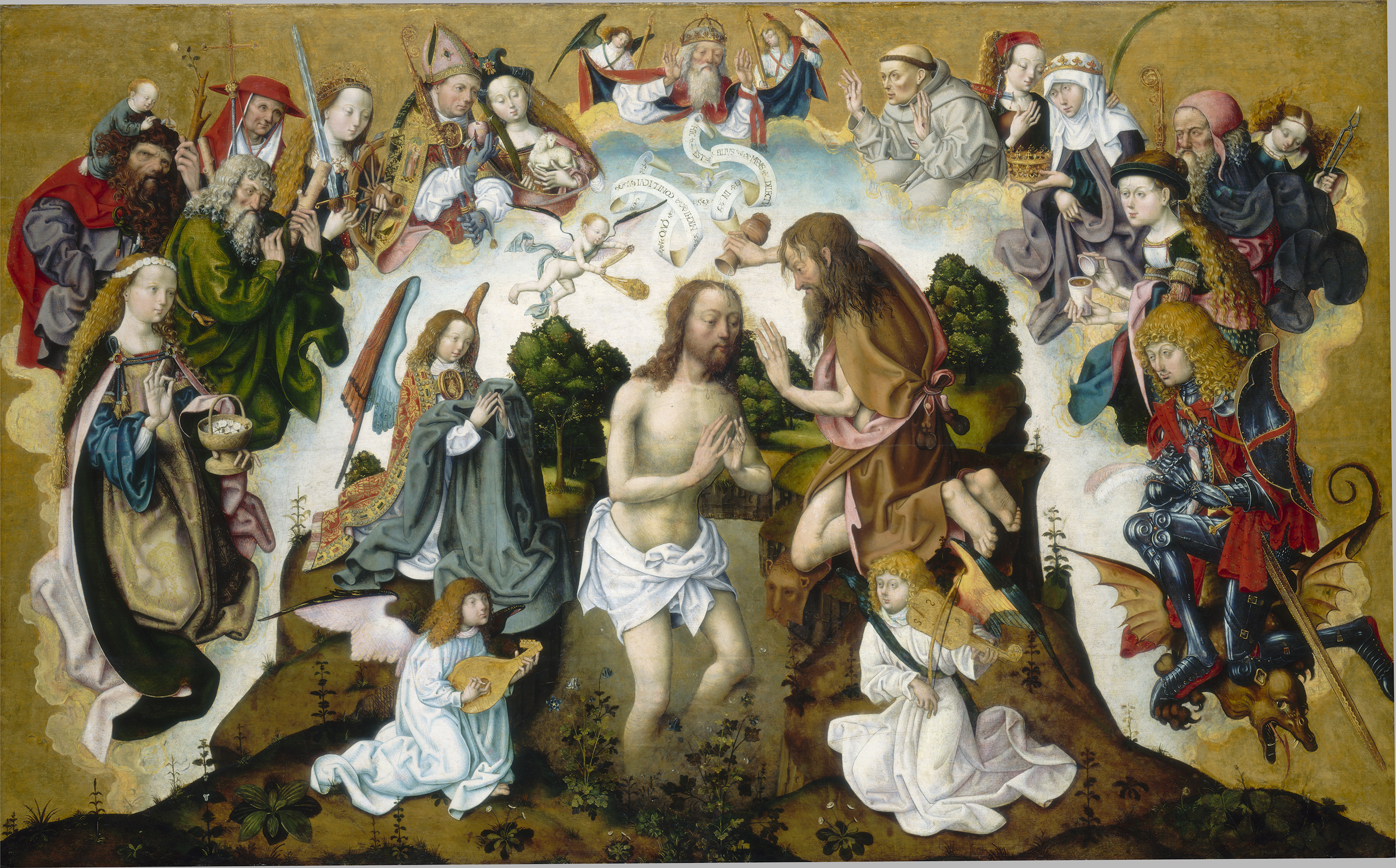
Baptism of Christ, National Gallery of Art

A number of influences, mainly Netherlandish, have been traced in the Master's paintings. These include Dirck Bouts and Rogier van der Weyden, whose influence may be seen in the Munich Madonna and Child with Saint Anne. Stylistically, the Master's paintings are characterized by their use of bright, enamel-like colors and an affinity to the International Gothic style of painting.

== Career ==
Almost nothing is known of his life, including his name; nevertheless, his hand is distinctive enough that scholars have found it fairly easy to trace his career. His name is derived from an altarpiece dated to between 1505 and 1510, depicting Saint Bartholomew flanked by Saint Agnes and Saint Cecilia. The painting is known to have hung in the church of St. Kolumba, Cologne; the inclusion of a Carthusian monk in the picture indicates a possible connection to the Carthusian monastery in that city. In fact, it has been suggested, given the number of commissions he executed for the Carthusian order, that he may himself have been a monk of that order.

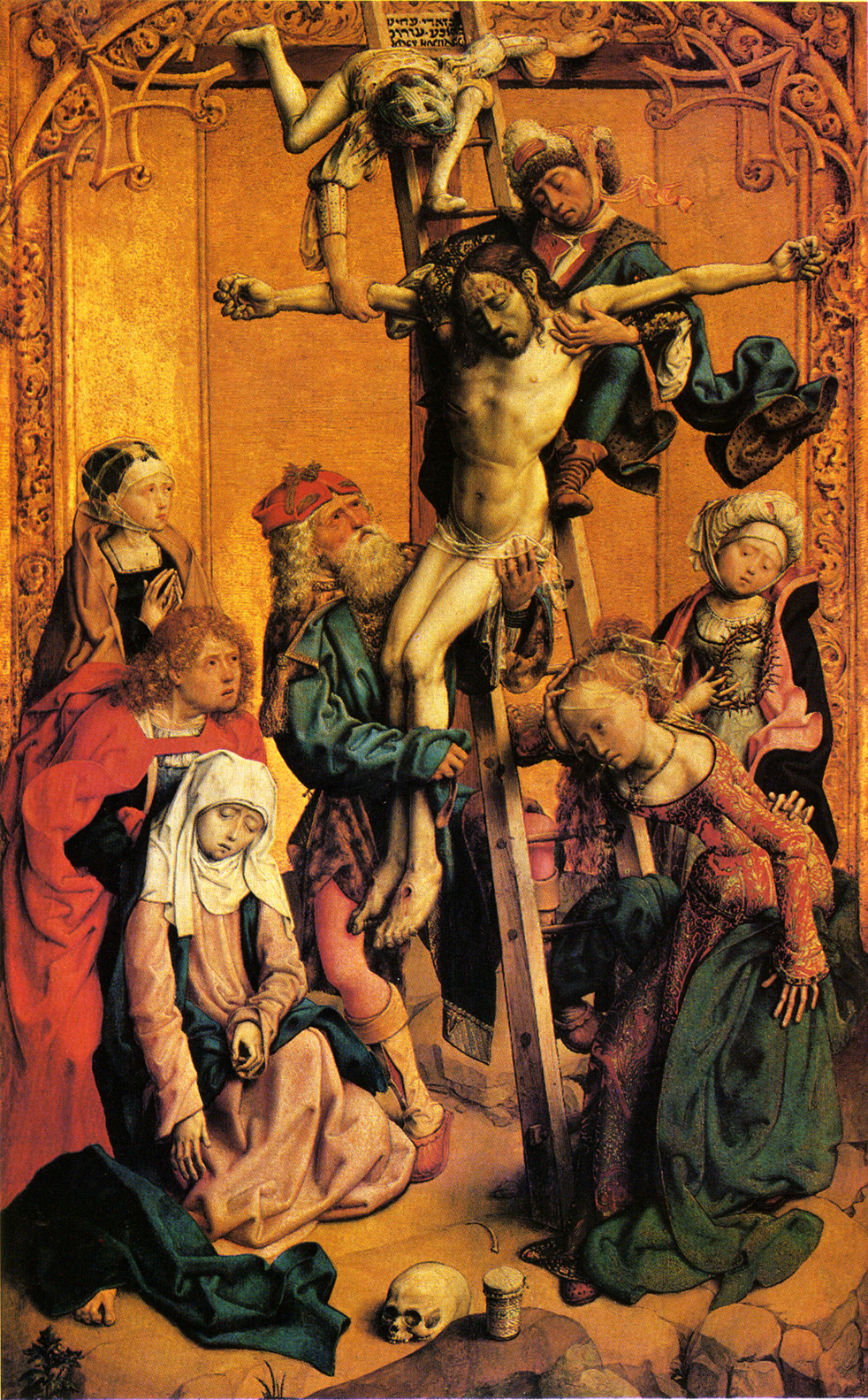
Descent from the Cross (National Gallery, London)

It is now believed that, despite his associations with Cologne, and with German artistic circles, elements of his style suggest that the Master was initially trained in the Netherlands - a point of origin in Utrecht, or in the Gelderland region, has been posited. A Book of Hours, open to an identifiably middle Netherlandish text, in the hand of Saint Columba in a panel attributed to the Master conserved at Mainz, offers a clue to his cultural origins. It is further suggested that he emigrated to Cologne in about 1480. His early style may be seen in the miniatures he painted for the Book of Hours of Sophia van Bylant; the Flagellation in this collection is dated to 1475, the earliest date associated with the Master. The calendar in the book is that of the diocese of Utrecht; nevertheless, certain oddities of language indicate an affinity with Arnhem, which was also the home of the donor.

Other early works, dated to the 1480s, include an Adoration of the Kings and a Madonna and Child with Saint Anne, both of which exhibit affinities with northern Netherlandish painting and may have been created in the Netherlands. Among the very few works attributed to the Master for which the original location is documented are a pair of altarpieces commissioned for the Carthusian monastery in Cologne by a lawyer, Dr. Peter Rinck, and the Deposition, now at the Musée du Louvre, that was executed for the hospital of the Antonite brothers in Paris.

== Collections ==
The Master's work may be found in a number of international museum collections. Three panels from the altarpiece which gave him his name are in the Alte Pinakothek in Munich, and the Deposition for the Order of St Anthony is at the Musée du Louvre. There are four works in the National Gallery, London and a double-sided panel of the Journey of the Magi (or Three Kings) and the Assumption of Mary at the J. Paul Getty Museum in Los Angeles. A Baptism of Christ is in the National Gallery of Art, Washington, D.C. Other paintings are in the Museum of Fine Arts, Boston; the Philadelphia Museum of Art; and the Wallraf-Richartz Museum in Cologne. A Death of the Virgin formerly in Berlin is now lost.

== Gallery ==
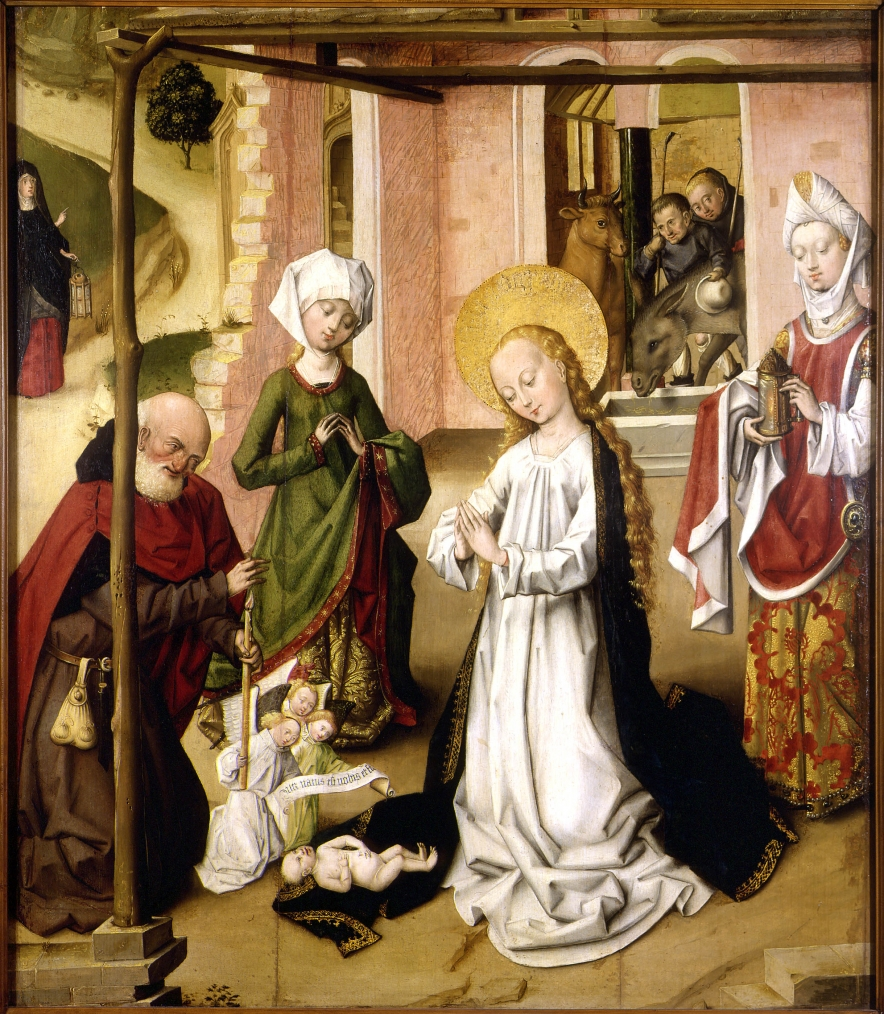
Nativity

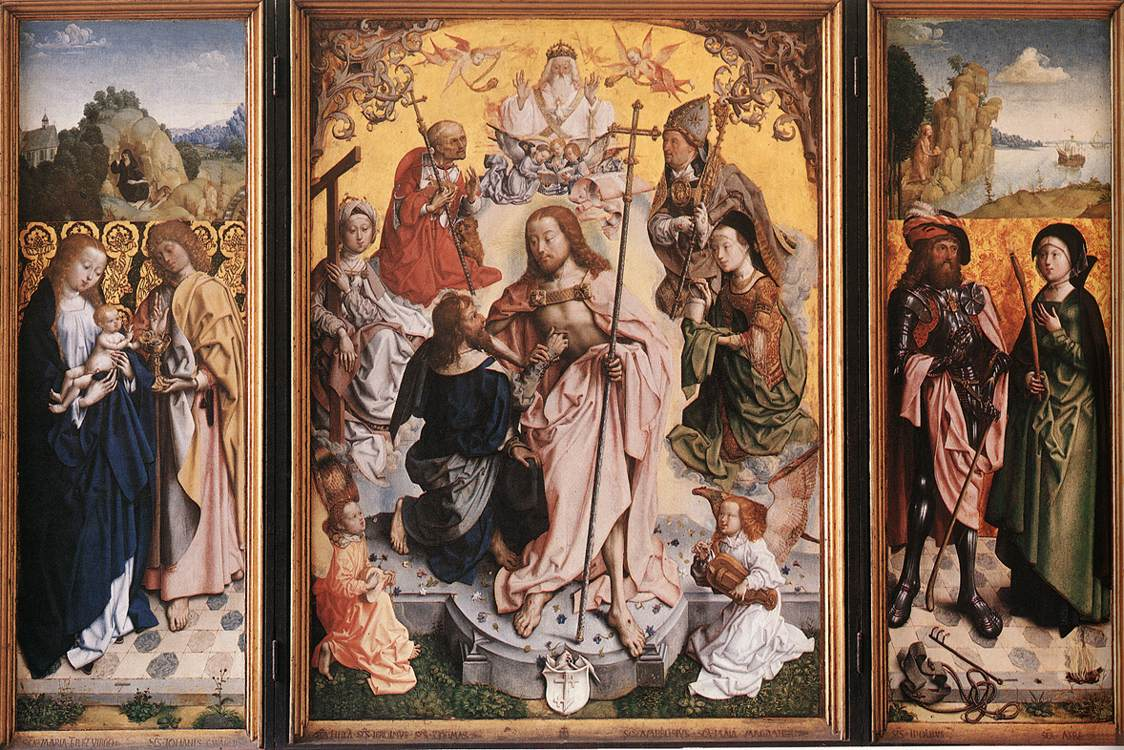
Saint Thomas Altarpiece

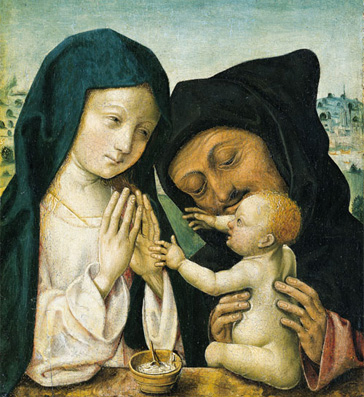
Holy Family

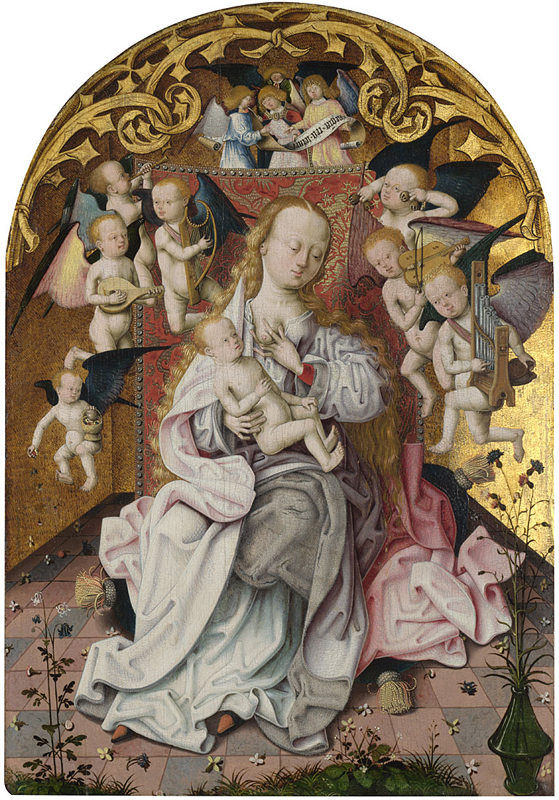
Virgin with Angels
