= Wallraf–Richartz Museum =

Museum in Cologne, Germany

Wallraf-Richartz-Museum & Foundation Corboud

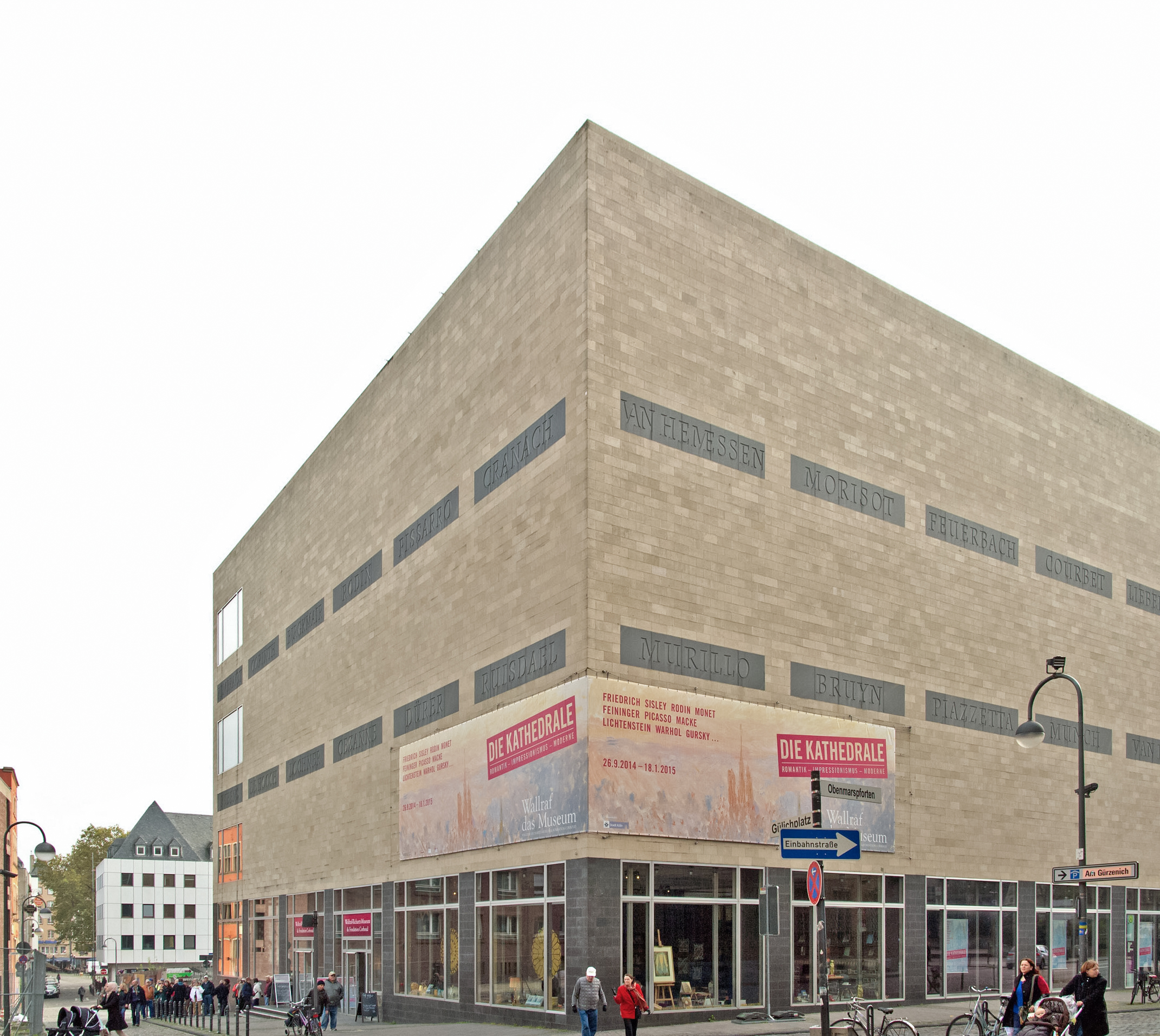
- Wallraf–Richartz Museum
- Established: 1 July 1861; 165 years ago
- Location: Obenmarspforten 40; Am Kölner Rathaus; 50667 Cologne, Germany
- Coordinates: 50°56′15″N 6°57′31″E
- Type: European Fine art: Gothic, Renaissance, Baroque, Impressionist
- Director: Marcus Dekiert
- Public transit access: 5 16 18 Köln Hbf
- Website: www.wallraf.museum/en

The Wallraf–Richartz Museum (full name in German: Wallraf-Richartz-Museum & Fondation Corboud) is an art museum in Cologne, Germany, with a collection of fine art from the medieval period to the early twentieth century. It is one of the three major museums in Cologne.

== History ==
The museum dates back to the year 1824, when the comprehensive collection of medieval art from Ferdinand Franz Wallraf came to the city of Cologne by inheritance. The first building was donated by Johann Heinrich Richartz, and the museum was opened in 1861, just after his death.

The collection was regularly expanded by donations, especially the Haubrich collection of contemporary art in 1946. In 1976, on the occasion of the donation of Mr. and Mrs. Ludwig, the collection was split. The new Museum Ludwig took over the exhibition of the 20th century art.

The current building from 2001, near the Cologne City Hall, was designed by Oswald Mathias Ungers. It stands on the site of the ancient Roman temple to Mars in the Colonia Claudia Ara Agrippinensium.

Also in 2001, Swiss collector Gérard Corboud gave his impressionist and postimpressionist collection of over 170 works to the museum as a permanent loan. The museum then added "Fondation Corboud" to its name.

== Collections ==
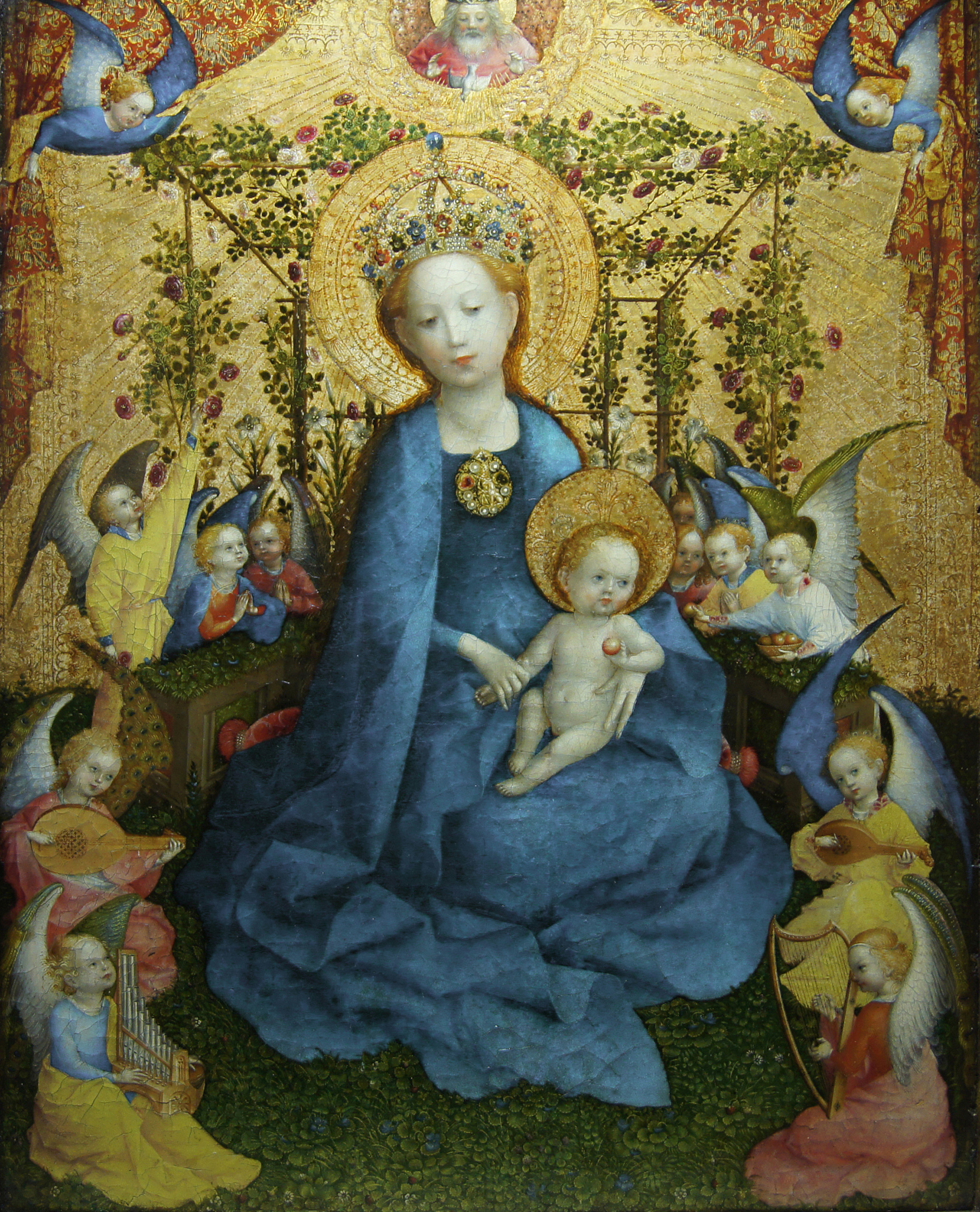
Madonna of the Rose Bower, by Stefan Lochner, 1448

=== Gothic collection ===
The Madonna of the Rose Bower is among the Gothic paintings in the collection of the Wallraf–Richartz Museum. It was created by Stefan Lochner, who lived in Germany between 1410 and 1451, mainly working in Cologne. He is considered a late Gothic painter. His work usually has a clean appearance, combining the Gothic attention to long flowing lines with brilliant colors and a Flemish influence of realism and attention to detail. This painting is considered typical of his style. It was executed about 1450, and shows the Virgin and Child reposing in a blooming rose arbor that is attended by Lochner's characteristic, child angels. Another outstanding Gothic painting in the Wallraf-Richartz's collection is an Arrest of Jesus by the "Master of the Karlsruhe Passion", the only surviving panel of that painter's influential Passion cycle not kept in the Staatliche Kunsthalle Karlsruhe.

=== Renaissance collection ===
The Wallraf-Richartz-Museum houses an altarpiece (1515) from the Great Saint Martin Church in Cologne, one of the few known works by Jacob van Utrecht. Among other early Renaissance works in the collection are the Adoration of the Child by an unknown artist; previously thought to have been painted by Hieronymus Bosch, and a panel of the Jabach Altarpiece by Albrecht Dürer.

=== Baroque collection ===
Among the artists in the collection from the Baroque through Rococo period are works by Rubens (Juno and Argus, 1610); Rembrandt (self-portrait); Jordaens; Frans Snyders; van Dyck; Frans Hals; Gerard van Honthorst; Pieter de Hooch; Gerard de Lairesse; François Boucher; Nicolas de Largillierre; Jean-Honoré Fragonard; Marguerite Gérard, and Giambattista Pittoni.

=== Impressionist collection ===
The Wallraf-Richartz collection includes works by the Impressionists Monet, Pissarro, Sisley, Gustave Caillebotte, and Berthe Morisot.

== Monet forgery discovered ==
On 14 February 2008, the Wallraf–Richartz Museum announced that On the Banks of the Seine by Port Villez, attributed to Claude Monet, was a forgery. The discovery was made when the painting was examined by restorers prior to an upcoming Impressionism exhibition. X-ray and infrared testing revealed that a "colorless substance" had been applied to the canvas to make it appear older. The picture was acquired by the museum in 1954. The museum, which will keep the forgery, still has five authentic Monet paintings in its collection.

== Gallery of art ==
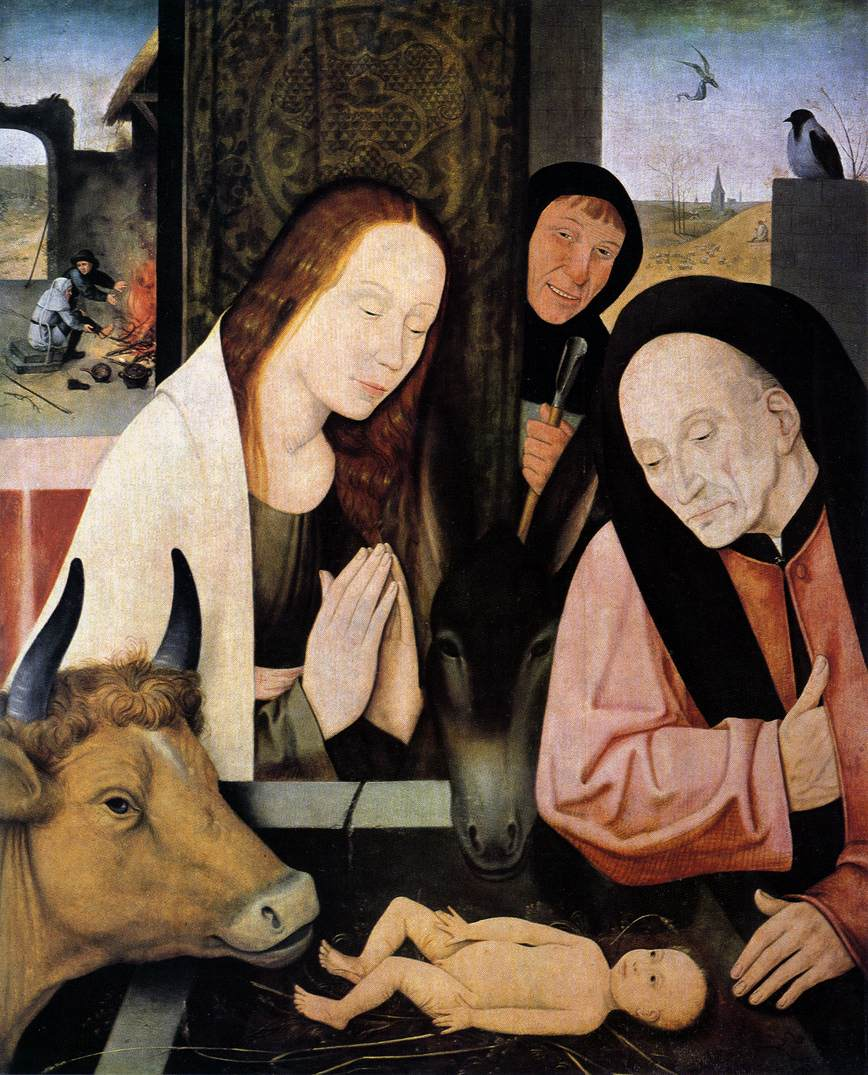
Hieronymus Bosch, Adoration of the Child, c. 1568 or later

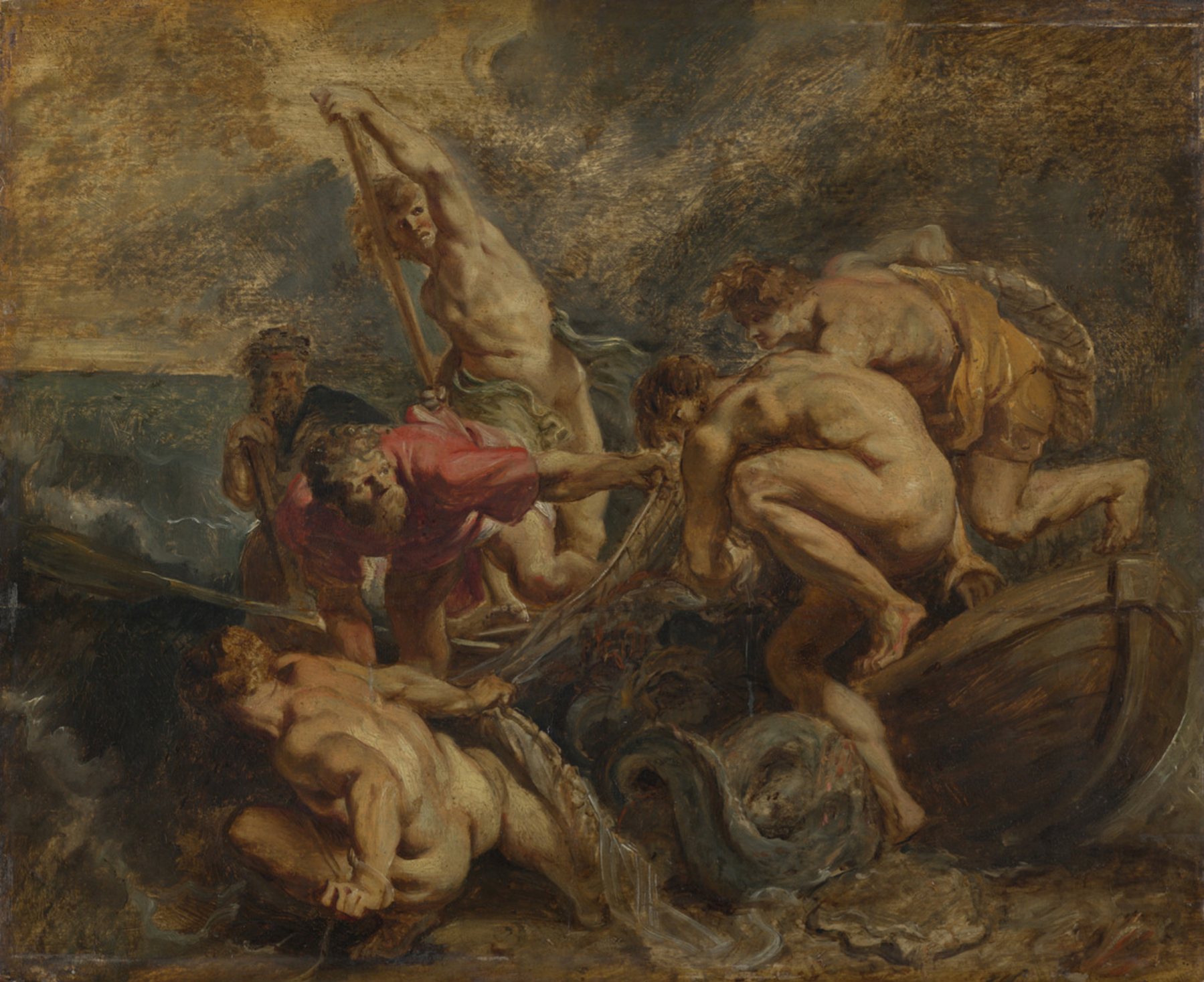
Peter Paul Rubens, Miraculous Catch of Fish, 1610

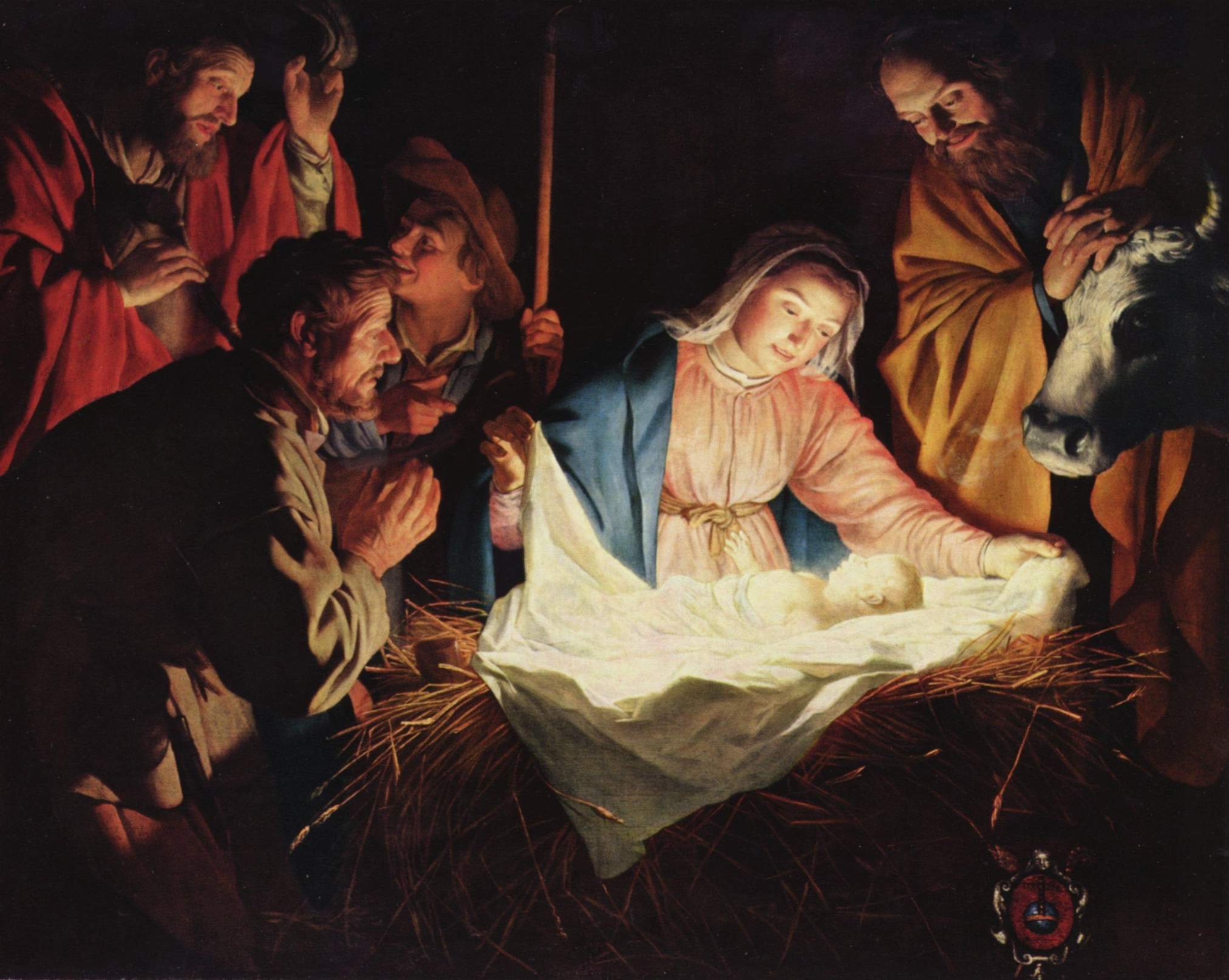
Gerard van Honthorst, Adoration of the Shepherds, 1622

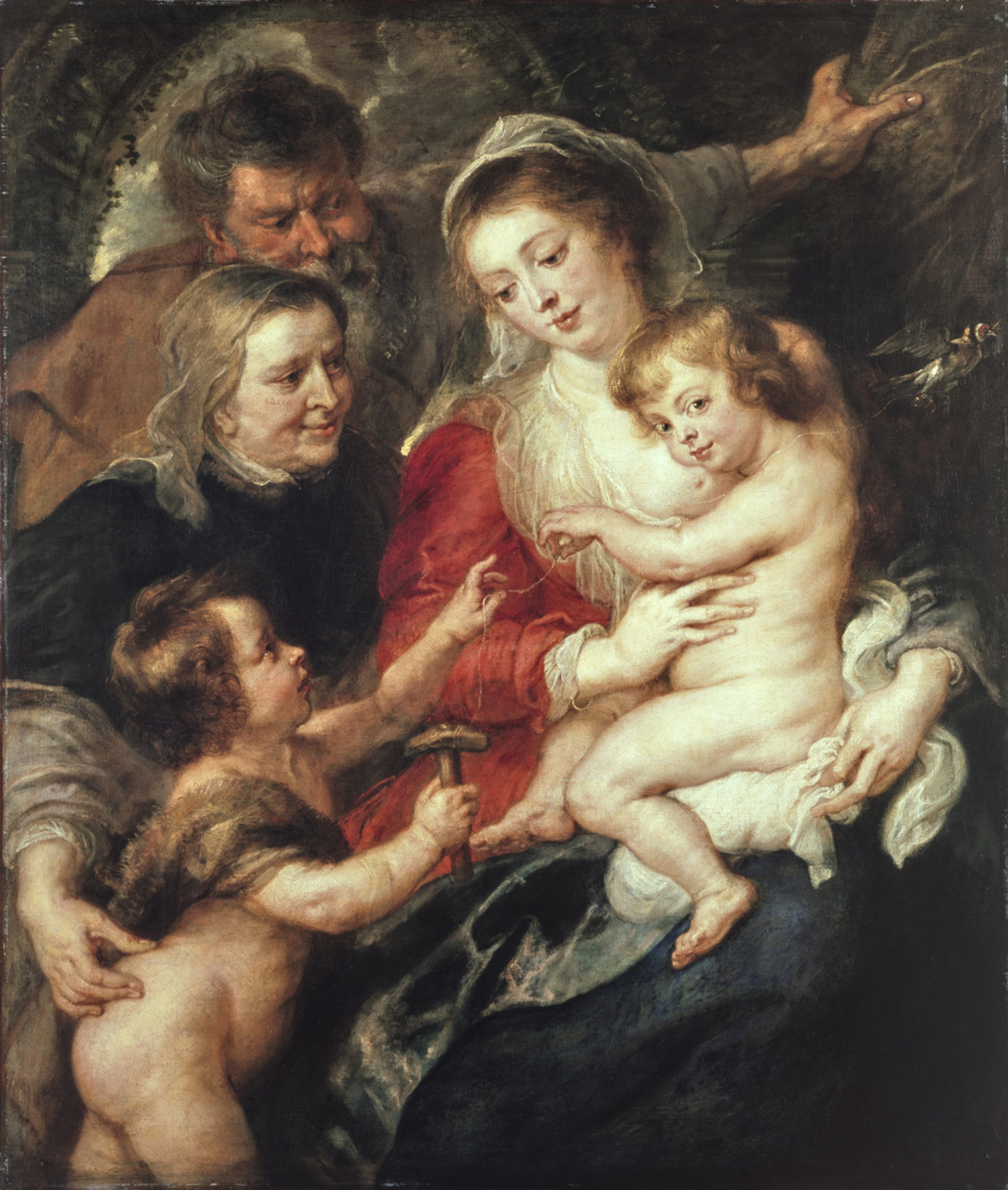
Rubens, Holy Family, 1634

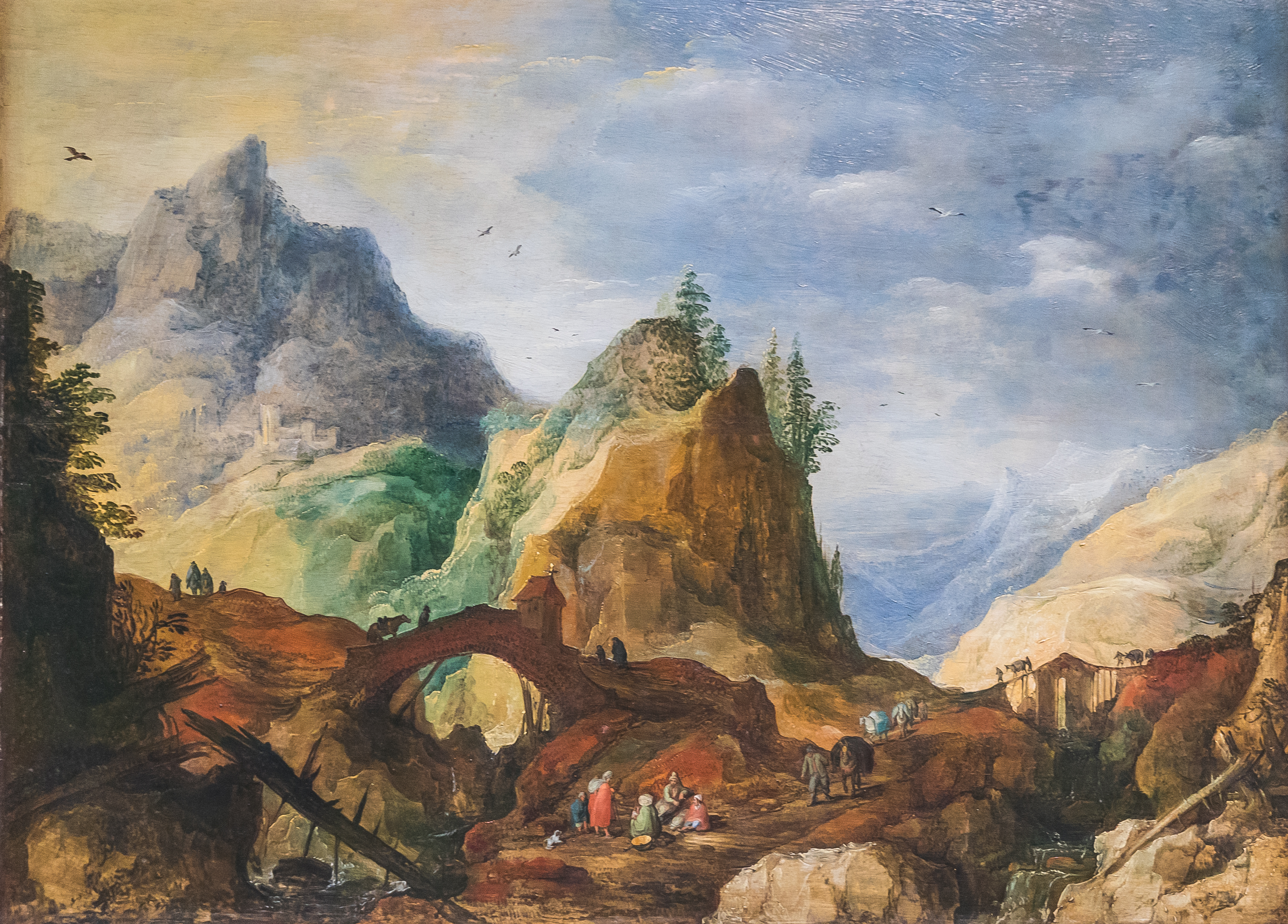
Joos de Momper, Mountain Scene with Bridges, late 16th, early 17th ct.

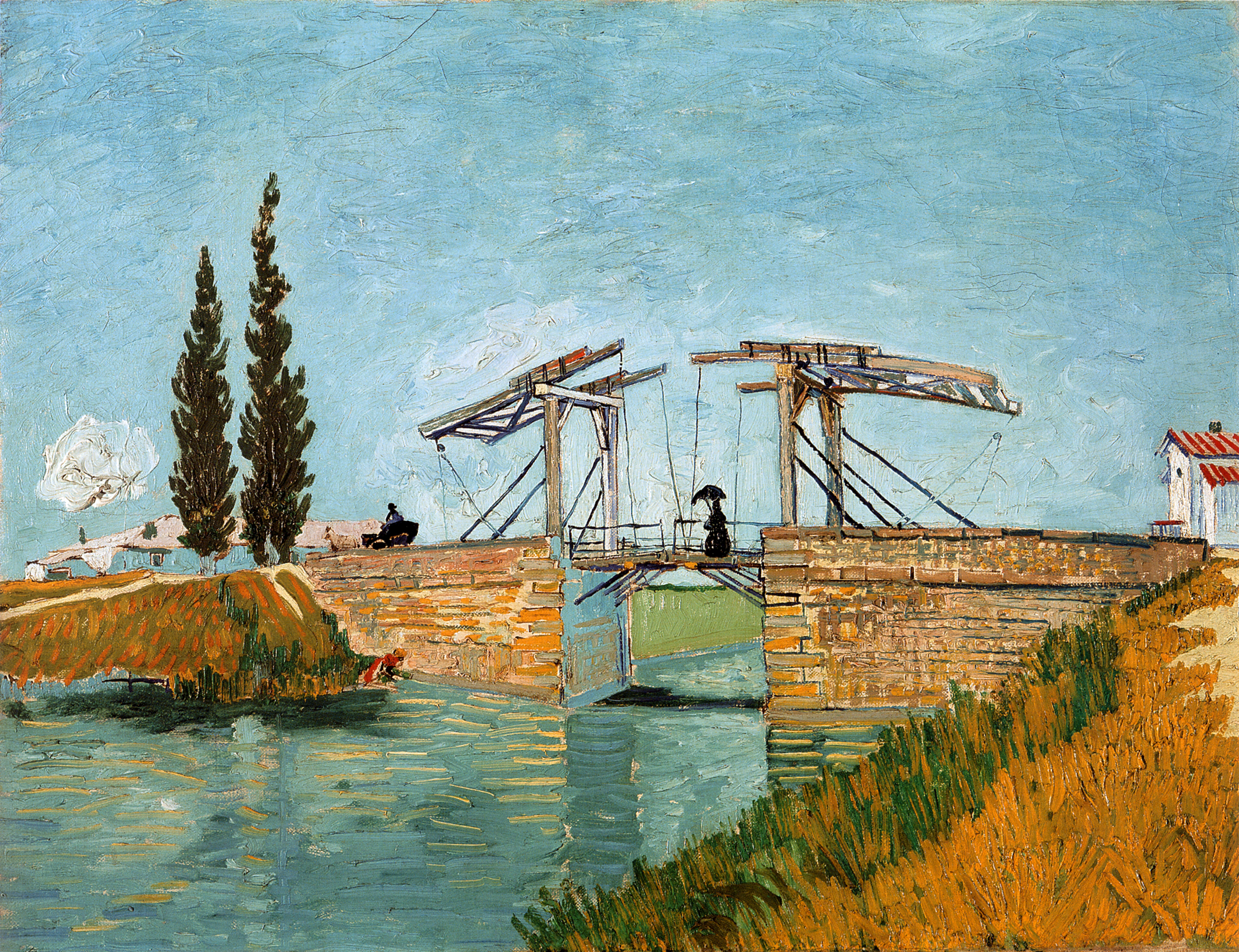
Van Gogh, Langlois Bridge at Arles, 1888

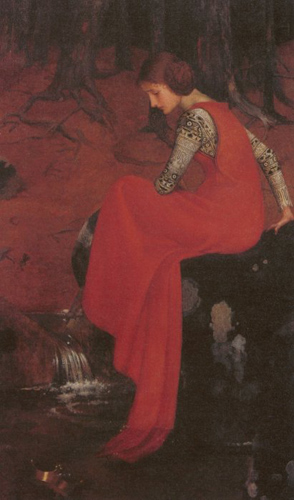
Marianne Stokes, Melisande, 1895–1898

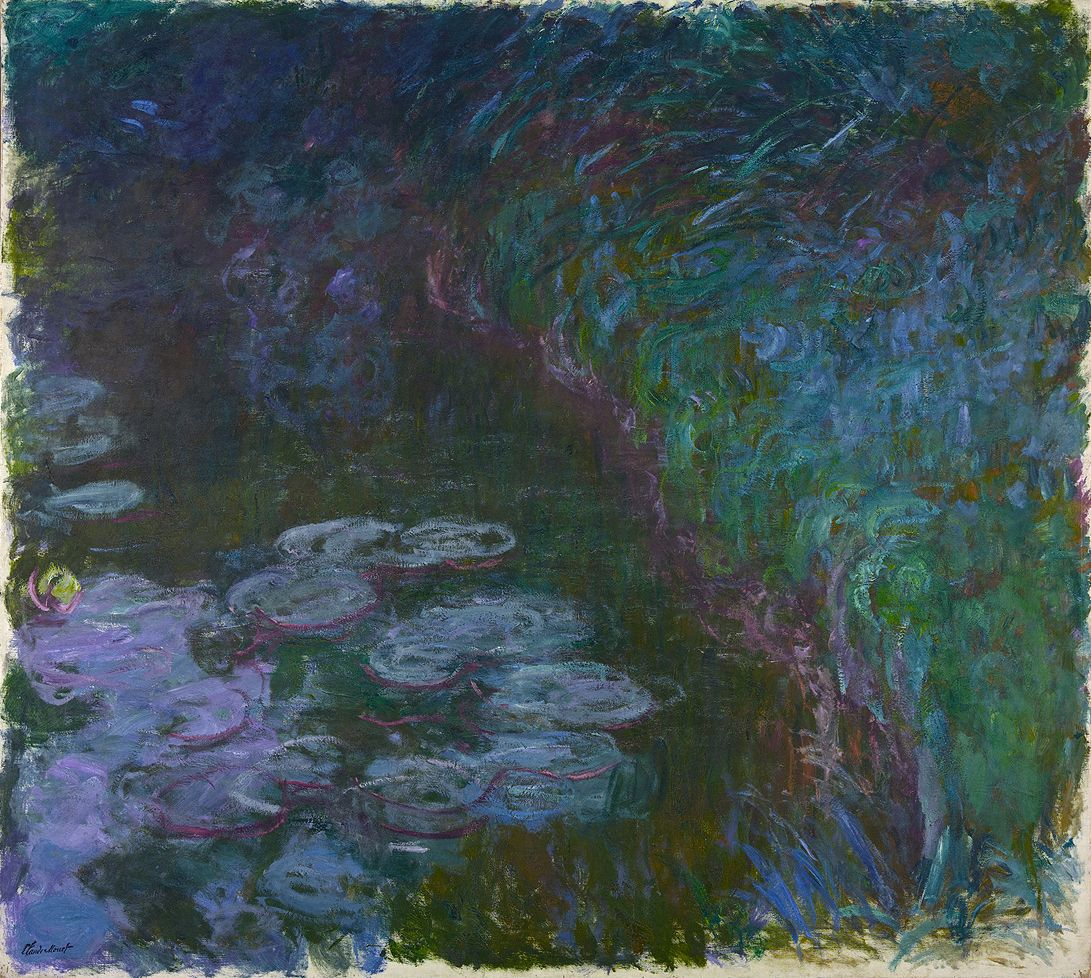
Claude Monet, Waterlilies (cat. raisonée Dep. 0377; W 1852)

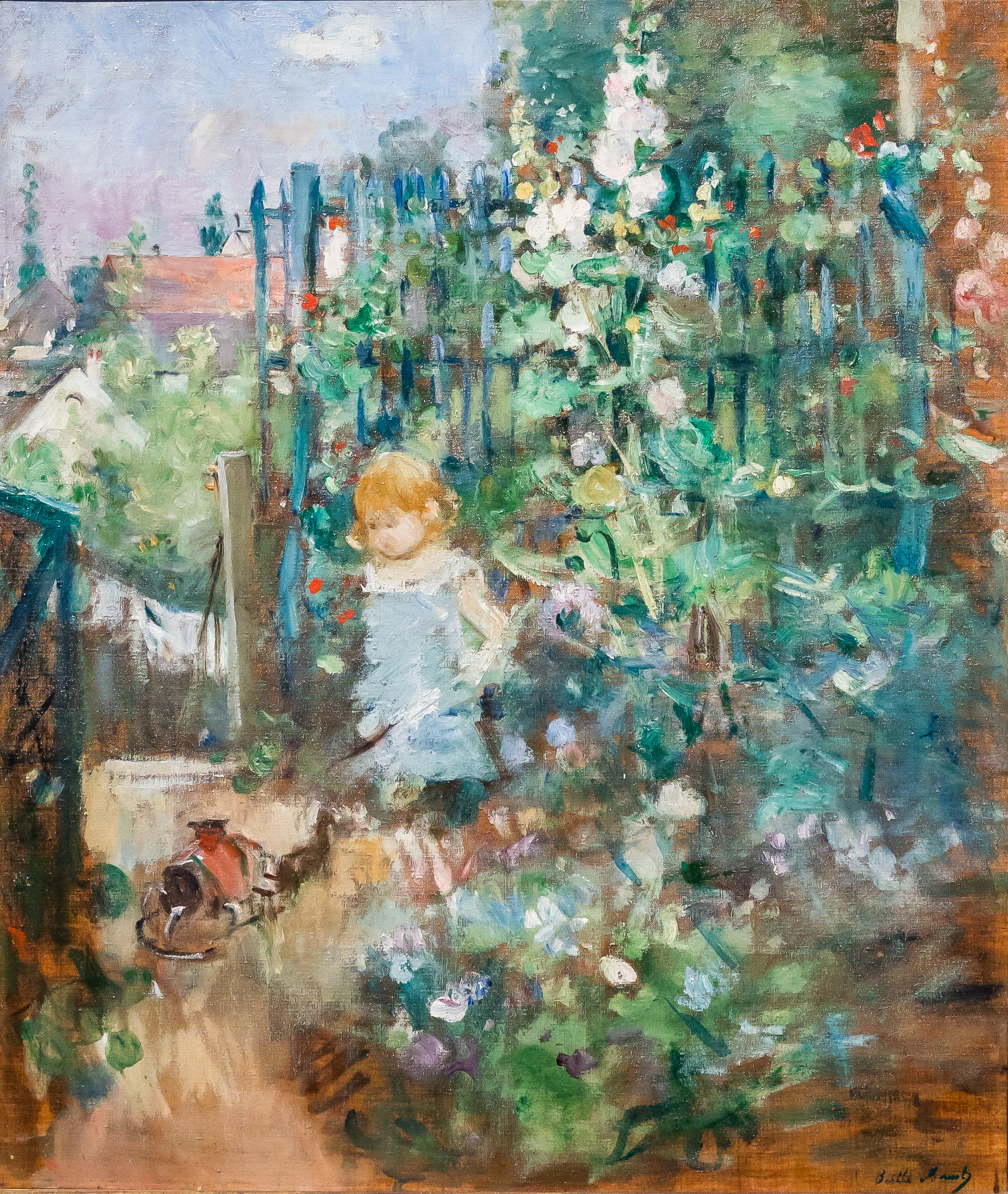
Berthe Morisot, Child Among Staked Roses, 1881

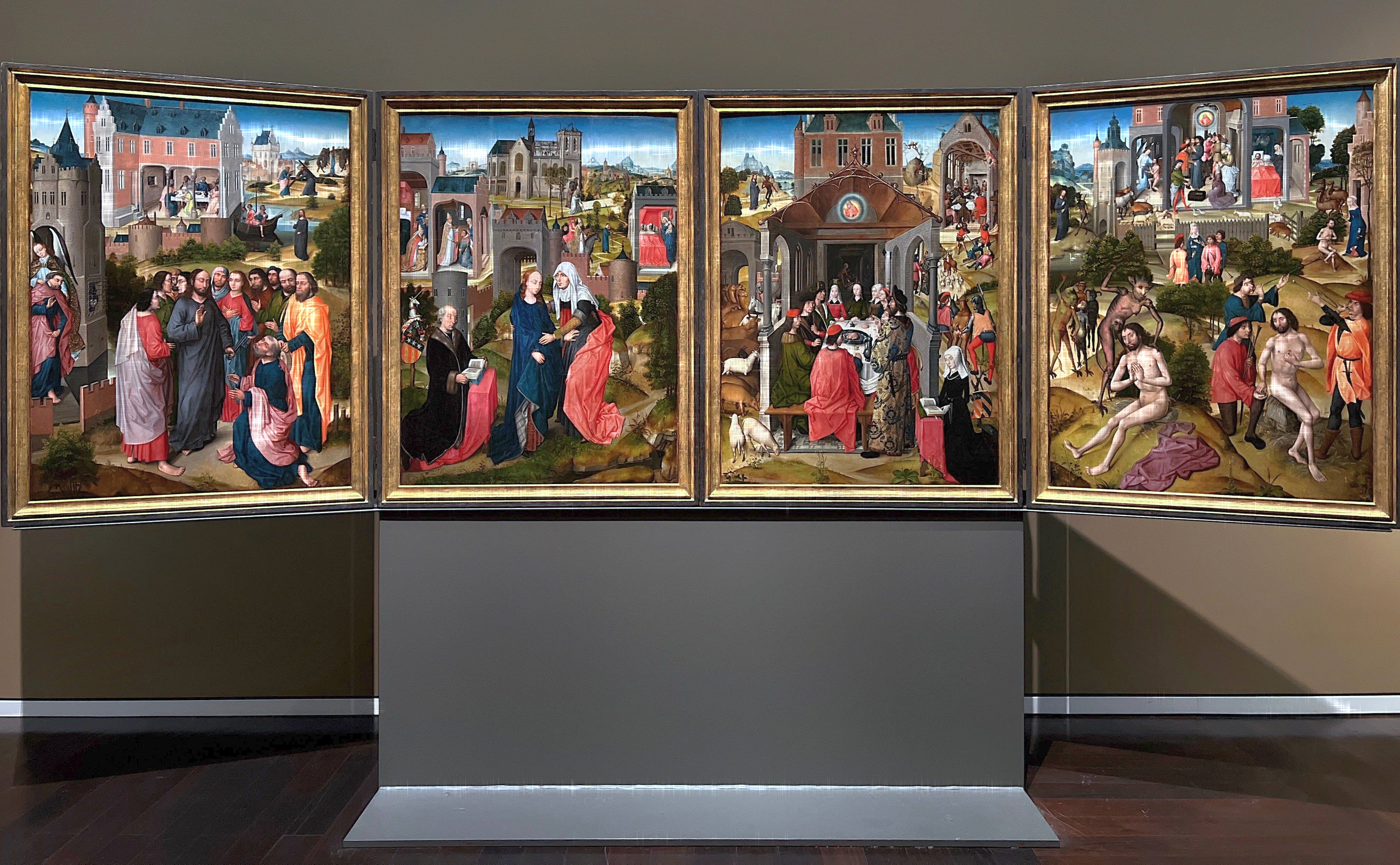
Triptych of the Life of Job

== See also ==
- Max Silberberg
- List of claims for restitution for Nazi-looted art
