= Adoration of the Magi (Dürer) =

1504 painting by Albrecht Dürer

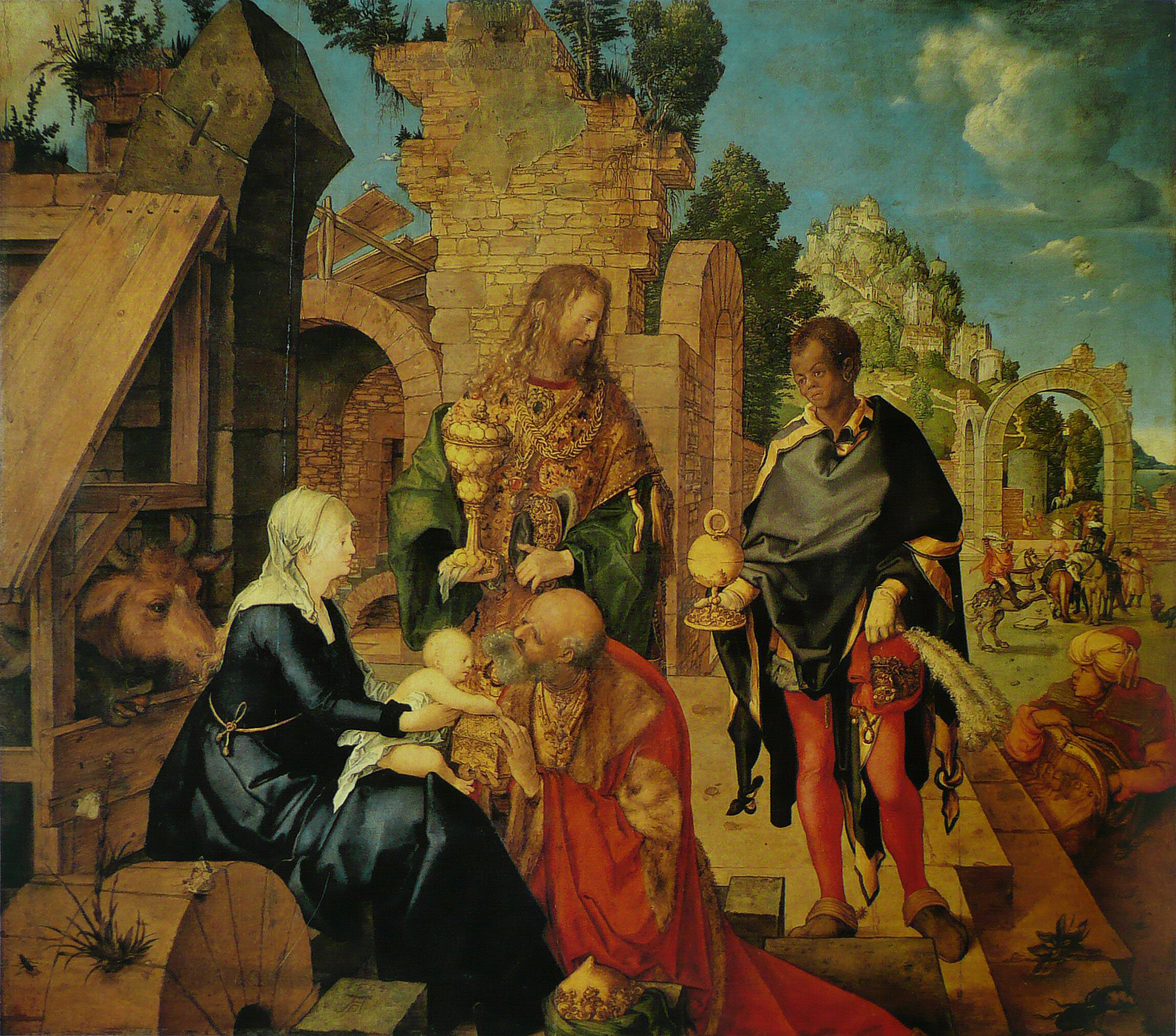
- Artist: Albrecht Dürer
- Year: 1504
- Medium: Oil on wood
- Dimensions: 99 cm × 113.5 cm (39 in × 44.7 in)
- Location: Uffizi; Florence

The Adoration of the Magi is a panel painting by Albrecht Dürer (1471-1528), produced under commission by Frederick the Wise for the altar of the Schlosskirche in Wittenberg. It is considered one of Dürer's best and most important works from the period between his first and second trips to Italy (1494-5 and 1505). The work is modest in size, just over a metre wide, however it is of great importance in Dürer's oeuvre and in the history of art. Before the production of this work, Dürer's achievements lay largely in his printmaking career, or with his self-portraiture. This work is especially crucial in its distinction of Dürer's difference as he combines a fine balance of northern and Italianate conventions in the work. Heinrich Wölfflin referred to the work as “the first completely lucid painting in the history of German art”.

In 1603 Christian II of Saxony presented the painting as a gift to the Holy Roman Emperor Rudolf II. It remained in the imperial collection in Vienna until 1792, when Luigi Lanzi, the director of the Uffizi, acquired it in exchange for Fra Bartolomeo's Presentation in the Temple.

In the European image of the Adoration of the Magi, it is a common convention to represent the third king as a black figure. In Dürer's composition, this figure dominates the right portion of the painting, counterbalancing the cluster of the other four figures on the left (organised in a pyramid structure) due to his difference. This is a key feature in the painting, as the viewer's ocular curiosity is drawn to the third king, which leads the eye around the image through his gaze. His difference is articulated in spatial terms as he appears on the outside, surrounded by nature rather than the architectural features that sit behind the other figures.

In Dürer's imagining of the piece, he also features himself as the second king. Dürer is well known for his self-portraits, and so his physiognomy is recognisable, matched with his beard and long golden hair. This is a crucial difference in Albrecht Dürer's construction of the work. His self-characterization is further substantiated by the alignment of the second king and the artists' famous monogram, which appears on a block in the foreground. Even so, there is nothing unusual in forming one of the Magi from a portrait of a real individual. This is a tradition that feigns a sense of diplomacy and dynastic ceremony and occurred in images of the Adoration before the convention of the inclusion of a black figure. This highlights Dürer's construction of the composition using both traditional and imagined stylistic details.

Similarly found in later Antwerp Adorations, Dürer constructs the composition with a fusion of stylistic inclusivity combining northern naturalism with Italianate use of perspective, ideal proportions and colour. Pure reds, green, and blue can be found in composition, as well as bright golden features illuminating the wealth and exoticism of the objects within the pictorial space. This places an emphasis on the exotic elements that allude to the Wunderkammer that have inspired the work. Images of the Adoration often functioned as reminders of the mythic insignia of the collecting enterprise itself and stood on top of the household treasury cupboard or tresoor. A notable example of such detail in the composition include the foreign servant of the black Magus, who appears wearing a turban à la Turque. This exoticism is also reflected in the detailed garb of the kings, and the jewels and ornaments that surround them.

Completed in the same year as his famous engraving, Adam and Eve (1504), Dürer incorporates stylistic elements from his construction of the figure of Adam in the second and third Magi. In his production of the black King, Dürer has organised the figure in contrapposto, with a particular refinement of the anatomy of his legs, as well as the position of his feet. The second Magus borrows Adam's downward gaze and idealised normative profile.

A key part of the composition is its spatial and structural formation, which is precisely detailed through the use of perspective. Architectural archways are formed throughout the background, including some that are broken, and some that are only partly visible to the viewer's eye. This works to avoid defining structure in the composition in a permanent way, allowing nature to also organise the vastness of the pictorial space. Dürer's wide-ranging skills are also displayed in the composition in the finer details, including the animals found within the stables, as well as the plants that are scattered about the lower and upper portions of the image.

Dürer's painting oeuvre has not been as widely criticized as his graphic works. Due to his geographical location, and skill in other mediums, Dürer's reception as a painter is falsely assumed as being of inferior quality as opposed to his prints and drawings. Nevertheless, the painting is of high quality and is extremely detailed. It presents a fine stylistic balance, a consequence of Dürer's years spent travelling, as well as his various studies as a theorist.

Some art historians suggest that this painting could have been the central panel of the Jabach Altarpiece. Two panels, one in Frankfurt and one in Cologne, representing the Story of Job, known as the Jabach Altarpiece are of the same measurements and were made at a similar time as the Adoration of the Magi. It has been suggested by various scholars, including Erwin Panofsky, that these three paintings may have been intended to form a triptych with the Adoration as the centrepiece.

Throughout his career, Dürer produced two works directly related to this painting, at least in its subject. There is a study of an African man from 1508, Portrait of an African, completed in charcoal and currently held by the Albertina. This is believed to be a preliminary study for the later 1524 reimagining of the Adoration of the Magi in pen-and-ink.

== See also ==
- List of paintings by Albrecht Dürer
