= Mountain Scene with Bridges =

Painting by Joos de Momper

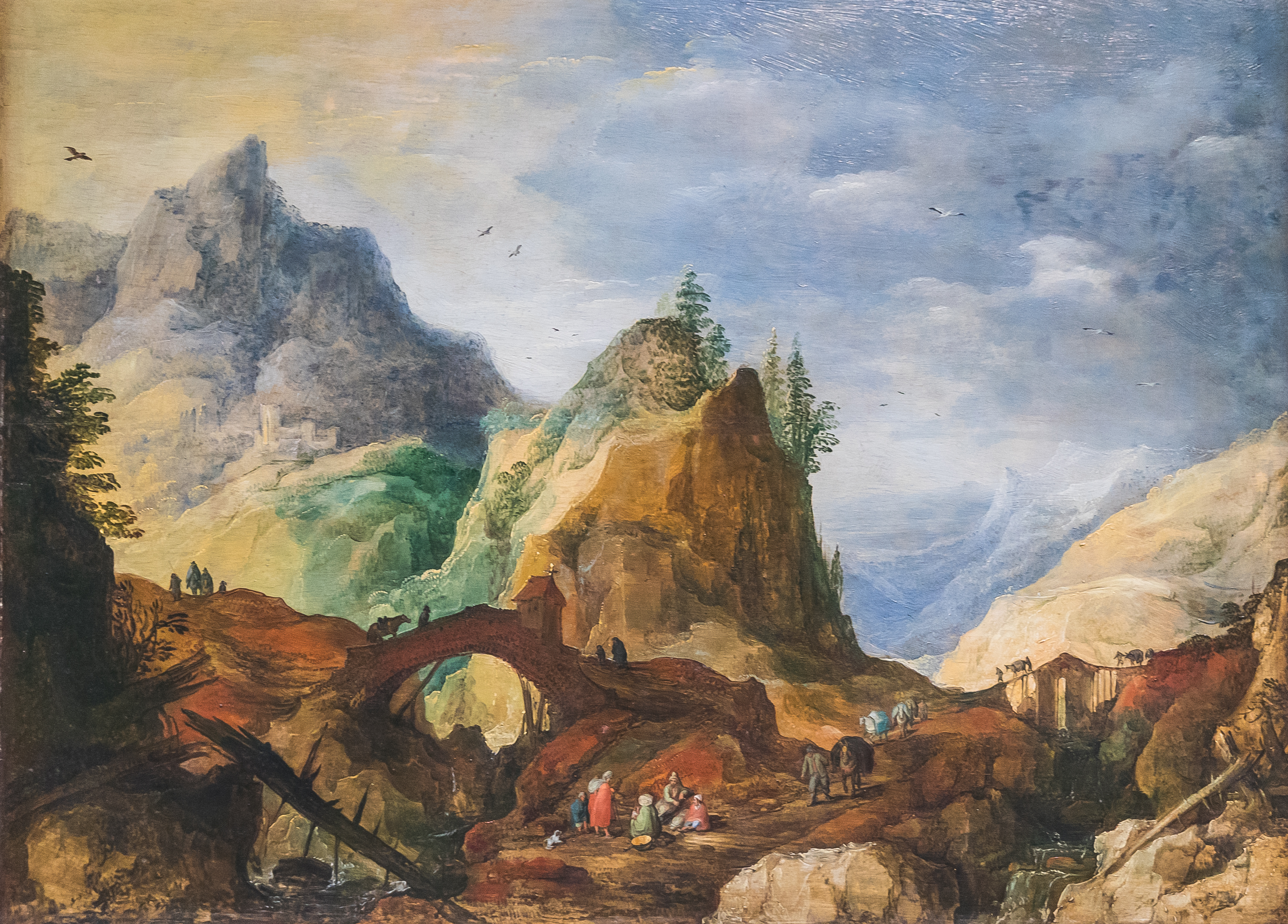
- Artist: Joos de Momper
- Year: c. 1600
- Medium: Oil on panel
- Dimensions: 53 cm × 20.8 cm (17.7 in × 28.2 in)
- Location: Wallraf–Richartz Museum, Cologne

Mountain Scene with Bridges is an oil-on-oak-panel painting by Flemish painter Joos de Momper.

The painting is currently housed at the Wallraf–Richartz Museum in Cologne.
