= Juno and Argus =

1610 painting by Peter Paul Rubens

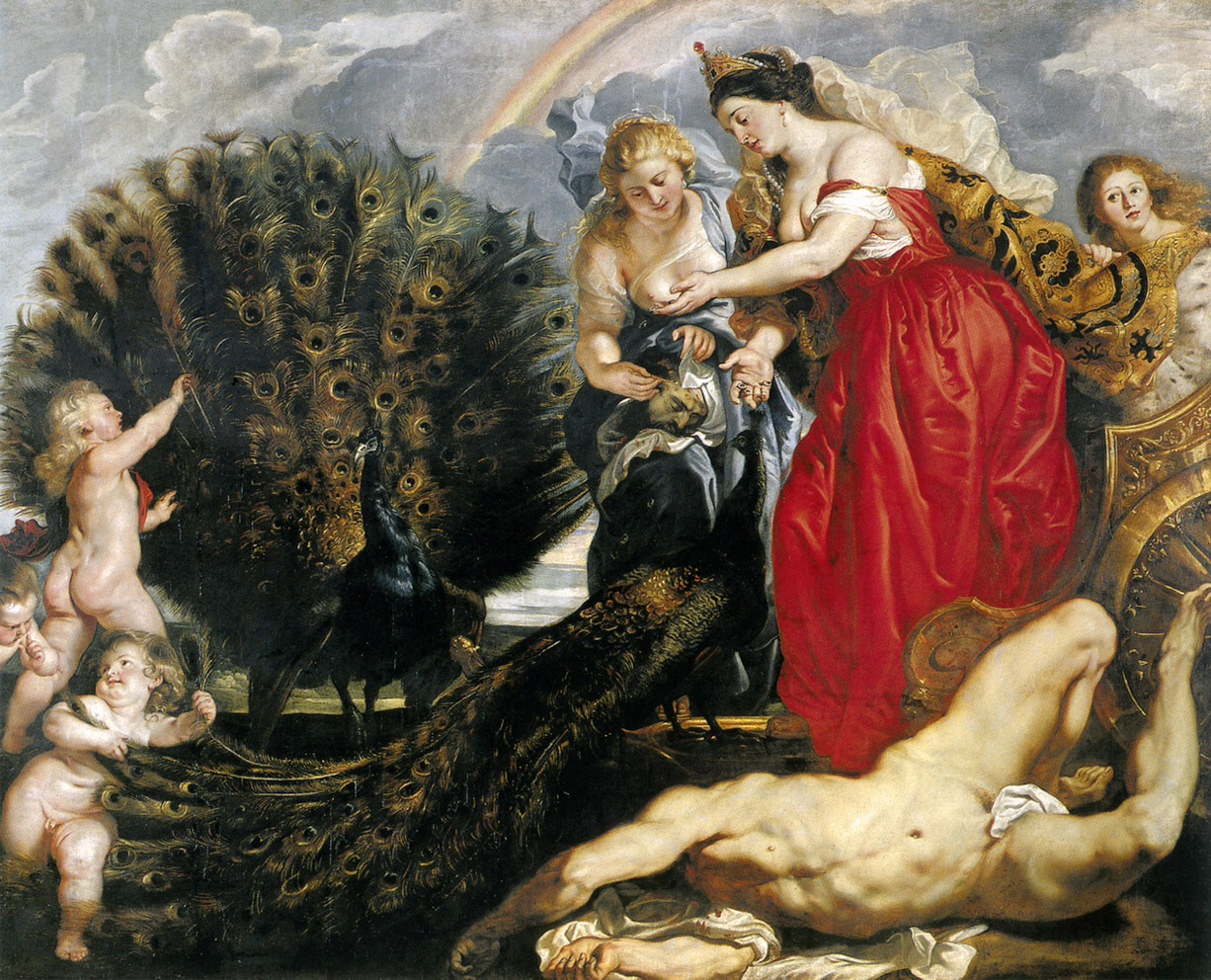
- Artist: Peter Paul Rubens
- Year: c 1610
- Medium: oil on canvas
- Dimensions: 249 cm × 296 cm (98 in × 117 in)
- Location: Wallraf-Richartz Museum; Cologne

Juno and Argus is a 1610 painting by Peter Paul Rubens, depicting Juno and Argus. It is now in the Wallraf-Richartz Museum (inventory number WRM 1040) in Cologne.
