= Jabach Altarpiece =

Painting by Albrecht Dürer, c.1503

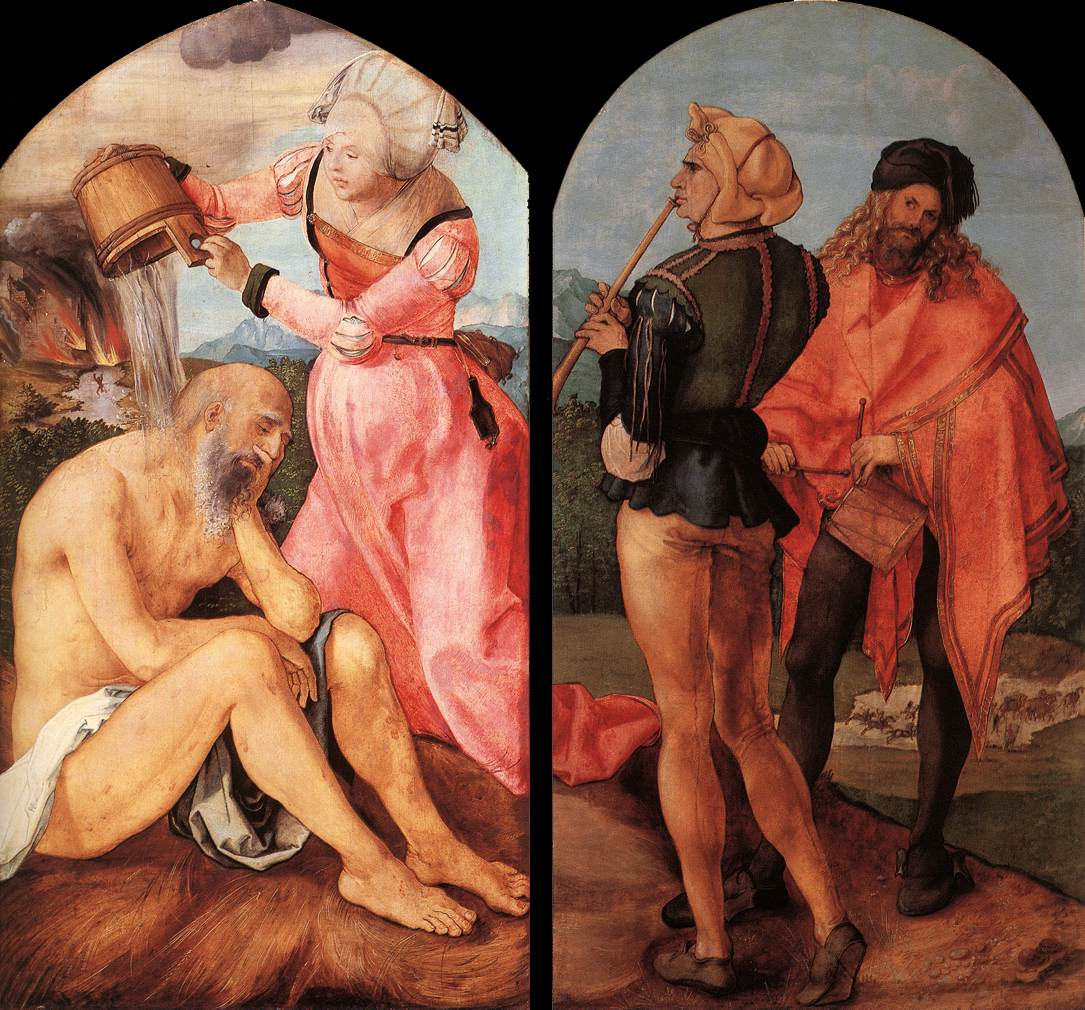
- Artist: Albrecht Dürer
- Year: c. 1503–1504
- Medium: Oil on panel
- Location: Alte Pinakothek, Munich Städel, Frankfurt Wallraf-Richartz Museum, Cologne

The Jabach Altarpiece comprises two pairs of oil on lime tree panel paintings by German Renaissance artist Albrecht Dürer, executed around 1503–1504. Originally a triptych, the central panels are lost. Only the outer and inner side panels are now preserved: the left picture with Job and His Wife, measuring 96 × 51.5 cm, is housed in the Städel of Frankfurt; the picture of the Piper and a Drummer on the right, measuring 94 × 57 cm, is housed in the Wallraf-Richartz Museum of Cologne. These two certain paintings of the Jabach Altarpiece form a single image on the external shutters once closed. The two share a common background, and the dress of Job's wife continues to the right panel as well.

The two pairs of Apostles on gilded background now at the Alte Pinakothek in Munich –Sts. Joseph and Joachim (96 × 54 cm), and Sts. Simon and Lazarus (97 × 55 cm)– have been commonly associated with the polyptych. They are supposedly the panels on the inside of the wings.

== History ==
The altarpiece was probably commissioned by Frederick III, Elector of Saxony, for a chapel in his castle at Wittenberg, perhaps in occasion of the end of the plague in 1503.

The reconstruction of the work is disputed. Some art historians identify the central panel with the Uffizi Adoration of the Magi, while according to others there was instead a group of sculptures.

It is named after one of its owners, Everhard Jabach, in whose family chapel it was still hanging in the late 18th century, before being split up and scattered to different locations.

== Description ==
The left panel depicts the prophet Job seated on a dungheap, with a desperate expression on his face, after Satan has defied him to keep his allegiance to God even in the most tremendous afflictions. These include his flock getting scattered in the other panel, while his properties are on fire at the left edge. Further, his skin is covered by blisters, an appropriate element for a painting likely originated as an ex-voto for the end of plague. His wife, dressed in Renaissance garments, is pouring dirty water above him, while a small devil flees in the far background.

The right panel shows two standing musicians. The right one, with the drum, is perhaps a self-portrait. Their meaning has not been explained: they could be a further element of mockery against Job, or, instead, an attempt to console him through music.

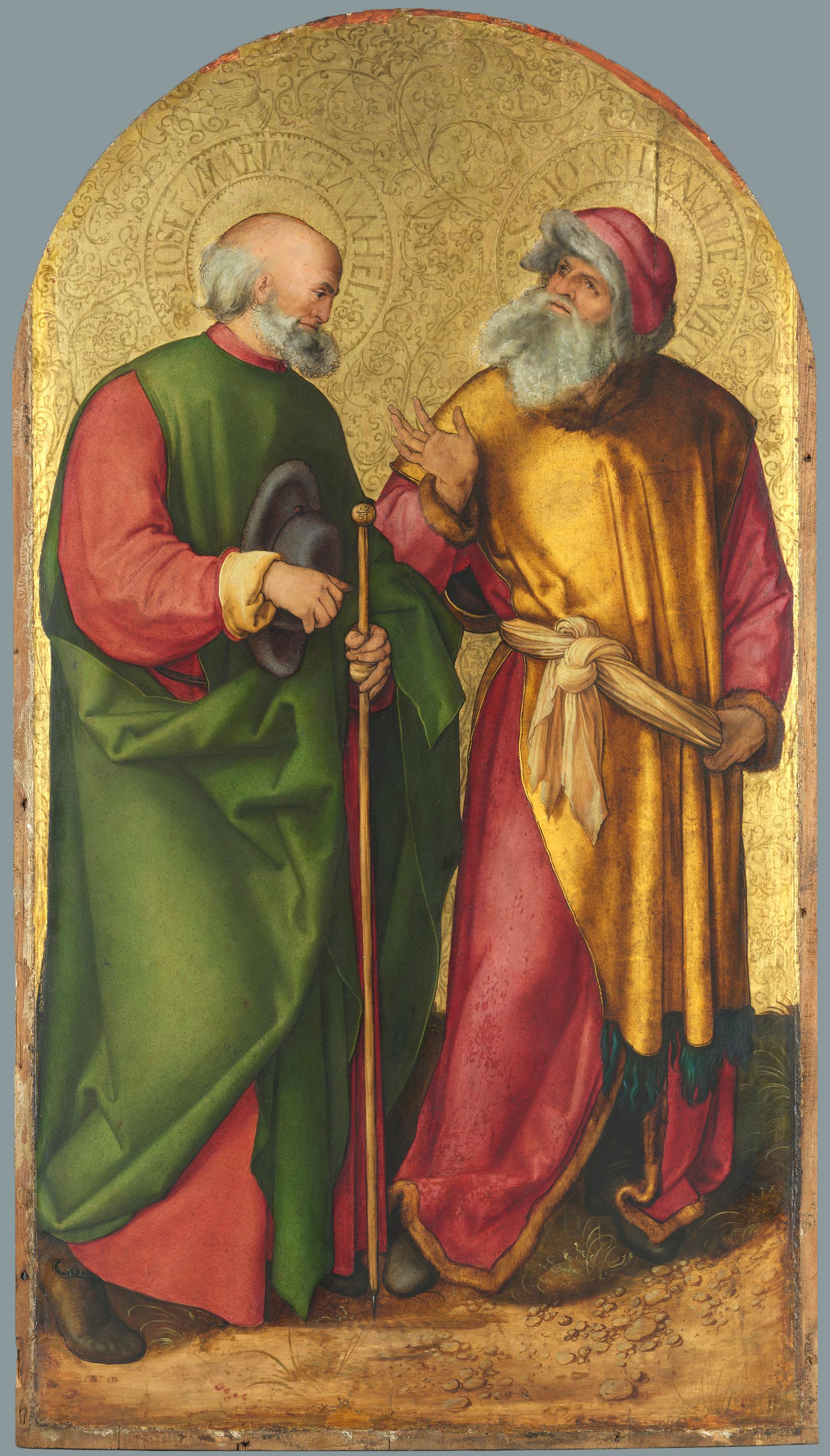
Sts. Joseph and Joachim, Munich, Alte Pinakothek (WAF 228)

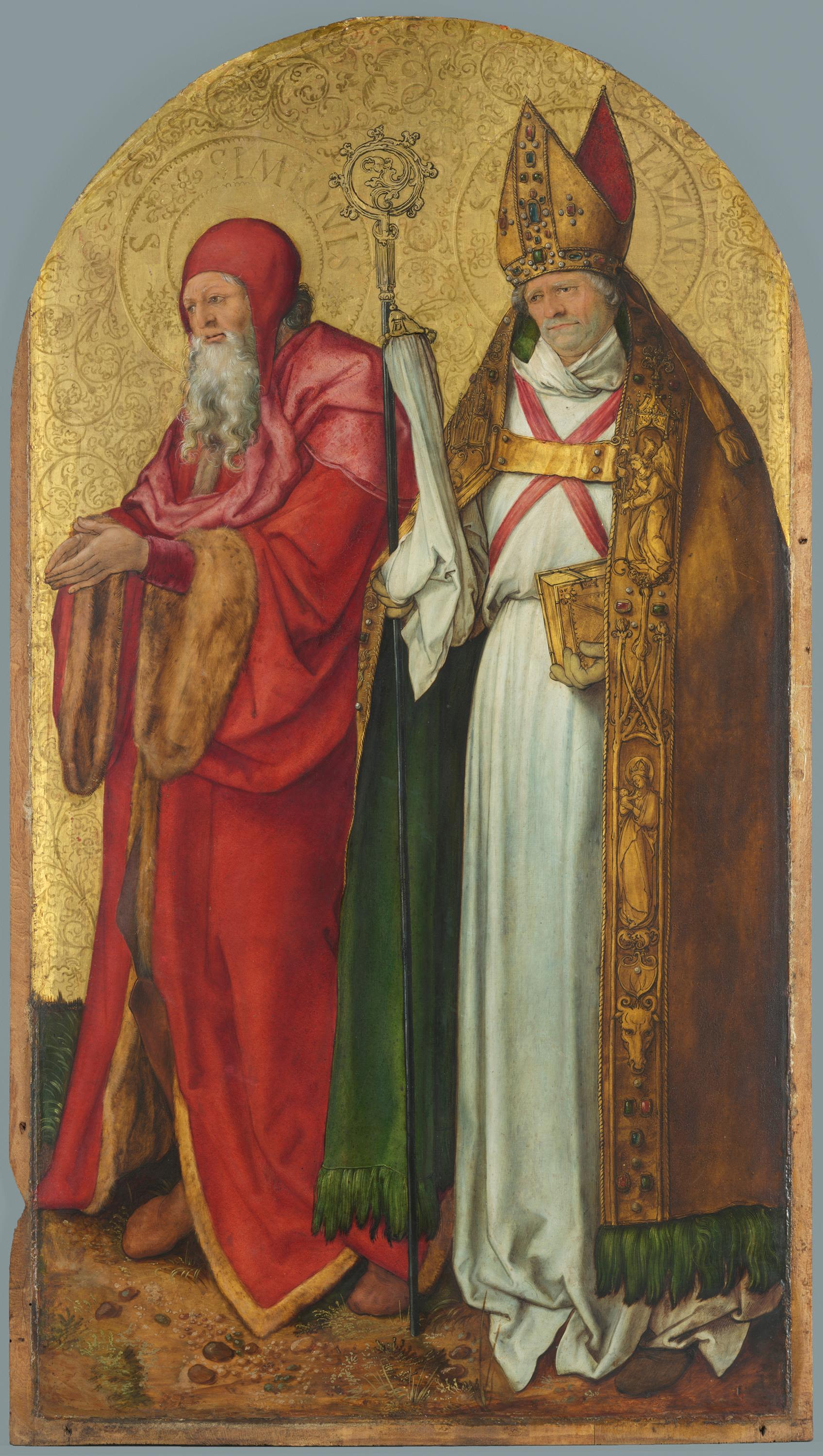
Sts. Simon and Lazarus, Munich (WAF 229)

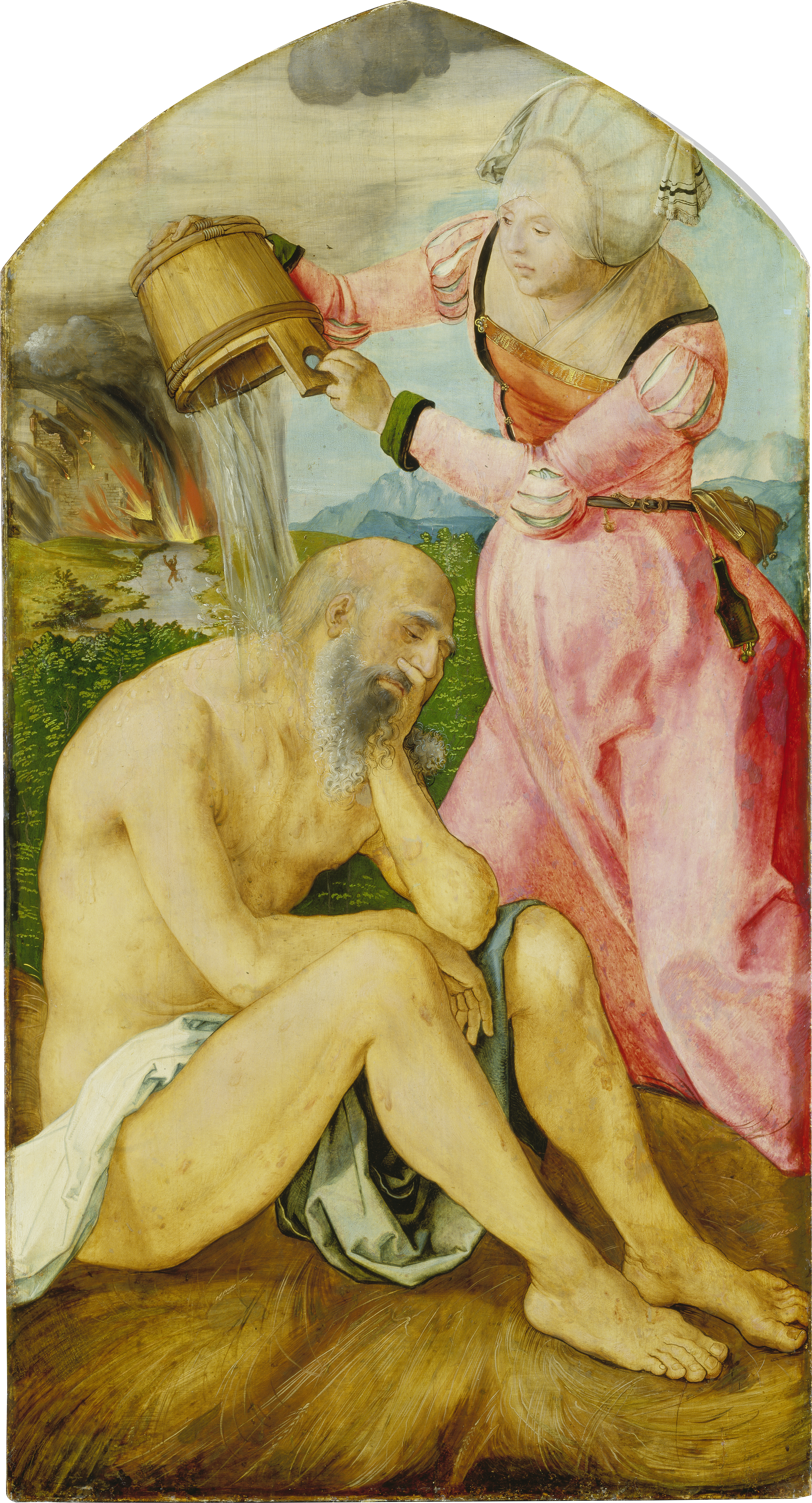
Job on the Dungheap, Frankfurt, Städel (SM 890)

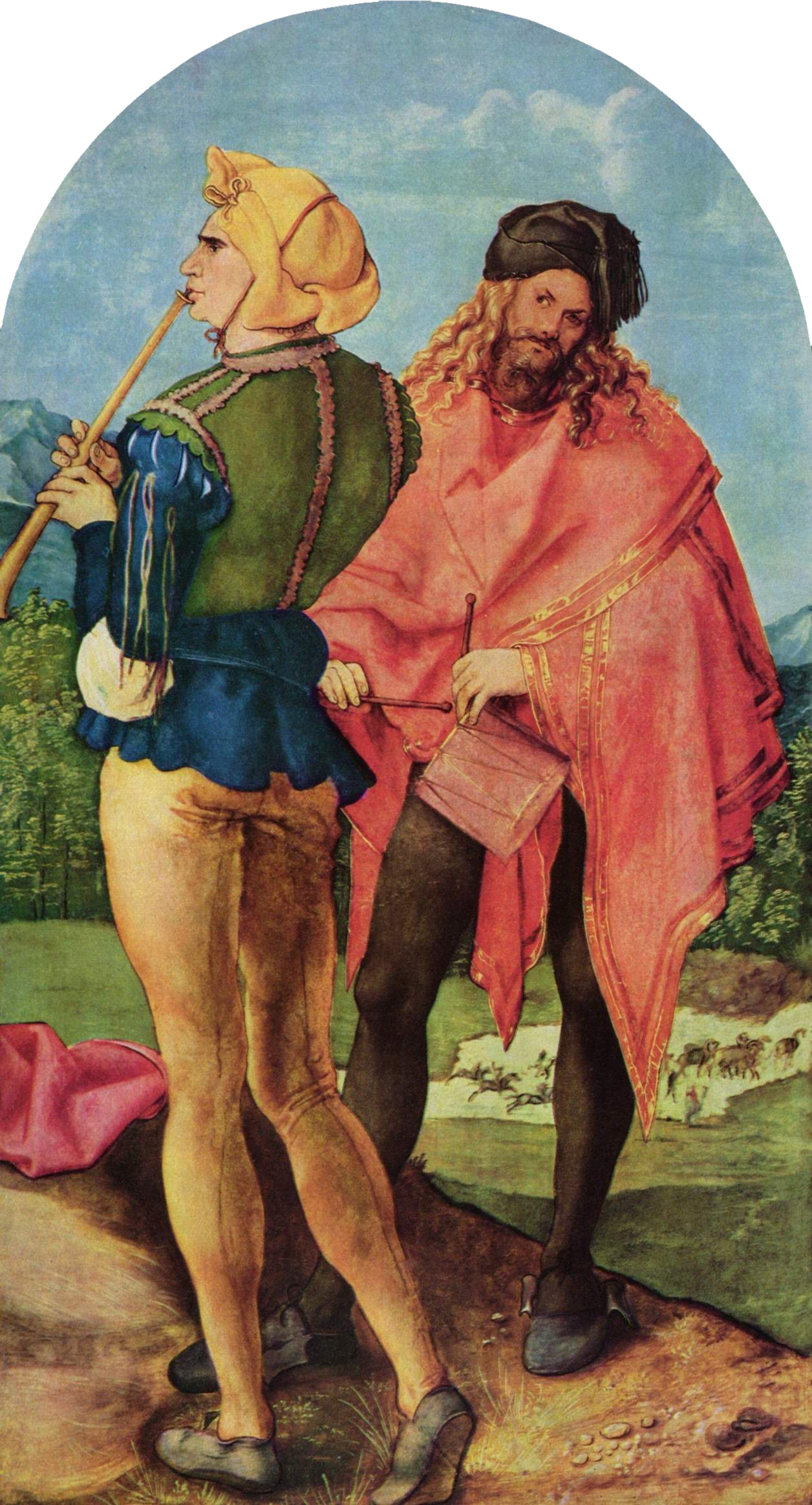
Piper and Drummer, Cologne, Wallraf-Richartz Museum (WRM 0369)

== See also ==
- List of paintings by Albrecht Dürer

== Sources ==
- Costantino Porcu, ed. (2004). Dürer. Milan: Rizzoli.
