= Triptych of the Life of Job =

15th-century Flemish painted altarpiece

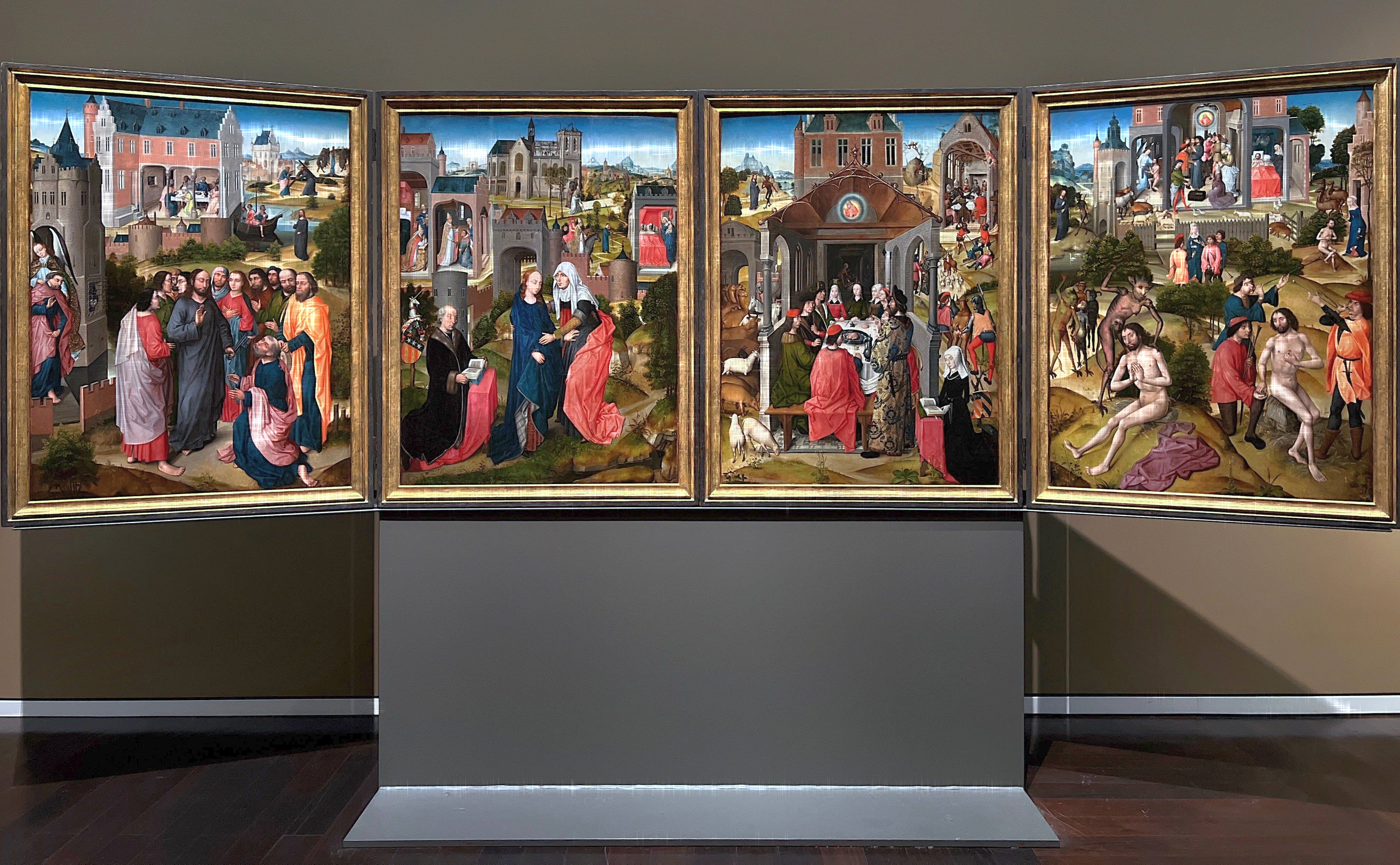
- Triptych of the Life of Job with donors Claudio Villa and Gentina Solaro, Brussels, Brabant, Wallraf-Richartz-Museum, Germany.

Triptych of the Life of Job is a painting by Flemish masters (active 1466–1500 in Brussels) known as the Master of the Legend of Saint Catherine and the Master of the legend of St. Barbara. It depicts scenes from the life of Job in oil paint on four oak panels, 118.5×86 cm and is now at the Wallraf-Richartz-Museum in Cologne. With four pictures it forms a triptych commissioned by prior Claudio Villa, an Italian merchant in the Netherlands, for the chapel of Job in Chieri, Italy, built by his brother Pietro Villa.

Claudio Villa and his wife Gentina Solaro (in a younger version) can also be seen as the donors of an altarpiece.

The National Gallery of Victoria, Australia, have used the work as a comparator in analysis of their own Flemish triptych.

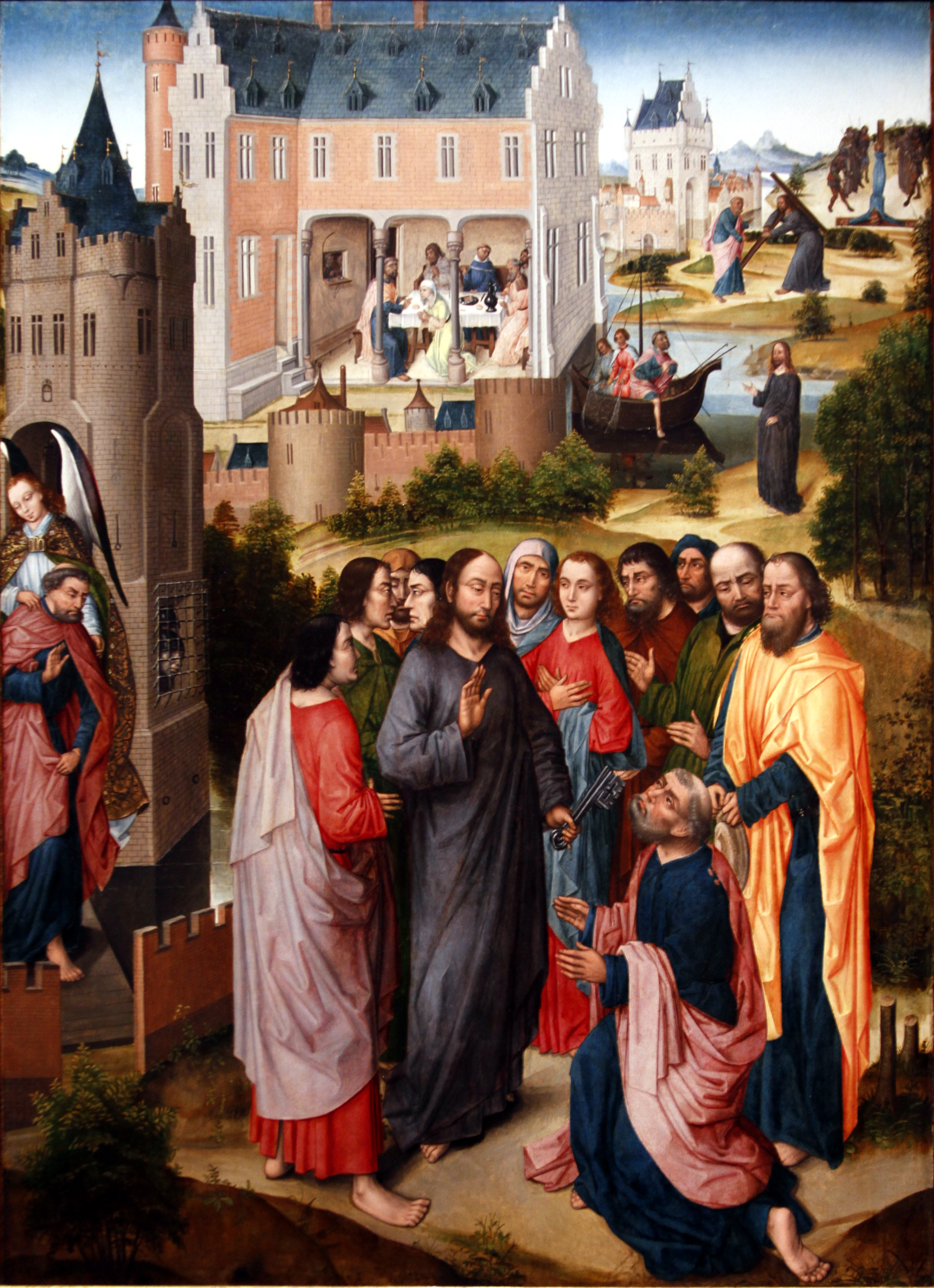

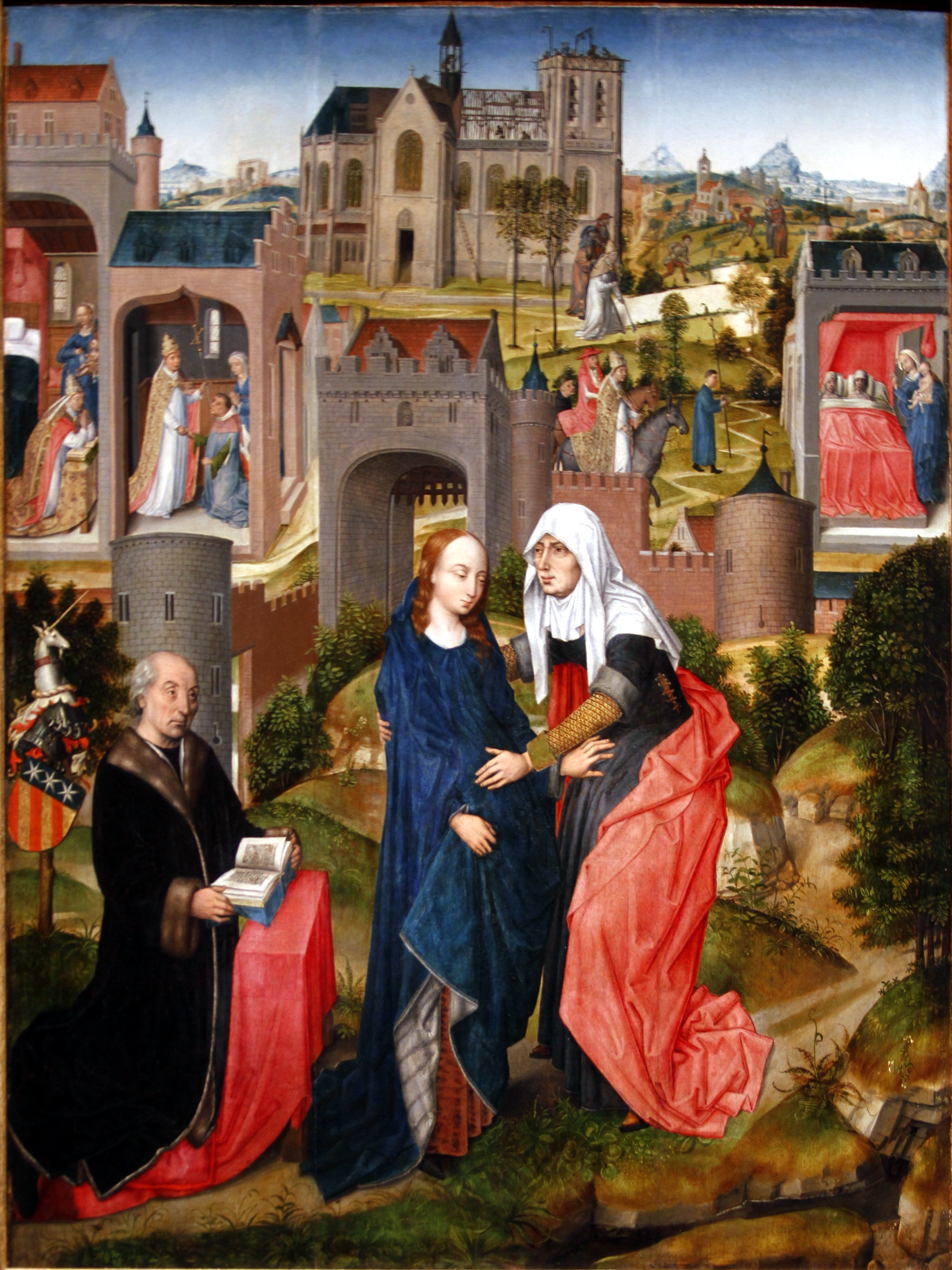

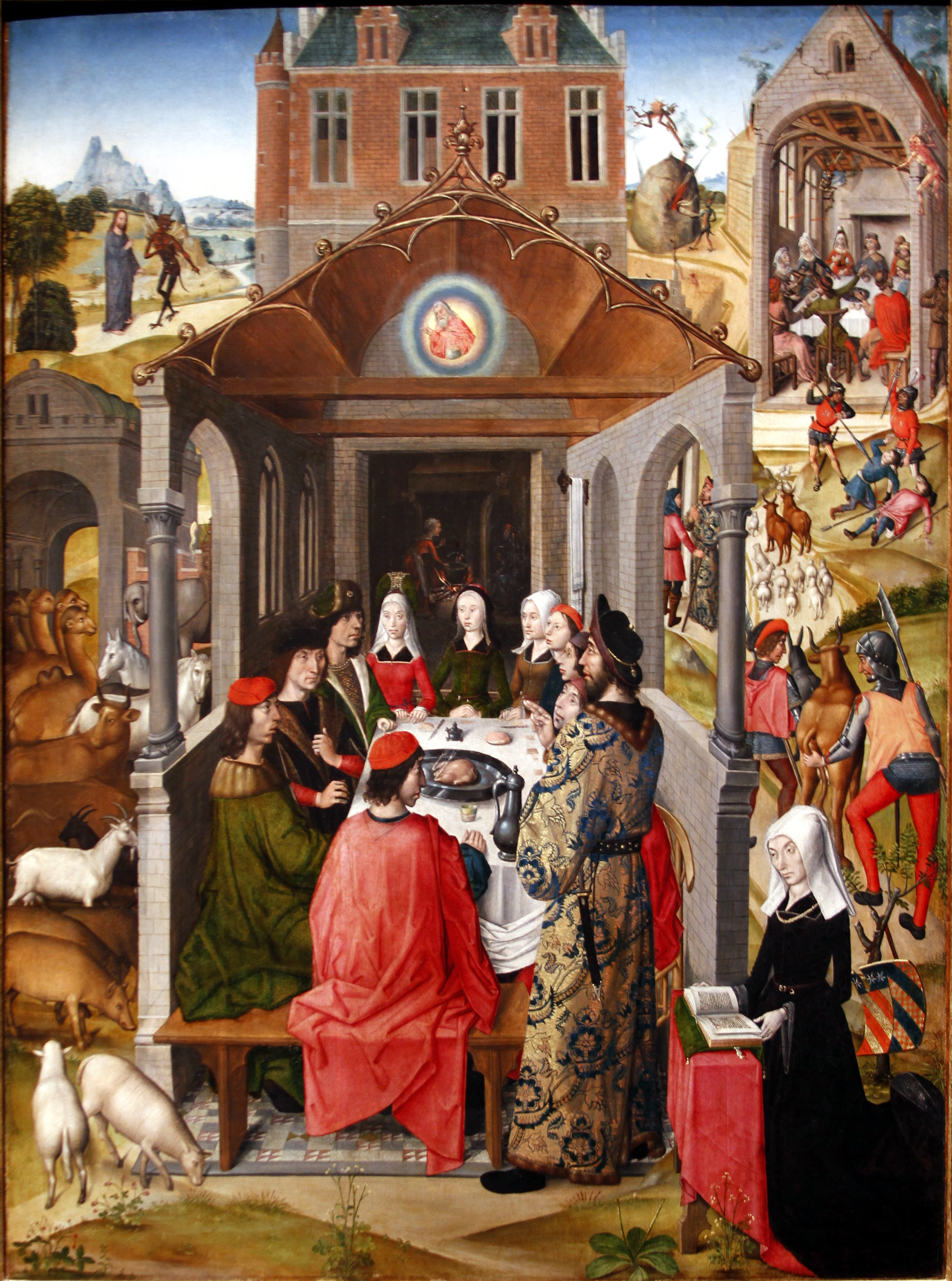

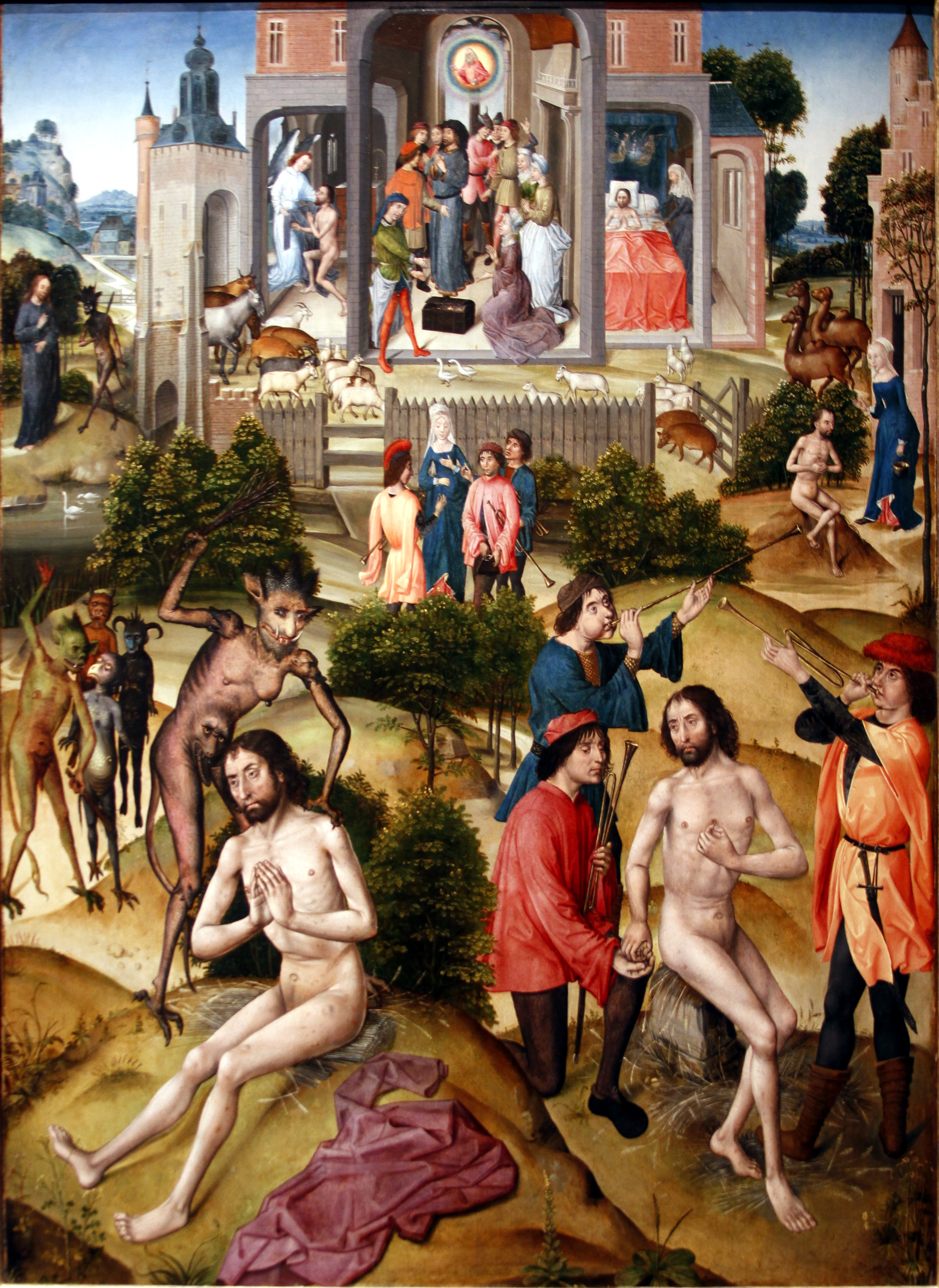
