= Gérard Corboud =

Swiss entrepreneur, art collector, and philanthropist

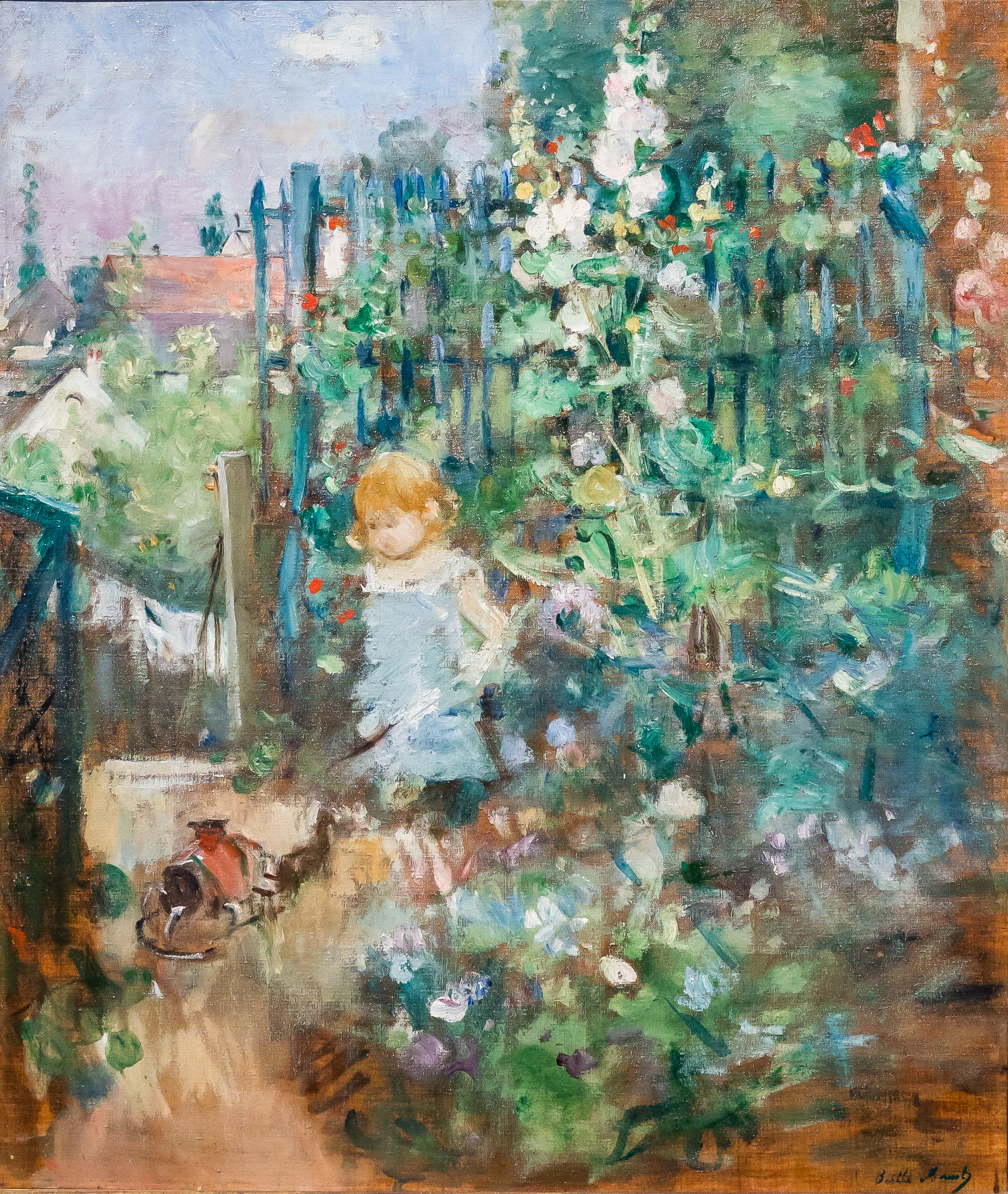
Child among staked roses, by Berthe Morisot, 1881 (now in the Wallraf-Richartz Museum)

Gérard J. Corboud (18 May 1925 – 5 March 2017) was a Swiss entrepreneur, art collector and philanthropist.

From the late-1970s onwards, Corboud and his wife Marisol acquired works by the Impressionists and Post-Impressionists, and later the Neo-Impressionists. In 2001, they made a "permanent loan" of their collection of over 170 works to the Wallraf-Richartz Museum in Cologne, Germany, which was renamed the Wallraf-Richartz-Museum & Fondation Corboud.

Their collection includes works by Auguste Renoir, Claude Monet, Alfred Sisley, Paul Cézanne, Paul Gauguin, and Vincent van Gogh, and is the largest Impressionist collection in Germany.

Corboud died on 5 March 2017.
