= Saint Francis in Ecstasy (Zurbarán) =

Painting by Francisco de Zurbarán in Munich

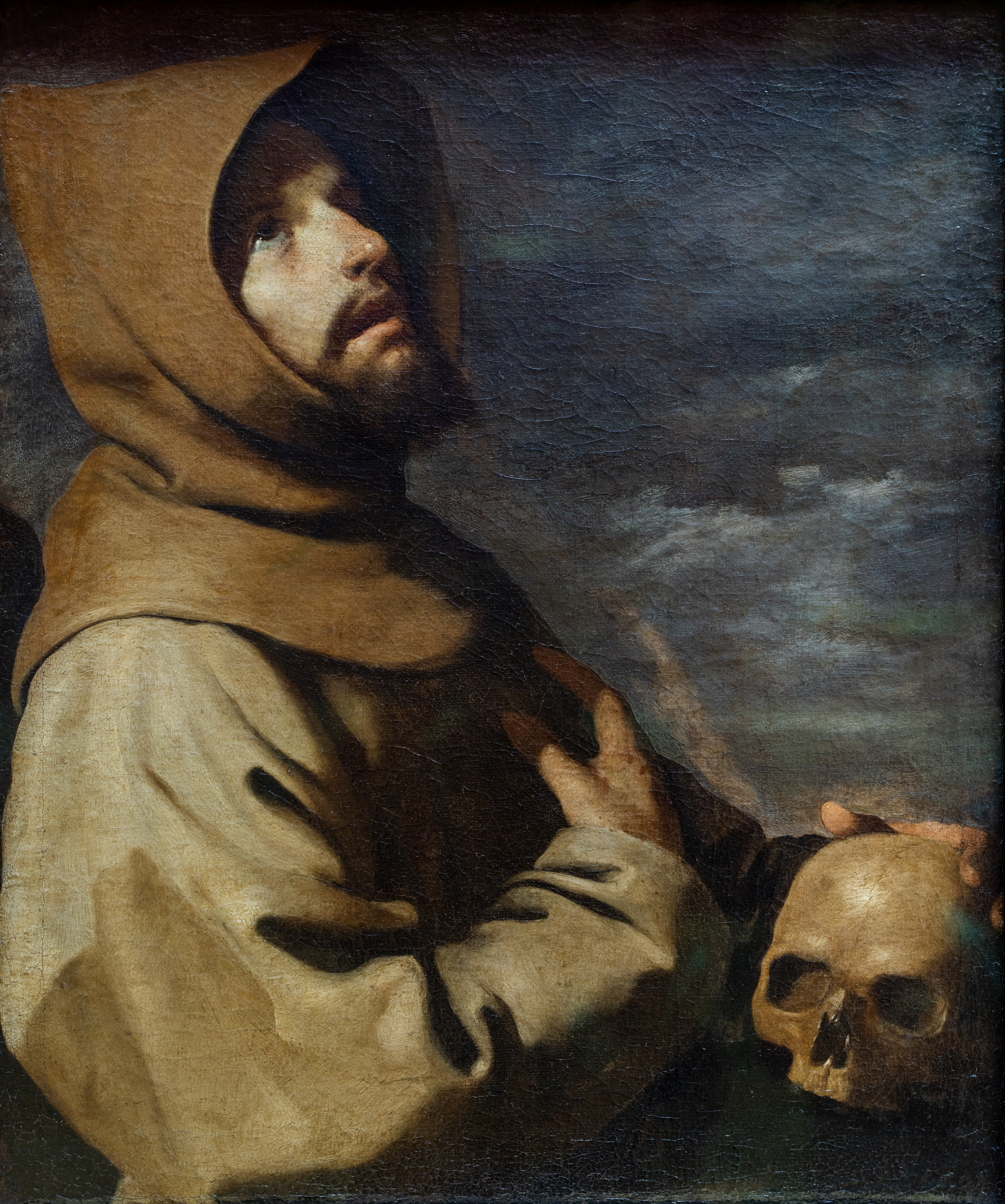
- Artist: Francisco de Zurbarán
- Year: 1658–1660
- Medium: Oil on canvas
- Dimensions: 64 cm × 53 cm (25 in × 21 in)
- Location: Alte Pinakothek, Munich

Saint Francis in Ecstasy is an oil painting on canvas of 1658–1660 by the Spanish painter Francisco de Zurbarán in the Alte Pinakothek in Munich, where it has been since 1836.

It is one of Zurbarán's several paintings of Francis of Assisi, his name saint. It was his second-to-last work on the subject, the last being Saint Francis Praying in His Cave (in a private collection).

When it was bought by Charles Theodore, Elector of Bavaria, in 1756 for his gallery in Mannheim, the work was misattributed to Guido Reni. It was moved to the Hofgartengalerie in Munich in 1799 and its attribution was corrected in 1818 by Johann Georg von Dillis, director of Ludwig I of Bavaria's royal collection.

== See also ==
- Media related to Francis of Assisi by Zurbaran (Alte Pinakothek) at Wikimedia Commons
