= The Small Last Judgement (Rubens) =

1619 painting by Peter Paul Rubens

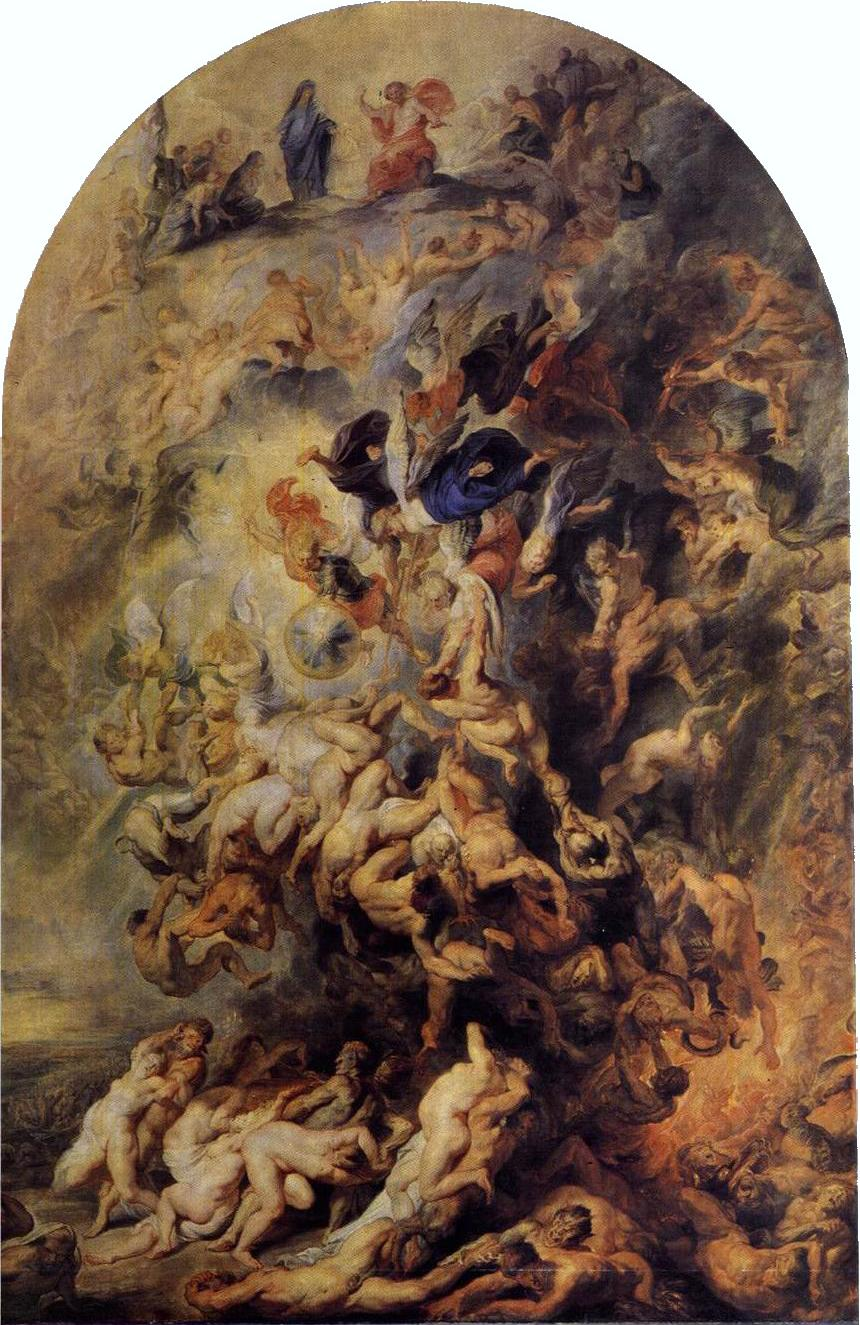
The Small Last Judgement (1619) by Rubens

The Small Last Judgement is a 1619 painting by Peter Paul Rubens. Its name distinguishes it from the same artist's The Great Last Judgement of 1617. It is now in the Alte Pinakothek in Munich.
