= Julius Braun =

German historian (1825–1869)

Julius Braun (16 July 1825 in Karlsruhe – 1869 in Munich) was a German historian, with an interest in art, culture and religion.

== Biography ==
Braun was born in Karlsruhe and received his early education at the city's lyceum. He then studied at the universities of Heidelberg and Berlin, at first theology, but later philology and art history. He finished his formal studies in 1848, and passed the test for teachers in Karlsruhe that same year. From 1850 to 1853, he undertook an extensive study tour which brought him to Egypt, Syria, Asia Minor, Rome, Paris and London.

At first a privatdozent in the University of Heidelberg (1853), he later became a professor at the University of Tübingen for a short period of time (from 1860). However he wished to reach a wider audience and find a more stimulating atmosphere. Thus he finally went to Munich, where he lectured in the Academy of Arts. There he gained a circle of warm friends among the educated, but not the position he hoped for. He busied himself with his writings, and traveled to Rome again briefly. He finally died of a fever.

== Thesis ==
Both in his books and in his lectures he maintained the thesis that the really fundamental principles of art and religion were derived from the Egyptians, and were transmitted, through the Semites, Greeks, and Romans, to the Germanic and other northern peoples.

== Works ==
- Studien und Skizzen aus den Ländern der alten Kultur (“Studies and sketches from the lands of ancient cultures”, 1854).
- Geschichte der Kunst in ihrem Entwicklungsgang durch alle Völker der Alten welt hindurch auf dem Boden der ortskunde nachgewiesen (“History of art in its process of development by all peoples of the ancient world”, etc., 2 volumes, 1856–58, 2nd edition 1873), with Franz von Reber; a projected 3rd volume, involving Etruria and Rome, was never written.
- Naturgeschichte der Sage (“Natural history of legends”, 2 volumes, 1864–65); considered to be his best work,
- Historische Landschaften (“Historical landscapes”, 1867).
- Gemälde der mohammedanischen Welt (“Islamic painting”, 1870).
