= The Great Last Judgement =

Painting by Peter Paul Rubens

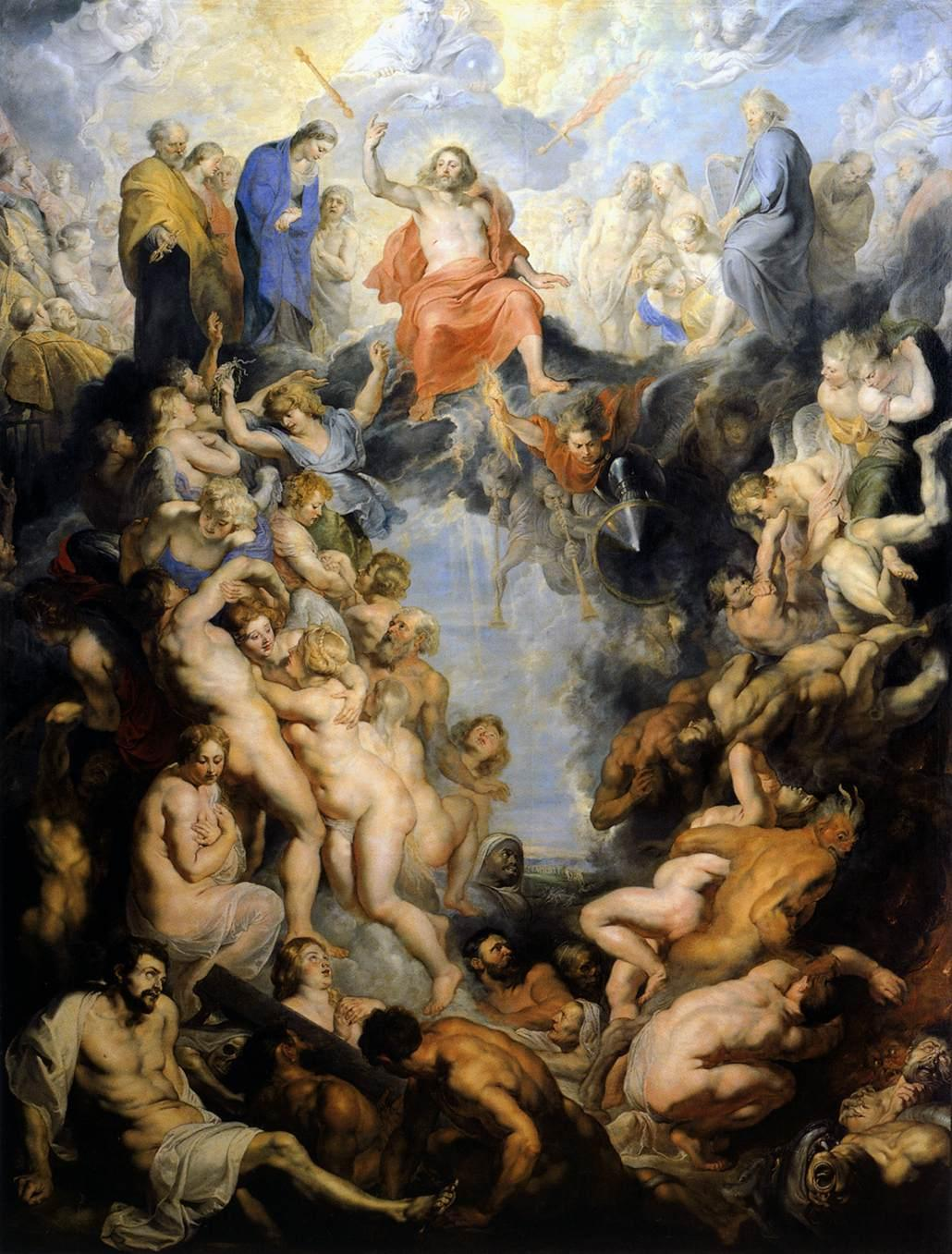
The Great Last Judgement (1614-1617) by Rubens. The canvas measures 6.08 × 4.63 metres

The Great Last Judgement is an oil on canvas altarpiece, painted by the Flemish artist Peter Paul Rubens between 1614 and 1617. He created the composition and final touches and his is the only signature on the work, though it is believed between nine and nineteen studio assistants also worked on it. Its name distinguishes it from the same artist's The Small Last Judgement of 1619 and his The Fall of the Damned of 1620.

It was one of four altarpieces commissioned from Rubens for the Jesuit church at Neuburg an der Donau by Wolfgang William, Count Palatine of Neuburg. It later passed into the private collection of Johann Wilhelm, Elector Palatine and is now in the Alte Pinakothek in Munich.

== Description ==
The painting shows the Last Judgement, with God the Father at the top centre and Jesus just below him. To Jesus' right is his mother the Virgin Mary and to his left is Moses, holding the tablets showing the Ten Commandments. Rising up the left-hand side of the painting (at Jesus' right hand) are the blessed, whilst the damned fall into hell on the right-hand side. At the base of the painting are the dead, dying and those just resurrected.

== History of the painting ==
It is believed that ten to twenty artists worked on the image; however, the only signature on the picture is that of Rubens. The design and final nuances were taken care of by the master.

The picture and two associated side panels were commissioned by Wolfgang Wilhelm von Pfalz-Neuburg and were intended to serve as the altarpiece of the high altar in the court church in Neuburg an der Donau, which was handed over to the Jesuits in 1618 as part of the Counter-Reformation. The colossal nature of the picture and the pictorial program are to be understood against the background of the looming Thirty Years' War and the Counter-Reformation, which was pushed forward with great severity in the Principality of Pfalz-Neuburg. The motif of the Last Judgment was the most popular symbol of Counter-Reformation propaganda, along with that of the falling of the angels by Archangel Michael. However, the painting caused offense because of the depicted naked bodies and was partially covered up until finally the grandson of the donor, Johann Wilhelm, brought it to the Düsseldorf gallery in 1692.

After the Palatinate Elector Karl Theodor succeeded to the Bavarian throne in 1777 and moved his court to Munich, first the Mannheim and Zweibrücker galleries and finally, under his successor Maximilian IV Joseph, the Düsseldorf gallery were transferred to the Bavarian capital in 1805/06. There, the Great Last Judgment was initially housed in the gallery in the courtyard garden arcades. It is now in the Alte Pinakothek and is the largest painting in the museum (inv. no. 890). It is placed centrally in Hall VII on the first floor. This so-called "Rubens Hall", which was designed specifically for the painting with its triumphal arch opposite and referring to the painting, is in turn the largest hall in the museum. The painting is the only one still placed in the same place as when the museum was founded in 1836.

The two side panels showing the adoration of the shepherds and the outpouring of the Holy Spirit are in the Neuburg State Gallery.
