= Madonna of the Carnation =

Painting by Leonardo da Vinci

The Madonna of the Carnation
- Madonna del Garofano (Italian)
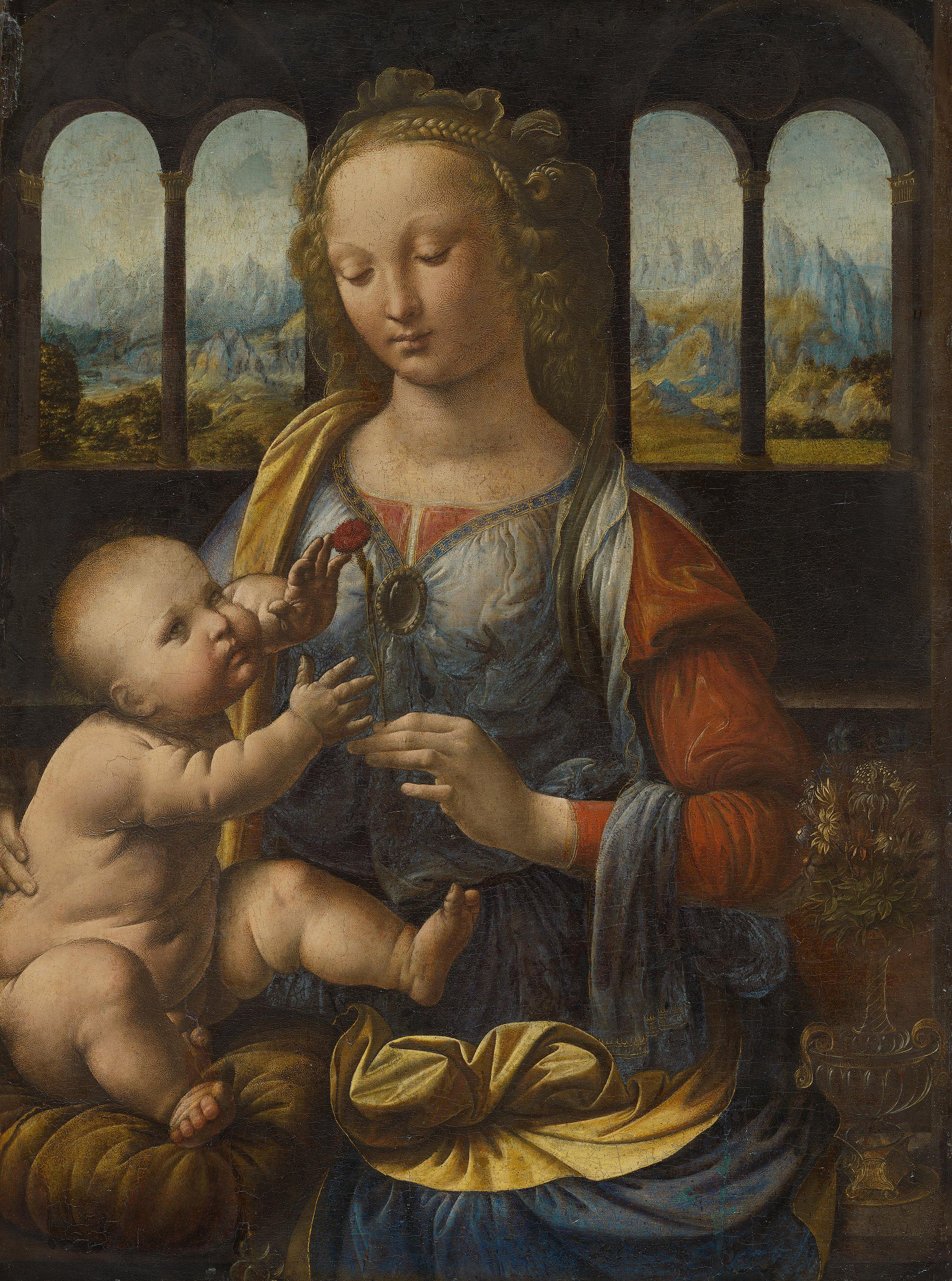
- Artist: Leonardo da Vinci
- Year: 1478–1480
- Medium: Oil on panel
- Dimensions: 62 cm × 47.5 cm (24 in × 18.7 in)
- Location: Alte Pinakothek, Munich

The Madonna of the Carnation, also known as the Madonna with Vase, Madonna with Child or Virgin with Flower, is a Renaissance oil painting by Leonardo da Vinci created around 1478–1480. It is permanently displayed at the Alte Pinakothek gallery in Munich, Germany. (Note: It is the only work by Leonardo permanently on display in Germany.)

The central and centered motif is the young Virgin Mary seated with Baby Jesus on her lap. (Note: A common motif in Christian art during the Middle Ages) Depicted in sumptuous clothes and jewellery, with her left hand Mary holds a carnation (red, suggesting blood and the Passion). The faces are put into light while all other objects are darker, e.g. the flower is covered by a shadow. The child is looking up and the mother looking down, with no eye contact. The setting of the portrait is a room with two windows on each side of the figures.

Originally this painting was thought to have been created by Andrea del Verrocchio, but subsequent art historians agree that it is Leonardo's work, probably made during his apprenticeship to Verrocchio. The Virgin's hair, left hand, the drapery, and flowers are similar to elements of Leonardo's Annunciation.

== See also ==
- List of works by Leonardo da Vinci
