= Alte Pinakothek =

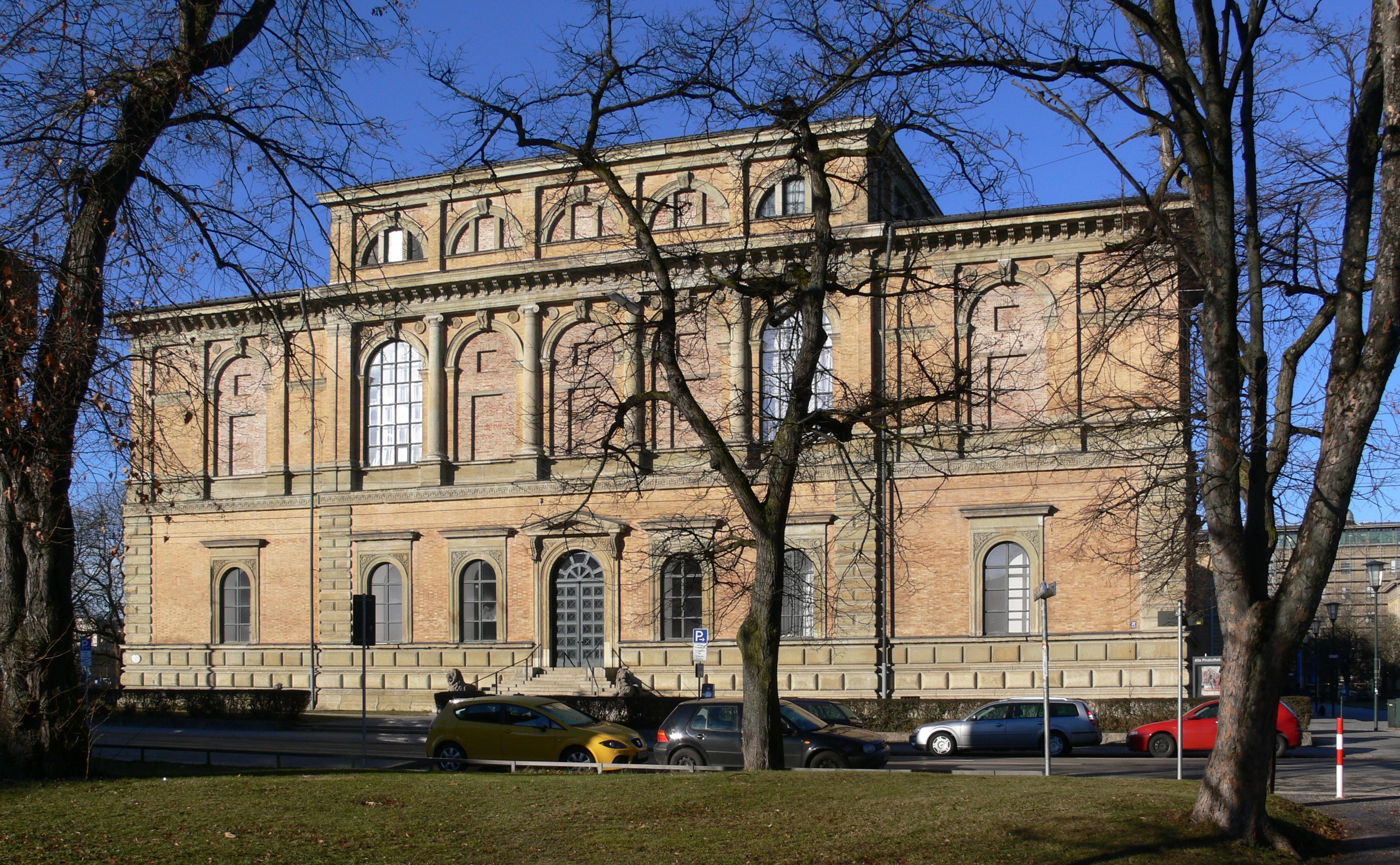
- Alte Pinakothek, eastern façade
- Established: 1836; 190 years ago
- Location: Kunstareal, Munich, Germany
- Coordinates: 48°08′54″N 11°34′12″E
- Type: Art museum
- Accreditation: Bavarian State Painting Collections
- Collections: Old Masters
- Public transit access: No. 27 tram to Pinakotheken; Underground U2 to Königsplatz
- Website: www.pinakothek.de

The Alte Pinakothek (German: [ˈʔaltə pinakoˈteːk], Old Pinakothek) is an art museum located in the Kunstareal area in Munich, Germany. It is one of the oldest galleries in the world and houses a significant collection of Old Master paintings. The name Alte (Old) Pinakothek refers to the time period covered by the collection—from the fourteenth to the eighteenth century. The Neue Pinakothek, re-built in 1981, covers nineteenth-century art, and Pinakothek der Moderne, opened in 2002, exhibits modern art. All three galleries are part of the Bavarian State Painting Collections, an organization of the Free state of Bavaria.

== The building ==
=== History of the building ===
The Alte Pinakothek was the largest museum in the world and structurally and conceptually well advanced through the convenient accommodation of skylights for the cabinets. Even the Neo-Renaissance exterior of the Pinakothek clearly stands out from the castle-like museum type common in the early 19th century. It is closely associated with the function and structure of the building as a museum. Very modern in its day, the building became exemplary for museum buildings in Germany and in Europe after its inauguration in 1836, and thus became a model for new galleries like the Hermitage Museum in Saint Petersburg, and galleries in Rome, Brussels and Kassel.

King Ludwig I of Bavaria ordered Leo von Klenze to erect a new building for the gallery for the Wittelsbach collection in 1826. Georg von Dillis, gallery inspector and close confidant of Ludwig I, influenced the project through conservation requirements and practical experience from museum operations. The construction period lasted from 1826 to 1836.

The Alte Pinakothek is a free-standing solid building measuring 150 meters in length, 50 meters in width, and 25 meters in height. The narrow central building is flanked to the east and west by broader wings. The one-meter-thickmasonry was faced with yellow, polished bricks. Although the south façade was designed as the main façade, the entrance was located on the east side of the building. A gateway on the south side divided the building into two identical halves. After damage to the paintings occurred in 1841 due to the installed air heating system, endless discussions about the preservation of the building, along with insufficient financial means for maintenance, led to a gradual deterioration. The installation of a new heating system in 1891 improved the overall condition of the Alte Pinakothek. At the same time, the gypsum floors were replaced with parquet, and the skylights received new glazing. At the beginning of the 20th century, electric lighting was introduced for the first time, and isolated technical modernizations were carried out.9 During the Nazi era, the building was used for propaganda purposes – including exhibitions that were staged within ideological programs.

The museum building was severely damaged by bombing in World War II: the walls were burnt out, and a 45-meter-wide hole remained in the center. The area in front of the south façade was used as a rubble depot. After long disagreement about the viability of reconstruction, it finally began in 1952 under the direction of Hans Döllgast and was completed in 1957. It was reopened to the public on 7 June 1957, with President Theodor Heuss attending. Director Ernst Buckner oversaw the rebuilding project, ensuring that the building remained true to its original architecture. The ornate, pre-war interior, including the large loggia facing the south façade in the upper floor, was not restored. In the 1990s, the building underwent a fundamental renovation and modernization under the direction of Winfried Nerdinger. Between 1994 and 1998, the climate control system was renewed in particular to meet the conservation requirements of the artworks. At the same time, new exhibition technologies were introduced, while the design of the façades and gallery halls remained unchanged.In 2007, another comprehensive renovation concept was initiated, which included measures for energy efficiency and improvements to the indoor climate. A new wall covering was created in 2008 for the rooms on the upper floor of the Alte Pinakothek with a woven and dyed silk from Lyon. The new color scheme of green and red draws on the design of the rooms dating back to the time of construction of the Alte Pinakothek, and was predominant until the 20th century. Already for King Ludwig I and his architect Leo von Klenze, the use of a wall covering alternately in red and green represented the continuation of a tradition that dates back to the exhibition of the old masters of the late 16th century in many of the major art galleries of Europe (Florence, London, Madrid, St. Petersburg, Paris, Vienna).

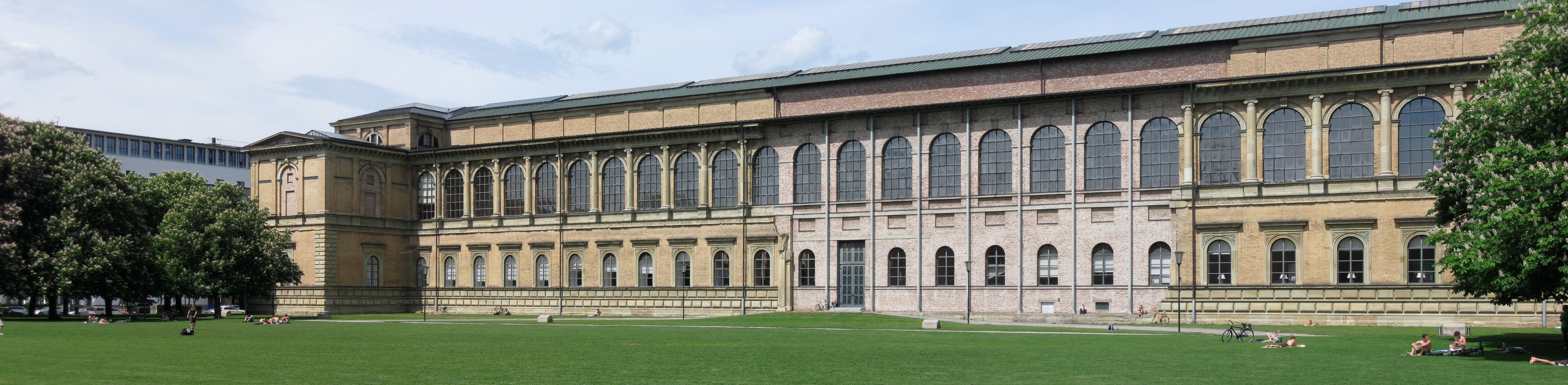
Alte Pinakothek, south façade

=== Restoration Interventions ===
Since the construction of the Alte Pinakothek, changes have been made to the museum building almost continuously. These were particularly aimed at optimizing the indoor climate in order to improve the conditions for the preservation of the artworks. The 190-year history of the Alte Pinakothek is closely linked to the development of preventive conservation.

During the Second World War, the Alte Pinakothek was damaged by multiple attacks: in 1943, the roof and the ceilings of the upper halls were hit by incendiary bombs. In April 1944, the exhibition rooms and staircases completely burned out. The museum building was finally destroyed in December 1944, when an aerial mine tore it open across 45 meters in the middle. In the following years, the ruin suffered further damage from rain, wind, and frost. Looters stole everything of value that had remained after the end of the war. During the clearing work, the Alte Pinakothek eventually became a dumping ground for rubble, which caused further damage to the building itself, as the rubble exerted significant pressure on the remaining outer walls and released moisture. In the following years, various solutions were discussed: demolition and new construction, reconstruction, gutting and preservation as a memorial, and integration into a new building complex. In February 1952, it was finally agreed to preserve the Alte Pinakothek as a cultural monument and to rebuild it under the direction of architect Hans Döllgast. He rejected a reconstruction; the traces of destruction were not to be concealed but left visible. The remaining brickwork was integrated into the reconstruction. Döllgast refrained from smoothing or covering the damage to the masonry and instead made it part of the new architectural language. The damaged central tract was not reconstructed in a historicizing manner but was simplified using rubble bricks that could be integrated into the existing masonry without breaking format. The added masonry stood out visibly from the old masonry, so the addition remained permanently recognizable. The old windows and arches were reshaped with selective use of concrete without any ornamentation. Meander bands and window parapets were also reproduced in simplified concrete forms. The structure of the existing façade was taken up by the originally provisional steel columns, which, in the rebuilt part of the façade, adapted to the rhythm of the Ionic columns. The alignment of the new wall surface was set back by half a brick length from the existing structure. The bricking-up of some windows in the upper floor of the cross buildings resulted from the desire to enlarge the hanging surfaces for paintings. For the roof, initially the most important element to protect the ruin from weather- related decay, Döllgast designed glazed gabled roofs made of wood over the central nave and the cross tracts. The skylight band followed the slope of the roof and could be flexibly adjusted for optimal lighting. The covering of the side aisles with shed roofs expressed the change in orientation. To construct the roof, consoles had to be built at the upper end of the wall to compensate for the outward displacement of the exterior walls caused by the blast pressure of the bombs. Due to changed fire safety regulations, the roof was converted into hipped roofs during the first renovations after Döllgast's reconstruction. Although Hans Döllgast originally envisioned a narrow staircase leaning against the outer wall to preserve the old structure of the loggia, the client wanted a more monumental design: for this, the still-existing arches between the outer and inner wall had to be removed. Instead of vaults, a new concrete ceiling was inserted and the pilasters were extended to the new ceiling. With the new staircase, the circulation and layout of the Alte Pinakothek were completely changed. The main entrance was relocated to the north side, so the access now ran exclusively along the length. This was particularly desirable because the former loggia had usually been closed due to strong light and temperature differences caused by the southern exposure. With the circulation concept, the spatial concept was also adapted: the interior spaces were simplified, restored without original ornamentation, and covered with shallow vaults. While Döllgast envisioned barrel vaults for the interiors, a consulting committee ultimately decided on shallow vaults, in reference to the pre-war period. The Alte Pinakothek was reopened in June 1957, but was not completely rebuilt on the inside until November 1963. Particular attention was paid to the details of the interior design for a long time.

Since 1998, numerous interventions for renovation, adaptation, and preventive conservation have been carried out on the Alte Pinakothek, as unfavorable climatic conditions and electrical deficiencies were identified through monitoring with thermohygrographs. A detailed building physics analysis was subsequently conducted, which served as the basis for all further interventions. In 2008, the fundamental renovation of the roof began. This included measures for thermal insulation, sealing, and the integration of a lightning protection system. At the same time, the skylights were renewed with UV-protective glasses. From 2008 to 2009, the energy optimization of all windows took place in two renovation phases; they were fitted with UV filters and improved thermal insulation. Subsequently, all lighting was converted to LED technology. The fabric-covered dust ceiling glass was replaced with energy-optimized glass and additionally equipped with an integrated shading system. Despite these interventions, active ventilation of the attic remains necessary to counteract summer temperature peaks and prevent substantial damage to the building structure. By 2013, all façades had also been comprehensively cleaned and repointed to prevent moisture-related damage in particular. From 2014 to 2015, the central building services were technically renewed, especially the ventilation systems, which were brought up to the latest standards to meet the conservation requirements for the indoor climate. The interventions were deliberately carried out in stages and while maintaining museum operations. Since July 2018, all exhibition rooms have been fully accessible to the public again.

== History ==
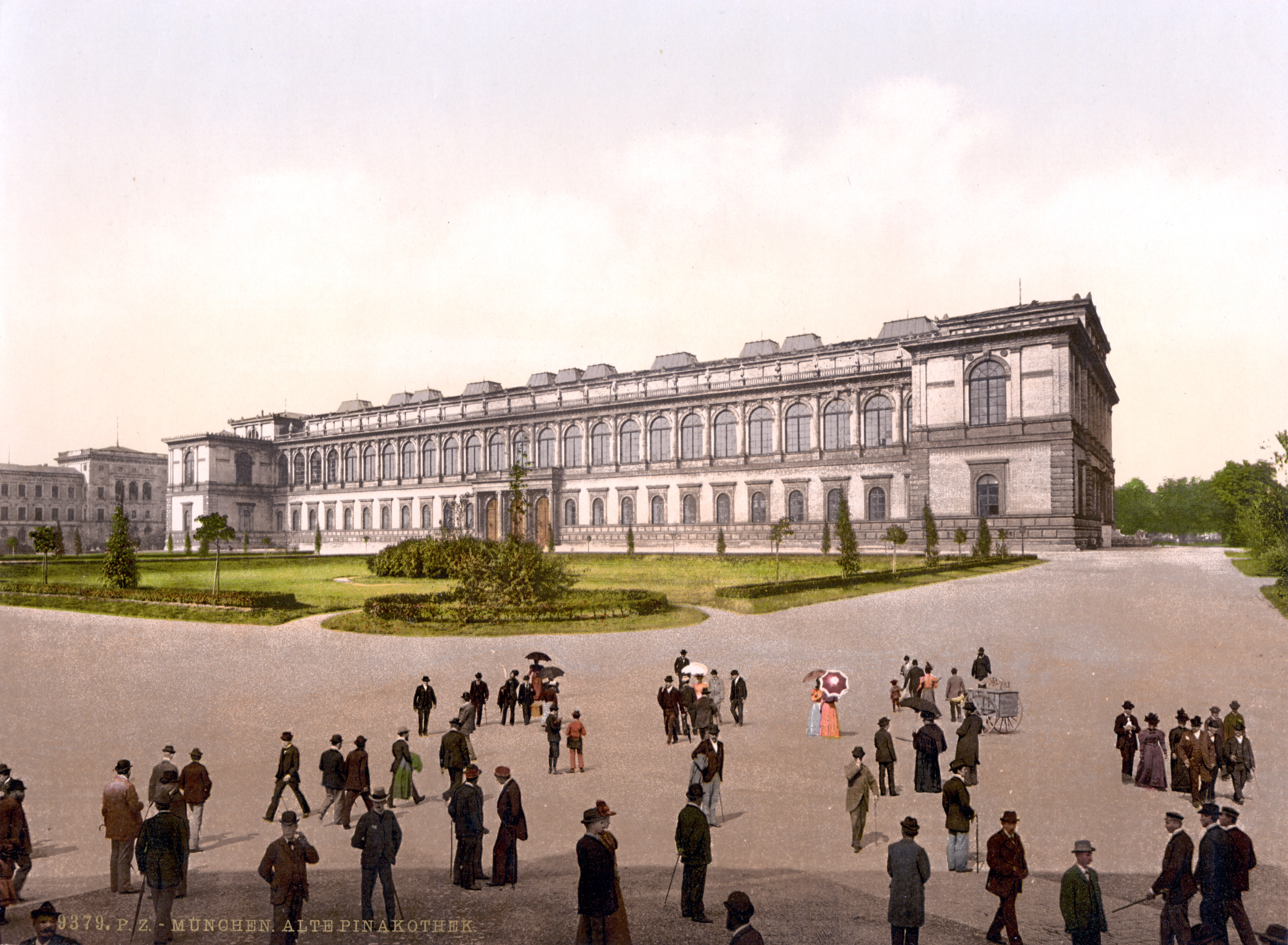
Alte Pinakothek, hand-painted photograph, c. 1890

The Wittelsbach collection was begun by Duke Wilhelm IV (1508–1550) who ordered important contemporary painters to create several history paintings, including The Battle of Alexander at Issus of Albrecht Altdorfer. Elector Maximilian I (1597–1651) commissioned in 1616 four hunt paintings from Peter Paul Rubens and acquired many other paintings, especially the work of Albrecht Dürer. He even obtained The Four Apostles in the year 1627 due to pressure on the Nuremberg city fathers. A few years later however 21 paintings were confiscated and moved to Sweden during the occupation of Munich in the Thirty Years war. Maximilian's grandson Maximilian II Emanuel (1679–1726) purchased a large number of Dutch and Flemish paintings when he was Governor of the Spanish Netherlands. So he bought for example in 1698 in Antwerp from Gisbert van Colen 12 paintings of Peter Paul Rubens and 13 of Van Dyck, with the paintings of Rubens from the personal estate of the artist which were therefore not intended for sale. Under Max Emanuel's successors, the purchases were largely discontinued due to the tight budget.

Also Max Emanuel's cousin Johann Wilhelm, Elector Palatine (1690–1716) collected Netherlandish paintings. He ordered from Peter Paul Rubens The Big Last Judgment and received Raphael's Canigiani Holy Family as a dowry of his wife. Charles Theodore, Elector of Bavaria (1742–1799) had a strong preference for Netherlandish paintings as well, among other paintings he acquired Rembrandt's The Holy Family. By the late 18th century a large number of the paintings were displayed in Schleissheim Palace, and accessible to the public.

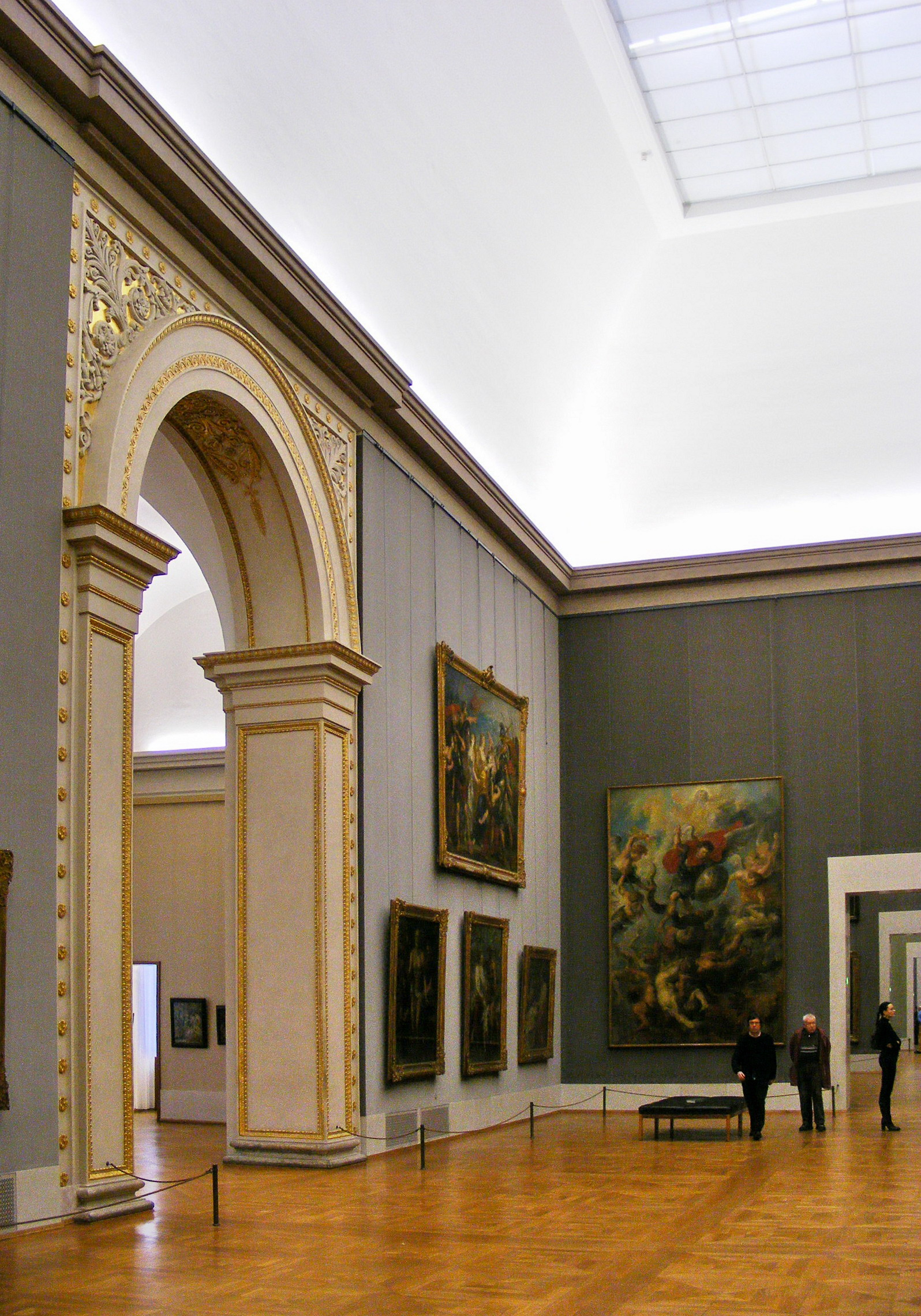
Room IX

After the reunion of Bavaria and the Electorate of the Palatinate in 1777, the galleries of Mannheim, Düsseldorf and Zweibrücken were moved to Munich, in part to protect the collections during the wars which followed the French revolution. Even though 72 paintings including The Battle of Alexander at Issus were taken to Paris in 1800 by the invading armies of Napoleon I (1769–1821), who was a noted admirer of Alexander the Great. The Louvre held it until 1804, when Napoleon declared himself Emperor of France and took it for his own use. When the Prussians captured the Château de Saint-Cloud in 1814 as part of the War of the Sixth Coalition, they supposedly found the painting hanging in Napoleon's bathroom. Most of the paintings have not been returned.

With the secularisation many paintings from churches and former monasteries entered into state hands. King Ludwig I of Bavaria collected especially Early German and Early Dutch paintings but also masterpieces of the Italian renaissance. In 1827 he acquired the collection Boisserée with 216 Old German and Old Dutch masters; in 1828, the king managed to also purchase the collection of the Prince Wallerstein, with 219 Upper German and Upper Swabian paintings. In 1838 Johann Georg von Dillis issued the first catalogue.

After the times of King Ludwig I the acquisitions almost ended. Only from 1875 the directors Franz von Reber and Hugo von Tschudi secured important new acquisitions, such as the Madonna of the Carnation of Leonardo da Vinci and The Disrobing of Christ of El Greco.

The predilection of the Wittelsbach rulers for some painters made the collection quite strong in those areas but neglected others. Since the 1960s the Pinakothek has filled some of these gaps: for example, a deficit of 18th-century paintings was addressed by the integration into the collection of works loaned from two Bavarian banks. Among these paintings were Nicolas Lancret's The Bird Cage and François Boucher's Madame Pompadour.

In April 1988, the serial vandal Hans-Joachim Bohlmann splashed acid on three paintings by Albrecht Dürer, namely Lamentation for Christ, Paumgartner Altar and Mater Dolarosa inflicting damage estimated at 35 million euros. In 1990 Dierick Bouts' Ecce agnus dei was acquired.

On 5 August 2014, the museum rejected a request by a descendant of the banker Carl Hagen for the repatriation of Jacob Ochtervelt's Das Zitronenscheibchen (The Lemon Slice) on the grounds that it had been unlawfully acquired as a result of Nazi persecution. An investigation by the museum established that it had been lawfully purchased at the time for a fair price and that the Hagen family's interest extended only to a security on the painting.

== Collection ==
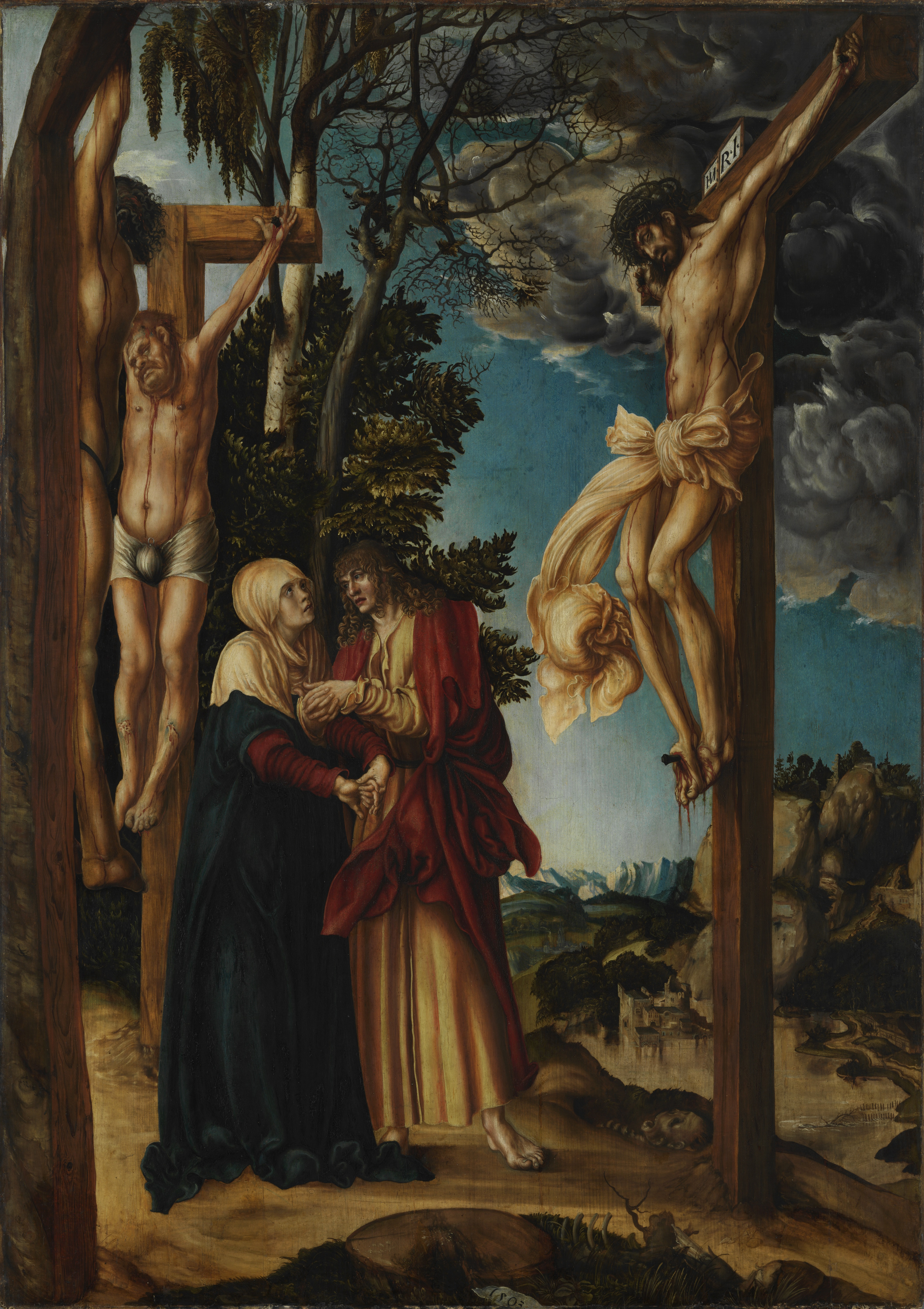
Kreuzigung Christi (English: Crucifixion of Christ) by Lucas Cranach the Elder

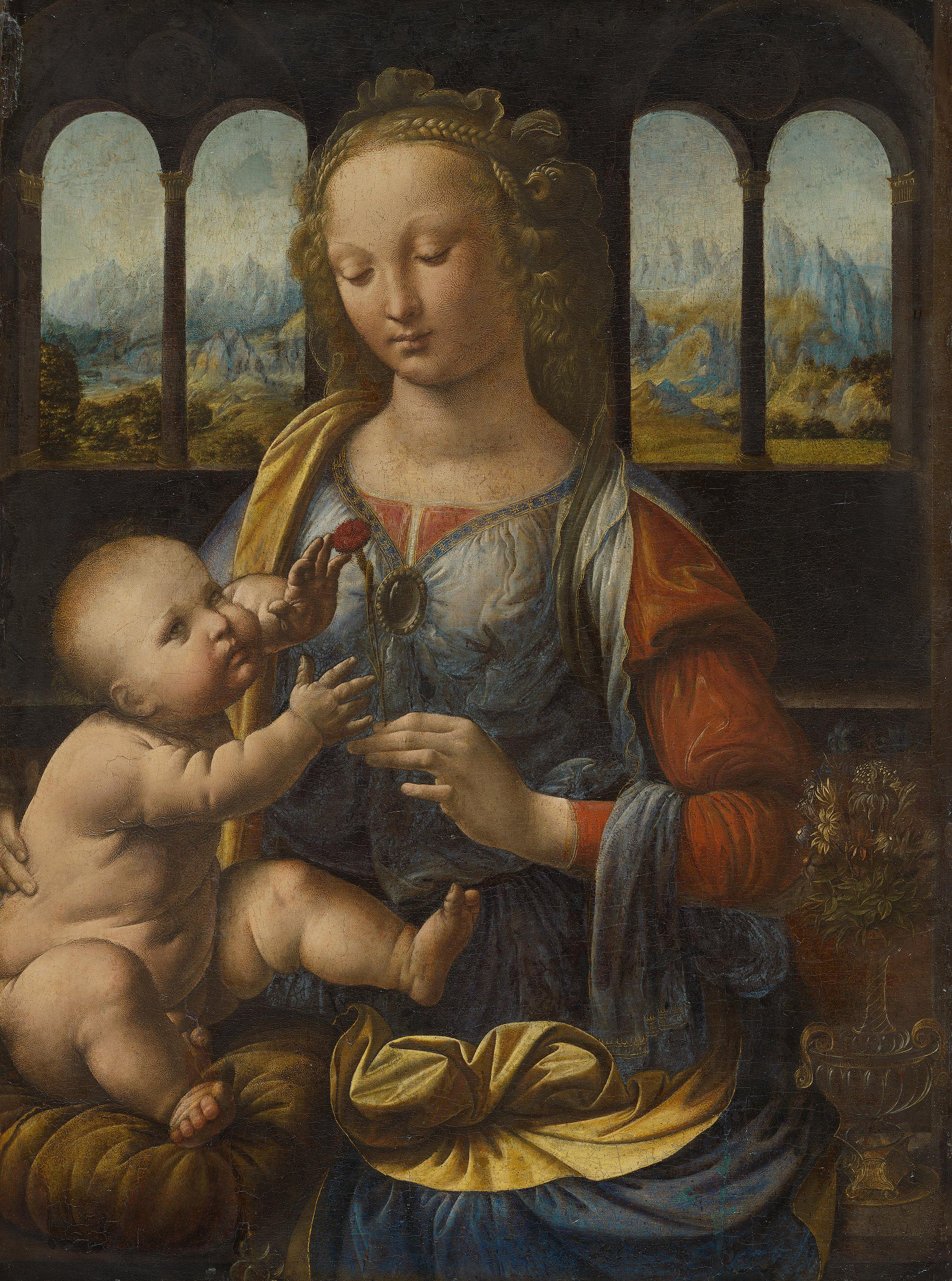
Leonardo da Vinci's Virgin and Child (Madonna of the Carnation)

The museum is under the supervision of the Bavarian State Painting Collections which also owns an expanded collection of several thousand European paintings from the 13th to 18th centuries. Especially its collection of Early Italian, Old German, Old Dutch and Flemish paintings is one of the most important in the world.

More than 800 of these paintings are exhibited at the Old Pinakothek. Due to limited space in the building, some associated galleries throughout Bavaria such as the baroque galleries in Schleissheim Palace and Neuburg Palace additionally have works by the Old Masters on display. From 2014 through 2017, wings of the museum were sequentially closed for renovation, and the artworks in closed sections were unavailable for viewing.

- German paintings 14th–17th century:

The Alte Pinakothek comes with the most comprehensive collection of German Old Masters worldwide. Among many others, the Pinakothek shows works of Stefan Lochner (Adoration of the Christ Child by the Virgin (The Nativity)), Michael Pacher (Altarpiece of the Church Fathers), Martin Schongauer (Holy Family), Albrecht Dürer (The Four Apostles, Paumgartner Altar, Self-Portrait), Hans Baldung Grien (Margrave Christoph of Baden), Albrecht Altdorfer (The Battle of Issus), Cranach (Lamentation Beneath the Cross), Holbein (St. Sebastian Altar; Central panel: Martyrdom of St. Sebastian), Matthias Grünewald (SS. Erasmus und Maurice), Hans von Aachen (The Triumph of Truth), Adam Elsheimer (The Flight into Egypt), and Johann Liss (Death of Cleopatra).

- Early Netherlandish paintings 15th–16th century:

One of the most impressive collections worldwide especially for Early Netherlandish paintings with masterpieces like Vera Icon (van Eyck) and other exceptional paintings for example of Rogier van der Weyden (Saint Columba altarpiece), Dieric Bouts (Ecce Agnus Dei), Lucas van Leyden (Virgin and Child with Mary Magdalen and a Donor), Hieronymus Bosch (Fragment from the Last Judgment), Hans Memling (The Seven Joys of the Virgin), and Jan Gossaert, aka. Mabuse (Danae).

- Dutch paintings 17th–18th century:

Due to the passion of the Wittelsbach rulers this section contains numerous exquisite paintings. Among the masters are Rembrandt van Rijn (The Descent from the Cross, The Holy Family), Frans Hals (Portrait of Willem Croes), Pieter Lastman (Odysseus and Nausikaa), Carel Fabritius (Self-Portrait), Gerard Terborch (The Flea-Catcher (Boy with His Dog)), Jacob van Ruisdael (Torrent with Oak Trees) and many others.

- Flemish paintings 16th–18th century:

The collection contains masterpieces of painters like Jan Mabuse (Danae), Pieter Brueghel the Elder (Harbour Scene with Christ Preaching, The Land of Cockaigne), Jan Brueghel the Elder (Harbour Scene with Christ Preaching), Peter Paul Rubens (Rubens and Isabella Brant in the Honeysuckle Bower, The Fall of the Damned, The Great Last Judgement), van Dyck (Deposition, Self-Portrait, Susanna and the Elders), Jacob Jordaens (Satyr with Peasants) and Adriaen Brouwer (Village Barbar's Shop).

The Rubens Collection, with 72 paintings, is the largest permanent collection of his work worldwide.

- Italian paintings 13th–18th century:

The Italian Gothic paintings are the oldest of the gallery, among them Giotto's famous The Last Supper, then all Schools of Italian Renaissance and Baroque Painting are represented with works of Fra Angelico (Entombment of Christ), Domenico Ghirlandaio (Virgin and Child with SS. Dominici, Michael, John the Baptist and John the Evangelist), Sandro Botticelli (Lamentation over the Dead Christ), Fra Filippo Lippi (The Annunciation), Lorenzo Lotto (The Mystic Marriage of St. Catherine), Raphael (The Canigiani Holy Family, Madonna della tenda, Madonna Tempi), Leonardo da Vinci (Madonna of the Carnation), Antonello da Messina (Annunciata), Titian (Vanity, Charles V), Tintoretto (Christ in the House of Mary and Martha), Paolo Veronese (Amor with two dogs), Guido Reni (The Assumption of the Virgin), Luca Giordano (A Cynical Philosopher), Tiepolo (The Adoration of the Kings), Francesco Guardi (Regatta on the Canale della Guidecca), Canaletto (Piazetta in Venice) and others.

- French paintings 16th–18th century:

In spite of the close relationship of the Wittelsbachs to France it is the second smallest section with works, for example, of Claude Lorrain (The Expulsion of Hagar), Nicolas Poussin (Midas and Bacchus), François Boucher (Madame de Pompadour, Reclining Girl), Nicolas Lancret (The Bird Cage), Jean-Baptiste-Siméon Chardin (Woman Cleaning Turnips), Maurice-Quentin de la Tour (Mademoiselle Ferrand Meditating on Newton), Claude Joseph Vernet (Eastern Harbour at Dawn) and Jean-Honoré Fragonard (Girl with Dog).

- Spanish paintings, 16th–18th century:

Though this is the smallest section, all major masters are represented, such as El Greco (The Disrobing of Christ), de la Cruz (Infant Isabella Clara Eugenia of Spain), Velázquez (Young Spanish Gentleman), Jusepe de Ribera (Saint Bartholomew), Francisco de Zurbarán (The Entombment of St. Catharine of Alexandria on Mount Sinai, St. Francis in Ecstasy), and Murillo (Beggar Boys Eating Grapes and Melon). The paintings of Francisco de Goya were moved into the New Pinakothek.

== Gallery ==
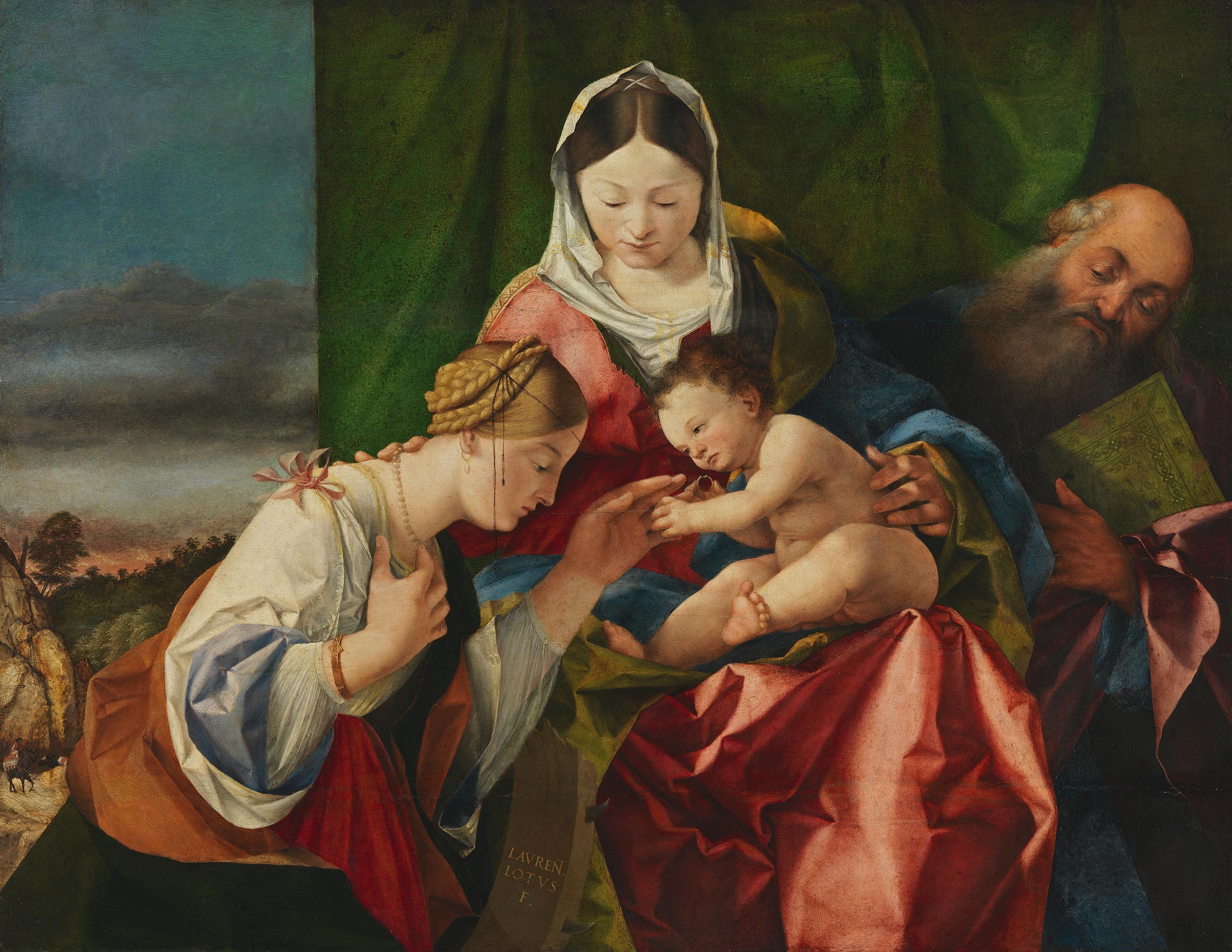
Lorenzo Lotto, Mystic Marriage of Saint Catherine, 1506–08

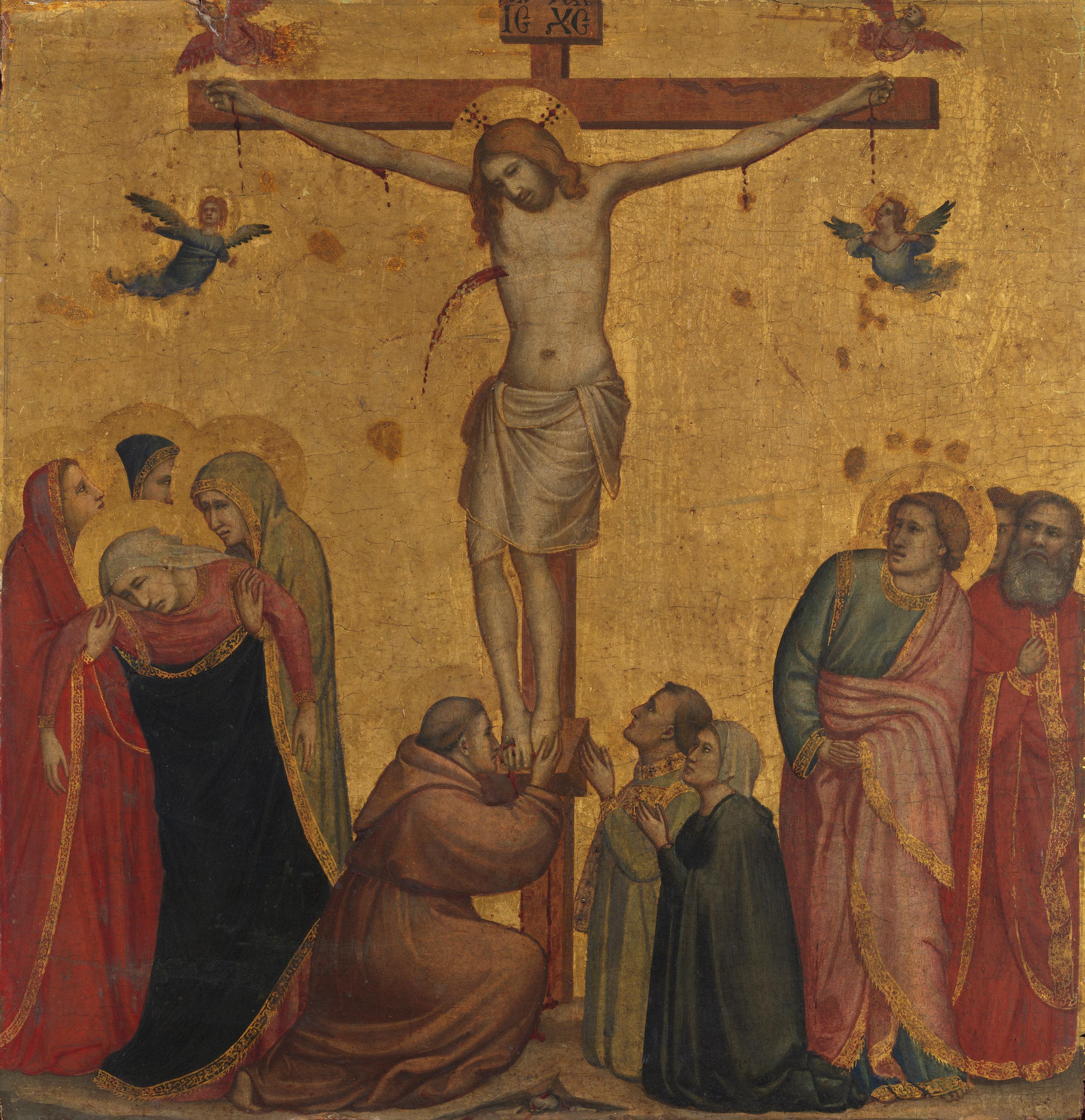
Giotto di Bondone, Christ on the Cross Between Mary and John, c. 1300

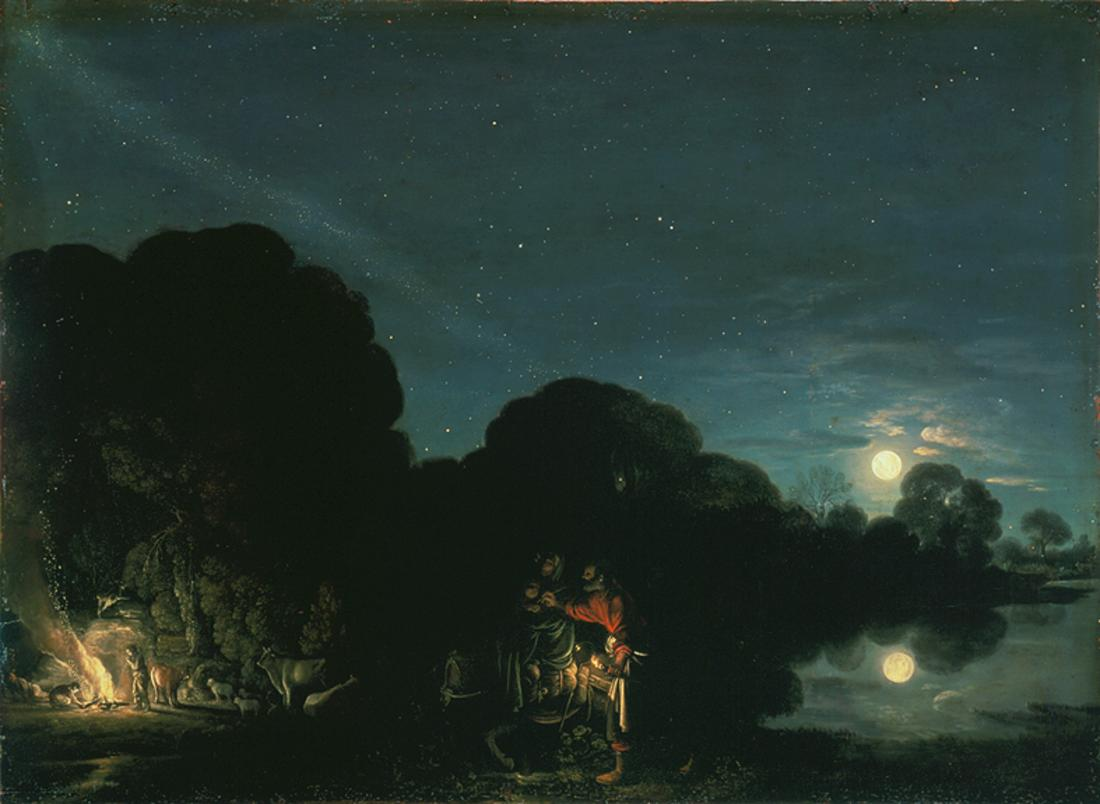
Adam Elsheimer, The Flight into Egypt, c. 1609

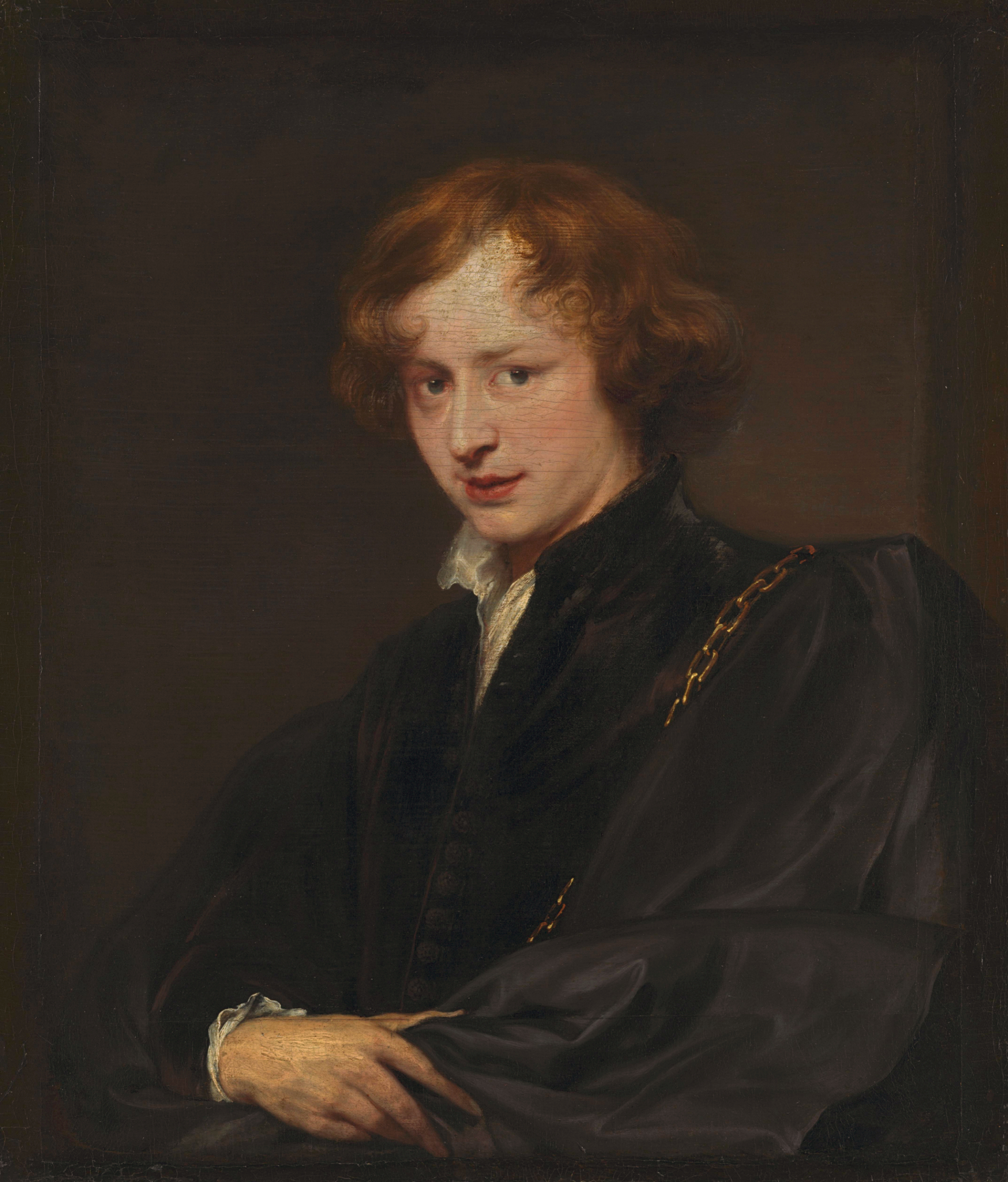
Anthony van Dyck, Self Portrait, c. 1621

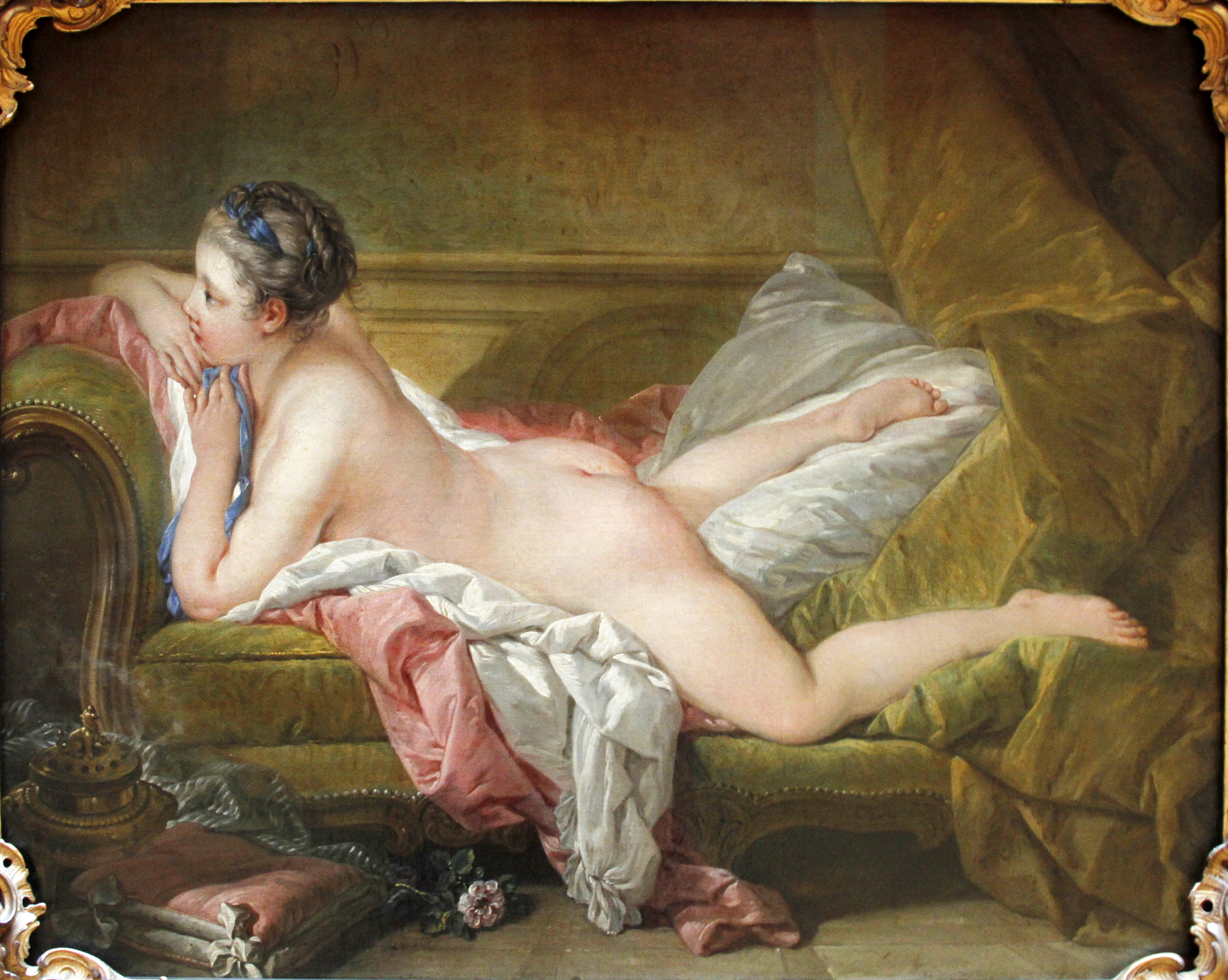
François Boucher, Reclining girl (Marie-Louise O'Murphy, 1737–1818)

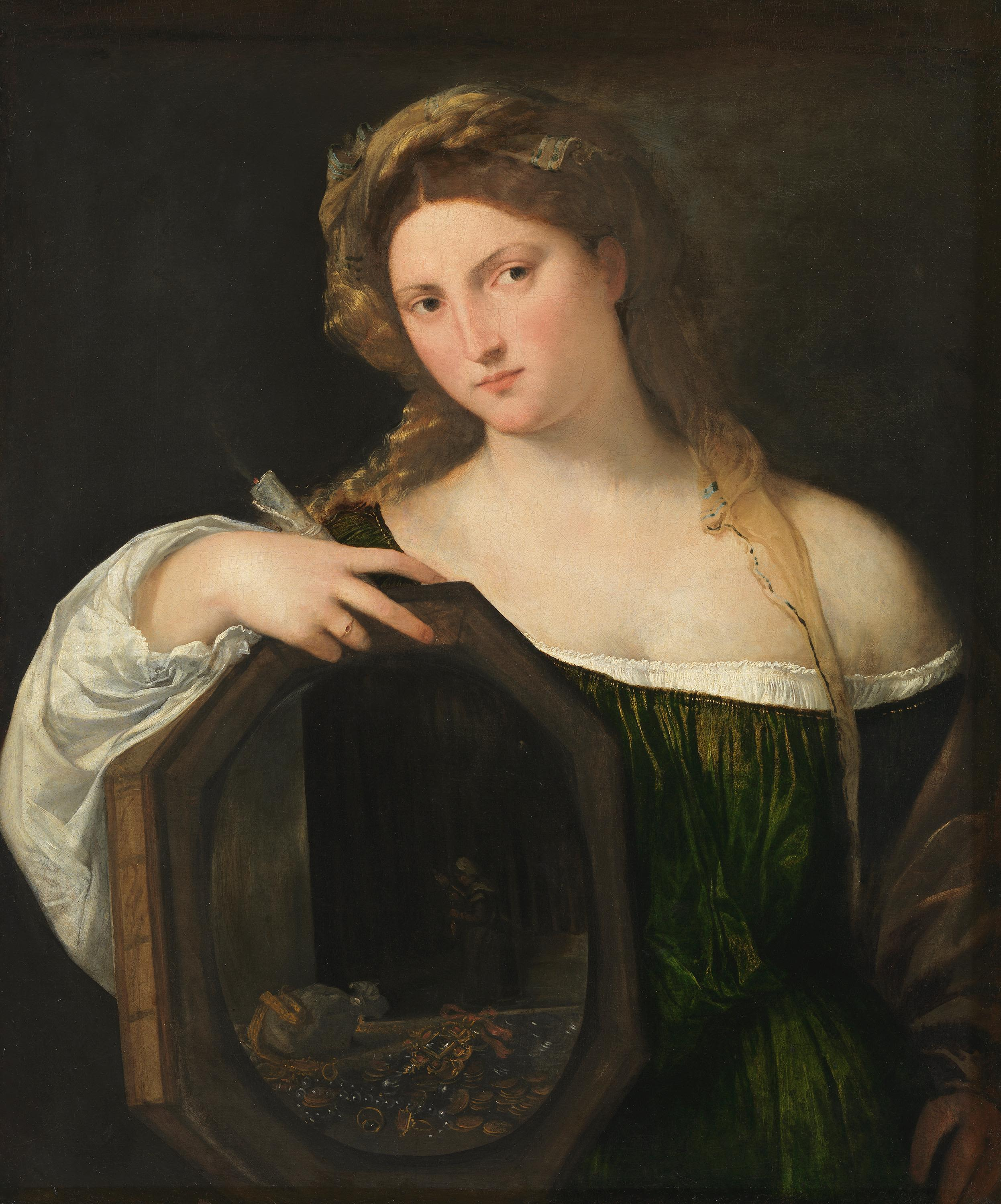
Titian, Vanity, c. 1516

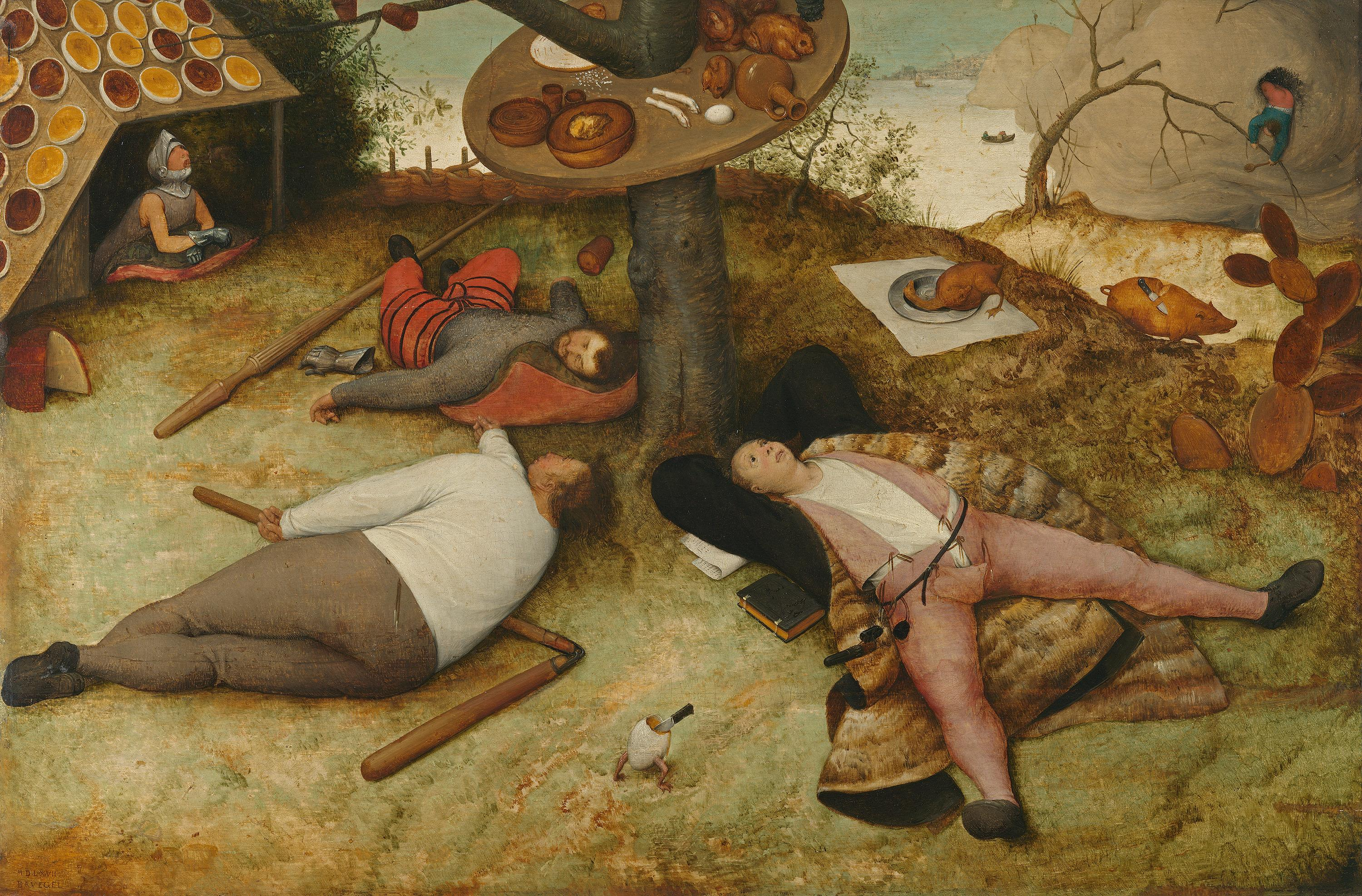
Pieter Bruegel, The Land of Cockaigne, 1567
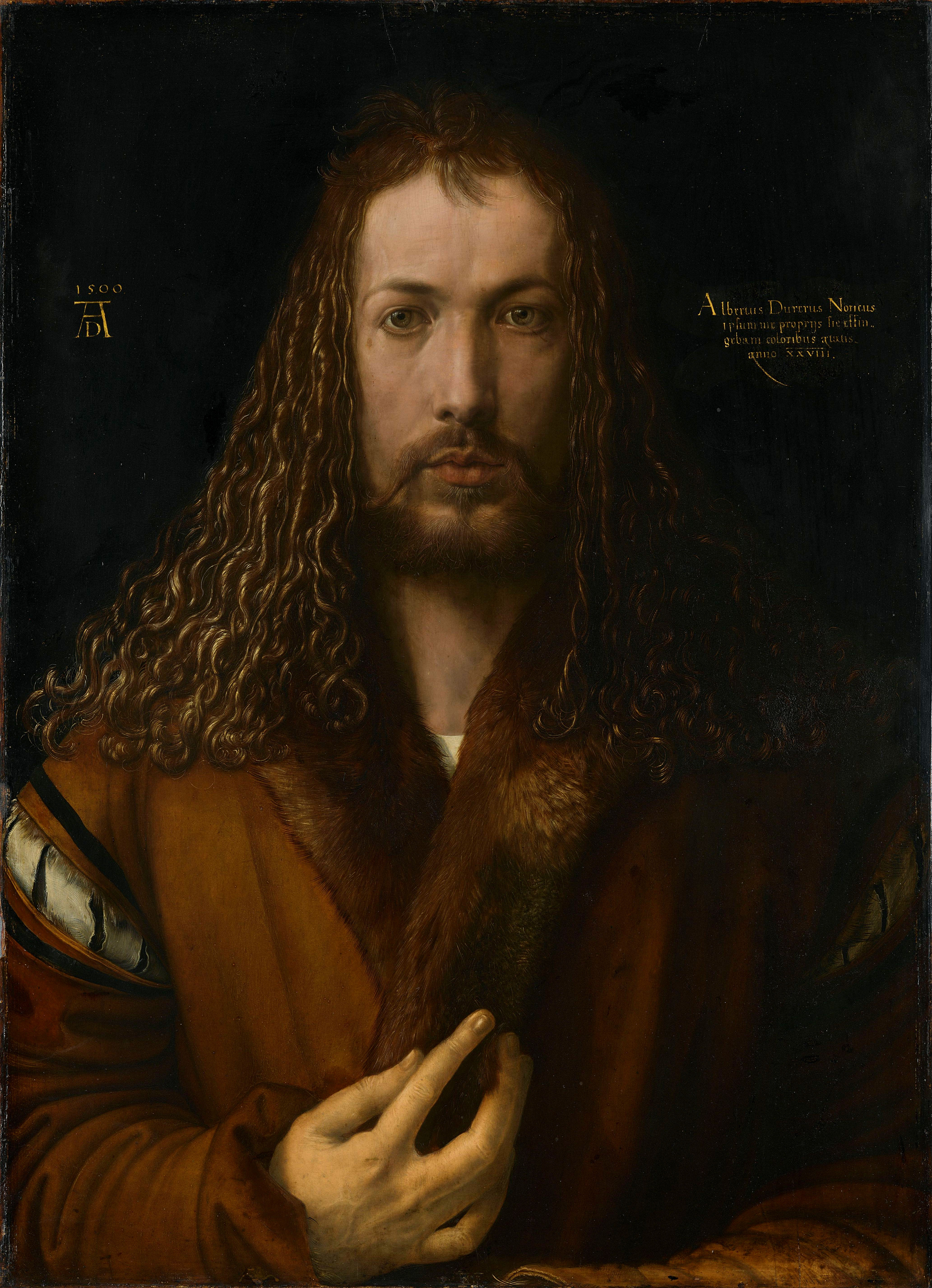
Albrecht Dürer, Self-portrait, 1500

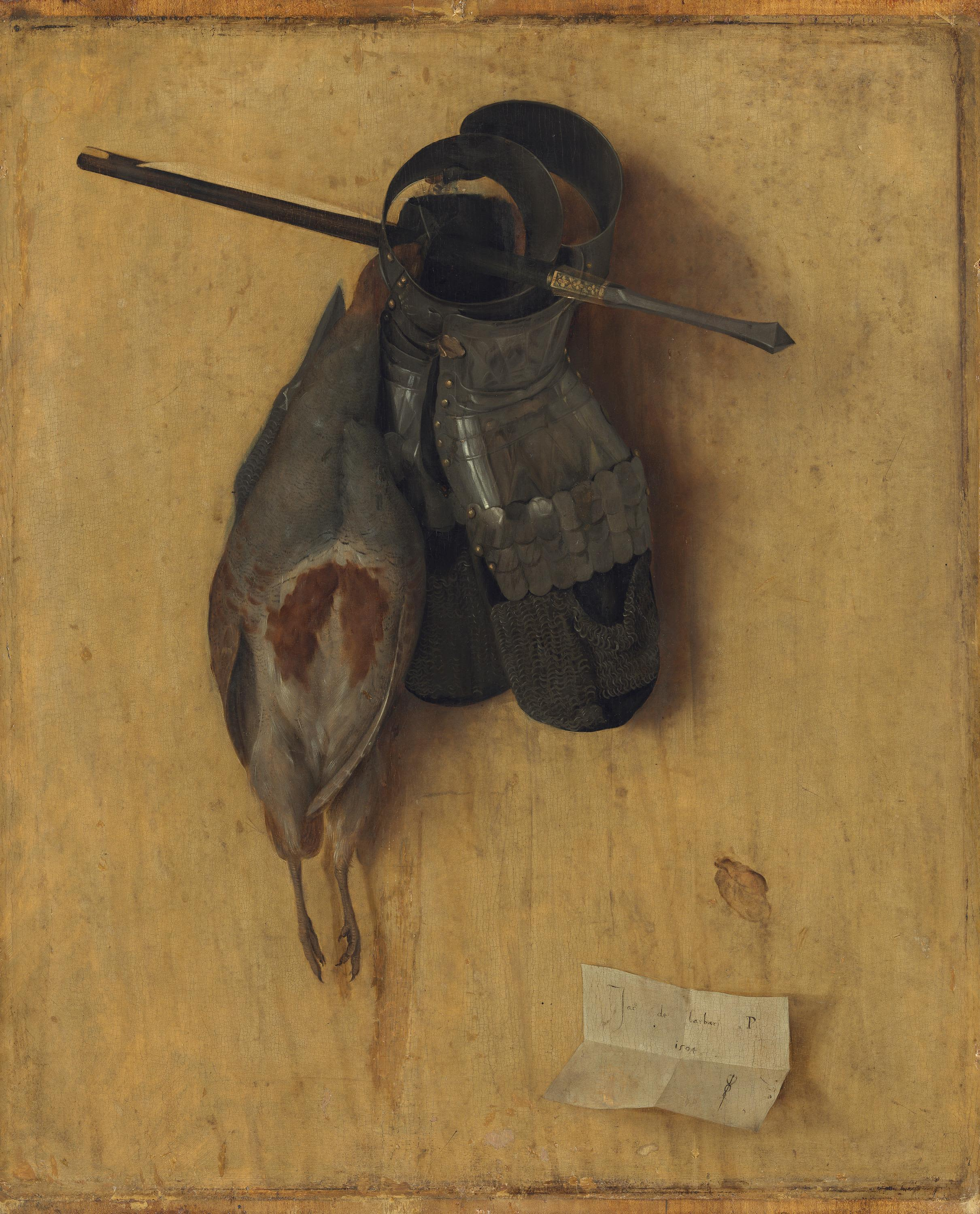
Jacopo de' Barbari c. 1440–before 1516, Still-Life with Partridge and Gauntlets, 1504

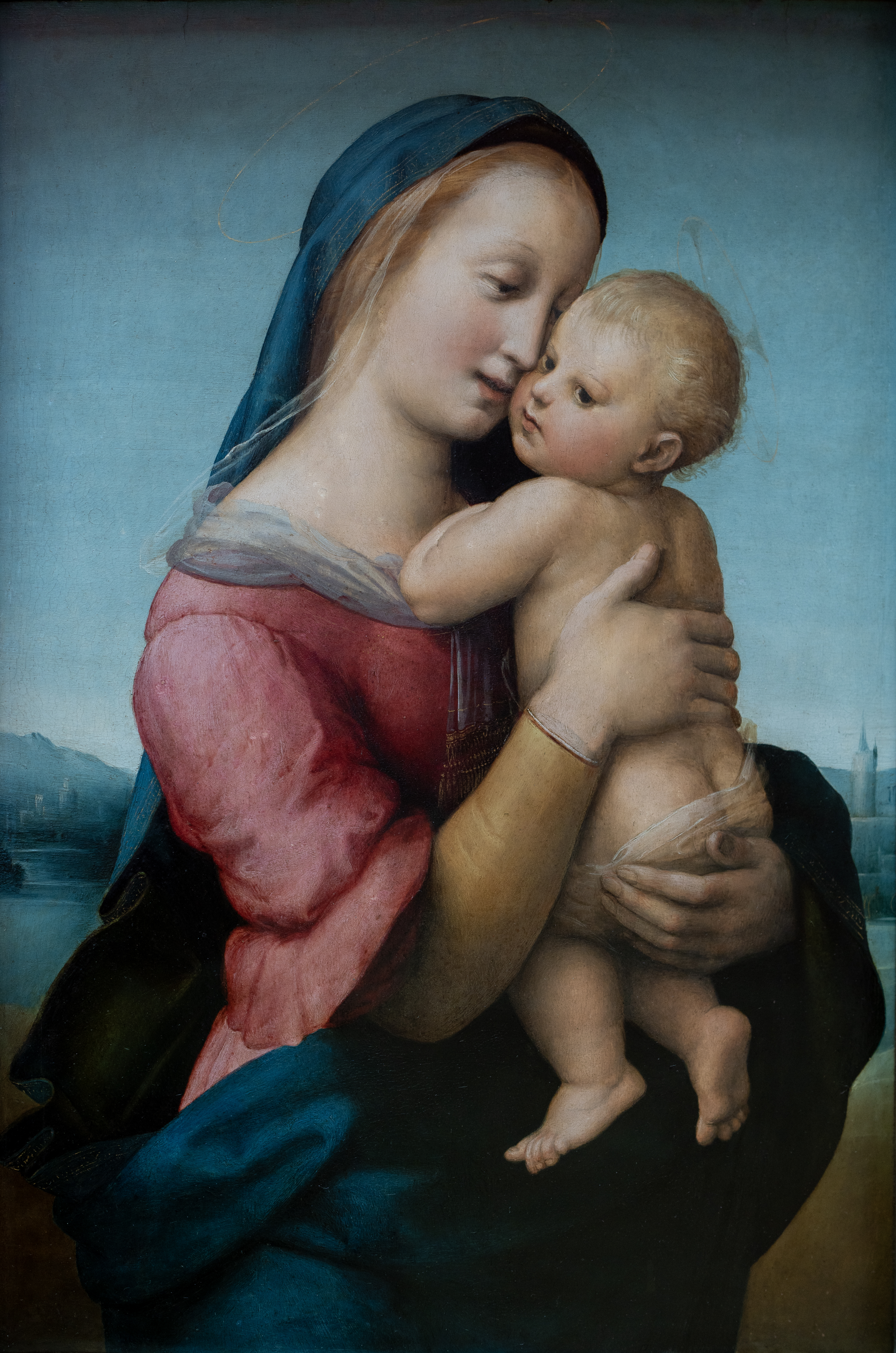
Raphael, Madonna Tempi, 1508

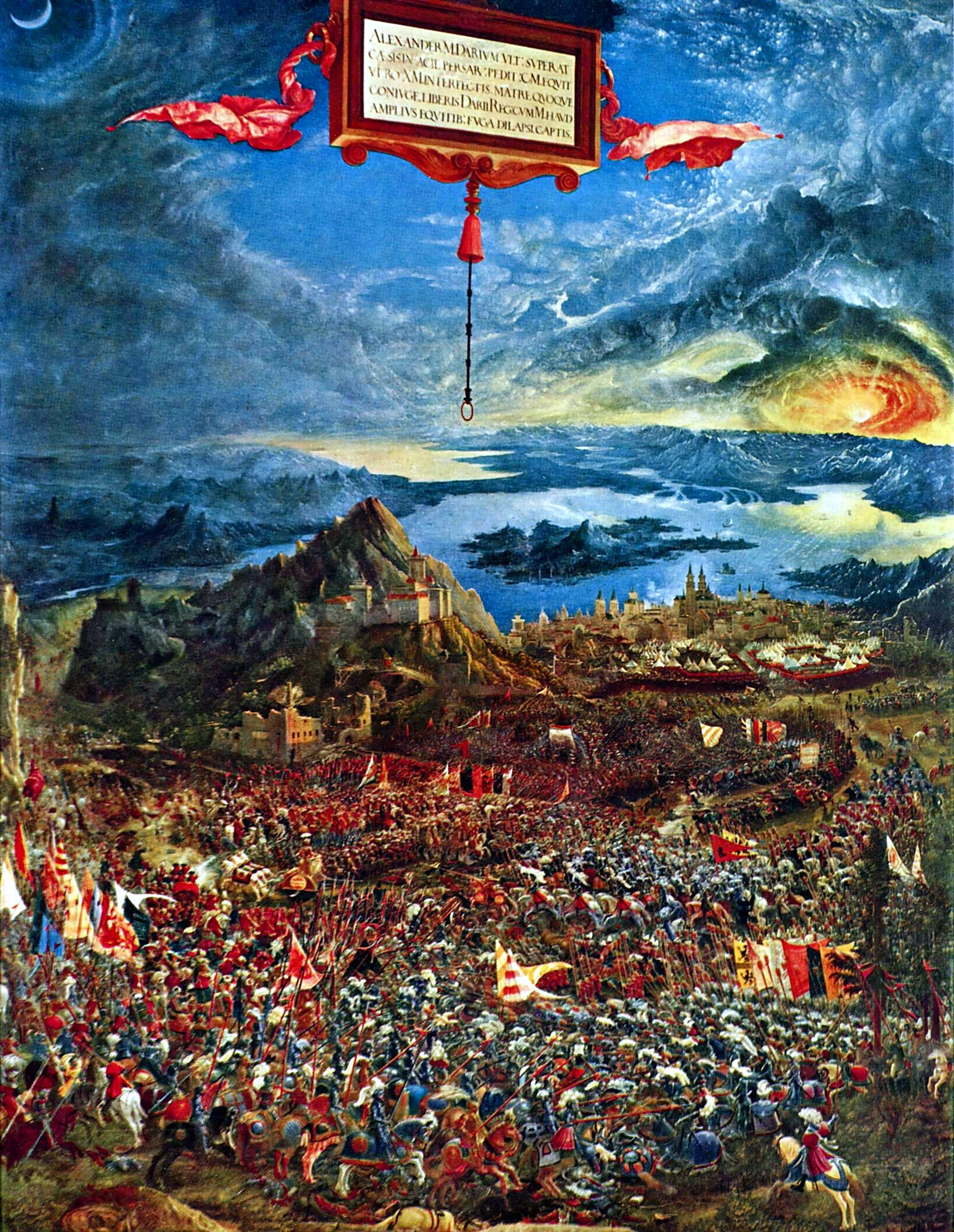
Albrecht Altdorfer, The Battle of Issus, 1529

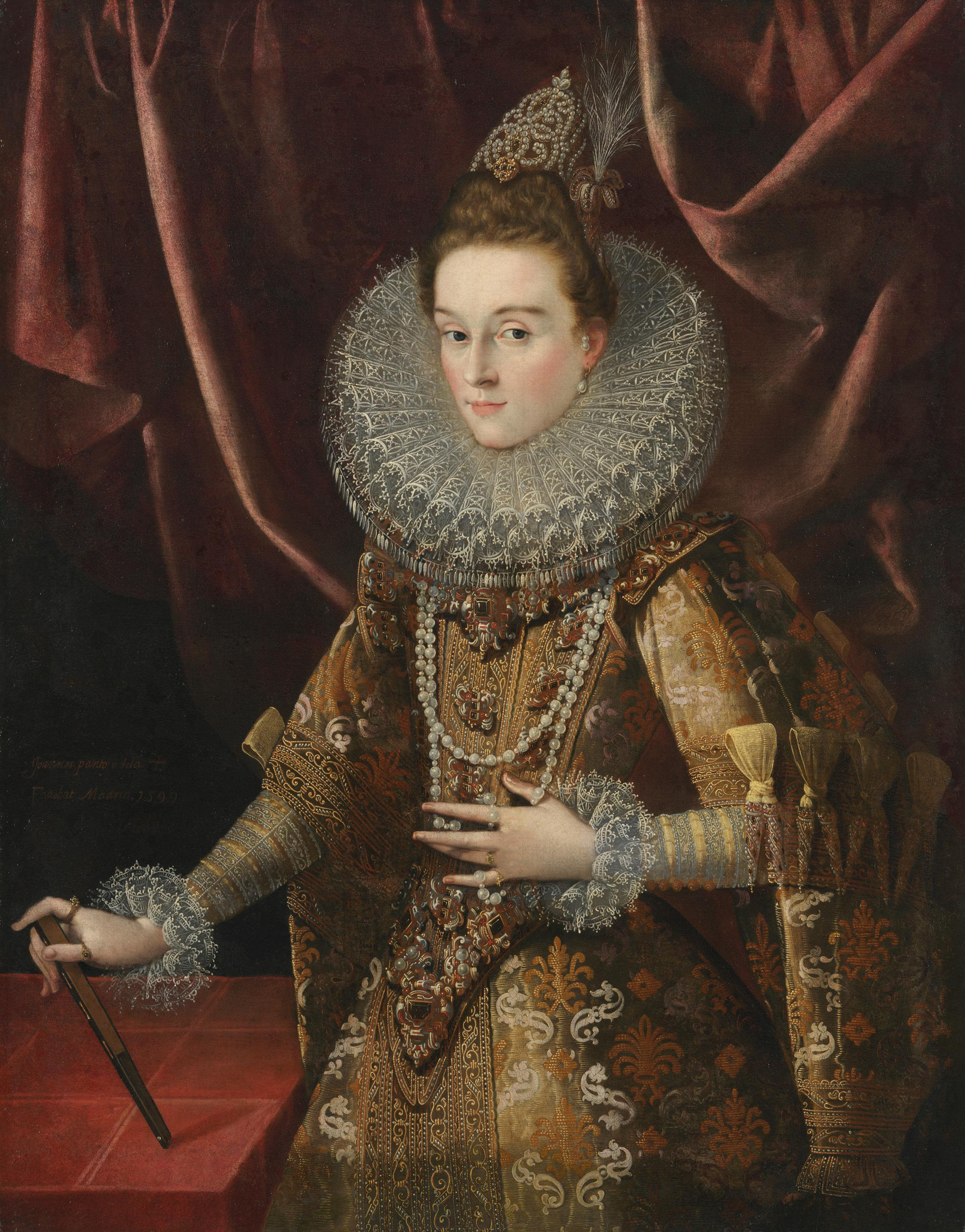
Juan Pantoja de la Cruz, Infanta Isabella Clara Eugenia, 1599

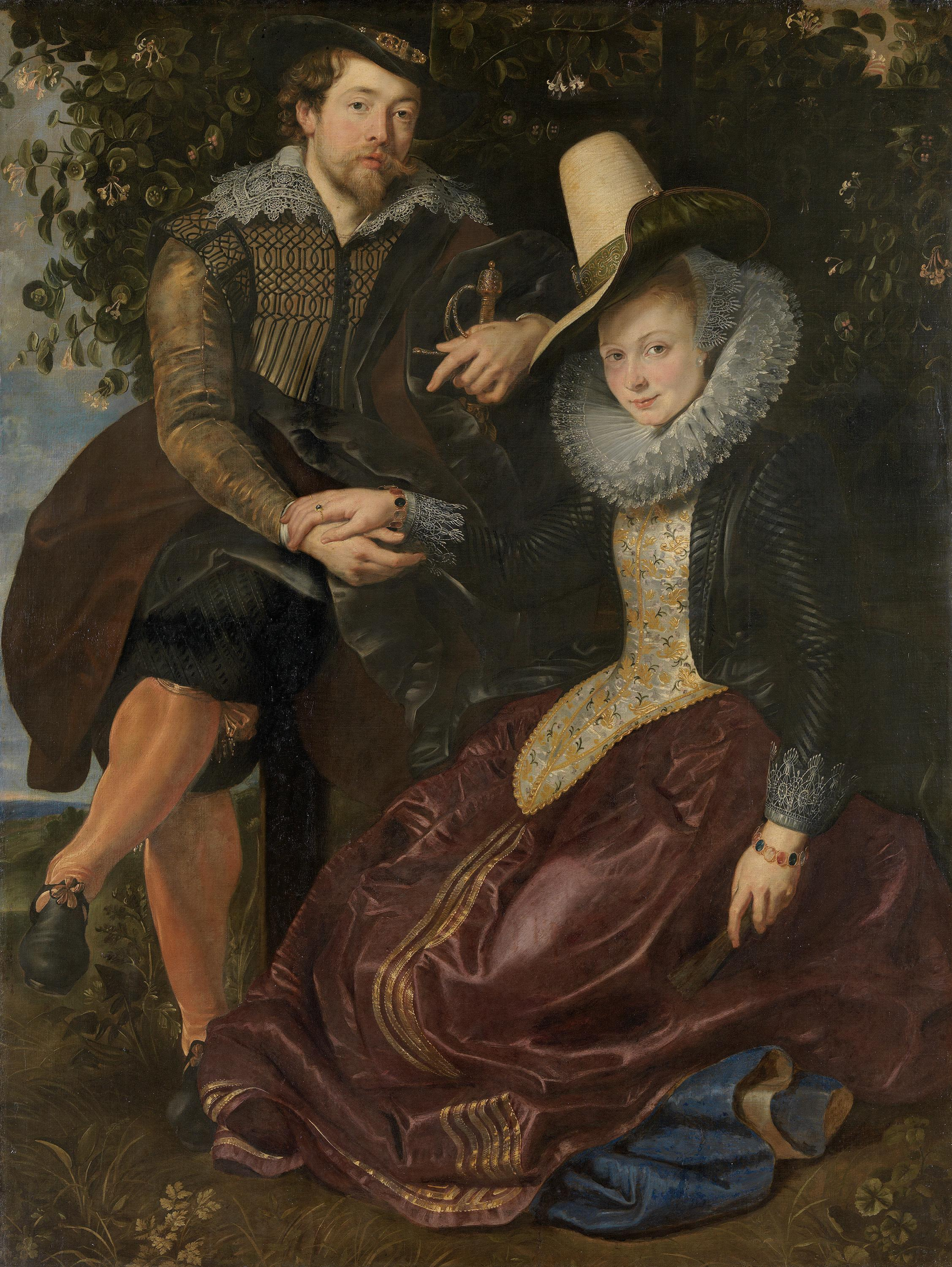
Peter Paul Rubens, Rubens and Isabella Brant in the Honeysuckle Bower, 1609

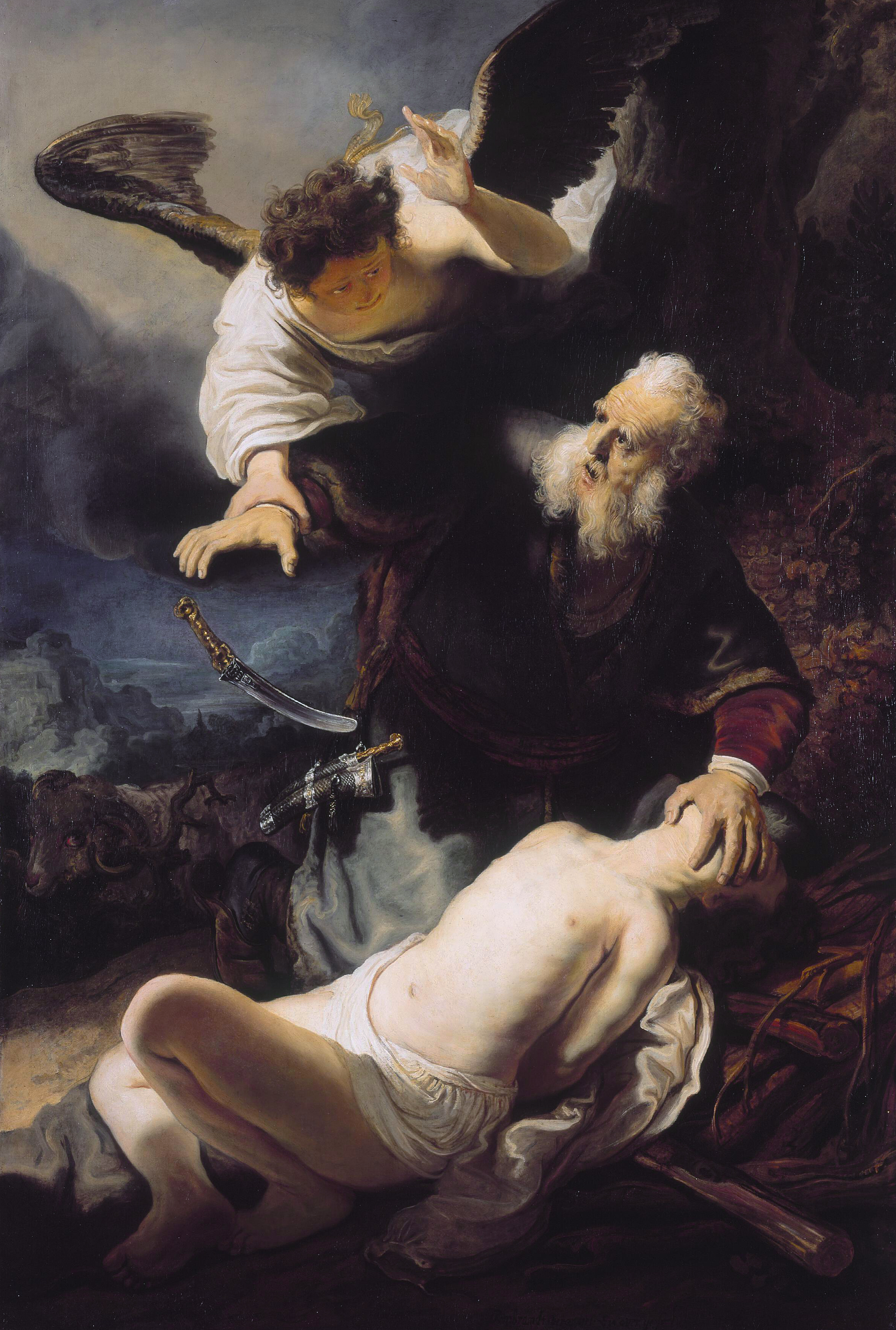
Rembrandt van Rijn, The Sacrifice of Isaac, 1636

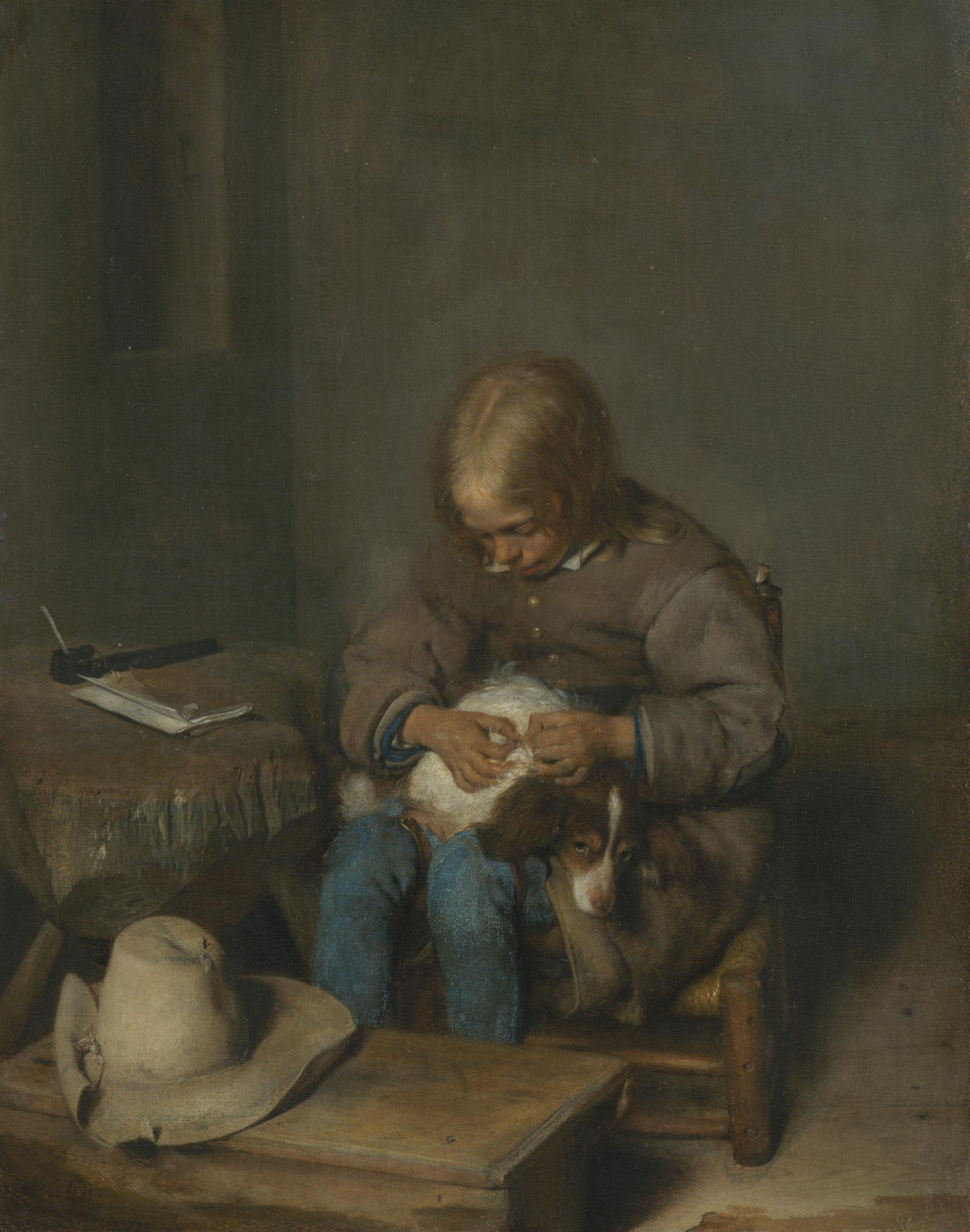
Gerard ter Borch, A Boy Picking Fleas off a Dog

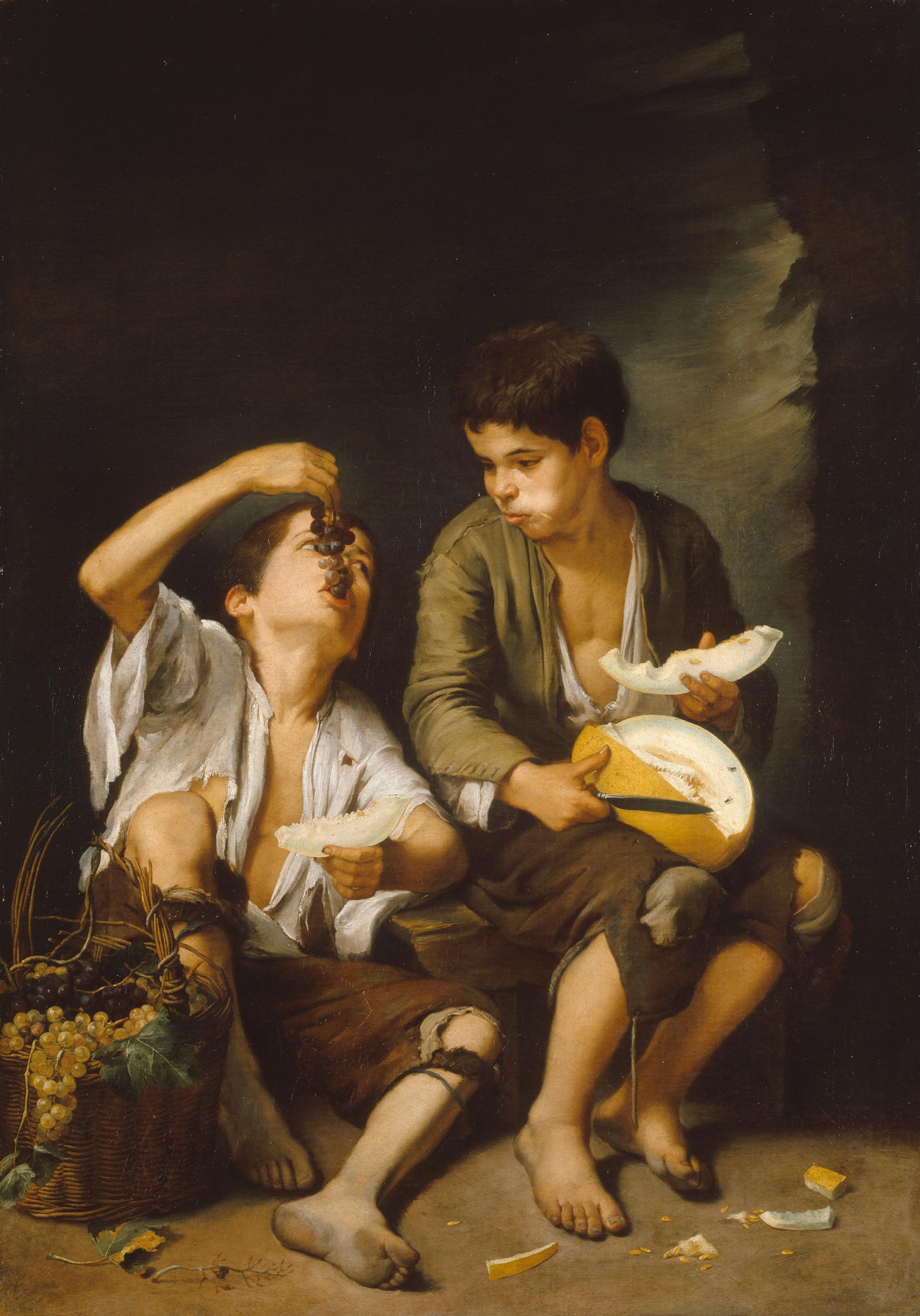
Murillo, Beggar Boys Eating Grapes and Melon, c. 1645–1655

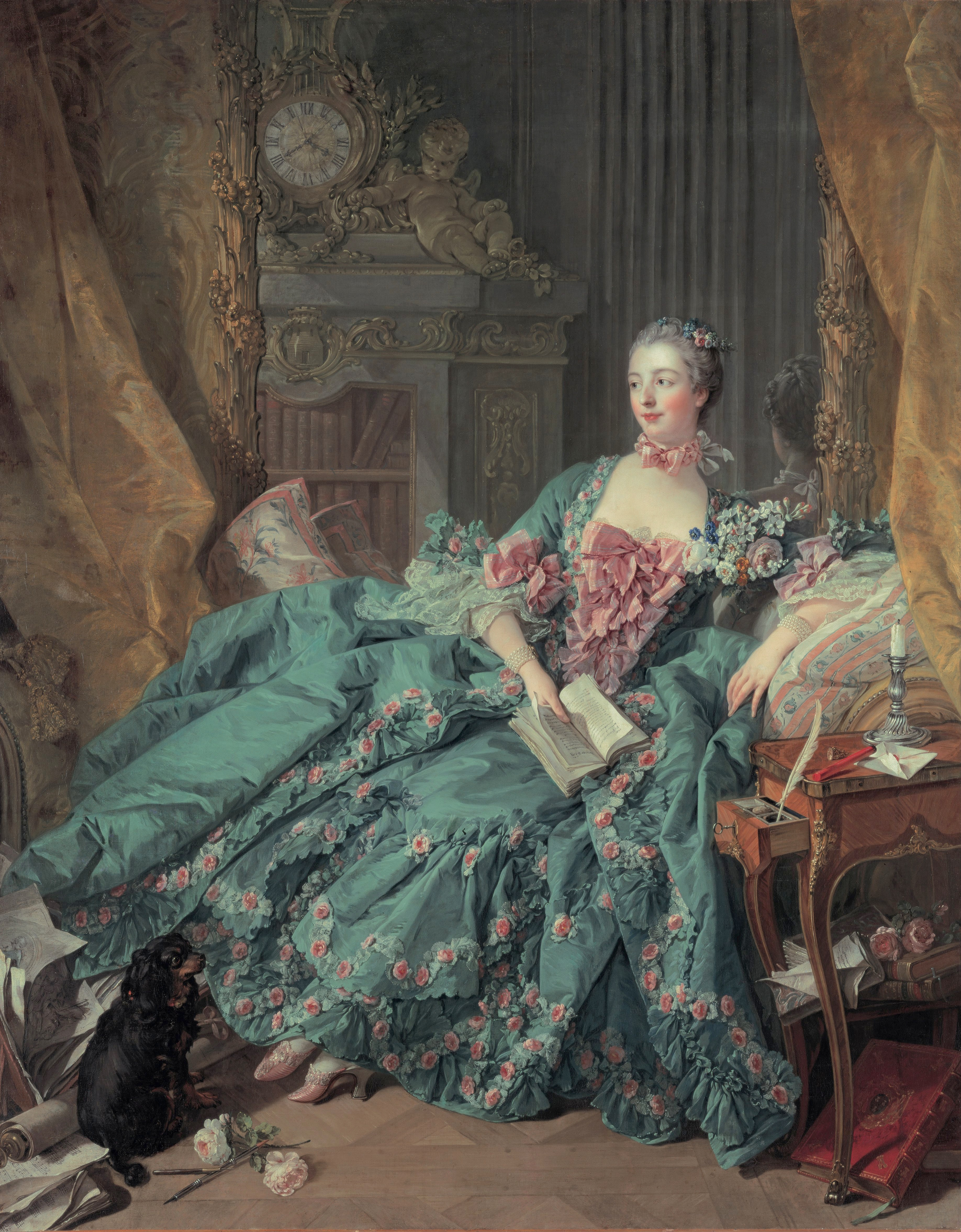
François Boucher, Madame de Pompadour, 1756

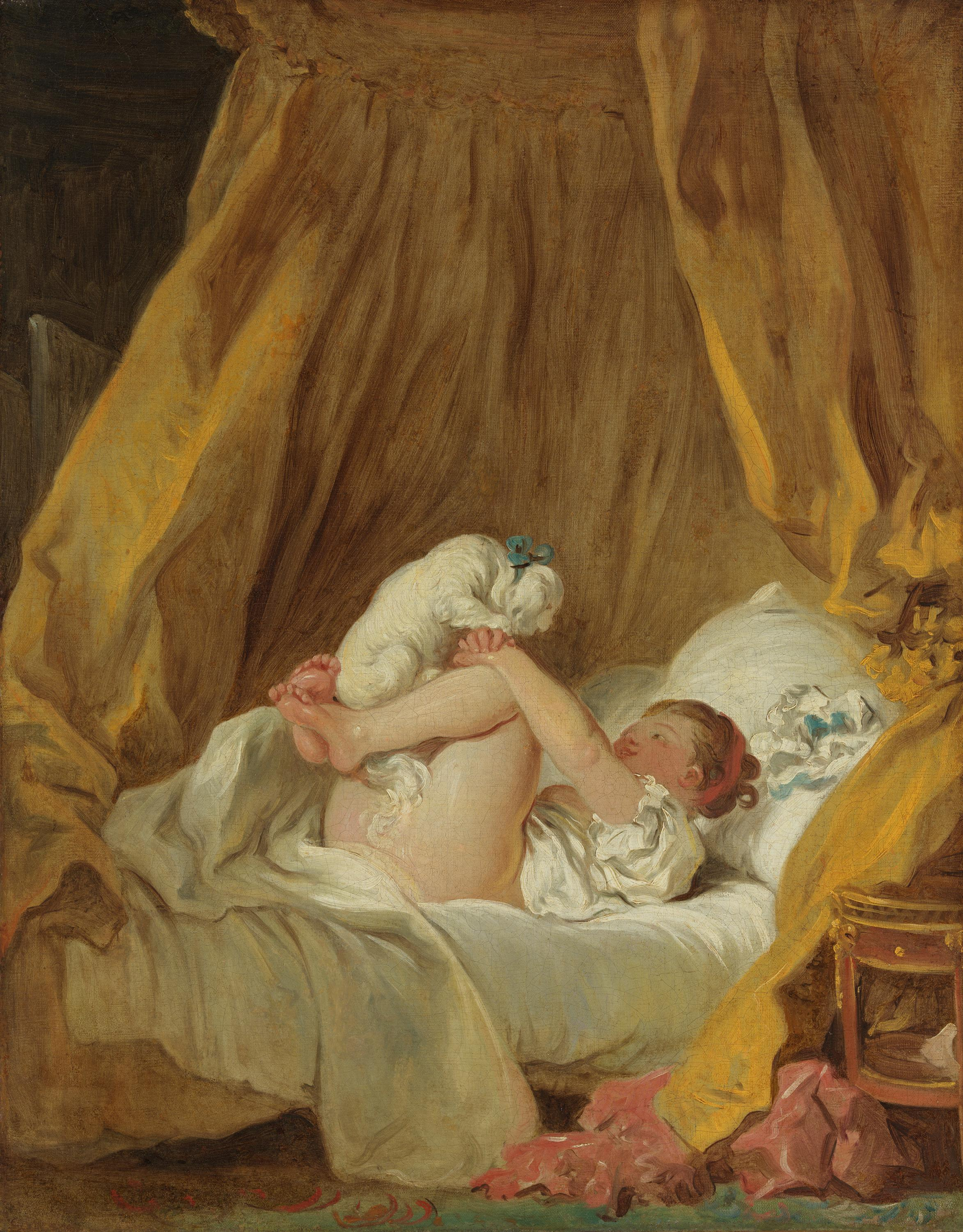
Jean-Honoré Fragonard, Girl with Dog or La Gimblette, 1770–1775
