= Tempi Madonna =

Painting by Raphael

The Tempi Madonna
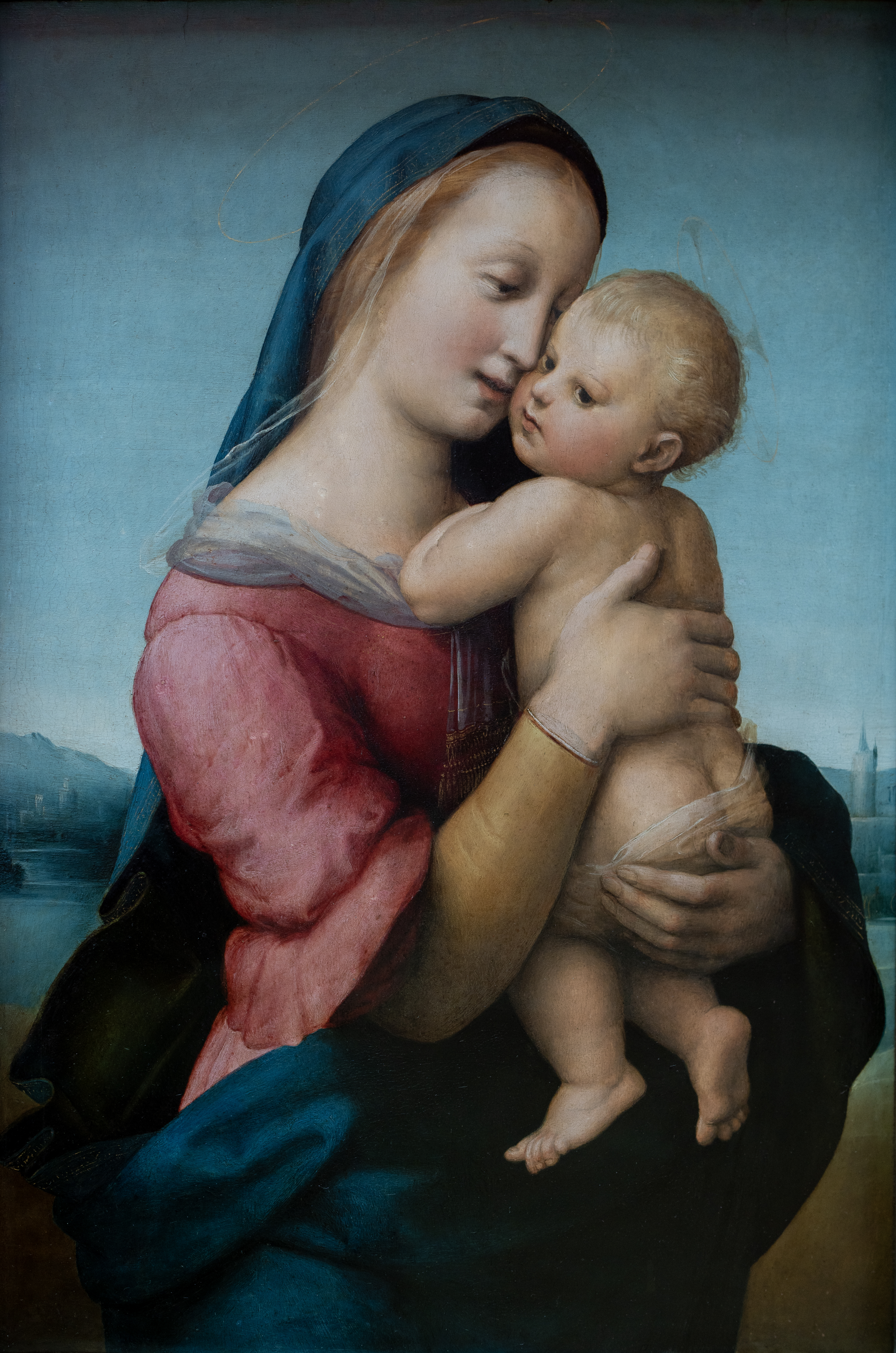
- Artist: Raphael
- Year: 1508
- Medium: Oil on wood
- Dimensions: 75 cm × 51 cm (30 in × 20 in)
- Location: Alte Pinakothek, Munich

The Tempi Madonna is an oil painting by the Italian High Renaissance artist Raphael. Created for the Tempi family, the work was acquired by Ludwig I of Bavaria in 1829 and is currently housed in the Alte Pinakothek in Munich. It is believed to have been painted in 1508, towards the end of Raphael’s Florentine period.

== See also ==
- List of paintings by Raphael
