= Johann Georg von Dillis =

German painter

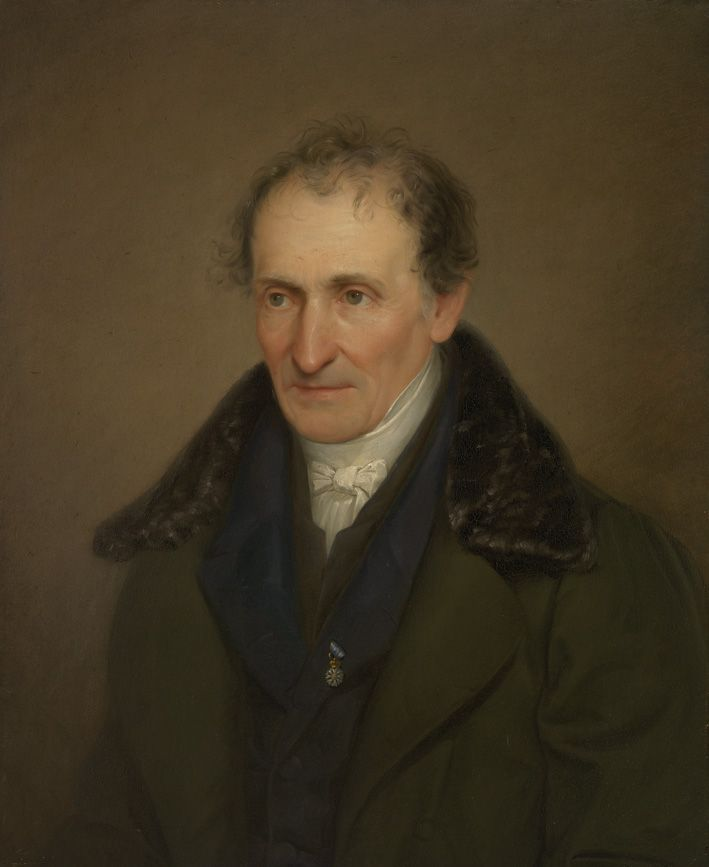
Johann Georg von Dillis in 1833, portrait by Liberat Hundertpfund

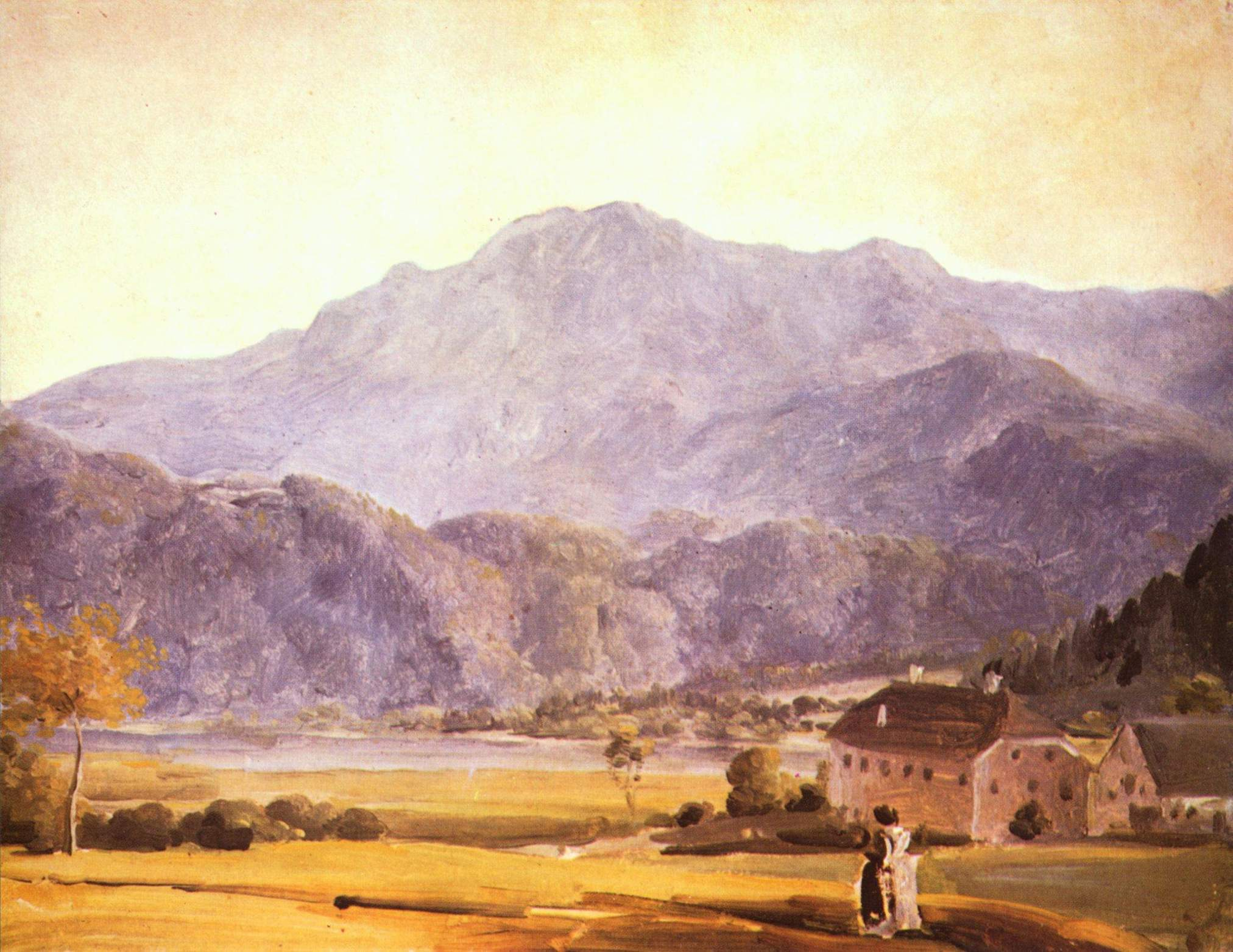
Landscape, c. 1800

Johann Georg von Dillis (26 December 1759 – 28 September 1841) was a German painter.

== Biography ==
He was born in Gmain near Dorfen. Son of a gamekeeper and forester, he was educated in Munich with support from the prince-elector of Bavaria. Initially he was trained for the priesthood, but by 1786 his real interest, art, was beginning to be developed, and he taught drawing both at court and to private families. In 1790 he was appointed inspector of the Hofgarten Galerie, the princely collection.

He continued in a curatorial role for the Bavarian court for much of the rest of his career; this allowed him some freedom to travel and expand his knowledge of European art. In 1792 he traveled to Dresden, Prague, and Vienna, and in 1794 he made his first trip to Italy, where he made watercolor studies from nature. A further trip to Italy followed in 1805, and brought him to Rome, where he met Pierre-Henri de Valenciennes, who introduced him to the idea of painting in open air.

He studied the work of Simon Denis and Joseph Mallord William Turner, and encountered Washington Allston. The next year, in Paris, he saw oil sketches by Jean-Joseph-Xavier Bidauld, and with Ludwig, the crown prince visited the Musée Napoleon; he would later advise the prince on collecting and other matters artistic, remaining in this capacity for the rest of his life. He also made several trips to Italy to purchase art for the royal collection.

In 1816 he was made responsible for packing and returning to Munich from Paris art stolen from Bavaria by Napoleon. In the fall of 1817 he and Ludwig traveled to Sicily before spending four months in Rome. Dillis helped to shape the collections of the Alte Pinakothek, which opened in 1836. He died in Munich in 1841.

== See also ==
- List of German painters
