= Franz von Reber =

German art historian

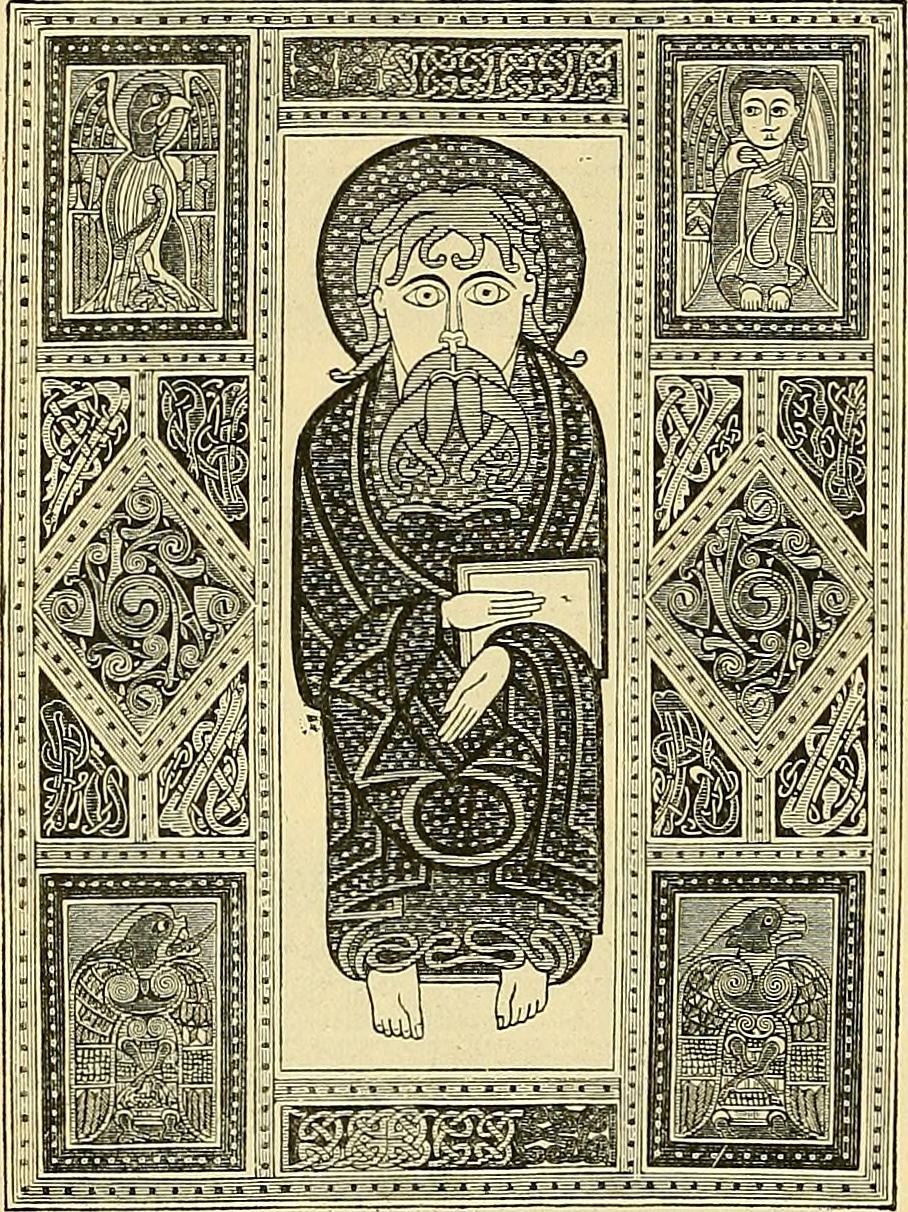
History of mediæval art (1893) by Franz von Reber.

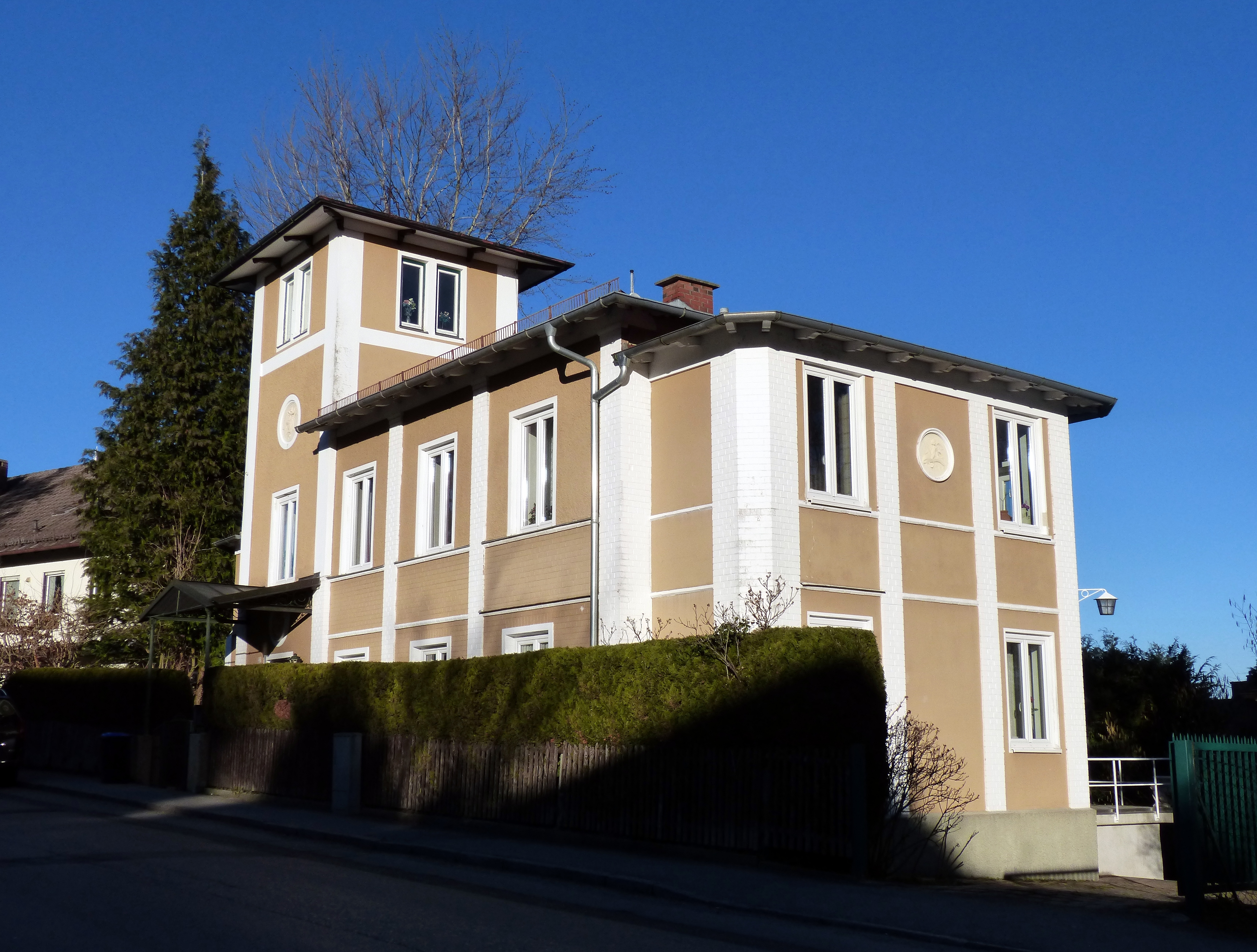
"Villa Reber" at Feldafinger Straße 15, Pöcking

Franz von Reber (10 November 1834 in Cham, Bavaria – 4 September 1919 in Pöcking) was a German art historian.

After studying at the Ludwig-Maximilians-Universität München and the Free University of Berlin, he went to Rome, and in 1858 established himself as lecturer at the Ludwig-Maximilians-Universität München, was appointed professor at the Polytechnicum of Munich in 1863 and director of the Royal Gallery in 1875.

== Writings ==
- Die Ruinen Roms und der Campagna (2d ed. 1879).
- Geschichte der Baukunst im Altertums (History of ancient architecture, 1864–67).
- Kunstgeschichte des Altertums, 1871 ("History of Ancient Art"; Eng. trans. and supplement by Clarke, New York, 1882).
- Geschichte der neueren deutschen Kunst (History of recent German art, 2d ed. 1884)
- Kunstgeschichte des Mittelalters, 1886 ("History of mediaeval art", Eng. trans. 1887).
- Geschichte der Malerei vom Anfang des 14. bis zum Ende des 18. Jahrhunderts (History of painting from the beginning of the 14th until the end of the 18th century, 1894).
- Die phrygischen Felsendenkmäler (Phrygian cliff memorials, 1897).
- Vitruvius, Des Vitruvius zehn Bücher über Architektur, as translator (1865).
- Catalogue of the paintings in the Old Pinakothek Munich with a historical introduction by Franz von Reber; translated by Joseph Thacher Clarke (1885).
- Max Rooses, Geschiedenis der Antwerpsche schilderschool (History of the Antwerp School of Painting) translated as: Geschichte der Malerschule Antwerpens von Q. Massijs bis zu den letzten Ausläufern der Schule P.P. Rubens (2nd edition, 1889).
