= The Immaculate Conception of El Escorial =

Painting by Bartolomé Esteban Murillo

- Immaculate Conception of the Granja
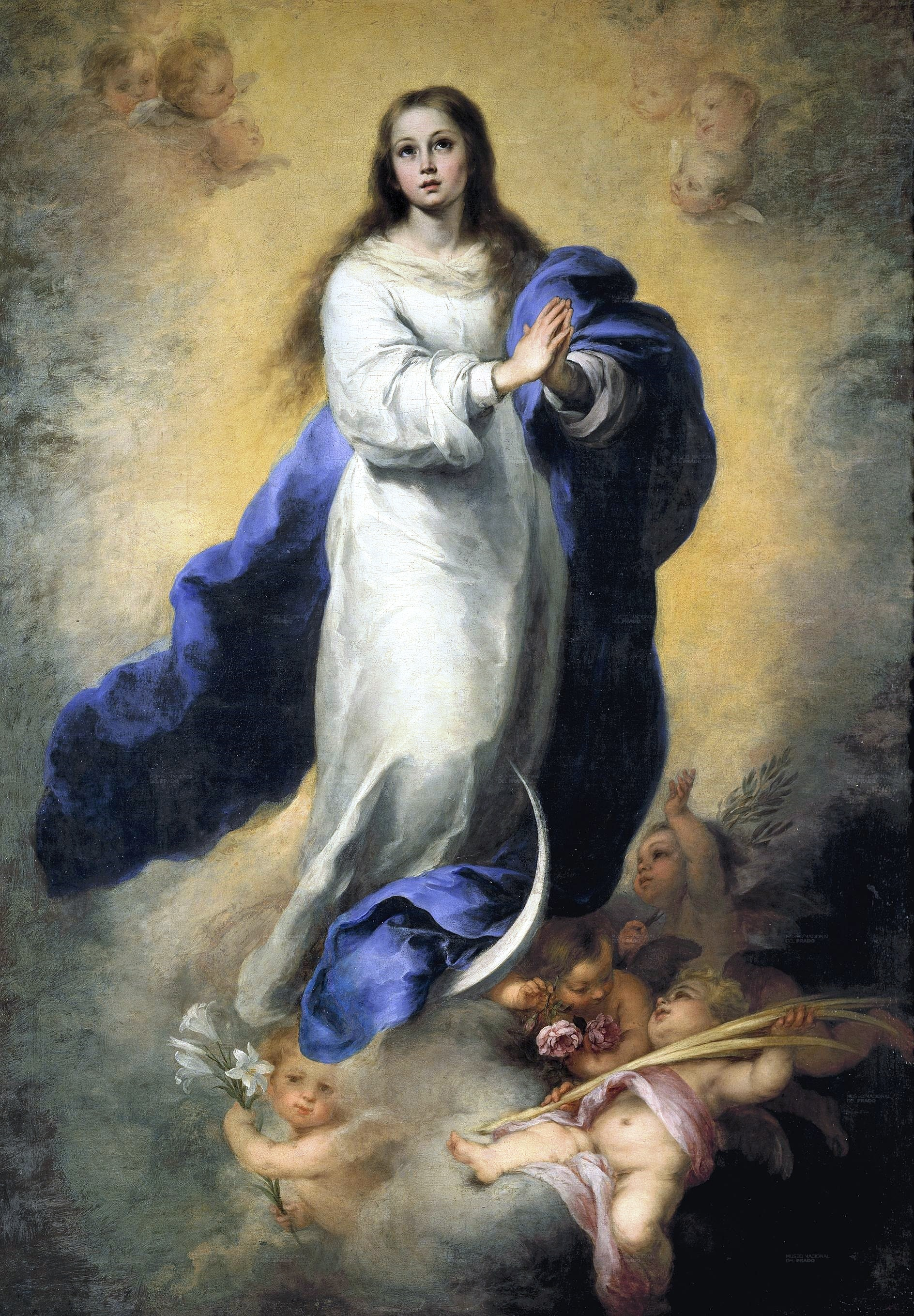
- Artist: Bartolomé Esteban Murillo
- Year: c. 1660–65
- Medium: oil paint, canvas
- Dimensions: 206 cm (81 in) × 144 cm (57 in)
- Location: Museo del Prado, Royal Palace of Madrid
- Owner: Ferdinand VII
- Accession: P000972

The Immaculate Conception of El Escorial is a circa 1660–1665 oil religious painting by the Spanish Baroque artist Bartolomé Esteban Murillo, now in the Museo del Prado in Madrid. Murillo's many artistic depictions of the Immaculate Conception of the Virgin Mary enormously influenced later art. This painting is regarded as one of his best. It was earlier identified as the Immaculate Conception of the Granja due to a mistaken understanding of its history.

== Background ==
Although the doctrine that Mary was conceived without sin was not dogmatically defined in the Catholic Church until 1854, that she was sinless was declared in 1661 by Pope Alexander VII, a declaration for which the Spanish church and the Franciscan order had long been strong proponents. To the Spanish Marian cult, not just Mary's purity but the concept that she had been conceived without sin was essential. This was the belief held by Spain and the Franciscans; by contrast, the Dominican order argued that she had been conceived in sin but purified while unborn in her mother's womb.

Even though the Immaculate Conception doctrine would not be embraced for several centuries, the Spanish rejoiced at the declaration of purity, and many Spanish artists were commissioned to depict the theme. Murillo himself produced 20 such paintings.

== Composition ==
Painted in oil, the work is displayed on a canvas 81.13 inches (2,061 mm) by 56.63 inches (1,438 mm). It depicts Mary as a young woman in a white dress and blue cloak, hands clasped in prayer and eyes upraised, ascending on a crescent moon borne by cherubs. These carry roses, lilies, a palm frond, and a mirror, all references to her purity and martyrdom. The crescent moon refers to the description of the woman of the Apocalypse, clothed with the sun and the moon under her feet, although in this version, Mary (as the woman is often identified) is not crowned or pregnant. The near disappearance of the cherubs at the top of the image has been attributed to the piece's overall sense of weightlessness.

The work is simplified from some of Murillo's earlier efforts, a result of Murillo's ongoing efforts to distill the depiction to its most iconographic form. It is, accordingly, described as "perhaps the most perfectly resolved" of Murillo's Immaculate Conception images in 2005's Seventeenth-century Art and Architecture.

Several influences on Murillo are found in the painting. His depiction of the age of Mary reflects the guidance of artist Francisco Pacheco, official censor of Seville's Inquisition, that the Virgin Mary should be shown always as a beautiful girl of 12 or 13 years old. Additionally, Murillo had been introduced to the works of Van Dyck and Rubens by Francisco Herrera the Younger, who was sub-director of the Seville Academy under Murillo. The influence of these painters is visible in the delicate and airy coloration of the piece.

The work is dated between 1660 and 1665. The exact date is undetermined because no contract for a commission for the piece has been located. Still, the range is presumed because of the style of the piece compared to his other works of the period and because of a drawing by Murillo from 1664 of the Immaculate Conception, which, though it features Mary in a different pose, uses the same two cherubs from the right of this work.

== Legacy ==
It is unknown whether or not the painting was produced on commission or when and why, but the image is believed to have found its way to the royals' collections after purchase by Charles III in Seville. It was then part of Charles IV's collection, following which it was registered among his collections in the Casita del Príncipe in the Escorial. It is from this registration that the title derives. Previously believed to have been in the Granja palace, it was for some time titled the Immaculate Conception of the Granja.

Murillo's formulation of the Immaculate Conception theme became a major influence on many subsequent artists. He has been described as "the quintessential painter of the theme of the Immaculate Conception" - this is one of four in the collection of the Prado.

== Failed restoration of another version ==
In June 2020, it was reported that a copy of the Immaculate Conception of uncertain origin had been handed to a furniture restorer for restoration, at a cost of €1,200 ($1,355; £1,087). After two attempts, the restoration was botched, with Mary's face left unrecognisable. Spain's Professional Association of Restorers and Conservators (Acre) called the attempted restoration vandalism. Comparisons were made to the 2012 'Monkey Christ' incident, a similarly botched restoration of Ecce Homo.
