= Hans-Joachim Bohlmann =

German art vandal (1937–2009)

Hans-Joachim Bohlmann in 2000.

Hans-Joachim Bohlmann (20 September 1937 – 19 January 2009) was a German serial vandal who primarily targeted artworks at public exhibitions. Between 1977 and 2006, he damaged over 50 paintings worth more than 270 million Deutsche Marks (about 138 million euro) by such artists as Rubens, Rembrandt and Dürer.

== Life ==
Bohlmann was born in Breslau (modern Wrocław).

Since his youth, Bohlmann suffered from a serious personality disorder. At the age of 16, he voluntarily went to the psychiatric clinic of the University of Kiel and underwent electric shock and insulin treatments. Around that time, he was a plumber apprentice, but could not focus on a single occupation and was doing various jobs. He had several therapy courses involving tranquilizers, antidepressants, antipsychotic drugs, behavior therapy and group therapy, but with very limited success.

In 1968, Bohlmann married and worked for six years at a warehouse. He then frequently took valium and haloperidol and regularly attended church masses. In 1974, he met the neurosurgeon Dieter Müller from the University Medical Center Hamburg-Eppendorf who suggested a lobotomy treatment. Although Müller predicted a 75–80% chance of success, the operation brought no improvement. It was later criticized as obsolete and merely reduced Bohlmann's intelligence. On 11 March 1977, his wife fell from a window while cleaning and died from injuries soon after. According to Bohlmann, the death of his wife turned him to vandalism. Previously, he often visited museums with his wife and saw the importance of art in society. He then started to buy sulfuric acid at pharmacies and spray it on paintings.

His vandalism began on 16 March 1977 in a city park and followed on 29 March 1977 in Kunsthalle Hamburg, where he damaged the painting Golden Fish by Paul Klee. It was followed by other attacks in Hamburg, Lübeck, Lüneburg, Essen, Dortmund, Hannover, Bochum, Kassel, Düsseldorf and Hamelin. On 16 August 1977, he poured sulfuric acid on several artworks including portraits of Martin Luther and his wife Katharina von Bora by Lucas Cranach the Elder in the Lower Saxony State Museum of Hanover. On 24 August 1977, he damaged the painting Archduke Albrecht by Rubens in Düsseldorf and on 7 October 1977 four paintings in Schloss Wilhelmshöhe in Kassel, estimated at more than 25 million euros, among them Rembrandt's Jacob blessing Joseph's second son, 1656, a self-portrait by Rembrandt and Willem Drost's Noli me tangere. In his attacks, Bohlmann was primarily targeting the faces of the personages, trying to inflict maximum damage. Bohlmann's activity was not restricted to paintings and museums; he ignited an altar in Lübeck and sprayed hundreds of tombstones with swastikas at night in Hamburg. The resultant outrage in the press encouraged him. As he felt he was becoming a celebrity, he abandoned the antidepressant drugs he had been taking.

Bohlmann was arrested in October 1977 and in 1979 convicted by the Hamburg Regional Court to five years in prison for 17 cases of damage to public property, 3 cases of damage to private property and one case of cruelty to animals. He served the term in full until 6 October 1982. After release from prison, Bohlmann resumed vandalism. He was then banned from buying acid and instead committed arson at a construction site near Hamburg inflicting damage estimated at 65,000 euros. For this crime, the Hamburg Regional Court sentenced him to three years ending on 5 May 1986. A part of his pension was seized for the damage done to Ruben's Archduke Albrecht, and in the autumn of 1987 he went for treatment in the psychiatric department of the Hospital Hamburg-Eilbek.

In March 1988, Bohlmann bought two litres of sulfuric acid and hid them in a park. On 20 April 1988, he took a leave from the hospital and the next day splashed acid on three paintings by Albrecht Dürer in Munich's Alte Pinakothek, namely Lamentation for Christ, Paumgartner Altar and Mater Dolarosa inflicting damage estimated at 35 million euros. Immediately after the attacks, he was arrested and held in the psychiatric hospital of Haar, Bavaria. In 1989 he was convicted by the Munich District Court to a two-year imprisonment, concurrent with treatment as long as necessary in a psychiatric hospital, and in March 1990 transferred to the clinic in Hamburg-Ochsenzoll. Bohlmann escaped from the facility in January 1998 and after being at large for two days he was found at a subway station, possibly on the way back to the hospital. On 30 July 2001 he escaped again but returned to hospital the next morning.

In Ochsenzoll he attended art therapy and for nine years painted pictures, almost every day, with a total number of about 1,500. In January 2005, more than 16 years after his arrest in Munich, Bohlmann was released to public life. On 25 June 2006, in the Rijksmuseum in Amsterdam, he splashed lighter fuel on the painting Banquet of the Amsterdam Civic Guard in Celebration of the Peace of Münster (1648) by Bartholomeus van der Helst and set fire to it. Most damage was to the varnish layer.

== See also ==
- Art destruction
- Art forgery
- Art intervention
- Art theft
- Degenerate art
- Iconoclasm
- Looted art
- Vandalism of art
