= Accidental damage of art =

Unintentional damage done to an artwork

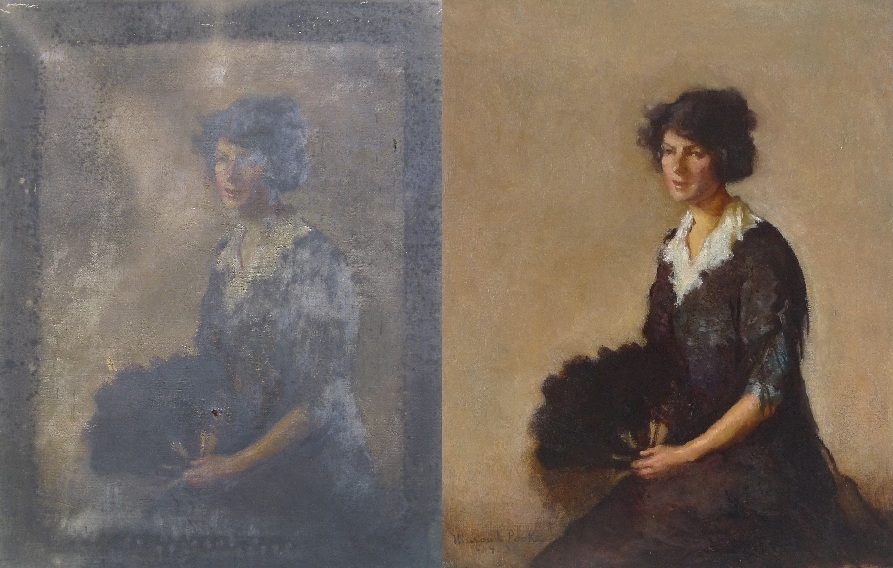
A painting damaged by fire, before and after restoration

Artwork may be damaged or destroyed as a result of various types of accidents. Damage accidents sometimes occur during exhibition or transportation. Attempts at restoration have also damaged artworks, either by expert restorers using techniques that are found decades later to be unsuitable or harmful, or simple botches by unskilled people.

== Transportation accidents ==
A large body of work by the German Renaissance master Mathis Nithart Gothart, called Grünewald, was captured by the Swedes during the Thirty Years' War but was lost when the ships transporting war booty were sunk in the Baltic by Imperial forces.

Other examples lost during sea transport include the 19th century painting La Circassienne au Bain, which was lost with the sinking of RMS Titanic in 1912.

On 2 September 1998, Swissair Flight 111 crashed near Halifax, Nova Scotia, Canada, killing 229 people. Pablo Picasso's 1963 work Le Peintre (The Painter) was part of the flight's cargo and was destroyed in the crash.

== Human error ==
In October 2006, business magnate Steve Wynn agreed to sell the 1932 painting Le Rêve by Picasso. The painting was the centerpiece of Wynn's art collection and was displayed at his Las Vegas casino. The arranged price of $139 million would make Le Rêve the most expensive art sale of the time. The day after the price deal, while showing the painting to reporters, Wynn accidentally elbowed it, creating a significant tear. After a $90,000 repair, the painting was evaluated to be worth $85 million. Wynn claimed the price difference from his Lloyd's of London insurers, and the case was eventually settled out of court in March 2007. In March 2013, Wynn sold the repaired painting to the original buyer Steven A. Cohen for $155 million, a price approximately $5 million lower than the inflation-adjusted value ($160 million in 2013) of the painting before the accident.

In 2006, a man fell after stepping on his loose shoelace at the Fitzwilliam Museum in Cambridge, and shattered three Chinese vases of the Qing dynasty (17th century). The man was not injured and not charged with damage; however, he was banned from visiting the museum. The museum managed to restore the vases, which are one of its most valuable exhibits; they are back on display but in a protective case.

On 22 January 2010, a woman accidentally fell into The Actor (L'acteur), a 1904 painting by Pablo Picasso on exhibit at the New York Metropolitan Museum of Art. The fall created a rip of about 15 centimeters (5.9 in) in height in the lower right corner of a 196 cm × 115 cm (77.25 in × 45.38 in) painting. The painting is considered one of Picasso's most important works and has an estimated value of $130 million. The damage was restored in April 2010 after three months of work. For six weeks, the painting lay flat, loaded with small silk sand bags in order to realign the mechanical stress caused by the fall. After that, a Mylar patch was placed on the back of the canvas and the front was carefully retouched. Mylar was chosen because of its transparency – the canvas contains another painting on its back. The painting was placed behind Plexiglas after the accident.

Several artworks of contemporary artist Tracey Emin were damaged by accident. Her Self Portrait: Bath (a neon light tangled in barbed wire), while exhibited in the Scottish National Gallery of Modern Art, sustained almost $2,000 worth of damage when a visitor's clothes got caught in the wire. In the same gallery, another visitor backed into her work Feeling Pregnant III. My Uncle Colin was accidentally damaged by the staff of the National Gallery of Scotland but was later repaired. In May 2004, a warehouse fire destroyed several of her works, including the embroidered tent Everyone I Have Ever Slept With 1963–1995.

In 2015, a 12-year-old boy visiting an exhibition at Huashan 1914 Creative Park, Taipei, tripped and ripped a hole in Paolo Porpora's Flowers. The painting was valued at $1.5 million (£950,000). Neither the boy nor his parents were blamed or asked to contribute to the cost of restoration, which was covered by insurance.

== Negligence and diligence ==
In 2000, porters at Sotheby's auction house in London disposed of a box using a crushing machine. They were apparently unaware that the box was not empty but contained a painting by Lucian Freud worth about $157,000.

Some contemporary exhibits were damaged as a result of diligence of museum staff who tried to clean up the museum area of what they perceived as a foreign or unclean object:

- In the 1980s, a work by Joseph Beuys was altered when a janitor neatly cleaned up what he saw as a dirty bathtub in a German art gallery.
- In 2001, staff of the London's Eyestorm Gallery tidied away an exhibit by Damien Hirst which appeared as a pile of beer bottles, ashtrays and coffee cups.
- In 2004, an employee of Tate Britain disposed of what appeared as a plastic bag of trash sitting next to an artwork; the bag was part of an exhibition "Recreation of First Public Demonstration of Auto-Destructive Art" by Gustav Metzger.
- In 2014, a cleaning lady in the Italian city of Bari threw away several artworks displayed in the context of an art show curated by Flip Project space.
- In 2024, a lift technician working at LAM Museum in The Netherlands threw away two hand-painted beer cans that had been on display in a glass elevator shaft. The cans were later retrieved, intact, and put back on display.

== Fire ==
In 1654, a gunpowder explosion in Delft destroyed the studio of Dutch artist Carel Fabritius along with most of his paintings. The artist himself died in the explosion.

On 24 December 1734, a fire in the Royal Alcázar of Madrid destroyed over 400 paintings, uncountable sculptures and thousands of documents, including the music collection of the royal chapel. Among the paintings, were works by Luca Giordano, El Greco, Giulio Cesare Procaccini, José de Ribera, Peter Paul Rubens, Frans Snyders, Massimo Stanzione, Tintoretto, Tiziano, Velázquez, and Paolo Veronese.

In May 2004, a fire destroyed the Momart warehouse in east London, together with more than 50 paintings by abstract artist Patrick Heron, as well as the works of nineteen other artists.

== Failed restoration ==
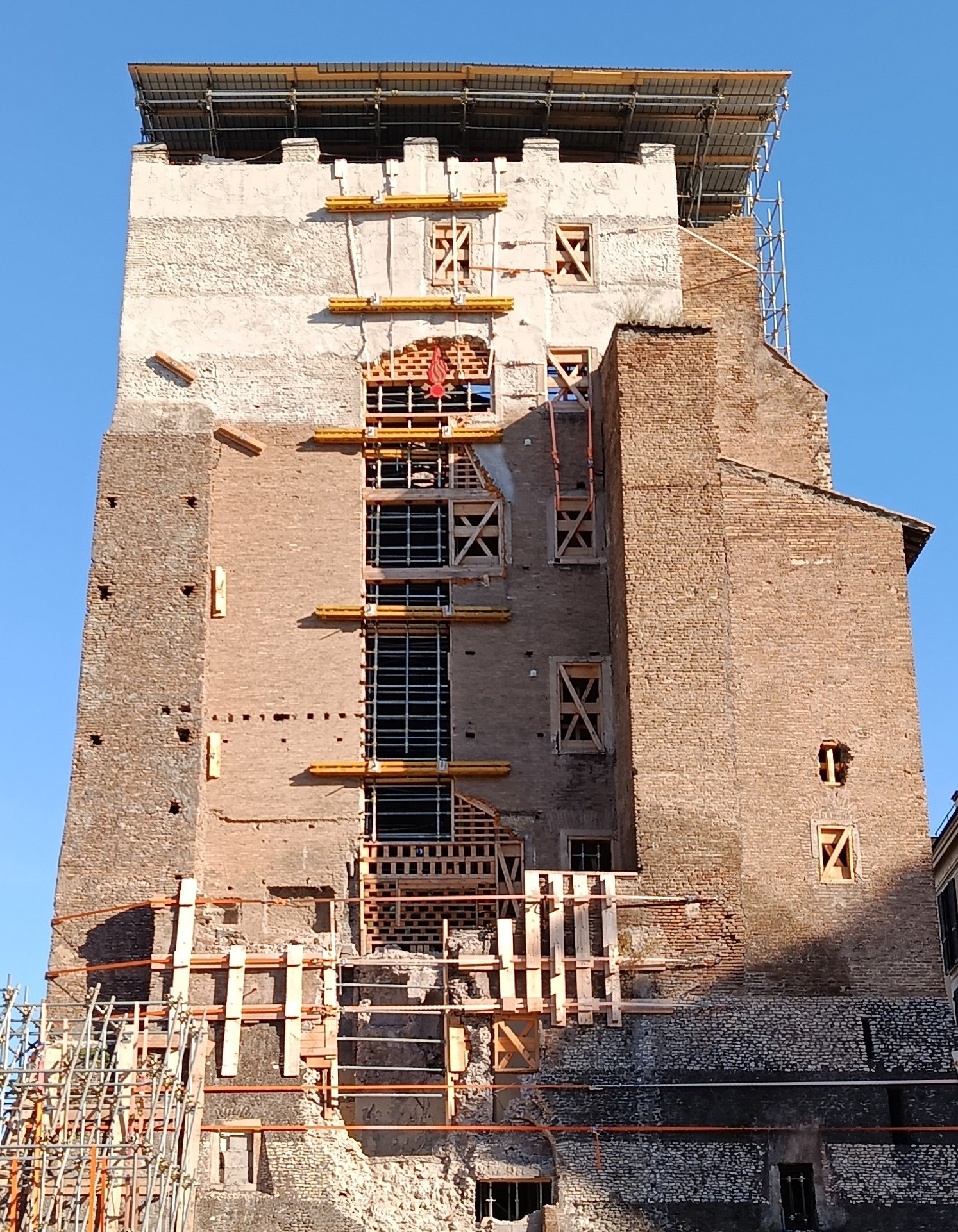
Torre dei Conti, a fortified medieval tower in Rome, suffered partial collapse during renovation works in 2025.

Methods of restoration used in the past by reputable restorers have caused serious damage to artworks. For example, in the 19th century it was usual to coat an ancient painting in wood ash, then wash it off with water in order to remove dirt built up over the centuries, but this would end up damaging the work. Sometimes more modern restoration techniques have difficulty distinguishing the original work from changes made by earlier restoration. Other restoration attempts by unqualified amateurs are simply botches, some of which have become infamous.

Several examples of failed restoration, some commissioned by or carried out by widely-respected organisations such as the Louvre and the British Museum (with respect to the damage to the Parthenon Marbles), and others by amateurs, are included in articles on the Artnet website and elsewhere.

Examples of botched amateur restoration include:

- In 2012, in Borja, Spain, an untrained elderly amateur attempted to restore the deteriorated church fresco Ecce Homo, which depicted Jesus crowned with thorns. This resulted in Jesus "resembling a crayon sketch of a very hairy monkey in an ill-fitting tunic". The restoration became an internet phenomenon, and increased tourist visits to the church.
- In 2018, in Navarre, Spain, a 16th-century statue of St. George was left "looking like a cartoon character" after a botched restoration attempt. A $34,000 "unrestoration" project in 2019 fixed most of the damage.
- In 2018, in Rañadoiro, Spain, 15th-century wooden sculptures were "restored" using industrial enamel paint, despite having been professionally restored just 15 years earlier.
- In 2020, in Valencia, Spain, a copy of The Immaculate Conception of El Escorial by Murillo was ludicrously restored.
- It came to light in 2020 that in Palencia, Spain, a woman's face in a 1923 statue adorning a bank had been incompetently restored, leading some news organizations to dub it "The Potato Head of Palencia".

== See also ==
- Art destruction
- Art forgery
- Art intervention
- Art theft
- Art theft and looting during World War II
- Conservation and restoration of cultural heritage
- Conservation science (cultural heritage)
- Degenerate art
- Iconoclasm
- Looted art
- Vandalism of art
