= Behold the Man, La Ópera de Cecilia =

2019 musical comedy

Behold the Man, La Ópera de Cecilia is a two-act, crossover musical comedy, in both English and Spanish, based on the true story of Cecilia Giménez and her failed 2012 restoration of the Ecce Homo fresco in Borja, Spain.

== Inception ==
Created by composer Paul Fowler and librettist Andrew Flack, Behold the Man is set against the backdrop of the global recession and follows Borja's economic woes while confronting the unwanted attention brought on by Cecilia's failed attempt to fix the fresco. Dubbed "the worst restoration in art history", her image of Christ was swept up on social media and glorified with countless parodies and memes. Shunned by her neighbors and shamed online, Cecilia slipped into despair before the incident was accepted by her community and recognized as a good deed gone wrong, prompting the realization that "a disaster had become a miracle". Behold the Man centers on Cecilia's story with a cast of fictionalized Borja characters. Included in the storytelling ensemble is the ghost of the fresco's original painter, Elías García Martínez, a local priest, a financially strapped young couple, Borja's mayor, and Cecilia's son and his wife. In the eight years since the 2012 Ecce Homo incident, it is estimated more than 250,000 visitors have made the pilgrimage to Borja to see Cecilia's Ecce Homo first-hand.

== Development ==
Composer Paul Fowler and librettist Andrew Flack began researching and writing Behold the Man in September, 2012, shortly after learning of Cecilia's restoration-gone-wrong. From first reports, it was clear the story had captured the imagination of the international press and was taking social media by storm, quickly achieving the status of "internet sensation". Almost immediately visitors from around the world began to arrive, posting selfies to Facebook while celebrating the Ecce Homo phenomenon. Following the media coverage from their home base in Colorado, the authors could see a silver lining in the offing and continued crafting Behold the Man in real-time as events unfolded in Borja. As news of Cecilia's transgression continued to spread, even Conan and Saturday Night Live joined the response with segments in "Weekend Update", featuring Kate McKinnon in the role of Cecilia. Almost two years into the project, with the completion of Act 1, Fowler and Flack hosted the first staged reading of the work in Boulder, Colorado, directed by Amanda Berg Wilson.

== Production ==
The following year with the completion of Act 2, a second reading was produced in Boulder. In 2016, Fowler began orchestrations while Flack worked with translator H. F. Pascual on the Spanish version, La Ópera del Ecce Homo. In 2016, the town of Borja hosted a concert of selected material attended by 700 locals and tourists. The mayor declared it a historic evening. During this four-year period, librettist Andrew Flack and business partner Barbara Duff, traveled frequently to Borja, visiting with Cecilia and her family and acquiring the rights to her story. In 2018, Behold the Man received a full orchestral reading at Arizona State University under the direction of its musical theatre/opera department head, Brian DeMaris. In 2019, Behold the Man was awarded a slot in Fort Worth Opera's prestigious "Frontiers" New Works Showcase. Behold the Man's university premiere opened October 29, 2021, at Wingate University in North Carolina under the direction of Jessie Wright Martin and the musical direction of Annie Brooks Stankovic. To date, the real Cecilia remains the international 'gold standard' for botched art restorations and is mentioned whenever a work anywhere in the world is unsuccessfully restored.

== Synopsis ==
=== Act 1 ===
Act 1 begins as Cecilia recounts to her sister, Beatriz, a dream in which the Lord has come to her requesting that she restore the Ecce Homo fresco. Beatriz doubts Cecilia's ability to do the work because of poor eyesight and questionable skill. The mayor explains to the townspeople the details of the financial crisis they are facing and possible ways to improve tourism. Marcos, Cecilia's son, decides to commission the restoration of Ecce Homo as a gift to his wife, who also happens to be the granddaughter of Elías García Martínez, the original artist. The mayor agrees that a restored fresco might be an attractive addition to their marketing portfolio. The priest, who has been put in charge of finding the right restorer for the job, lets slip he may cut corners in his candidate search. But when Cecilia volunteers to do the job without pay, the priest readily accepts, if she will promise to never admit it was she who did the work. Buffeted by the town's financial woes Cecilia's son, Marcos, attempts to sell his struggling hotel and we learn of the guilt he feels for not being able to repay his mother's initial investment. Martinez, the ghost of the original artist, reminiscences on his carefree holidays spent in Borja as a boy. And a young couple, Arturo and Silvia, members of "the jobless generation", consider leaving Borja for greener pastures. Adriana, the town's diva and Marcos' wife, makes a grand entrance, revealing she's been diagnosed with "affluenza", the "disease of having too much money". Marco tells her of the planned restoration of her grandfather's fresco, which leaves her nonplussed, except to say it must not be carried out by his mother. Meanwhile, in the church, Cecilia begins work on the Ecce Homo fresco as the ghost of Artist Martinez anxiously looks on.

=== Act 2 ===
Act 2 opens rife with rumors that the fresco's restoration has gone awry. Agitated townspeople gather in the church to find the priest nervously guarding the veiled fresco. With a deft touch, Arturo lifts the drape to the great horror of those assembled, revealing Cecilia's failed attempt, before taking a selfie with the new Ecce which he posts to Facebook. As a mob forms to find Cecilia, the priest slyly reminds her that she has sworn an oath to not divulge its authorship. But when confronted by her son, Cecilia quickly confesses to the crime. Alerted to the growing controversy via the internet, swarms of curious tourists descend on Borja to experience "Potato Head Jesus", for themselves. And as the town reels from the global humiliation, Arturo suggests they make the best of a bad situation and adapt the Ecce Homo into a marketable brand. Factions form of those in agreement with this strategy and those opposed. Adriana is aghast at the crass, commercial proceedings, in conflict with her husband, Marcos, who is delighted to see his hotel fully booked. Cecilia accepts responsibility for the botched job while the priest reveals that the money he was given to pay for the restoration was not used in a nefarious way, but to support an aged friend in the local nursing home. The mayor and the townspeople forgive Cecilia, hailing her the town's new hero, as she forgives them for their cruel initial response. Finally able to reimburse his mother's loan, Marcos reconciles with Cecilia and the opera ends with the ghost of Artist Martinez releasing his earthly ties and moving on. For the finale, the full ensemble sings "God Chose", with lyrics from 1st Corinthians, verses 26–28.

Brothers and sisters, think of what you were when you were called. Not many of you were wise by human standards; not many were influential; not many were of noble birth. 27 But God chose the foolish things of the world to shame the wise; God chose the weak things of the world to shame the strong. 28 God chose the lowly things of this world and the despised things—and the things that are not—to nullify the things that are.

== Characters ==
1. Cecilia (mezzo-soprano) The fresco's aged restorer, Marcos' mother
2. Beatriz (contralto) Cecilia's sister
3. Artist Martinez (baritone) The spirit presence of the artist who painted the original 1930 fresco
4. Marcos (tenor) Cecilia's son, father of Silvia, husband of Adriana
5. Silvia (soprano) Marcos' daughter, manager of the hat shop
6. Arturo/Artura (baritone or mezzo-soprano) Silvia's lover
7. Alcalde (tenor) Borja's mayor
8. Cura Viejo (bass-baritone) Parish priest, Cecilia's dear friend and confidant
9. Adriana (soprano) Marcos' wife, granddaughter of Artist Martínez
10. Ecce Homo (baritone) The fresco as performed by Artist Martínez

== Musical numbers ==
=== Act 1 ===
1. Cecilia: It's Faith That Guides My Brush
2. Marcos: My Little Hotel
3. Artist Martinez: Martinez Hats
4. Adriana: Affluenza

=== Act 2 ===
1. Silvia & Arturo: Come Getcho Ecce
2. Silvia & Cecilia: Beautiful Swan
3. Full cast finale: God Chose

== Musical structure ==
Behold the Man is a crossover hybrid musical, featuring elements of opera and musical theatre. The material employs a wide range of influences from Aragonese folk music to flamenco, sacred music to romantic opera, and Sinatra to K-pop. Because Cecilia's story grew to prominence on the internet, the music, too, refers and reflects the universe of musical possibilities found online. Each character is given a signature style to deliver their unique point of view. Church music, bel canto, baroque, broadway, zarzuela, jota, pop and many other forms are evident in the musical palette.

== Productions ==
Staged reading of act 1 – Boulder, Colorado, July 19, 2014
Artist Martinez: Adam Ewing, Cecilia: Eve Orenstein, Beatriz: Marjorie Bunday, Marcos: Steven Uliana, Adriana: Tana Cochran, Silvia: Luisa Marie Rodriguez, Arturo: Ryan Parker, Alcade: Haley Dove Montoya, Cura Viejo: Philip Judge, Music Direction: Paul Fowler, Stage Direction: Amanda Berg Wilson, Accompanist: Allan Armstrong, Video Projection: Andrew Flack

Staged reading of act 2 – Boulder, Colorado, July 18, 2015
Artist Martinez: Adam Ewing, Cecilia: Marjorie Fowler, Beatriz: Eve Orenstein, Marcos: Anthony Weber, Adriana: Amanda Raddatz, Silvia: Amy Maples, Arturo: Jeremy Rill, Alcade: Dean Fowler, Old Priest: Philip Judge, Music Direction: Paul Fowler, Stage Direction: Amanda Berg Wilson, Accompanist: Sara Parkinson, Video Projection: Andrew Flack
Borja concert (in Spanish) of material from La Ópera de Cecilia, August 20, 2016 in Borja, Spain
Artist Martinez: David Cerdá (barítono), Cecilia: Sara Almazán (mezzo-soprano), Beatriz: Susana Cabrero (mezzo-soprano), Marcos: Pedro Calavia (tenor), Adriana: Eugenia Enguita (soprano), Silvia: Esmeralda Jiménez (soprano), Arturo: David Cerdá (barítono), Alcalde: Jorge Velilla (tenor), Pianist: Eliberto Sánchez, Titular Director of the Coral Vientos del Pueblo: Emilio Jiménez, Guest Director: Lidia Fernández, Musical Director: Esmeralda Jiménez Ferrández

Orchestral reading, Arizona State University, Tempe, Arizona, May 18 & 19, 2018
Artist Martinez: David Nelson, Cecilia: Ariana Warren, Beatriz: Miriam Schildkret, Marcos: Charles Aldrich, Adriana: Kyla McCarrell, Silvia: Melanie Holm, Arturo: Michael Tallino, Alcade: Eric Flyte, Cura Viejo: Elliot Wulff, Ensemble: Sara Louise, Jennifer Madruga, Logan Ferguson, Randall Morin, Emily Cottam, Megan Law, Miles Coe, Music and Stage Direction: Brian DeMaris, Chorus Master: Erica Glenn, Video Projection: Andrew Flack
Arizona State University Orchestra: violin I: Christiano Rodriguez, violin II: Vladimir Gebe, viola: Dana Zhou, bass: Zach Bush, piano: Michael Lewis, guitar: Diego Miranda, percussion: Zach Paris, flute: Abby Simpson Pucket, oboe: Sarah Bates-Kennard, clarinet: Shengwen Wu, bassoon: Kiefer Strickland, trumpet: Aaron Lovelady, horn: Alexis Lovelady, trombone: Liam Russell

Fort Worth Opera "Frontiers" New Works Showcase, May 8, 2019
Cecilia: Heather Weirich, Marcos: Jonathan Walker-Vankuren, Adriana: Janani Sridhar, Silvia: Anne Wright, Martínez: Erik Earl Larson, Mezzo: Shannon Moy, Accompanist: Michael Sherman.

Opera premiere at Wingate University, October 29 & 30, 2021
At Wingate University, North Carolina, under the direction of Jessie Wright Martin and the musical direction of Annie Brooks Stankovic

Opera Las Vegas world premiere, September 30 & October 1, 2023
Musical director, Joshua Horsch; stage director, Audrey Chait; Catherine M. Pratt, lighting and projections design. Appearing in the production is Kimberly Gratland James as Cecilia; Ashley Stone as Beatriz; André Chiang as The Artist Martínez; Tyler Putnam as Cura Viejo; William McCullough as Marcos; Olivia Yorkers as Adriana; Athena Mertes as Silvia; Marshall Morrow as Arturo; and Collin Salmon as Alcalde.

Marisa Ibáñez, niece of Cecilia Giménez, the opera's protagonist, traveled from Spain to attend the Las Vegas premiere.
