= Art crime =

Art crime may refer to:

- Art theft
- Art forgery
- Vandalism of art
