= Art destruction =

Damaging or destruction of works of art

Art destruction is the decay or material destruction of original works of art. This can happen willfully, accidentally, or through natural processes.

== Temporary artwork ==
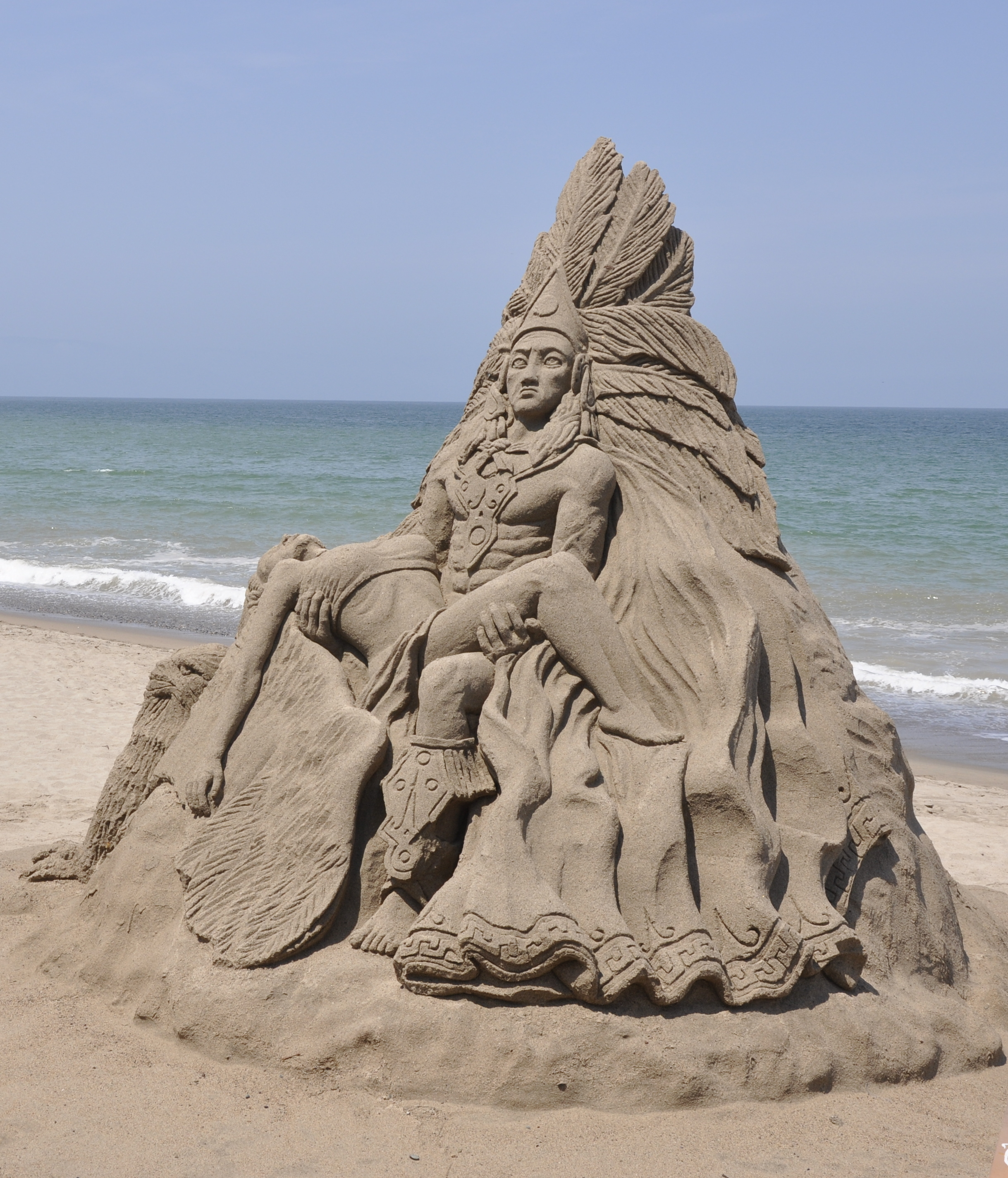
A sand sculpture on a beach

Many works of visual art are intended by the artist to be temporary. They may be created in media which the artist knows to be temporary, such as sand, or they may be designed specifically to be recycled. Often the destruction takes place during a ceremony or special event. Examples of this type of art include street painting, sand art such as sandcastles, ice sculptures and edible art.

== Artists who sabotage their own work ==
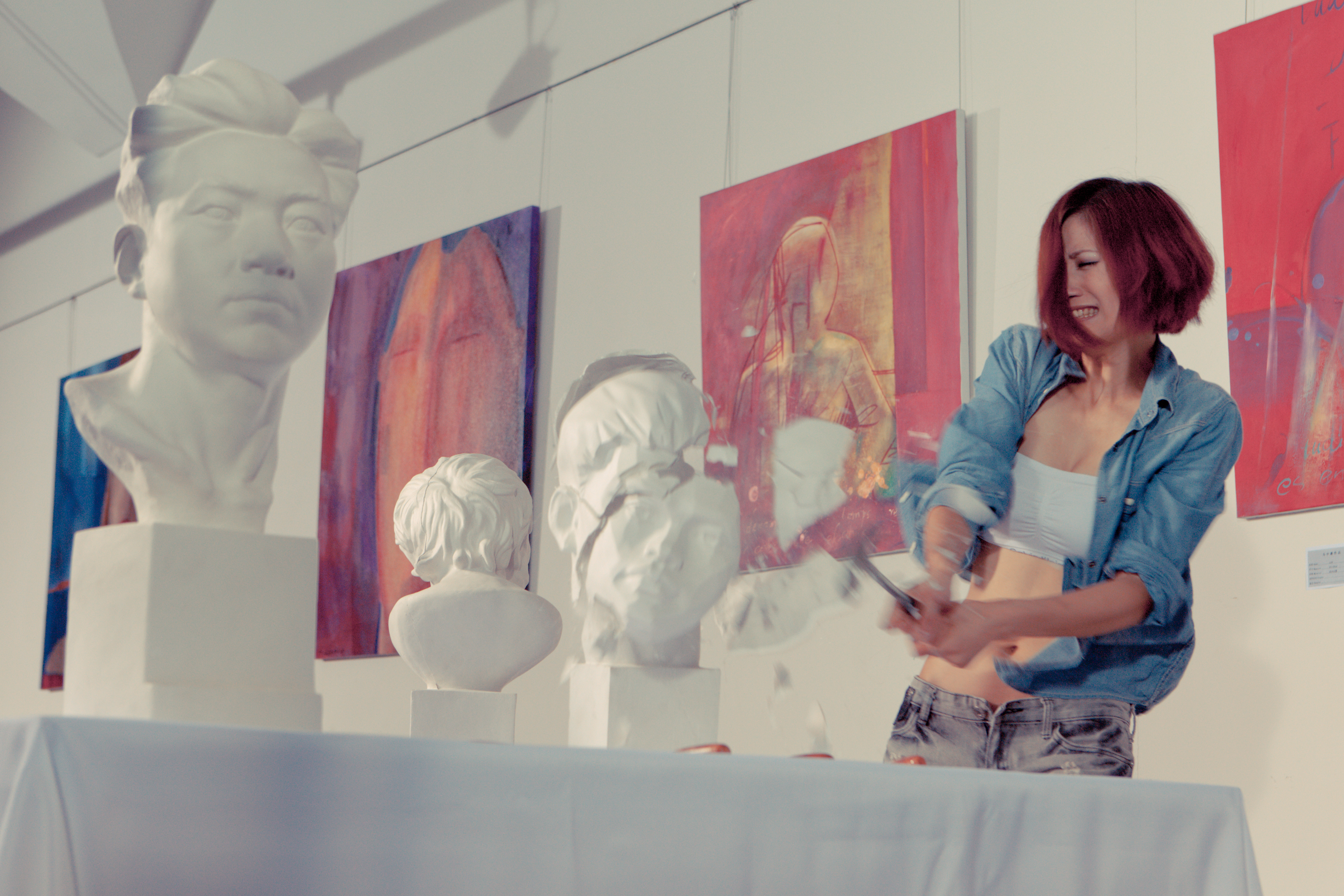
A model smashing a head sculpture with a hammer

Some artists sabotage their own work out of insecurity, neurosis, or to start over. In 1970, John Baldessari and five other artists burned all the paintings Baldessari had created between 1953 and 1966 in a bonfire.

The 2018 artwork Love Is in the Bin by Banksy was designed with a shredder hidden in the frame, activated upon the painting's sale at auction to destroy the lower half of the artwork.

== "Sacrifice" of ritual artwork ==
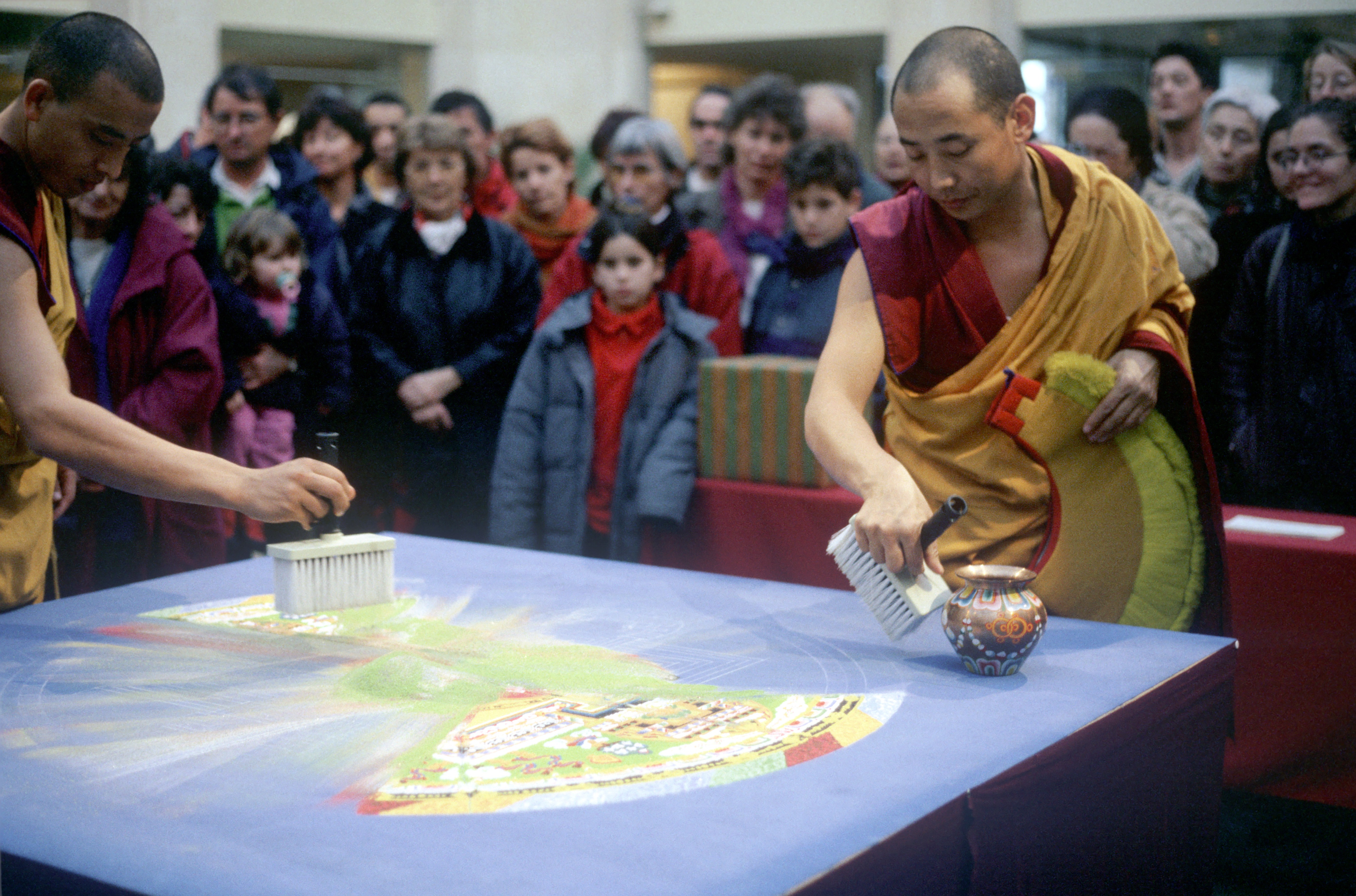
Tibetan sand mandala being ritually swept up by monks

Some artwork is made to be intentionally sacrificed in a ceremonial or ritual process, often by burning.

- Tibetan sand mandalas are meticulously constructed to visualize Buddhist cosmology, before being swept up and bottled or otherwise ritually disposed
- Burning Man is an arts festival in the Nevada desert which serves as a psychedelic community. On the last day of the festival, a giant wooden mannequin is ritually burned.
- The Semana Santa (Easter week) festival in Antigua, Guatemala, where designs made out of flowers and colored sawdust are created in the street prior to being trampled by a religious parade.
- The burning of Zozobra during Fiestas de Santa Fe in Santa Fe, New Mexico, usually during the second week of September.
- The burning of falles in Valencia, Spain.
- Radoslav Rochallyi claims that his creative process is a ritual of creation and destruction. He claims that for him, the new replaces the old as passionately and carelessly as the old is destroyed.

== Iconoclasm ==
Other works of art may be destroyed without the consent of the original artist or of the local community. In other instances, works of art may be destroyed by a local authority against the wishes of the outside community. Examples of this include the removal of Diego Rivera's 1934 Man at the Crossroads mural from the Rockefeller Center and the destruction of the Buddhas of Bamyan statues by the Taliban government.

- Artworks destroyed in the September 11 attacks in the United States included a painted wood relief by Louise Nevelson, a painting from Roy Lichtenstein's Entablature series and a Joan Miró tapestry. The total value of artwork lost in the September 11 attacks is said to have been in excess of $100 million
- In 2017, a terror suspect attacked guards of the Louvre with machetes and was found carrying "bombs of aerosol paint" intended to "disfigure the masterpieces of the [Louvre] museum."
- In 2023, a bronze statue of Robert E. Lee, which was begun by Henry Shrady in 1917 and completed by Leo Lentelli in 1924, was melted by the Jefferson School African American Heritage Center.

== See also ==
- Art intervention
- Art vandalism
- Digital preservation
- Flag desecration
- Iconoclasm
- List of World Heritage in Danger
- Lost artworks
- List of destroyed heritage

== Bibliography ==
- Gunnar Schmidt: Klavierzerstörungen in Kunst und Popkultur. Reimer Verlag, Berlin 2012. ISBN 978-3-496-01475-1.
- Anne-Marie O'Connor: The Lady in Gold, the Extraordinary Tale of Gustav Klimt's Masterpiece, Portrait of Adele Bloch-Bauer ISBN 0-307-26564-1
