= Ecce Homo (García Martínez and Giménez) =

Spanish fresco with a viral restoration

Coordinates: 41°51′16.83″N 1°34′31.52″W

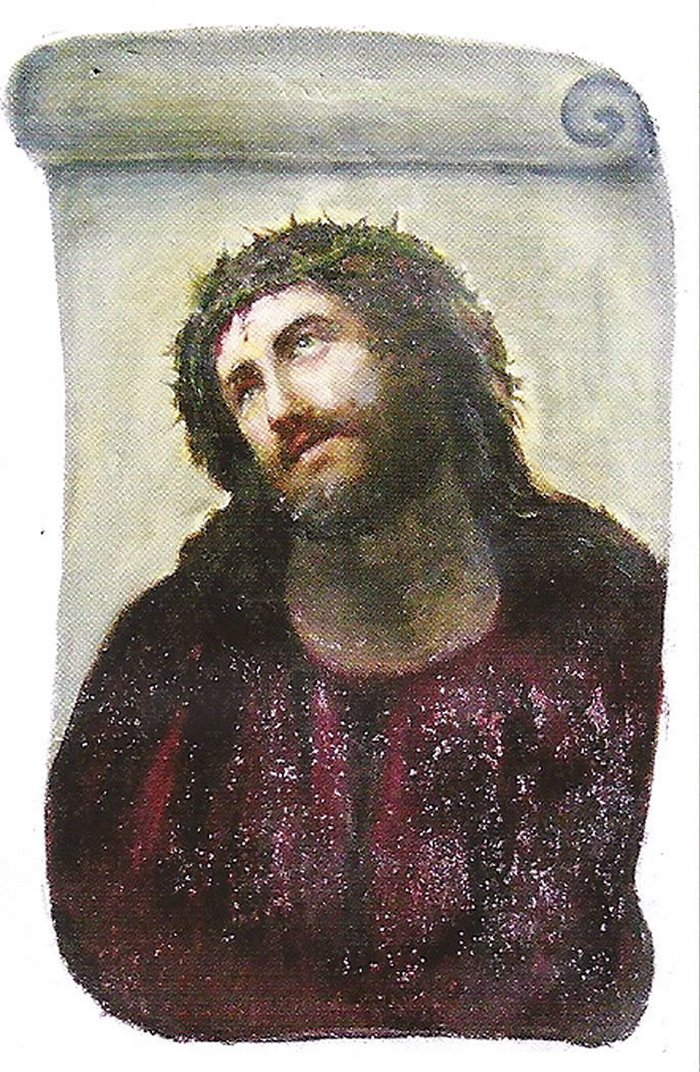
- Ecce Homo before the restoration attempt
- Artists: Elías García Martínez, Cecilia Giménez (restoration attempt)
- Type: Fresco
- Dimensions: 50 cm × 40 cm (20 in × 16 in)
- Location: Sanctuary of Mercy church, Borja, Zaragoza, Spain
- Owner: Diocese of Tarazona

The Ecce Homo (Latin: "Behold the Man") in the Sanctuary of Mercy church (Santuario de Misericordia) in Borja, Spain, is a fresco painted circa 1930 by the Spanish painter Elías García Martínez that depicts Jesus crowned with thorns, a traditional subject in Catholic art.

While press accounts state the original painting was unremarkable, the fresco became an international sensation after Cecilia Giménez, an 81-year-old amateur artist and resident of Borja, began an effort to restore the fresco in 2012. Her partial attempt at restoration was mocked in the media and characterized as making the image appear like a monkey. For this reason, it is sometimes referred to as Ecce Mono (roughly Behold the Monkey, "mono" being Spanish for "monkey") or Monkey Christ.

Giménez, who died in 2025, said the state of the fresco reflected preliminary steps in an approved restoration process she had intended to continue. Giménez suffered from the public shaming she received when the incident was widely publicized. The event attracted tourists to Borja and became a source of economic benefit to the community. The fresco has not been altered since Giménez modified it.

== Original fresco ==
García Martínez, the original artist, was a professor at the School of Art of Zaragoza and donated the painting to the village where he had spent his holidays, painting it on the wall of the church around 1930. He commented that "this is the result of two hours of devotion to the Virgin of Mercy". His descendants still live in Zaragoza and were aware that the painting had deteriorated. García Martínez's granddaughter had made a donation toward its restoration shortly before they discovered that the work had been altered in an attempt to restore it.

== Restoration effort and internet phenomenon ==
Cecilia Giménez's 2012 attempted partial restoration of the fresco

Authorities in Borja said they had suspected vandalism at first, but then determined that the alterations had been made by a parishioner, Cecilia Giménez (16 June 1931 – 29 December 2025), who was 81 years old at the time. She said on Spanish national television that she started to restore the fresco because she was upset that parts of it had flaked off due to excessive moisture on the church's walls. Giménez defended herself, saying she could not understand the uproar because she had worked in broad daylight and had tried to salvage the fresco with the approval of the local clergyman. She told Spanish television, "The priest knew it. I've never tried to do anything hidden."

Giménez said that the attempted restoration was actually an incomplete work in progress. "I left it to dry and went on holiday for two weeks, thinking I would finish the restoration when I returned", she said. "When I came back, everybody in the world had heard about Ecce Homo. The way people reacted still hurts me, because I wasn't finished with the restoration." She argued, "I still think about how if I hadn't gone on holiday, none of this would have ever happened."

News of the painting spread around the globe in August 2012 (the silly season) on mainstream and social media, which promptly rose to the status of an internet phenomenon. BBC Europe correspondent Christian Fraser said that the result resembled a "crayon sketch of a very hairy monkey in an ill-fitting tunic". The restored version has been jokingly dubbed Ecce Mono ('Behold the Monkey' (Note: Ecce is Latin for 'behold', whereas mono is Spanish for 'monkey', while in Latin, it would be simius.)) in an "online rush of global hilarity", and the incident was compared to the plot of the 1997 film Bean. Because of the negative attention, the priest of the church, Father Florencio Garces, thought the painting should be covered up. The family of the original artist García Martínez threatened legal action. The notoriety caused Giménez humiliation, anxiety and panic, during which period she refused to eat and lost six kilograms.

Giménez later warmed to the attention brought by her restoration attempt. Speaking publicly in 2015, she said, "everyone here sees what I did in a different light. The restoration has put Borja on the world map, meaning I've done something for my village that nobody else was able to do. So many people have come here — and to our beautiful church — to see the painting... they tell me more than 130,000 people."

== Cultural legacy ==
The fresco and its attempted restoration resulted in public dialogues about art, as well as sacred and secular themes. A Forbes commentator suggested that the "inept restoration" represented "one woman's vision of her savior, uncompromised by schooling". In September 2012, the artistic group Wallpeople presented hundreds of reworked versions of the new image on a wall near the Centre de Cultura Contemporània de Barcelona. An organizer commented that "Cecilia has created a pop icon".

Spanish actress Assumpta Serna co-produced with Wildcard UK a documentary called Fresco Fiasco and acted in the movie Behold the Monkey, two films about the restoration. Both projects were seen in February 2016 on the Sky Arts network in the UK.

A comic opera about the affair, named Monkey Christ, opened in Las Vegas in 2023.

== Tourist success and revenue ==
The interest from tourists was such that the church began charging a fee to see the restored fresco. In the year following the failed restoration, tourist activity generated 40,000 visits and more than €50,000 for a local charity. Giménez sought a share of the royalties; her lawyer said that she wanted her share of the profits to help muscular dystrophy charities because her son suffers from the condition. The mayor was able to mend the dispute between the families of Martínez and Giménez. According to a 2013 agreement, Giménez receives 49% of all merchandising profit resulting from her work.

By 2016, the number of tourists visiting the town had increased from 6,000 to 57,000, though by 2026 it had settled to between 15,000 to 20,000. In addition to spending money with local businesses, visitors have donated some €50,000 to the church. On 16 March 2016, an interpretation centre dedicated to the artwork was opened in Borja.

In 2022 it was reported that the €3 tickets generated over €40,000 revenue per year, money that was used for the maintenance of the church, to pay the salary of two guides, and to support several low-income people in the town's elderly home.

Cecilia Giménez died on 29 December 2025, aged 94.

== See also ==
- Behold the Man, La Ópera de Cecilia
- Accidental damage of art
- Outsider art
