= Elías García Martínez =

Spanish painter (1858–1934)

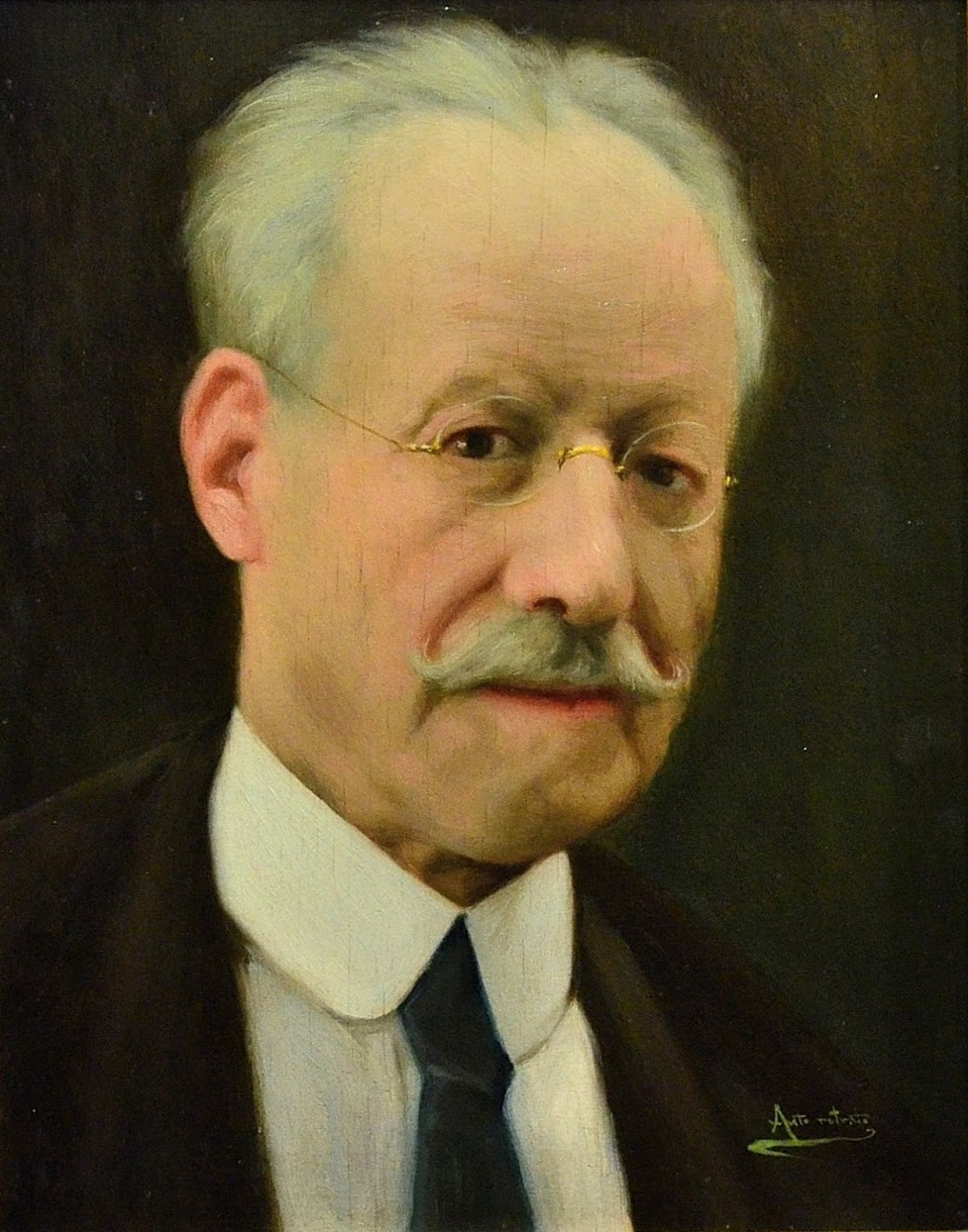
- Self-portrait (1920)
- Born: 20 July 1858; Requena, Valencia, Spain
- Died: 1 August 1934 (aged 76); Utiel, Valencia, Spain
- Known for: Painting
- Spouse: Juliana Condoy Tello

Elías García Martínez (20 July 1858 – 1 August 1934) was a Spanish painter.

== Biography ==
García Martínez was born in Requena, where he started his artistic career. He studied at the Real Academia de Bellas Artes de San Carlos de Valencia and in Barcelona. He moved to Zaragoza, where he married Juliana Condoy Tello. In 1894, he started to work as an assistant professor in the Escuela Provincial de Bellas Artes de Zaragoza, where he taught the course of ornamental drawing and portrait painting until his retirement in 1929. He also gave lectures as professor of the Instituto de Segunda Enseñanza de Zaragoza. His work as a portraitist is not greatly appreciated by critics as he had not incorporated the innovations of modernity. He died in Utiel, aged 76.

== Ecce Homo ==
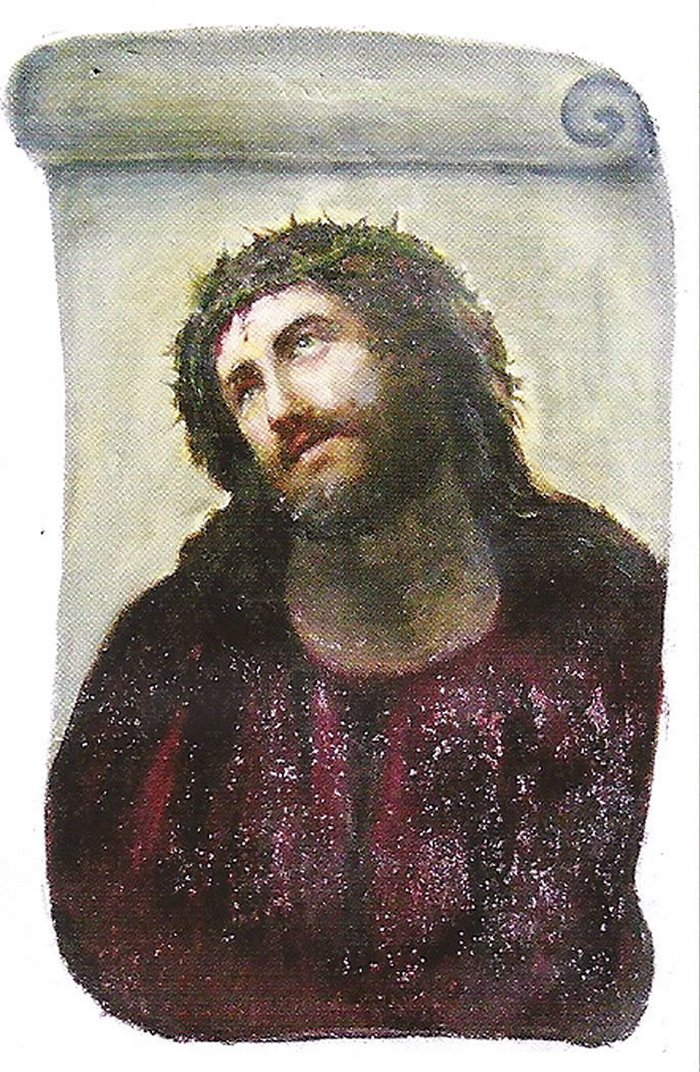
Ecce Homo before the attempted restoration

One of the frescos painted circa 1930 by García Martínez in the Santuario de Misericordia of Borja (Zaragoza), his Ecce Homo accidentally rose to international attention in August 2012 when it was altered in good faith by a local 81-year-old woman, Cecilia Giménez, who had wished to restore the painting which had deteriorated from humidity. Giménez insisted she had permission from the local priest to perform the work. As she lacked any kind of professional skill or experience, her attempt resulted in major damage to the painting, although the result enjoyed ironic fame and popularity.
