= Vandalism of art =

Intentional damage of an artwork

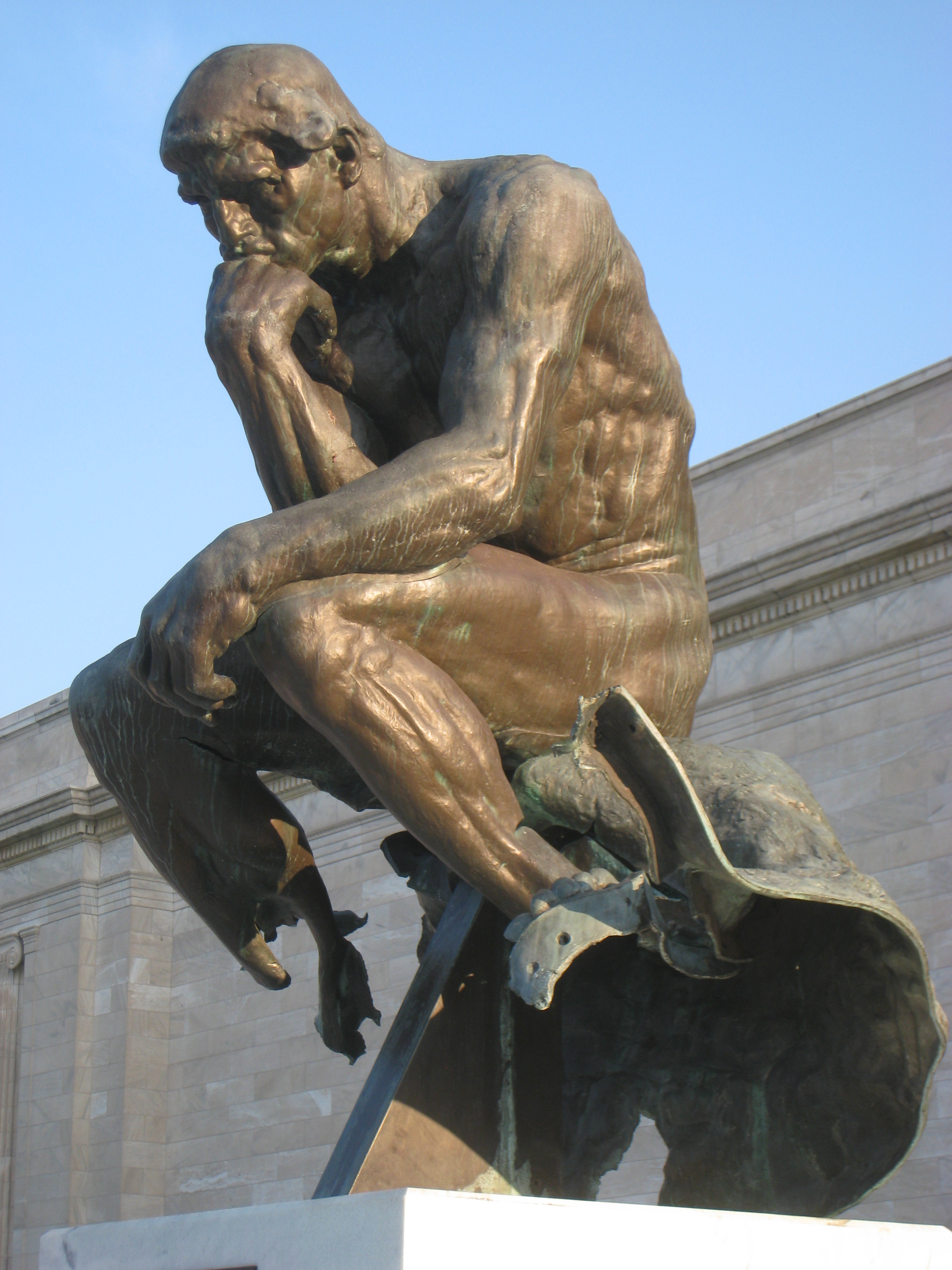
Cast of Rodin's The Thinker (at the Cleveland Museum of Art, Cleveland, Ohio, US) that was intentionally damaged by a pipe bomb in 1970

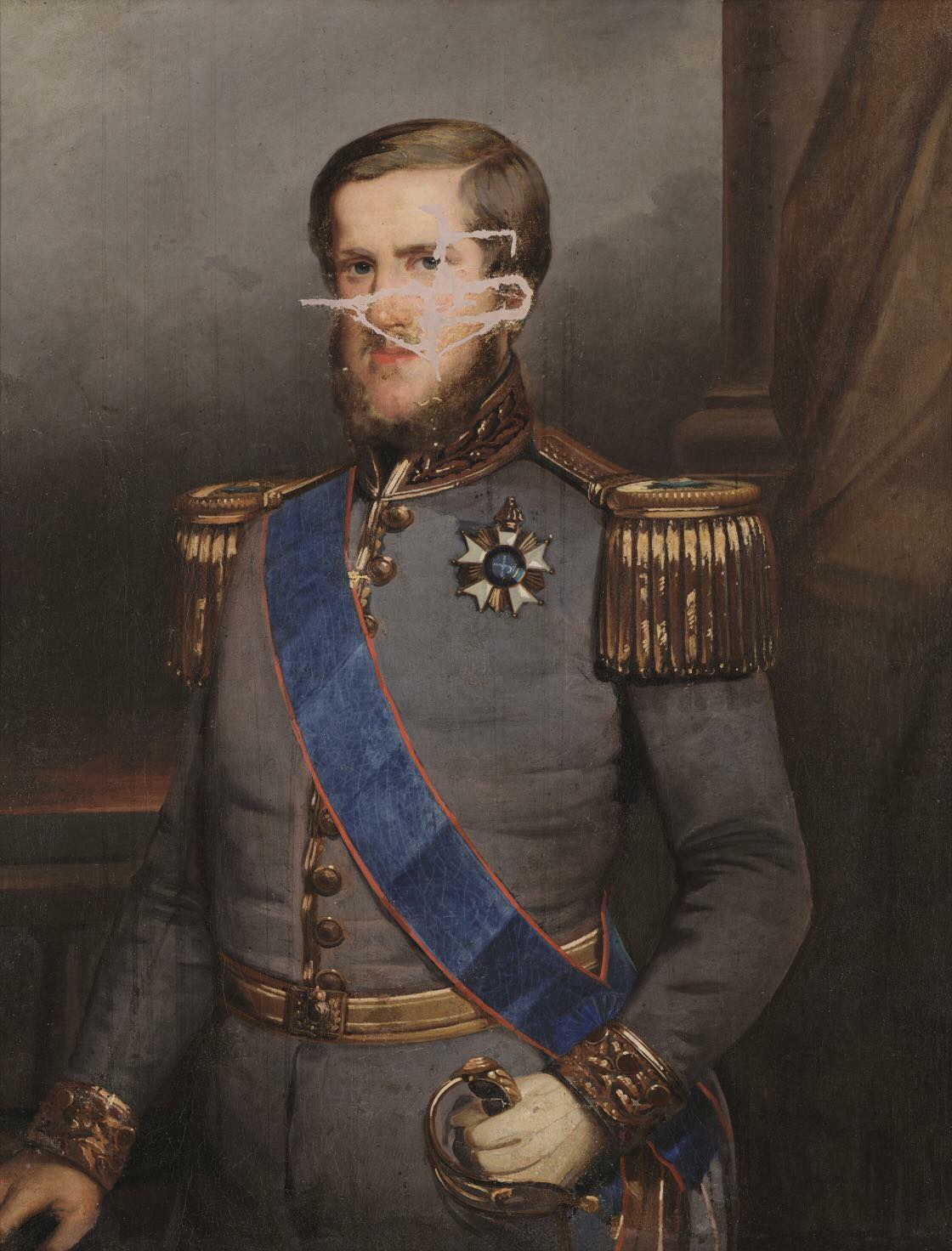
A portrait of Emperor Pedro II of Brazil has been damaged in a sword attack during the military coup d'etat of 1889 that abolished the monarchy. The damaged parts of the painting were left unrestored, in order to maintain the historical record.

Vandalism of art is intentional damage of an artwork. The object, usually exhibited in public, becomes damaged as a result of the act, and remains in place right after the act. This may distinguish it from art destruction and iconoclasm, where it may be wholly destroyed and removed, and art theft, or looting.

Numerous acts of vandalism against art exhibits are known and some objects, such as Mona Lisa, Night Watch, Pietà and The Little Mermaid, have been intentionally damaged several times. Many vandals have been diagnosed with mental disorders and some, such as Hans-Joachim Bohlmann, had a history of attacking artworks. Other vandals have acted out of political protest. Smaller acts of vandalism may leave a minor scratch, a piece of chewing gum, a pencil mark and so on, and usually escape publicity. More visible acts of vandalism are often premeditated, as the tool of destruction – a knife, paint, acid, soup, or hammer – is intentionally brought to the scene. In most cases, the artworks have been restored. Restorations are often costly and time-consuming, and in some cases are followed by the artwork becoming shielded against future attacks.

== History of the term ==
The term vandalism was coined in 1794 by Henri Grégoire, bishop of Blois, to describe the destruction of artwork following the French Revolution. The term originated from the Sack of Rome in 455 by the East Germanic tribe of Vandals, which resulted in destruction of numerous artworks, and was quickly adopted across Europe.

== Methods ==
=== Acid and paint ===
In 1880, exhibits of the Russian painter Vasily Vereshchagin in Vienna caused the opposition of the Catholic Church, which culminated in an attack on two paintings, Holy family (Russian: Святое семейство) and Resurrection (Russian: Воскресение Христово). A monk splashed enough acid on the paintings to virtually destroy them.

In 1974, art dealer Tony Shafrazi wrote "KILL LIES ALL" with red spray paint over the work Guernica by Pablo Picasso. Shafrazi was ostensibly protesting Richard Nixon's pardon of William Calley for the latter's actions during the My Lai massacre. The paint was removed with relative ease from the varnished surface.

On 15 June 1985, Rembrandt's mid-17th-century painting Danaë was attacked in the Hermitage Museum in Russia. A man, later judged insane, first threw sulfuric acid on the canvas and then cut it twice with a knife. The entire central part of the composition was virtually destroyed. The restoration took 12 years, between 1985 and 1997; since then, the painting has been protected with an armored glass.

In 1997, Alexander Brener painted a green dollar sign on Kazimir Malevich's painting Suprematisme. The painting was restored and Brener was sentenced to 5 months in prison. During the court case, he said in his defense:

The cross is a symbol of suffering, the dollar sign a symbol of trade and merchandise ... What I did was not against the painting. I view my act as a dialogue with Malewitz.

On 13 June 2012, Uriel Landeros spray painted a bull and a matador and wrote "Conquista" with black spray paint over the 1929 work Woman in a Red Armchair by Pablo Picasso. He was charged with felony graffiti and criminal mischief and sentenced to two years in prison.

In 2017, a terror suspect attacked guards of the Louvre museum with machetes and was found carrying "bombs of aerosol paint" intended to "disfigure the masterpieces of the museum."

=== Knife ===
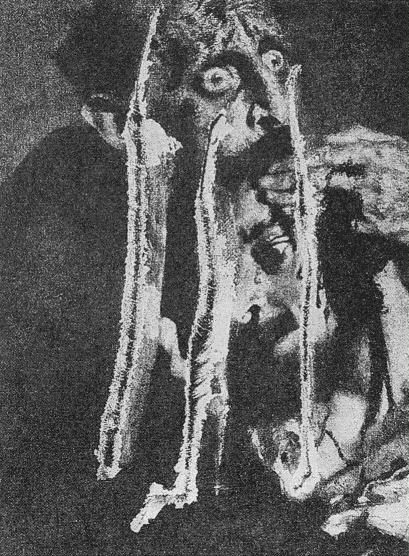
The part of Ivan the Terrible and His Son Ivan damaged in 1913

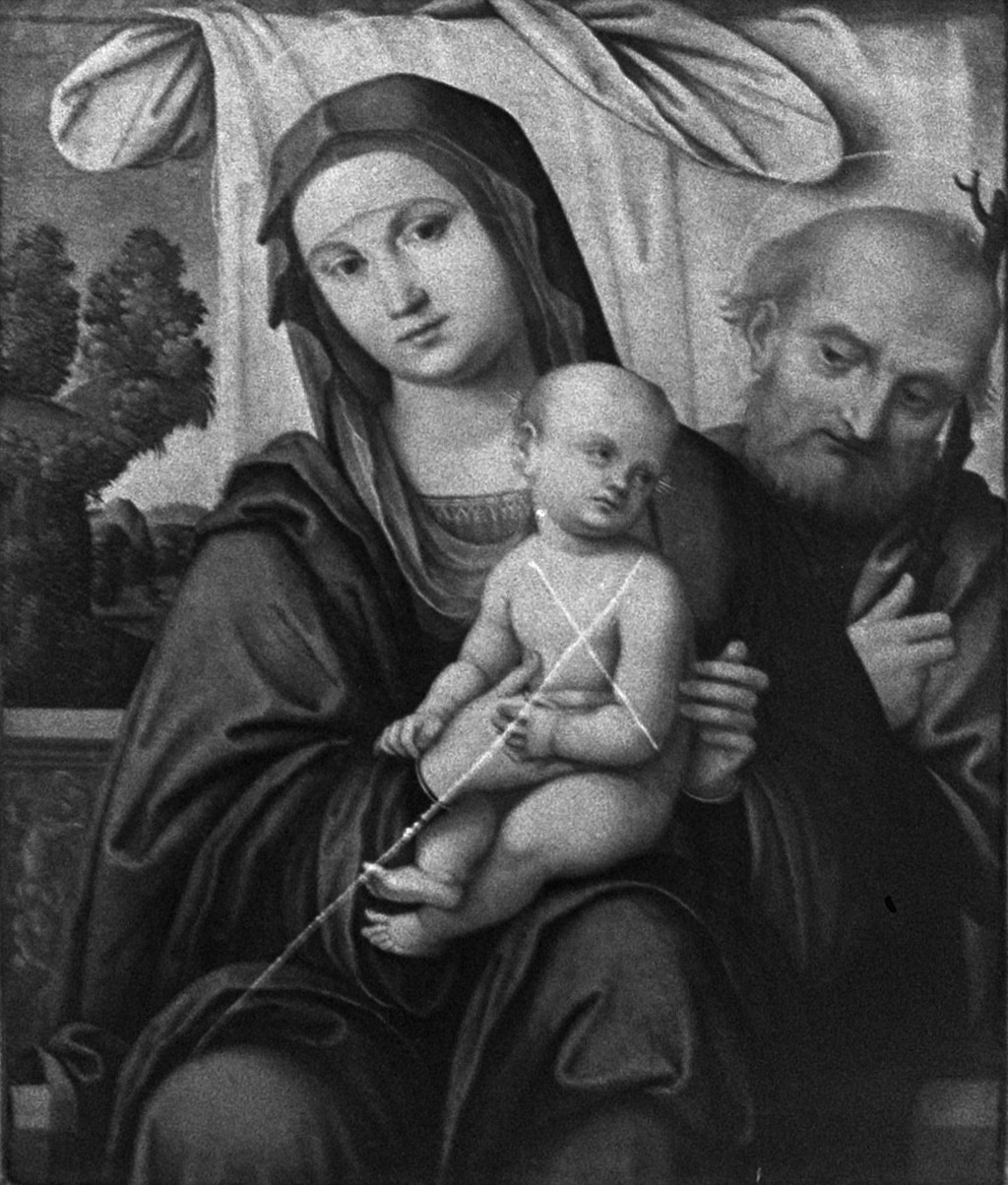
The Holy Family by Lorenzo Costa at the Stedelijk Museum Amsterdam, with central cuts made by an unknown person in 1969

On 16 January 1913, a 29-year-old iconographer Abram Balashev attacked the painting Ivan the Terrible and His Son Ivan by Ilya Repin in the Tretyakov Gallery in Moscow. With three knife blows, he cut through the faces of both Ivans. Balashev was found mentally ill and restricted to a psychiatric hospital. The painting was restored by two leading Russian experts within a week; the work was greatly assisted by the availability of good-quality photographs of the painting.

On 10 March 1914, militant suffragette Mary Richardson walked into the National Gallery in London and attacked Diego Velázquez's painting Rokeby Venus with a meat cleaver. Her action was ostensibly provoked by the arrest of fellow suffragette Emmeline Pankhurst the previous day, although there had been earlier warnings of a planned attack on the collection. Richardson left seven slashes on the painting, all of which have been successfully repaired. Richardson was sentenced to six months imprisonment, the maximum allowed for destruction of an artwork. In a statement to the Women's Social and Political Union shortly afterwards, Richardson explained, "I have tried to destroy the picture of the most beautiful woman in mythological history as a protest against the Government for destroying Mrs. Pankhurst, who is the most beautiful character in modern history". She added in a 1952 interview that she did not like "the way men visitors gaped at it all day long".

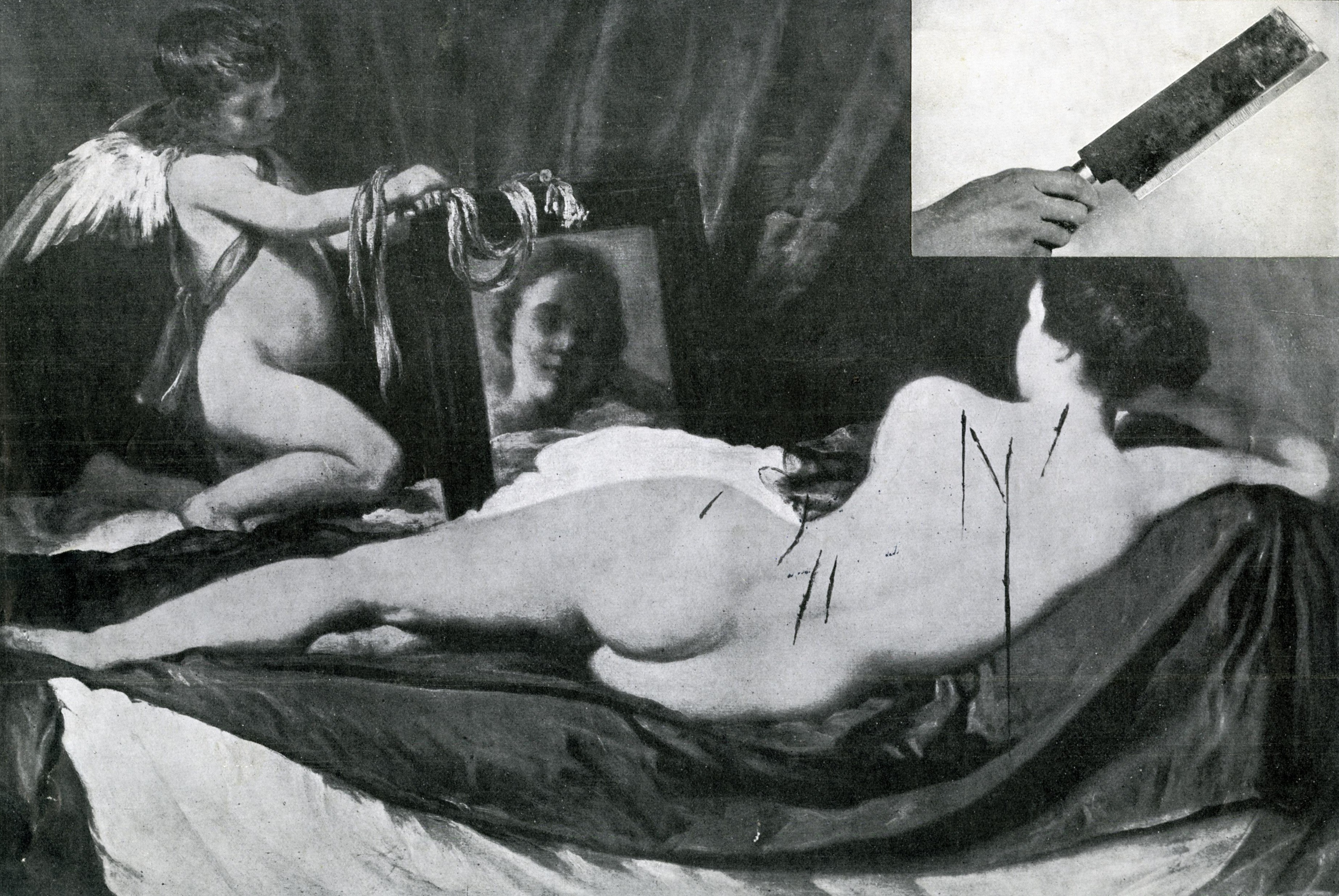
Cuts in the Rokeby Venus made by Mary Richardson in 1914 using the meat cleaver shown in the top right corner

In September 1969, unidentified persons left long scratches in five paintings at the Stedelijk Museum Amsterdam, with most damage inflicted to the Holy Family by Lorenzo Costa.

On 6 April 1978, a 31-year-old Dutch artist, disgruntled over the non-payment of his welfare by the Amsterdam authorities, made three 30–40 cm long cuts in the center of the painting La Berceuse by Vincent van Gogh at the Stedelijk Museum Amsterdam. A few days earlier, a 27-year-old Italian man slashed the painting The Adoration of the Golden Calf by Nicolas Poussin at the National Gallery in London.

In 1986, a man "wishing to take revenge on abstract art" cut with a knife the painting Who's Afraid of Red, Yellow and Blue III by Barnett Newman. The restoration took 5 years and cost $450,000. After serving time in prison, the offender slashed another Newman painting.

A rather unusual case, which likely does not qualify as vandalism, occurred in 1908. An exhibition was set up for May of that year with paintings by Claude Monet, which had already been praised by critics and were estimated at $100,000 (1908 prices). Despite this, Monet decided that he was not satisfied with his work and in a sudden move destroyed all the paintings with a knife and a paint brush.

=== Smashing and shattering ===
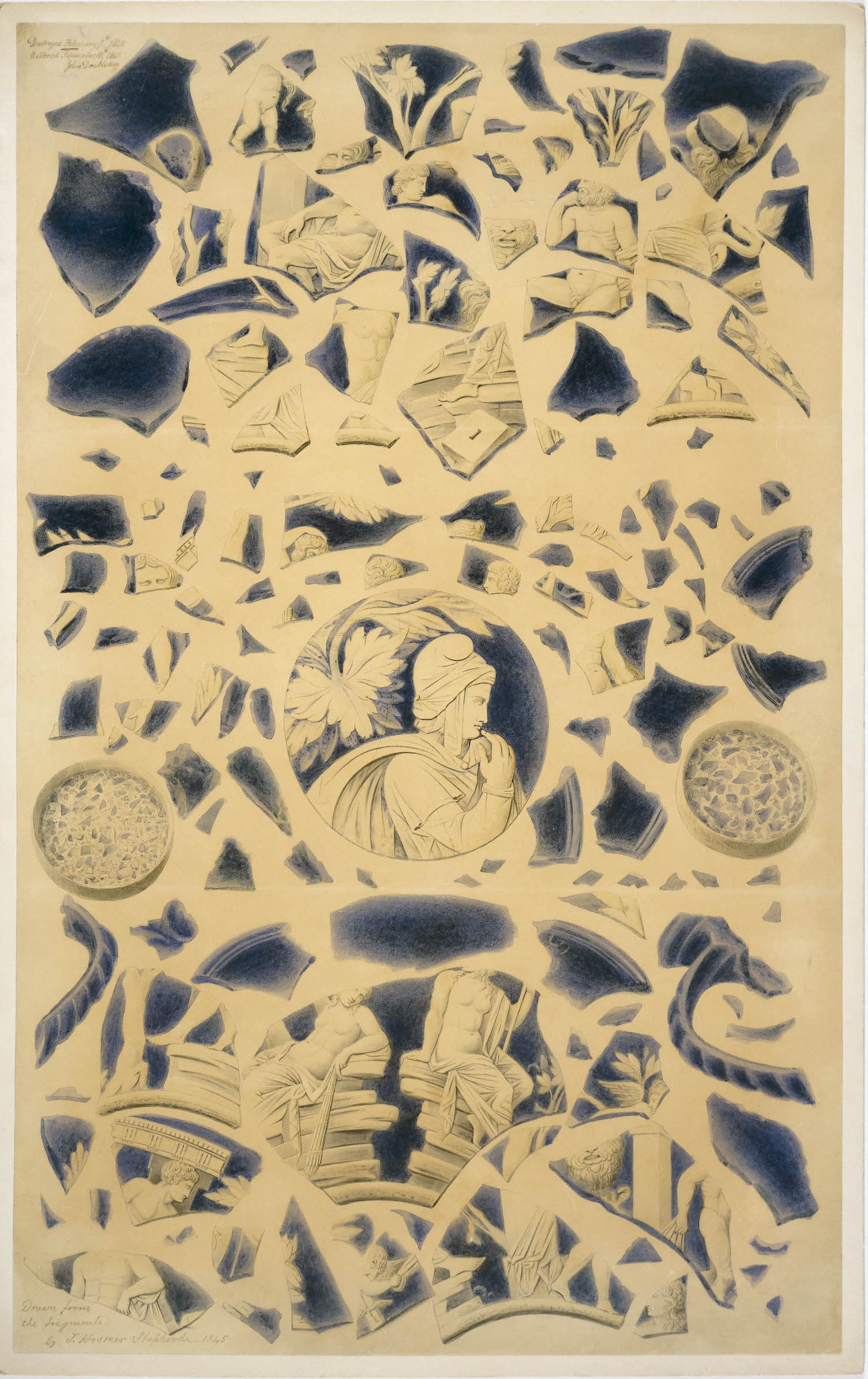
The Portland Vase fragments – watercolour by Thomas H. Shepherd (1845)

On 7 February 1845, the Portland Vase, a Roman cameo glass vase dated to between 5 and 25 BCE, was shattered by a drunken William Lloyd while on display in the British Museum. The vase was pieced together and underwent several further repairs, all not entirely successful. The vase's appearance became satisfactory only after its most recent restoration in 1987.

On 14 September 1991, a "deranged" man attacked the statue David by Michelangelo with a hammer he had concealed under his jacket, damaging the toes of the left foot before being restrained. The samples obtained from that incident helped scientists determine that the marble used was obtained from the Fantiscritti quarries in Miseglia, the central of three small valleys in Carrara. The statue was restored.

La Pietà, another work by Michelangelo, is a 1499 example of Renaissance sculpture housed in St. Peter's Basilica in Vatican City. On 21 May 1972, mentally disturbed geologist Laszlo Toth, aged 33, attacked the statue with a geologist hammer while yelling "I am Jesus Christ!", chipping the Virgin Mary's left eyelid, neck, head, veil and left forearm; the forearm fell on the floor, causing the fingers to break. Most broken pieces were collected by the service people but some were taken by tourists. The sculpture was repaired and is now protected by bulletproof glass. Toth was not charged with a crime, but was found socially dangerous and confined for two years to a psychiatric institution in Italy.

On 17 February 2014, a local Floridian artist, Maximo Caminero, destroyed a colored vase by the Chinese artist Ai Weiwei in protest at the Pérez Art Museum Miami's lack of displays by local artists. The value of the vase was estimated at $1 million. Caminero was subsequently arrested and charged with criminal mischief.

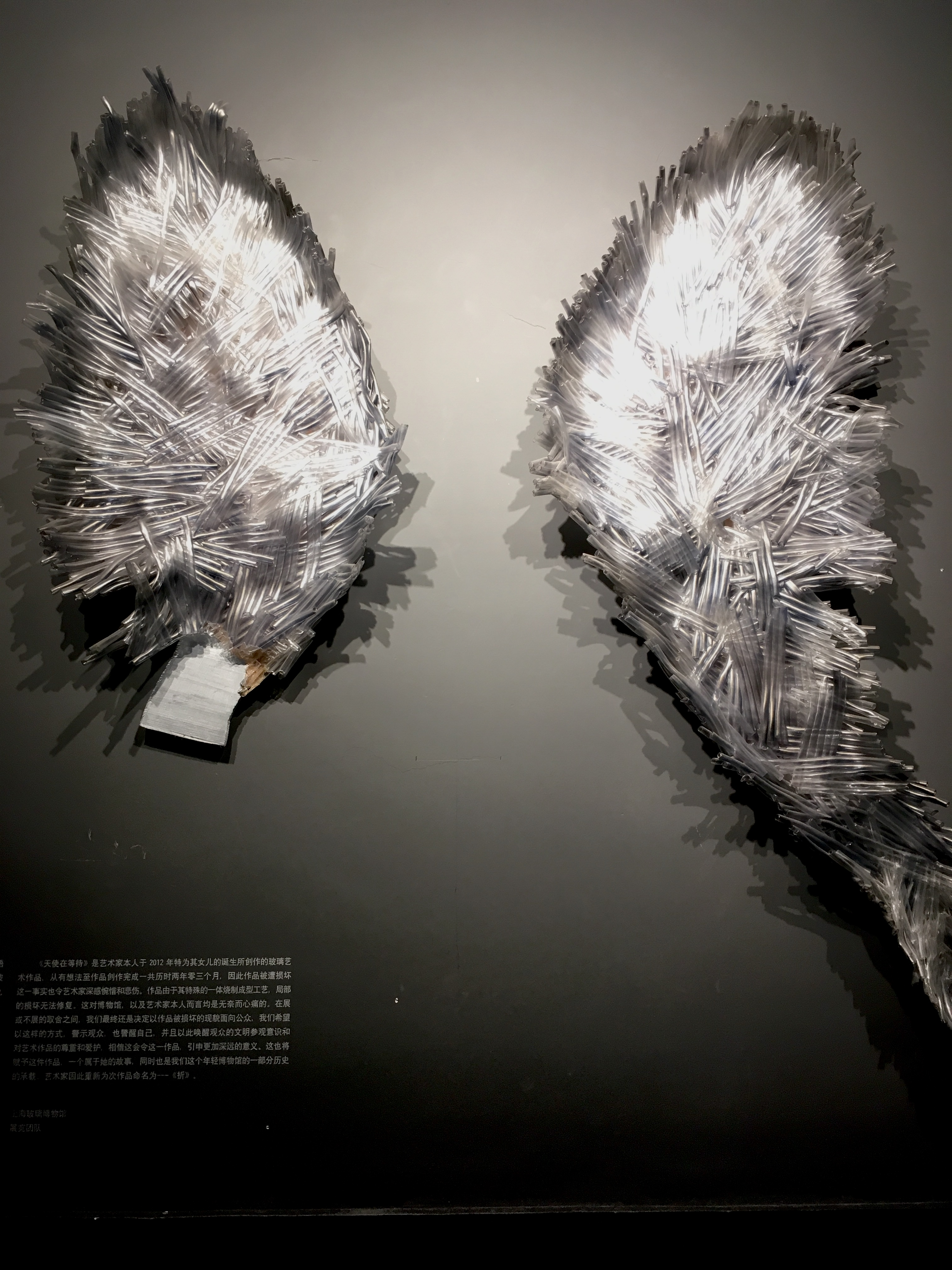
Broken (formerly Angel is Waiting) by Shelly Xue

In 2016, the glass sculpture Angel Is Waiting by Shelly Xue, on display at the Shanghai Museum of Glass, was irreparably damaged after two young boys snuck past the rope barriers and started pulling at the sculpture. Following the incident, the sculpture was renamed to Broken and a television screen was added, playing security footage of the incident on a loop.

On 26 May 2018, Repin's painting Ivan the Terrible and His Son Ivan was vandalized again. A 37-year-old drunken man grabbed a metal stand and repeatedly hit the painting, shattering its protection glass, seriously damaging the original wooden frame, and tearing the central part of the canvas. Fortunately, the most important details of the work, that is, the heads and hands of the tsar and his son, were unharmed.

On 24 September 2024, Ai Weiwei's Porcelain Cube was smashed during the opening of an exhibition in Bologna, Italy. The vandal was identified as Vaclav Pisvejc, a 57-year-old man, who had previously vandalized other works of art, including defacing Urs Fischer's sculpture Big Clay #4 with spray paint, and setting fire to a cloth draped over a replica of Michelangelo's David.

=== Lipstick ===
In 1912, a young woman "Marie" kissed the forehead, eyes, and nose of a portrait by François Boucher in the Louvre. She reportedly wanted to draw attention to herself.

In 1977, 43-year-old Ruth van Herpen kissed a painting by Jo Baer at the Oxford Museum of Modern Art, claiming to try cheering up a "cold" painting. She was ordered by law to pay the restoration costs of $1,260.

In 1998, the painting Bathtub by Andy Warhol, estimated to be worth several hundred thousand dollars, was kissed by a vandal during a party at the museum. Because Warhol had not varnished the painting, conservators at the Carnegie Museum of Art were concerned that traditional solvents would cause the lipstick to soak into the painting and make things worse.

On 19 July 2007, police arrested artist Rindy Sam after she kissed the all-white canvas of Phaedrus by Cy Twombly, leaving a red lipstick mark. The artwork, which was worth an estimated $2,830,000, was on display at the Museum of Contemporary Art in Avignon, France. First attempts to remove the mark using about 30 various chemicals were unsuccessful. Sam was tried in a court in Avignon for "voluntary degradation of a work of art". She defended herself by saying to the court: "It was just a kiss, a loving gesture. I kissed it without thinking; I thought the artist would understand... It was an artistic act provoked by the power of Art". In November 2007, Sam was convicted and ordered to pay €1,000 to the painting's owner, €500 to the Avignon gallery that showed it, and €1 to the painter. In June 2009, she was ordered to pay €18,840 to the Yvon Lambert gallery.

The prevalence of lipstick-related incidents of vandalism has led some museums to require guests to remove their makeup before entering the museum, although this practice has remained highly controversial.

=== Firearms ===
In July 1987, a man named Robert Cambridge entered the National Gallery in London with a sawed-off shotgun concealed under his coat. He then shot the drawing The Virgin and Child with St Anne and St John the Baptist by Leonardo da Vinci from a distance of about 2 meters (7 feet). The pellets did not penetrate the protective glass, but shattered it, and the splinters caused significant damage to the artwork. Cambridge told the police that he wanted to express his disgust with "political, social and economic conditions in Britain"; he was placed in a mental institution. The restoration of the drawing took more than a year to complete.

=== Other tools ===
In 1996, Canadian multi-media artist Jubal Brown vandalised Raoul Dufy's Harbor at le Havre in the Art Gallery of Ontario in Toronto and Piet Mondrian's Composition With Red and Blue in the Museum of Modern Art in New York by deliberately vomiting food of the colors red and blue, respectively, on them. He intended to vomit on a third painting with food of the color yellow, but he did not manage to do so.

In January 1998, vandals poked holes in two paintings by Henri Matisse, Pianist with Checkers Players (1924) and The Japanese Woman (1901), exhibited in the Capitoline Museums. The holes were mended in a few days.

In January 2004, the Israeli ambassador to Sweden Zvi Mazel tried to destroy the artwork Snow White and The Madness of Truth by unplugging lights and throwing one of them into a pool causing a short circuit.

On 24 February 2006, a 12-year-old boy stuck chewing gum to $1.5 million abstract painting The Bay by Helen Frankenthaler, displayed at the Detroit Institute of Arts. The museum's conservation lab successfully cleaned and restored the painting, which was put back on display in late June 2006.

In 2007, the painting The Triumph of David by Ottavio Vannini (1640), exhibited at the Milwaukee Art Museum, was attacked by a 21-year-old man with a history of mental illness. He pulled the painting off the wall, stomping on it several times. The man was reportedly disturbed by the image of Goliath's severed head.

In 2007, vandals broke into the Orsay Museum in Paris in the early morning, set off the alarm and damaged the painting Bridge at Argenteuil by Claude Monet. They left a 10-centimeter (4 in) tear in the middle, either with a hand blow or with a sharp object.

In 2012, a 49-year-old man named Andrew Shannon punched a large hole in Claude Monet's Argenteuil Basin with a Single Sailboat, valued at €10 million, while it was being displayed at the National Gallery of Ireland. Despite claiming to have a heart condition, a police investigation revealed that the act was deliberate and he was jailed for five years. After 18 months of restoration work, on 1 July 2014, the painting was re-hung in the gallery, behind protective glass. The restoration saw 7% of the damaged area being lost, in a process that involved sewing microscopic threads back together.

== Repeated vandalism ==
=== Hans-Joachim Bohlmann ===
Hans-Joachim Bohlmann (1937–2009) was a German serial vandal. Between 1977 and 2006, he damaged over 50 paintings worth more than 270 million Deutsche Marks (about 138 million euros) by Rubens, Rembrandt, Dürer and other artists. Bohlmann had a personality disorder and was treated in various psychiatric hospitals since a young age. In most acts, he sprayed paintings with sulfuric acid, targeting faces of the personages.

=== Mona Lisa ===
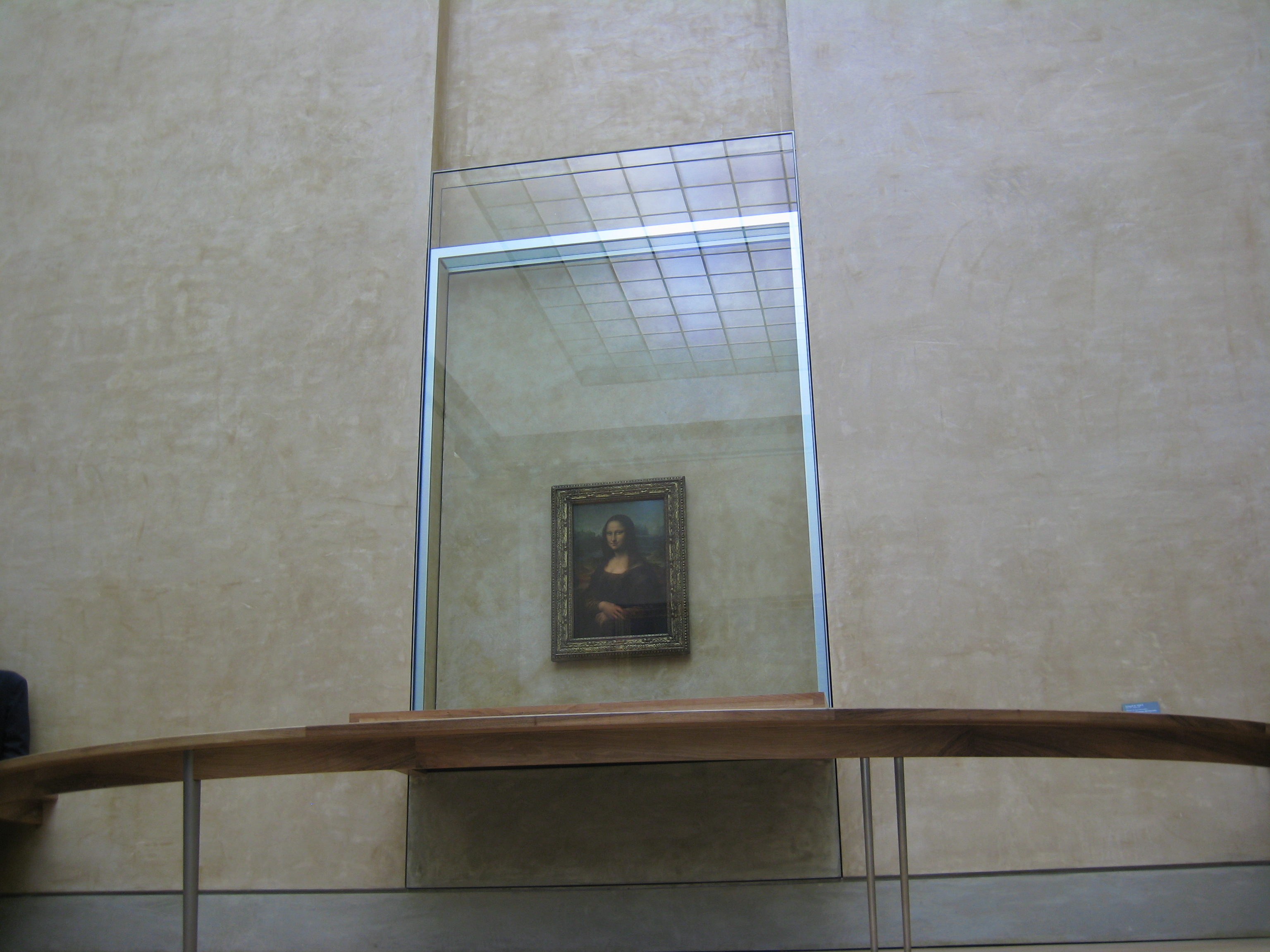
The setup of Mona Lisa exhibit in the Louvre.

Mona Lisa by Leonardo da Vinci has long been attracting vandals and is currently one of the best-protected artworks. On 30 December 1956, a young Bolivian man named Ugo Ungaza Villegas threw a rock at the painting; this resulted in the loss of a speck of pigment near the left elbow, which was later painted over.

The use of bulletproof glass has shielded the Mona Lisa from more recent attacks. In April 1974, a disabled woman, upset by the museum's inaccessibility, sprayed red paint at the painting while it was on display at the Tokyo National Museum. On 2 August 2009, a Russian woman, distraught over being denied French citizenship, threw a terracotta mug or teacup, purchased at the museum, at the painting in the Louvre; the vessel shattered against the glass enclosure. In both cases, the painting was undamaged.

In 2022, a French man disguised as an elderly woman in a wheelchair threw a cake at the glass enclosure before declaring a statement against climate change. The painting was unharmed and the glass was cleaned soon after.

On 28 January 2024, two attackers from the environmentalist group Riposte Alimentaire (Food Retaliation) threw soup at the painting's protective glass to protest the contemporary state of agriculture.

=== Night Watch ===
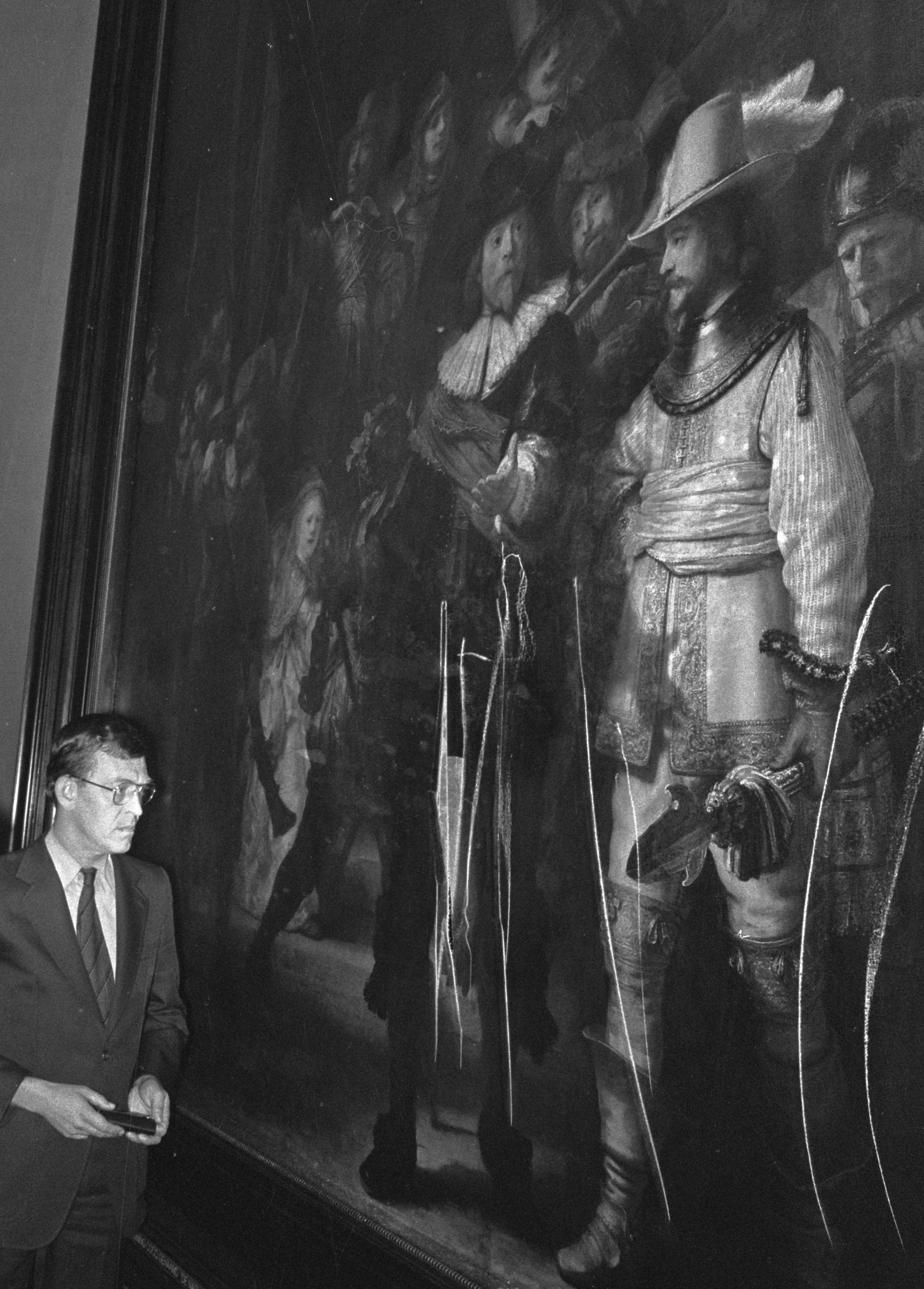
Rembrandt's Night Watch after being cut by William de Rijk in September 1975

Rembrandt's Night Watch (1642) is one of the most popular paintings at the Rijksmuseum in Amsterdam. It is viewed by about 4,000 to 5,000 visitors daily with its value estimated at $925,000 in the 1970s. The painting was vandalized on several occasions. On 13 January 1911, an unemployed navy cook tried to cut it with a knife, but could not cut through the thick varnish on the painting. In 1975, William de Rijk, an unemployed school teacher, cut dozens of zigzag lines in the painting with a knife before he was wrestled by the guards. The day before, de Rijk had been turned away from the museum because he arrived after closing time. After the event, he was identified with a mental disorder; he was sent to a psychiatric hospital and committed suicide there on 21 April 1976. It took six months to restore the painting, and traces of the cuts still remain. In 1990, a man threw acid on the painting. The guards managed to quickly dilute it with water so that it penetrated only the varnish layer, and the painting was restored again.

=== The Little Mermaid ===
The Little Mermaid is a statue of the mermaid from the fairy tale of the same name by Hans Christian Andersen. The statue is located in the harbor of Copenhagen and is an icon and a major tourist attraction of the city. The statue has been damaged and defaced so many times since the mid-1950s that in 2007, Copenhagen officials announced that the statue may be moved further out in the harbor to avoid further vandalism and to prevent tourists from climbing onto it.

The main focus of vandalism for the statue has been decapitation. On 24 April 1964, the statue's head was sawn off and stolen by politically oriented artists of the Situationist movement. The head was never recovered and a new head was produced and attached to the statue. On 6 January 1998, the statue was decapitated again; the culprits were never found, but the head was returned anonymously to a nearby TV station, and re-attached on 4 February.

On the night of 10 September 2003, the statue was knocked off its base with explosives and later found in the harbor's waters. Holes were blasted in the mermaid's wrist and knee.

Paint has been poured on the statue several times, including one episode in 1963 and two in March and May 2007. On 8 March 2006, green paint was poured over the statue and a dildo was attached to its hand.

== As political protest ==
In Ostend, the beach promenade has a 1931 sculptural monument to Leopold II of Belgium, showing Leopold and grateful Ostend fishermen and Congolese. The inscription accompanying the Congolese group notes: "De dank der Congolezen aan Leopold II om hen te hebben bevrijd van de slavernij onder de Arabieren" ("The gratitude of the Congolese to Leopold II for having liberated them from slavery under the Arabs"). In 2004, an activist group cut off the hand of the leftmost Congolese bronze figure, in protest against the atrocities committed in the Congo. The city council decided to keep the statue in its new form, without the hand.

In 2009, the archivist Joel Chung Yin-chai, one of the friends of the late graffiti artist Tsang Tsou-choi, vandalised a number of Tsang's works. This was done in protest of the fact that, despite the Hong Kong Government promising to preserve Tsang's works, the Highways Department had painted over one of them earlier that year.

The Egyptian revolution of 2011, also known as 25 January Revolution, started on 25 January 2011 and spread across Egypt. These riots lead to mass destruction of Egyptian arts, from sculptures to other ancient artifacts.

During the George Floyd protests in 2020, the public sculpture Serve & Protect in Salt Lake City's Public Safety Building was vandalized. The sculpture is of a large pair of hands, representing the service of the police, and the sculpture was vandalised with red paint such that the hands appeared bloodied. This was done to draw attention to police brutality. The paint was washed off the next day.

In 2022, two Just Stop Oil activists threw tomato soup onto the painting Sunflowers by Vincent Van Gogh at the National Gallery in London. The painting was covered with glass, and was unharmed with exception to minor damage to the frame. The pair were arrested and the painting was put back on display later that day.

== Incidents ==
- The Rokeby Venus by Diego Velázquez. Defaced at the National Gallery London, in 1914. On 10 March 1914, Mary Richardson, Suffragette, attacked with a meat cleaver. She surrendered to the guard stating "Yes, I am a suffragette. You can get another picture, but you cannot get a life, as they are killing Mrs Pankhurst" (on hunger strike).
- Michelangelo's Pietá (Piety) at the Vatican. Defaced in 1972 at St. Peter's Basilica in Rome. Defaced by Laszlo Toth who, carrying a hammer, climbed over the rail of the Cappella della Pietà proclaiming "I am Jesus Christ!". He damaged the left forearm, nose and eyelid of the Virgin Mary. He was committed to a mental institution for two years.
- Guernica by Pablo Picasso, Defaced in 1974 at the Museum of Modern Art (MoMA) in New York. Defaced by Tony Shafrazi, a gallery owner, who spray-painted 'LIES ALL LIES' and 'KILL'.
- Danaë by Rembrandt. Defaced in 1985 at the Hermitage Museum in St Petersburg. Defaced by a knife thrust into Danaë's lower belly, and a litre of sulphuric acid thrown over the painting.
- The Virgin and Child with Saint Anne and Saint John the Baptist by Leonardo da Vinci. Defaced in 1987 at the National Gallery London. Defaced by ex-soldier Robert Cambridge who fired a shotgun from seven feet away.
- Piss Christ by Andres Serrano. Attacked twice. National Gallery of Victoria, Australia, 1997 and Collection Lambert museum in Avignon France, 2011.
- Myra by Marcus Harvey. Defaced in September 1997 at the Royal Academy of Arts in London. Two artists, acting separately, defaced the painting of Moors murderer Myra Hindley. Peter Fisher defaced it with red and blue ink, then Jacques Role threw eggs.
- My Bed by Tracey Emin. Defaced in 1999 at the Tate Gallery London. Yuan Cai and Jian Jun Xi jumped on the My Bed exhibit and had a pillow fight.
- The Buddhas of Bamiyan. Destroyed in situ by the Taliban in 2001.
- Margaret Thatcher marble statue by Neil Simmons. Defaced on 3 July 2002 at the Guildhall Art Gallery in London.
- Scallop by Maggi Hambling. Defaced intermittently since 2003 on the Aldeburgh seafront. Defaced with paint numerous times.
- Le Pont d'Argenteuil by Claude Monet. Defaced at the Musée d'Orsay in 2007. Drunken intruders punched a hole in the painting.
- The Thinker by Auguste Rodin. Defaced in August 2011 in Buenos Aires. The sculpture was spray-painted with pink flesh, green hair and a black shoulder tattoo.
- Black on Maroon (1958) by Mark Rothko, Seagram mural series. Defaced in 2012 at Tate Modern London. Defaced by Vladimir Umanets, a Russian-born artist attempting to promote 'yellowism'.
- The Spear by Brett Murray. Defaced in May 2012 at the Goodman Gallery in Johannesburg. Jacob Zuma, President of South Africa, was depicted with exposed penis. It was defaced twice, firstly his face and penis were crossed out with red paint, then a separate defacement smeared black paint.
- Bust of a Woman (1944) by Pablo Picasso. Defaced in December 2019 at the Tate Gallery in London. Defaced by Shakeel Ryan Massey, who used metal padlocks to smash the glass protecting the painting and ripped the canvas, then tore the painting off the wall and threw it onto the floor, telling a security guard that he was carrying a piece of performance art.
- Three Figures by Anna Leporskaya. Defaced in February 2022 at the Boris Yeltsin Presidential Center in Yekaterinburg. The painting was vandalised by a ‘bored’ gallery guard who drew eyes on the figures with a ball-point pen.
- Statue of John Deighton in the Gastown neighbourhood of Vancouver, BC. John Deighton, nicknamed "Gassy Jack", was a 19th-century bar owner whom the neighbourhood takes its name from. Deighton was married to a 12-year-old indigenous girl in 1870. The statue was splattered with red paint in June 2020 by activists growing calls to remove statues honouring colonialist or racist individuals. In February 2022, the statue was toppled by protestors during the 31st annual Women's Memorial March for Missing and Murdered Indigenous Women and Girls.

== See also ==
- Art destruction
- Art forgery
- Art intervention
- Art theft
- Art theft and looting during World War II
- Degenerate art
- Iconoclasm
- Looted art

== Bibliography ==
- Gamboni, Dario (1997). The destruction of art: iconoclasm and vandalism since the French Revolution. Reaktion Books. ISBN 0-948462-94-9.
- Rezzutti, Paulo (2019). D. Pedro II: a história não contada: O último imperador do Novo Mundo revelado por cartas e documentos inéditos (in Portuguese). Leya; 2019. ISBN 978-85-7734-677-6.
