= Lime tree in culture =

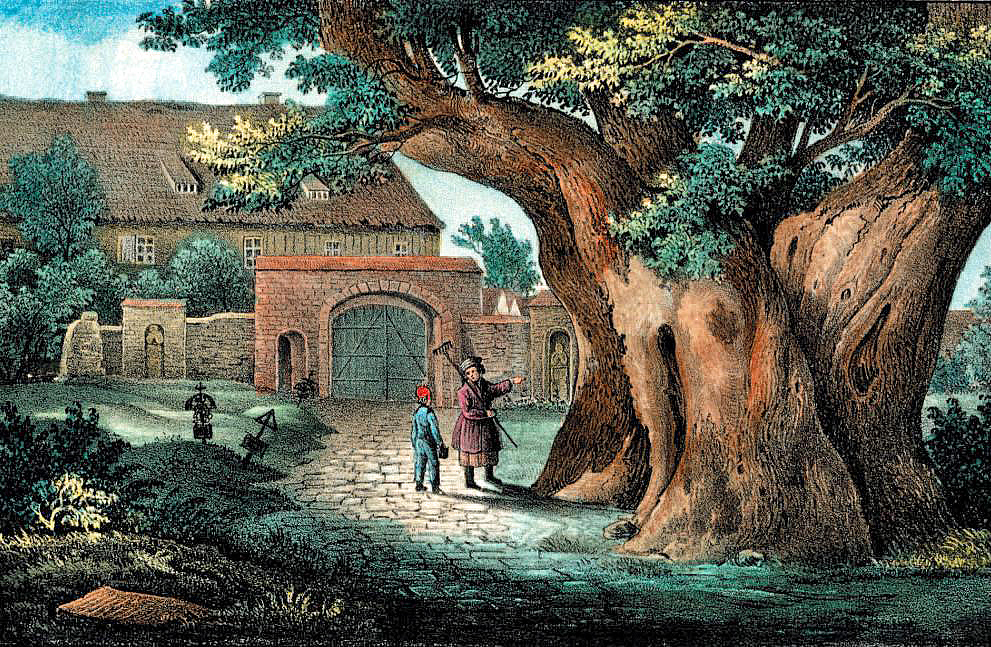
C. W. Arldt: Lime tree in Kaditz, c. 1840

The lime tree, or linden, (Tilia) is important in the mythology, literature, and folklore of a number of cultures.

== Cultural significance ==
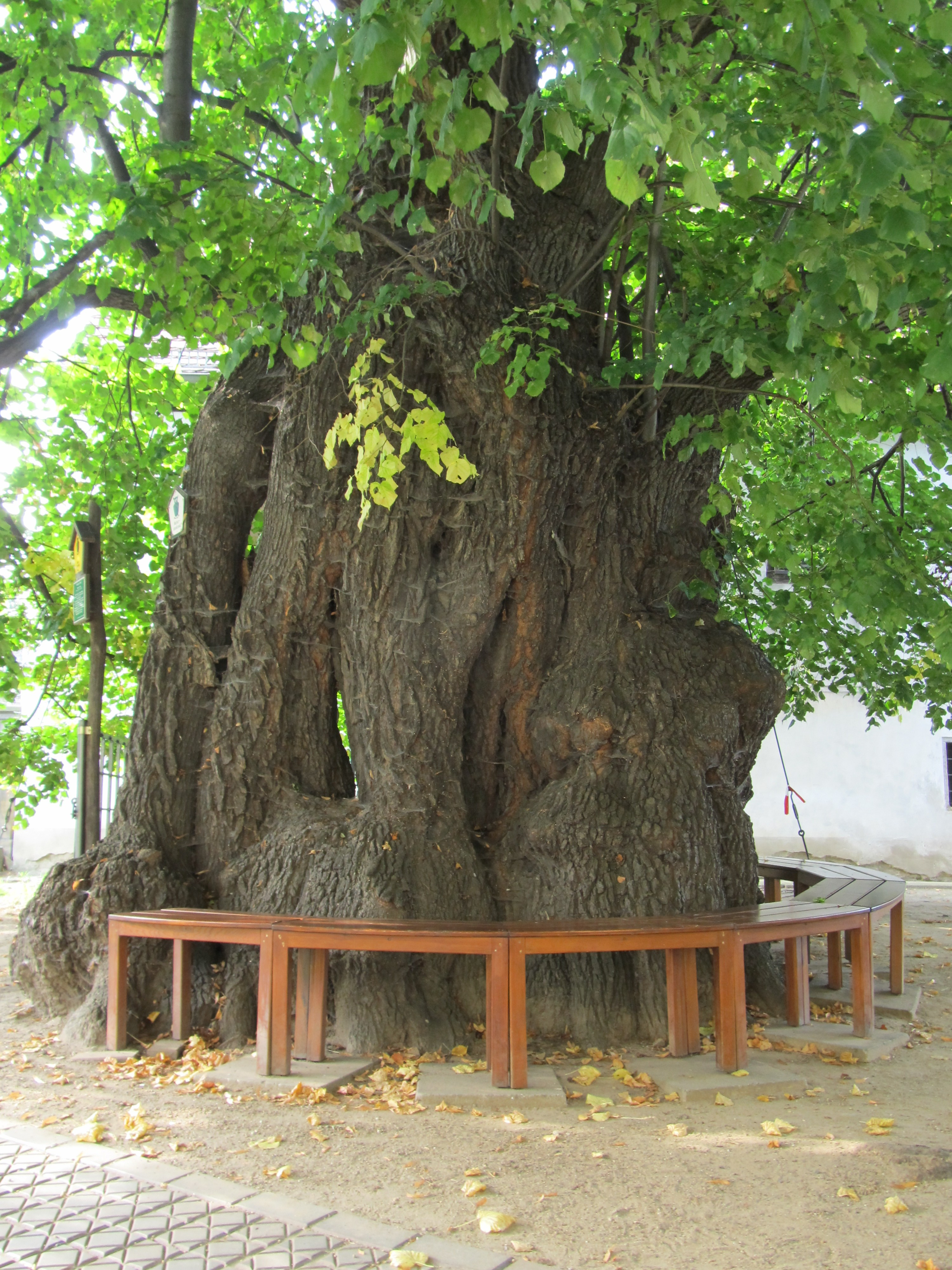
Lime tree in Kaditz

=== Slavic culture ===
In Slavic folklore, the linden (lipa / липа, as called in most Slavic languages, from Proto-Slavic *lipa) was considered a sacred tree. In Poland, the village of Święta Lipka, which literally means "Sacred Lime Tree", has a shrine and is a pilgrimage destination. To this day, the tree is a national emblem of the Czech Republic, Slovakia, Slovenia, and of the Sorbs in Lusatia. Lipa gave name to the native Slavic name for the month of June (Croatian: lipanj) or July (Polish: lipiec; Ukrainian: липень / lypen'). It is also the root for the German city of Leipzig, taken from the Sorbian name lipsk. The former Croatian currency, kuna, consisted of 100 lipa. Lipa was also a proposed name for Slovenian currency in 1990, however the name tolar ultimately prevailed. In the Slavic Orthodox Christian world, limewood was the preferred wood for panel icon painting. The icons by the hand of Andrei Rublev, including the Holy Trinity (Hospitality of Abraham), and The Savior, now in the State Tretyakov Gallery in Moscow, are painted on linden wood. Its wood was chosen for its ability to be sanded very smooth and for its resistance to warping once seasoned. The southern Slovenian village of "Lipica" signifies little Lime tree and has given its name to the Lipizzan horse breed.

=== Baltic mythology ===
In Baltic mythology, there is an important goddess of fate by the name of Laima /laɪma/, whose sacred tree is the lime. Laima's dwelling was a lime-tree, where she made her decisions as a cuckoo. For this reason Lithuanian women prayed and gave sacrifices under lime-trees asking for luck and fertility. They treated lime-trees with respect and talked with them as if they were human beings.

=== Germanic mythology ===
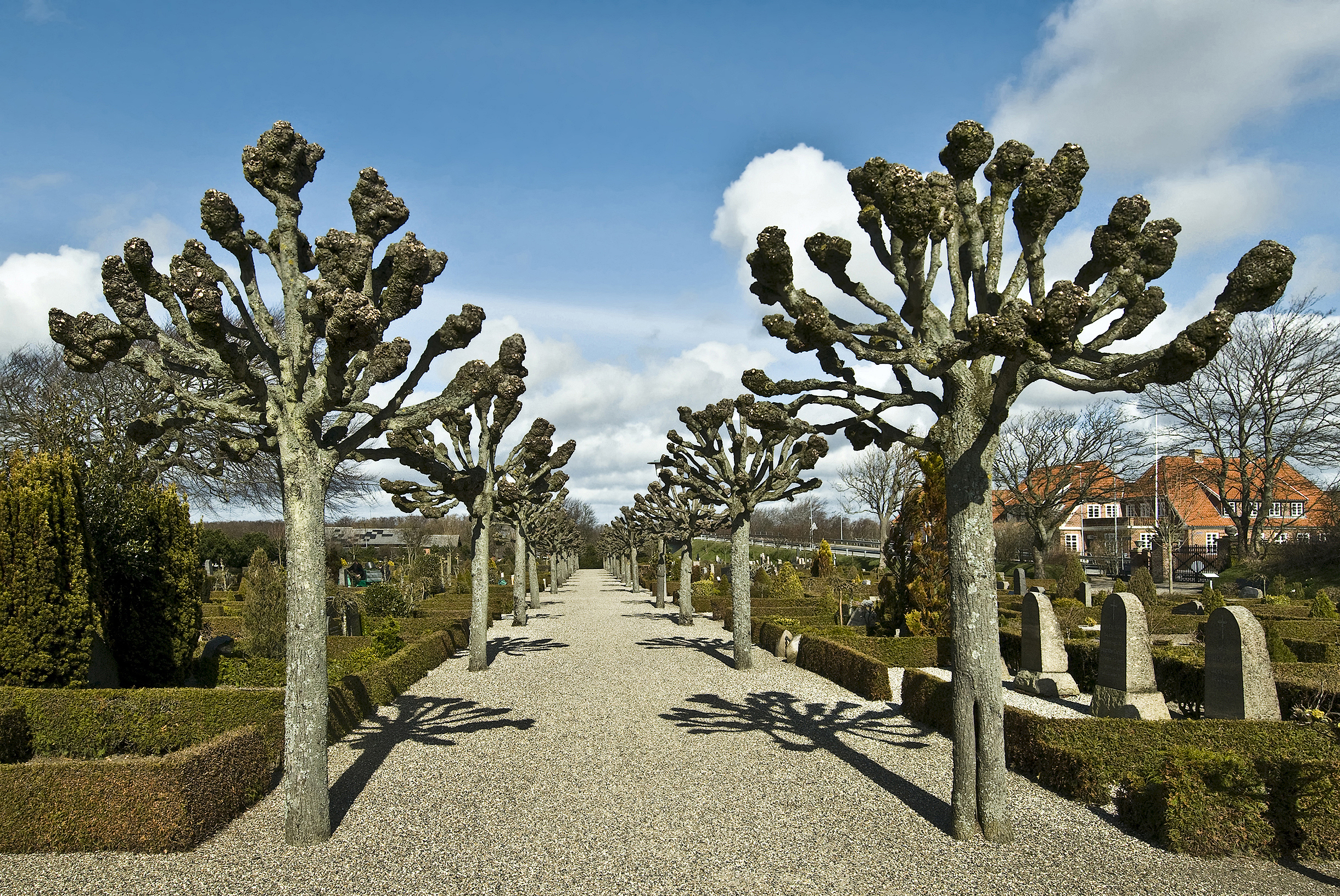
Avenue with linden in the cemetery by Ringkøbing, Jutland, Denmark

The linden was also a highly symbolic and hallowed tree to the Germanic peoples in their native pre-Christian Germanic mythology.

Originally, local communities assembled not only to celebrate and dance under a linden tree, but to hold their judicial thing meetings there in order to restore justice and peace. It was believed that the tree would help unearth the truth. Thus the tree became associated with jurisprudence even after Christianization, such as in the case of the Gerichtslinde, and verdicts in rural Germany were frequently returned sub tilia (Unter der linden) until the Age of Enlightenment.

In the Nibelungenlied, a medieval German work ultimately based on oral tradition recounting events amongst the Germanic tribes in the 5th and 6th centuries, Siegfried gains his invulnerability by bathing in the blood of a dragon. While he did so, a single linden leaf sticks to him, leaving a spot on his body untouched by the blood and he thus has a single point of vulnerability.

The most notable street in Berlin, Germany, is called Unter den Linden, named after the trees lining the avenue. It leads from the center of Berlin to Potsdam, the country residence of the Prussian kings.

In German folklore, the linden tree is the "tree of lovers". The well-known Middle High German poem Under der linden by Walther von der Vogelweide (c. 1200) describes a tryst between a maid and a knight under a linden tree. Commentary on the folk song "Liebesprobe" states, "The linden tree plays a key role in these songs; at eventide, the lovers caress in its shade, it is their favourite tree, and perhaps for the reason that the linden leaf has the shape of a human heart."

Hohenlinden (translated as "High linden") is a community in the upper Bavarian district of Ebersberg in which the Battle of Hohenlinden took place; Thomas Campbell wrote the poem "Hohenlinden" about said battle.

=== Greek mythology ===
Homer, Horace, Virgil, and Pliny mention the linden tree and its virtues. As Ovid tells the old story of Baucis and Philemon, she was changed into a linden and he into an oak when the time came for them both to die. Herodotus says: "The Scythian diviners take also the leaf of the linden tree, which, dividing into three parts, they twine round their fingers; they then unbind it and exercise the art to which they pretend." Philyra, mother of the centaur Chiron, turned into a linden tree after bearing Chiron.

=== In northern China ===
For a long time, in northern China, because there is no Bodhi tree, the sacred tree of Buddhism, and the leaf shape of the "椴樹/Tilia" tree is similar to that of Bodhi tree, it was planted in temples to replace the sacred Bodhi tree. They are also often called Bodhi trees, just like the two Tilia trees next to the 英華殿/Yinghua Dian—the place where the empress dowager, empress and concubines worship Buddha—in the Forbidden City in Beijing, planted by Empress Dowager Li, the biological mother of Wanli Emperor about five hundred years ago. Qianlong Emperor of the Qing dynasty even wrote two poems for them: "菩提树诗/The Poem of the Bodhi Tree (in the Yinghua Dian)" and "菩提树歌/The Song of the Bodhi Tree (in the Yinghua Dian)", and carved them on stone tablets and placed them in the stele pavilion in front of the Yinghua Dian.

=== Scythian mythology ===
Scythian diviners used wood in their rituals, and in particular the Enarei priests used linden bark. The Enarei were androgynous priests for the goddesses Artimpasa and the Snake-headed Goddess. In addition to its ritual use, linden became a symbol of third gender to Scythians living in Russia.

=== Literary references ===
J. R. R. Tolkien composed the poem "Light as Leaf on Lindentree" which was originally published in 1925 in volume 6 of The Gryphon magazine. After many emendations it was later included in The Lord of the Rings as a song sung by Aragorn about the tale of Beren and Lúthien.

A play called The Linden Tree (1947) was written by Bradford-born English novelist, playwright and broadcaster J. B. Priestley.

Samuel Taylor Coleridge features linden trees as an important symbol in his poem "This Lime-Tree Bower My Prison" (written 1797; first published 1800).

Several of the short poems (Fraszki) of Polish poet Jan Kochanowski feature the linden. His "Na Lipę" ("To The Tilia Tree"), published in 1584, was inspired by a much-favoured tree on his country estate at Czarnolas. Kochanowski contemplated, rested and wrote in its shade, and offered refreshment to guests under its shelter, and these moments were all represented in his poetry.

A poem from Wilhelm Müller's Winterreise cycle of poems is called "Der Lindenbaum" ("The Linden Tree"). In 1827, Franz Schubert wrote the famous song cycle "Winterreise" (D 911) based on these poems. In Thomas Mann's novel The Magic Mountain, a recording of this song cycle is an important plot device and philosophical touchstone.

Hans Christian Andersen's short story "The Elf of the Rose" mentions a linden tree and its leaves frequently.

In The Grimm Brothers' fairy tale The Frog Prince, the princess drops her golden ball into the pond while sitting under a linden tree.

Goethe's The Sorrows of Young Werther features a linden tree throughout the novel, and the protagonist, Werther, is buried under the tree after his suicide.

In Swann's Way, the first book of Proust's In Search of Lost Time, the narrator dips a petite madeleine into a cup of lime-blossom tea. The aroma and taste of cake and tea triggers his first conscious involuntary memory.

"The Three Linden Trees" is a 1912 fairy tale by Hermann Hesse strongly influenced by the Greek legend of Damon and Pythias. The story, set in the medieval period, tries to explain three huge linden trees whose branches intertwine to cover the entire cemetery of the Hospital of the Holy Spirit in Berlin (see The Complete Fairy Tales of Hermann Hesse).

John Updike's novel The Centaur, like James Joyce in Ulysses, uses myth in an attempt to turn a modern and common scene into something more profound, a meditation on life and man's relationship to nature and eternity. In it Updike parallels the lives of modern characters with the Greek myth in which Chiron's mother Philyra transforms into a linden tree to escape the shame of giving birth to a seemingly mutant half-horse, half-man as a result of her being raped by Cronus.

The lime tree is referred to in the 1953 story "The Man Who Planted Trees" by Jean Giono. The unnamed narrator of the story re-visits a once abandoned and desolate village around which the man referenced by the books title (Elzéard Bouffier) has planted a forest over a period of 40 years. He returns to find by the fountain: "I saw that there was indeed a fountain, that it was abundant, and, which touched me most, that someone had planted a lime tree next to it, which might already have been four years old, already thick; an undeniable symbol of resurrection.

Eminescu's Linden Tree (Romanian: Teiul lui Eminescu) is a 500-year-old silver lime situated in Iași, Romania. Mihai Eminescu reportedly wrote some of his best works underneath this lime, rendering the tree one of Romania's most important natural monuments and an Iași landmark.

Ralph Vaughan Williams wrote the song "Linden Lea" in the 1900s.

=== In the coat of arms ===
The coat of arms of Mariehamn features lime tree leaves, referring to the local tree plant.

=== In popular culture ===
O-Zone's 2003 song "Dragostea din tei" (Love from the Linden) is titled after the tree.

Trevor Hall's 2009 song "The Lime Tree" was named for the tree and is based on Ovid's narration of Baucis and Philemon and the poem "Under der linden" by Walther von der Vogelweide.

In May 2026 a public petition, to save 18 lime trees on Victoria Road in Walton-le-Dale, Lancashire, England, from being felled, attracted more than 6,000 signatures. The trees, planted in 1912 as a tribute to commemorate the Coronation of King George V, were planned to be removed as part of the Preston & South Ribble Flood Risk Management Scheme. A public meeting, at the Yew Tree pub, to be chaired by Ribble Valley MP Maya Ellis, was planned for 8 June.

=== In surnames ===
In Sweden, where the lime tree is named "Lind", the 100 most common surnames in 2015 included at 17 Lindberg (Lime-hill), at 21 Lindström (Lime-stream), at 22 Lindqvist (Lime-twig), at 23 Lindgren (Lime-branch), and at 99 Lindholm (Lime-island).
