= The Beautiful Dream =

The Beautiful Dream may refer to:

- "The Beautiful Dream", one of The Complete Fairy Tales of Hermann Hesse written in 1912
- The Beautiful Dream, a 1978 painting and essay by Anthony Green
- "The Beautiful Dream", a 2018 song by George Ezra from the album Staying at Tamara's
