= The Trinity in art =

Christian artistic theme

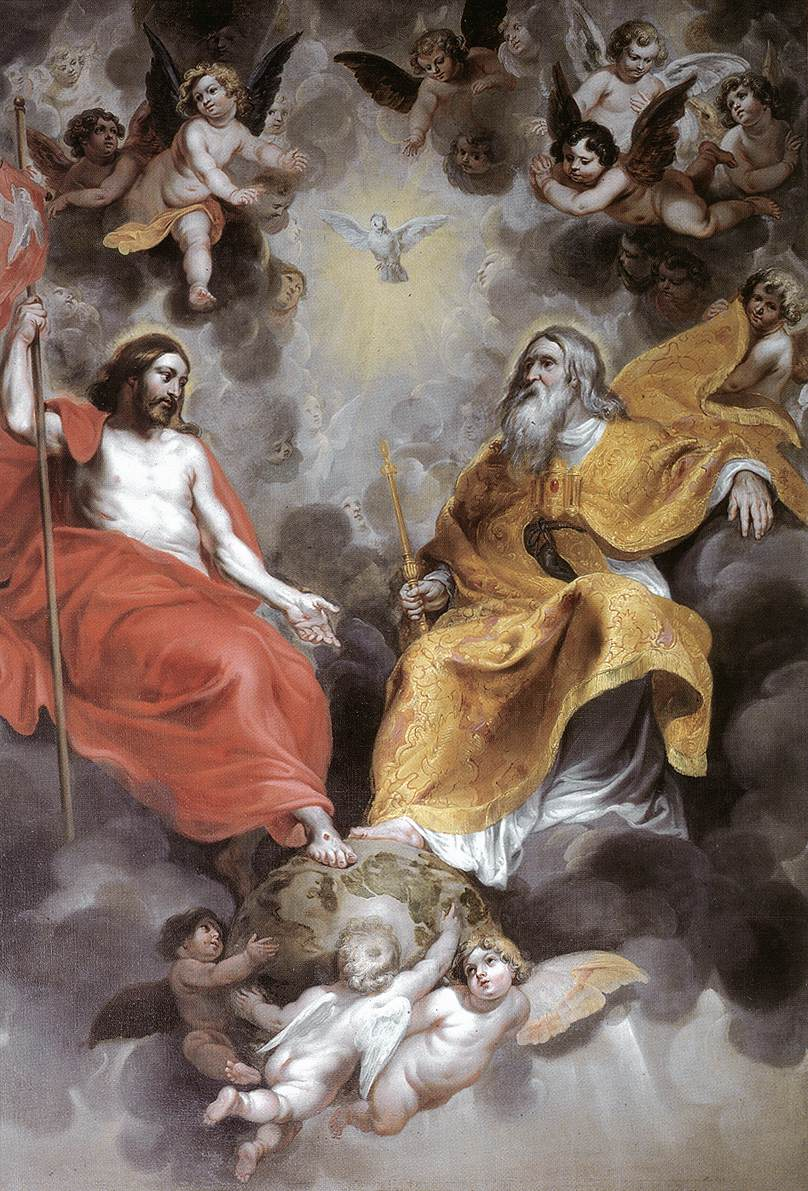
Baroque Trinity, Hendrick van Balen, 1620, (Sint-Jacobskerk, Antwerp)

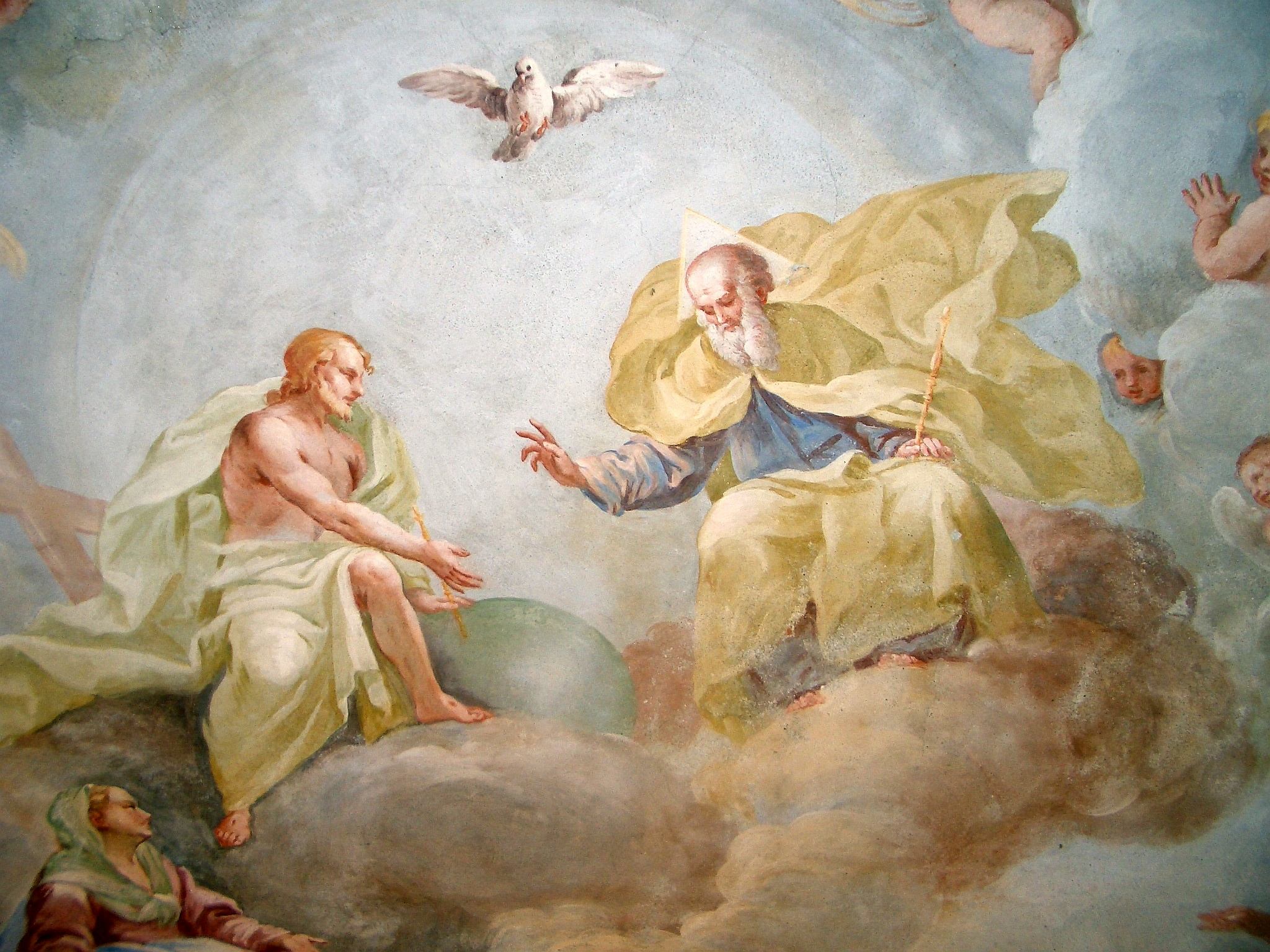
Holy Trinity, fresco by Luca Rossetti da Orta, 1738–39 (St. Gaudenzio Church at Ivrea).

The Trinity is most commonly seen in Christian art with the Holy Spirit represented by a dove, as specified in the gospel accounts of the baptism of Christ; he is nearly always shown with wings outspread. However depictions using three anthropomorphic figures appear occasionally in most periods of art.

The Father and the Son are usually differentiated by age, and later by dress, but this too is not always the case. The usual depiction of the Father as an older man with a white beard may derive from the biblical Ancient of Days, which is often cited in defense of this sometimes controversial representation. However, in Eastern Orthodoxy the Ancient of Days is usually understood to be God the Son, not God the Father—early Byzantine images show Christ as the Ancient of Days, but this iconography became rare. When the Father is depicted in art, he is sometimes shown with a halo shaped like an equilateral triangle, instead of a circle. The Son is often shown at the Father's right hand. He may be represented by a symbol—typically the Lamb or a cross—or on a crucifix, so that the Father is the only human figure shown at full size. In early medieval art, the Father may be represented by a hand appearing from a cloud in a blessing gesture, for example in scenes of the Baptism of Christ. Later, in the West, the "Throne of Mercy" (or "Throne of Grace") became a common depiction. In this style, the Father (sometimes seated on a throne) is shown supporting either a crucifix or, later, a slumped crucified Son, similar to the Pietà (this type is distinguished in German as the Not Gottes) in his outstretched arms, while the Dove hovers above or in between them. This subject continued to be popular until the 18th century at least.

By the end of the 15th century, larger representations, other than the Throne of Mercy, became effectively standardised, showing an older figure in plain robes for the Father, Christ with his torso partly bare to display the wounds of his Passion, and the dove above or around them. In earlier representations both Father, especially, and Son often wear elaborate robes and crowns. Sometimes the Father alone wears a crown, or even a papal tiara.

== Eastern Orthodox tradition ==
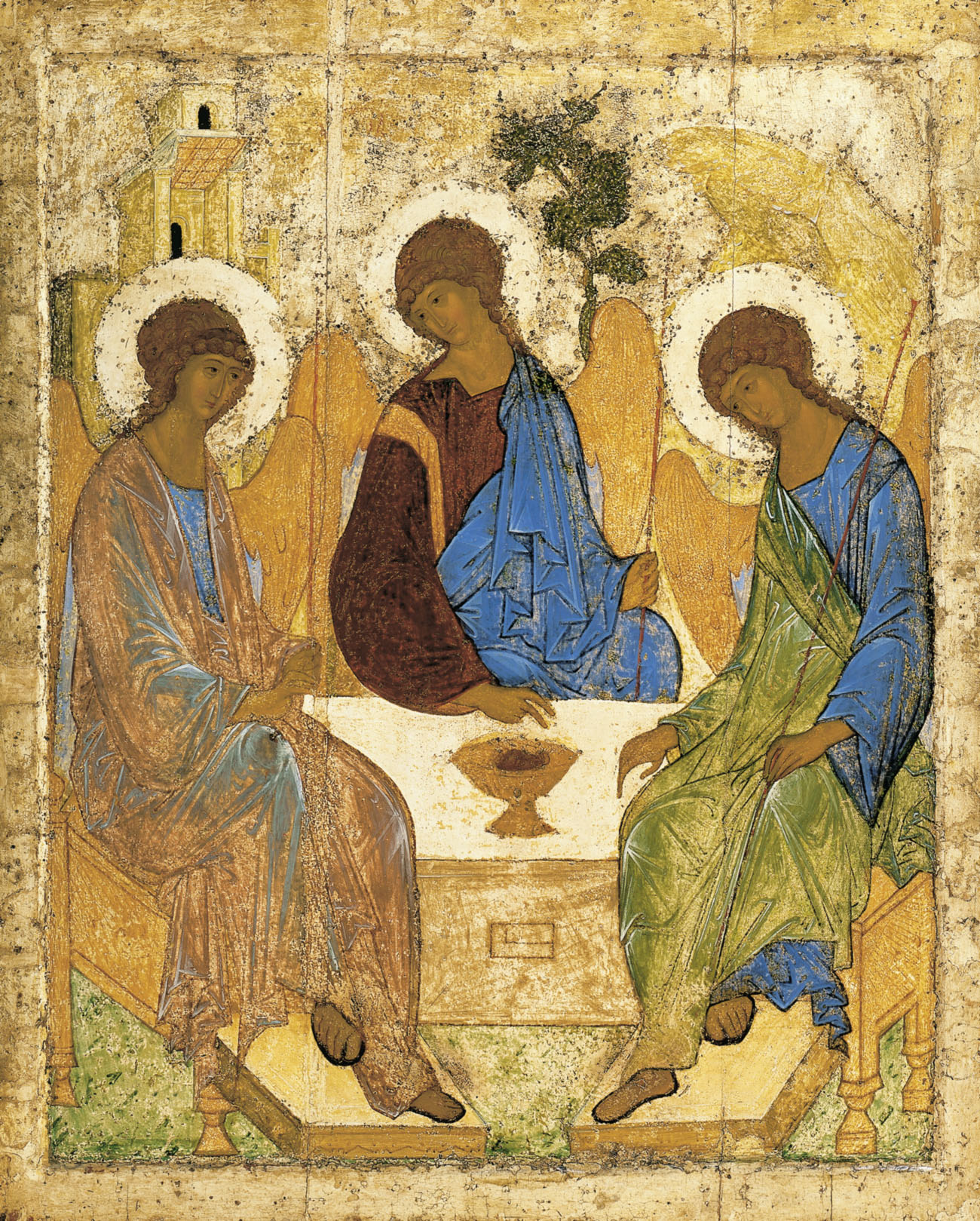
Old Testament Trinity icon by Andrei Rublev, c. 1400 (Tretyakov Gallery, Moscow)

Direct representations of the Trinity are much rarer in Eastern Orthodox art of any period—reservations about depicting the Father remain fairly strong, as they were in the West until the high Middle Ages. The Second Council of Nicea in 787 confirmed that the depiction of Christ was allowed; the situation regarding the Father was less clear. The usual Eastern Orthodox representation of the Trinity was through the "Old Testament Trinity" of the three angels visiting Abraham—said in the text to be "the Lord". However, scholars generally agree that the direct representation of the Trinity began in Greek works from the 11th century onwards, where Christ is shown as an infant sitting on the Father's lap, with the Dove of the Holy Spirit also present. Such depictions spread to the West and became the standard type there, although with an adult Christ, as described above. This type later spread back to the Eastern Orthodox world where post-Byzantine representations similar to those in the West are not uncommon outside Russia. The subject long remained sensitive, and the Russian Orthodox Church at the Great Synod of Moscow in 1667 finally forbade depictions of the Father in human form. The canon is quoted in full here because it explains the Russian Orthodox theology on the subject:

Chapter 2, §44: It is most absurd and improper to depict in icons the Lord Sabaoth (that is to say, God the Father) with a grey beard and the Only-Begotten Son in His bosom with a dove between them, because no-one has seen the Father according to His Divinity, and the Father has no flesh, nor was the Son born in the flesh from the Father before the ages. And though David the prophet says, "From the womb before the morning star have I begotten Thee", that birth was not fleshly, but unspeakable and incomprehensible. For Christ Himself says in the holy Gospel, "No man hath seen the Father, save the Son".^{cf.} And Isaiah the prophet says in his fortieth chapter: "To whom have ye likened the Lord? and with what likeness have ye made a similitude of Him? Has not the artificier of wood made an image, or the goldsmiths, having melted gold, gilt it over, and made it a similitude?" In like manner the Apostle Paul says in Acts "Forasmuch then as we are the offspring of God, we ought not to think that the Godhead is like unto gold or silver or stone, graven by art of man's imagination." And John Damascene says: "But furthermore, who can make a similitude of the invisible, incorporeal, uncircumscribed and undepictable God? It is, then, uttermost insanity and impiety to give a form to the Godhead" (Orthodox Faith, 4:16). In like manner St. Gregory the Dialogist prohibits this. For this reason we should only form an understanding in the mind of Sabaoth, which is the Godhead, and of that birth before the ages of the Only-Begotten-Son from the Father, but we should never, in any wise depict these in icons, for this, indeed, is impossible. And the Holy Spirit is not in essence a dove, but in essence he is God, and "No man hath seen God", as John the Theologian and Evangelist bears witness and this is so even though, at the Jordan at Christ's holy Baptism the Holy Spirit appeared in the likeness of a dove. For this reason, it is fitting on this occasion only to depict the Holy Spirit in the likeness of a dove. But in any other place those who have intelligence will not depict the Holy Spirit in the likeness of a dove. For on Mount Tabor, He appeared as a cloud and, at another time, in other ways. Furthermore, Sabaoth is the name not only of the Father, but of the Holy Trinity. According to Dionysios the Areopagite, Lord Sabaoth, translated from the Jewish tongue, means "Lord of Hosts". This Lord of Hosts is the Holy Trinity, Father, Son and Holy Spirit. And although Daniel the prophet says that he beheld the Ancient of Days sitting on a throne, this should not be understood to refer to the Father, but to the Son, Who at His second coming will judge every nation at the dreadful Judgment.

== Oriental Orthodox traditions ==
Trefoil and triangle interlaced.

The Coptic Orthodox Church never depicts God the Father in art although he may be identified by an area of brightness within art such as the heavenly glow at the top of some icons of the baptism of the Lord Jesus Christ. In contrast, the Ethiopian Orthodox Tewahedo Church has many ancient icons depicting the Holy Trinity as three distinct persons. These icons often depict all three persons sitting upon a single throne to signify unity. The Eritrean Orthodox Tewahedo Church follows the same practice.

== Scenes ==
Only a few of the standard scenes in Christian art normally included a representation of the Trinity. The accounts in the Gospels of the Baptism of Christ were considered to show all three persons as present with a separate role. Sometimes the other two persons are shown at the top of a crucifixion. The Coronation of the Virgin, a popular subject in the West, often included the whole Trinity. But many subjects, such as Christ in Majesty or the Last Judgement, which might be thought to require depiction of the deity in the most amplified form, only show Christ. There is a rare subject where the persons of the Trinity make the decision to incarnate Christ, or God sending out the Son. Even more rarely, the Angel of the Annunciation is shown being given the mission.

== Less common types of depiction ==
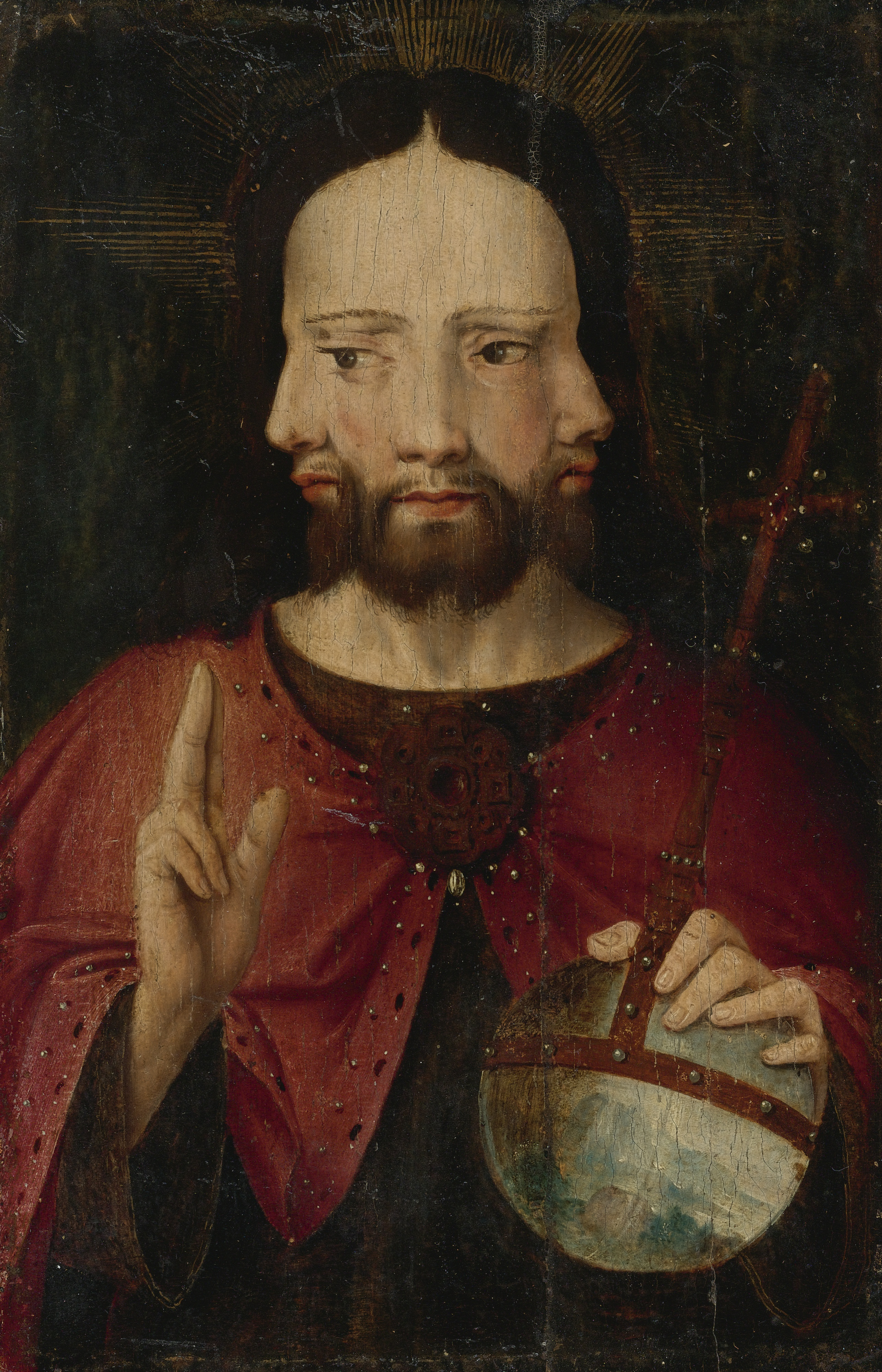
Vultus trifrons, Netherlandish School, c. 1500

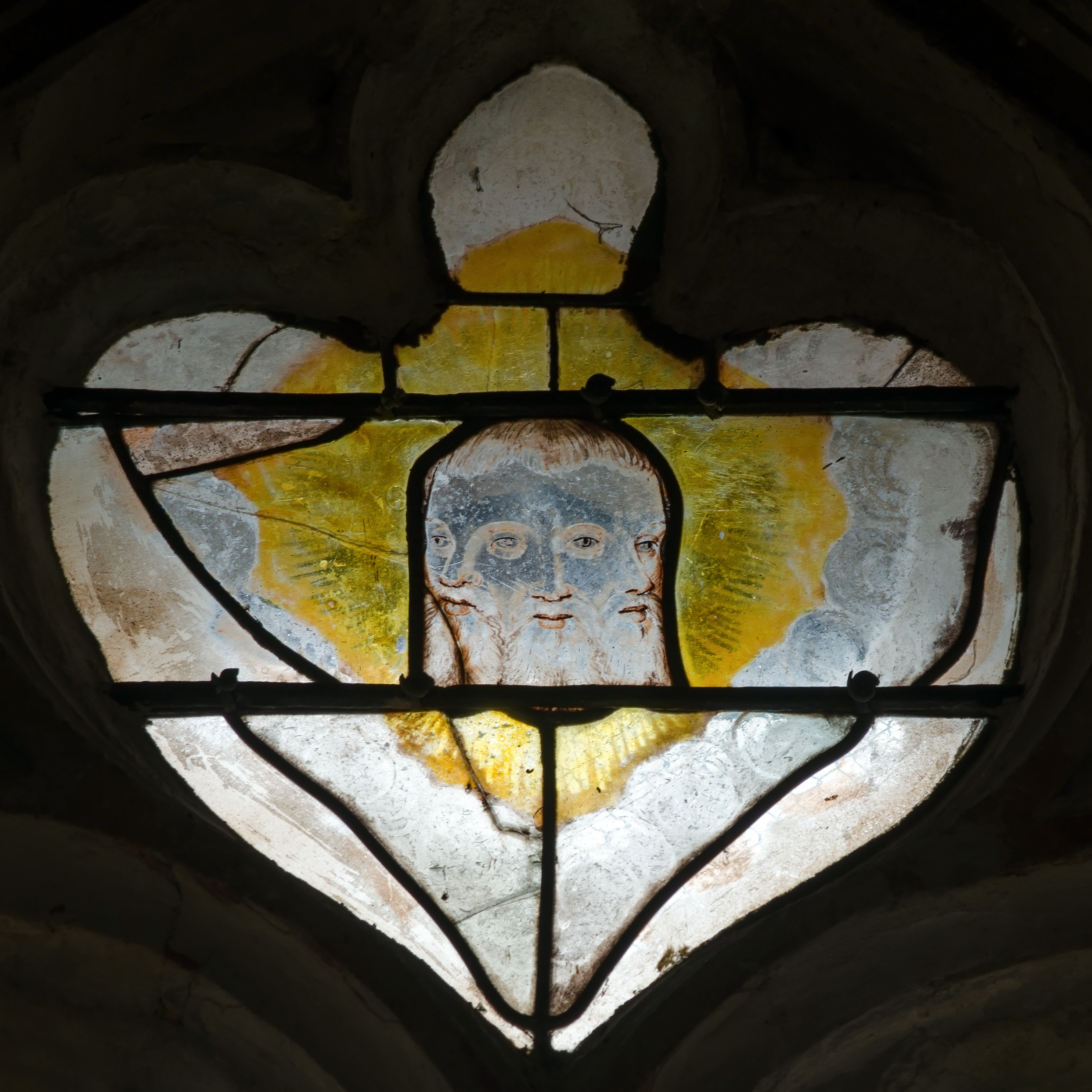
Stained glass window depicting the Trinity in three persons. Saint Martin church, Courgenard, France.

Especially in the 15th century, and in the less public form of illuminated manuscripts, there was experimentation with many solutions to the issues of depicting the three persons of the Trinity. The depiction of the Trinity as three identical persons ("triandric") is rare, because each person of the Trinity is considered to have distinct attributes. Nonetheless, the earliest known depiction of God the Father as a human figure, on the 4th century Dogmatic Sarcophagus, shows the Trinity as three similar bearded men creating Eve from Adam, probably with the intention of affirming the consubstantiality recently made dogma in the Nicene Creed. There are many similar sarcophagi, and occasional images at intervals until a revival of the iconography in the 15th century. The depiction was seen as controversial and was stated formally to be not approved nor prohibited, but merely tolerated by Pope Benedict XIV in the 18th century. Even rarer is the depiction of the Trinity as a single anthropoid figure with three faces (Latin: Vultus Trifrons), because the Trinity is defined as three persons in one Godhead, not one person with three attributes (this would imply Modalism, which is defined as heresy in traditional Orthodox Christianity). Such "Cerberus" depictions of the Trinity as three faces on one head were mainly made among Catholics during the 15th to 17th centuries, but were condemned after the Catholic Council of Trent, and again by Pope Urban VIII in 1628, and many existing images were destroyed.

The Trinity may also be represented abstractly by symbols, such as the triangle (or three triangles joined together), trefoil or the triquetra—or a combination of these. Sometimes a halo is incorporated into these symbols. The use of such symbols are often found not only in painting but also in needlework on tapestries, vestments and antependia, in metalwork and in architectural details.

== Gallery ==
=== Throne of Mercy ===
A representation of the Holy Trinity in which God the Father is holding the crucified Christ and the Holy Ghost is represented as a dove.

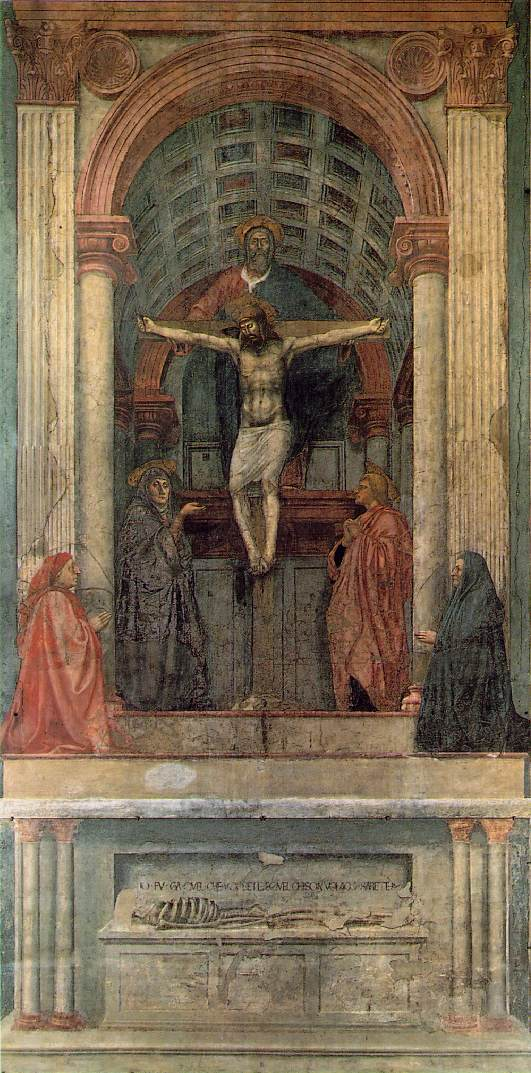
Florence

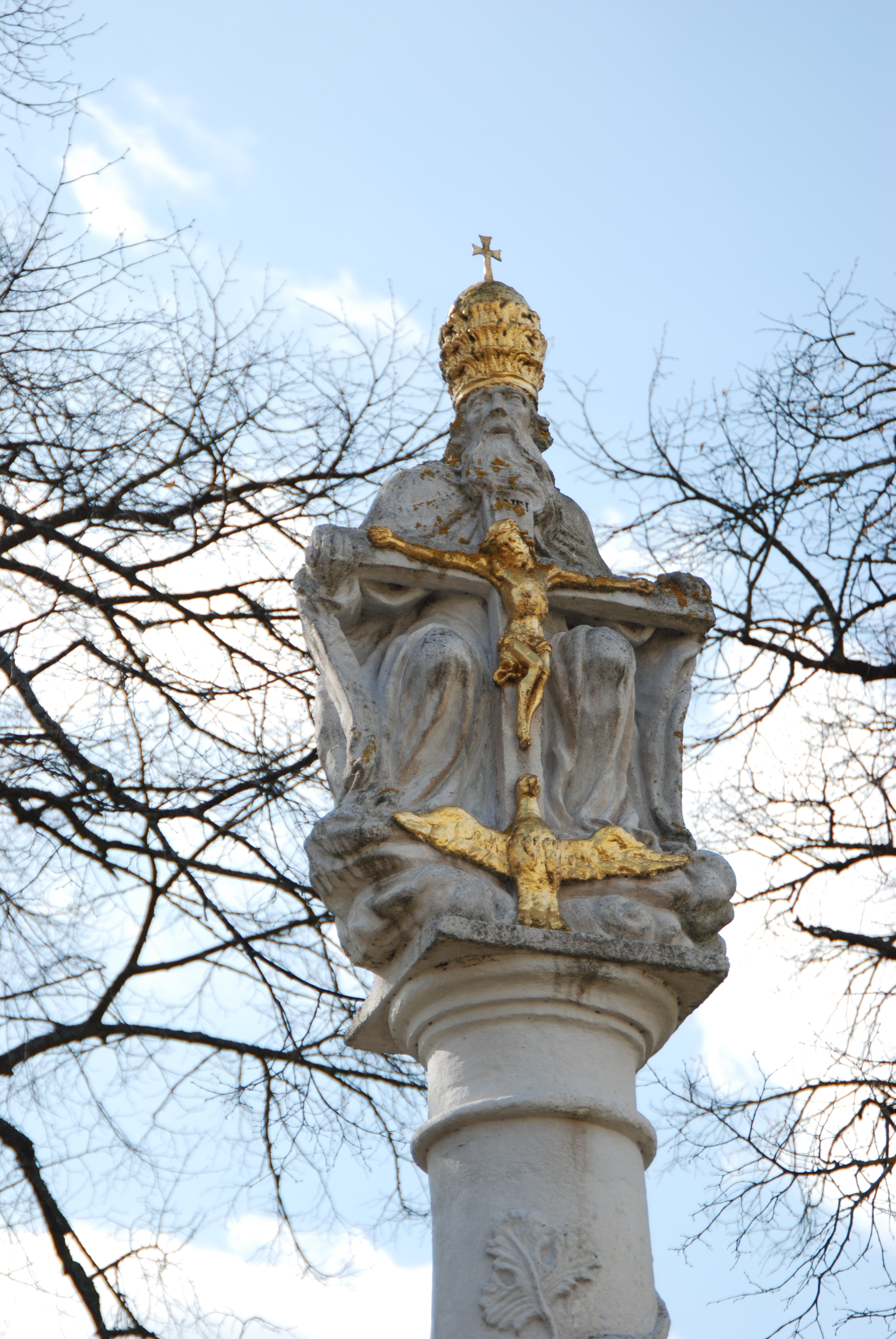
Trinity column, Eberau

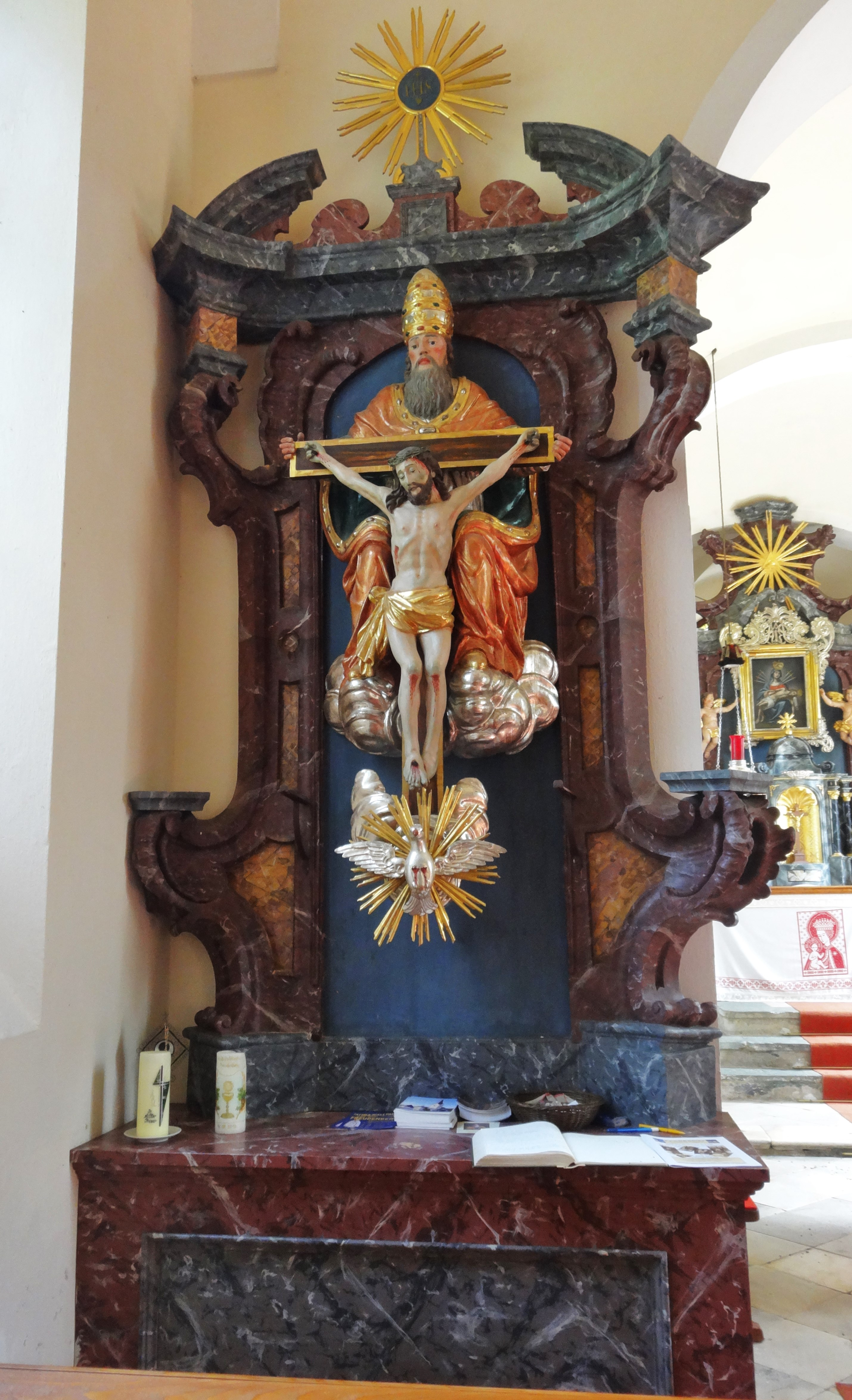
Side altar, Freudenberg

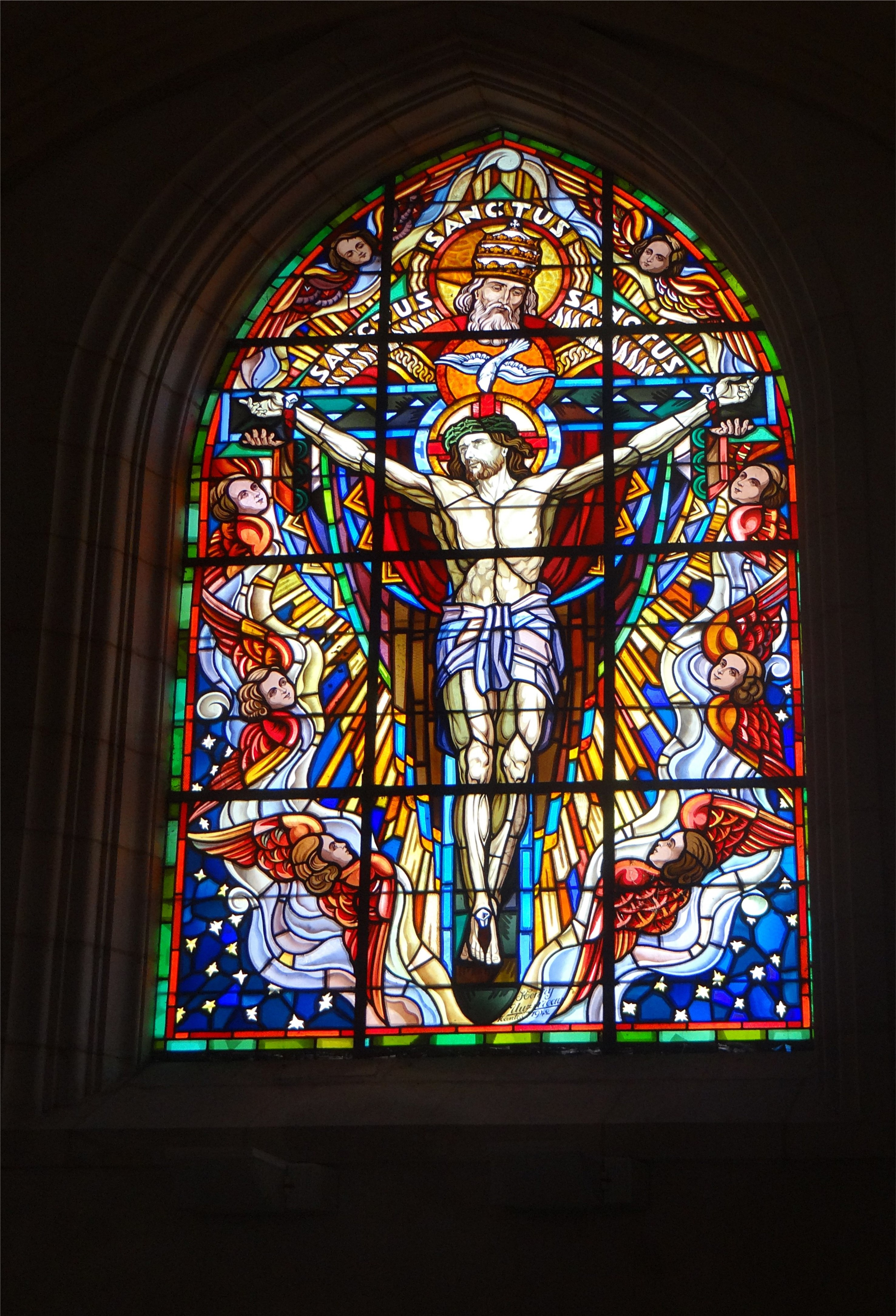
Stained glass "Throne of Mercy", Champagné les Marais

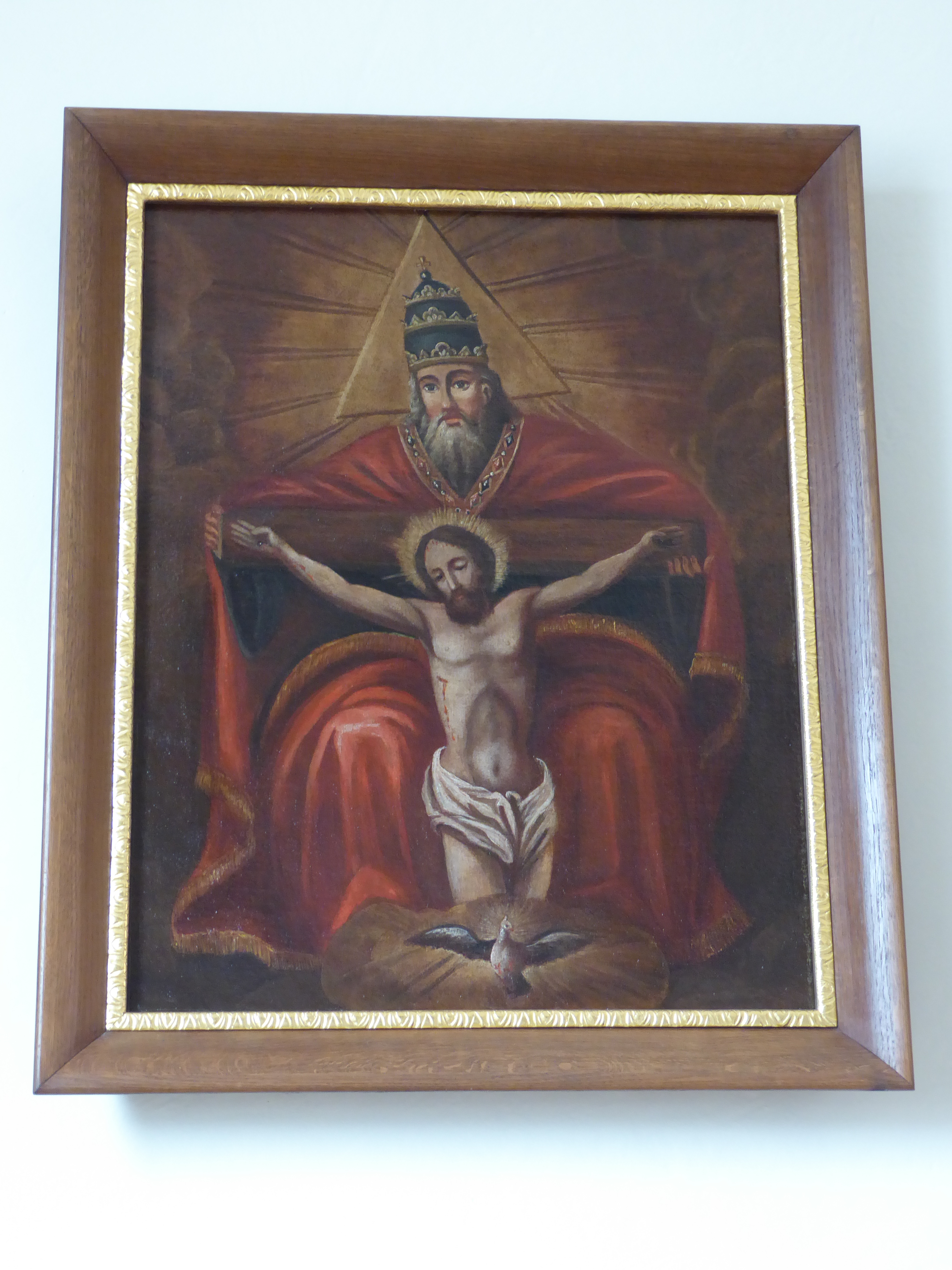
Painting, "Mercy seat", Aggsbach Markt

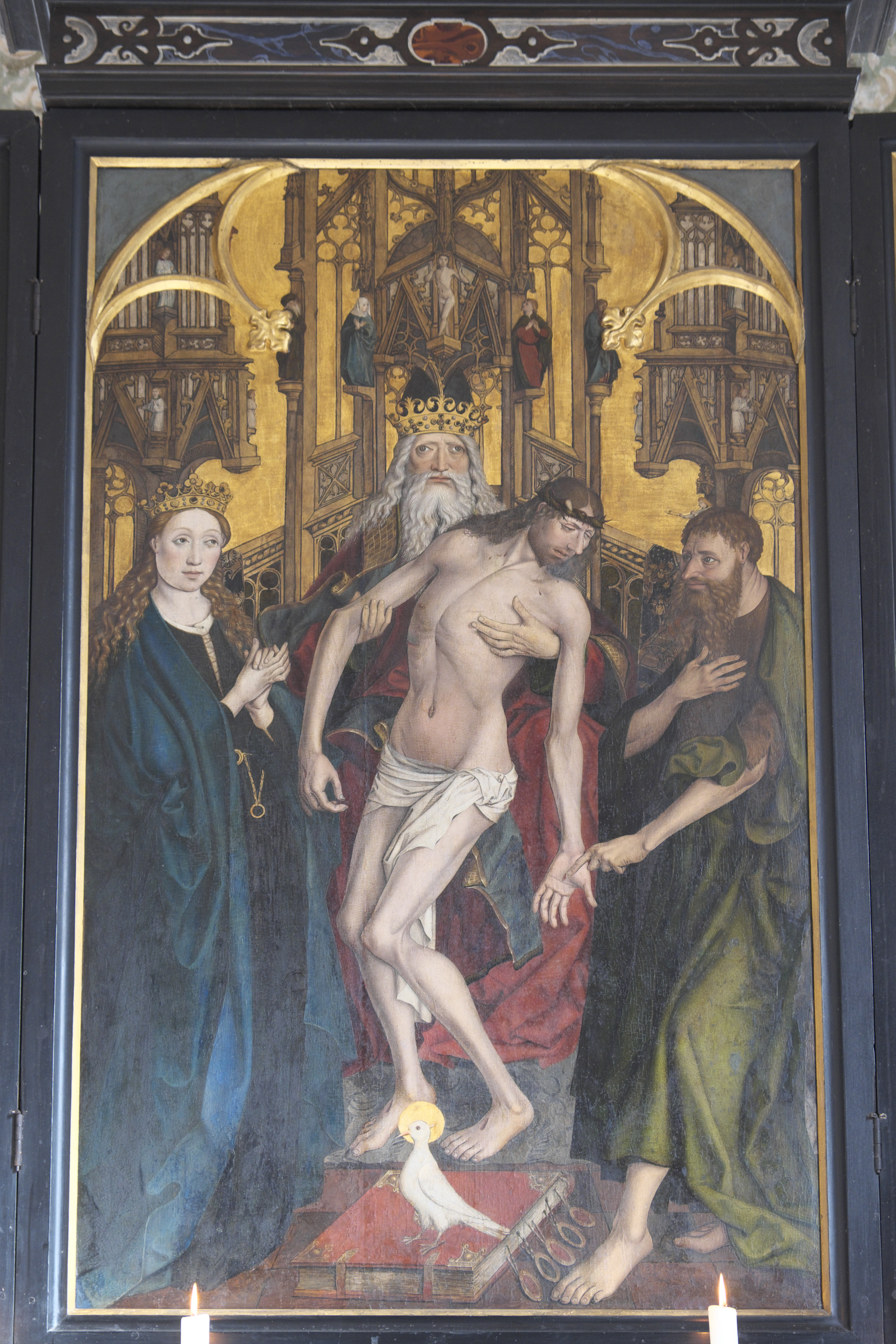
Weilheim, Mercy Seat with Mary and John the Baptist

=== Different depictions ===
Four 15th-century depictions of the Coronation of the Virgin show the main ways of depicting the persons of the Trinity.

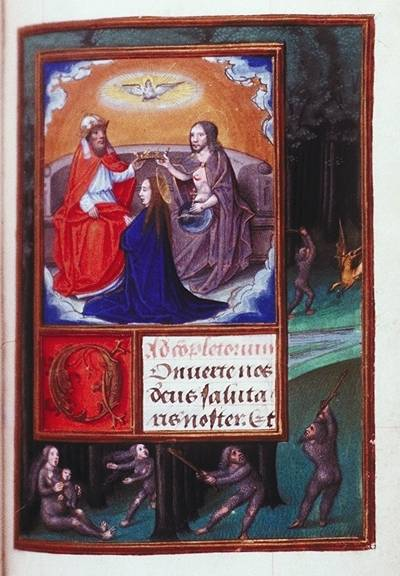
The conventional depiction, with older Father, dove, and Christ showing the wounds of his Passion

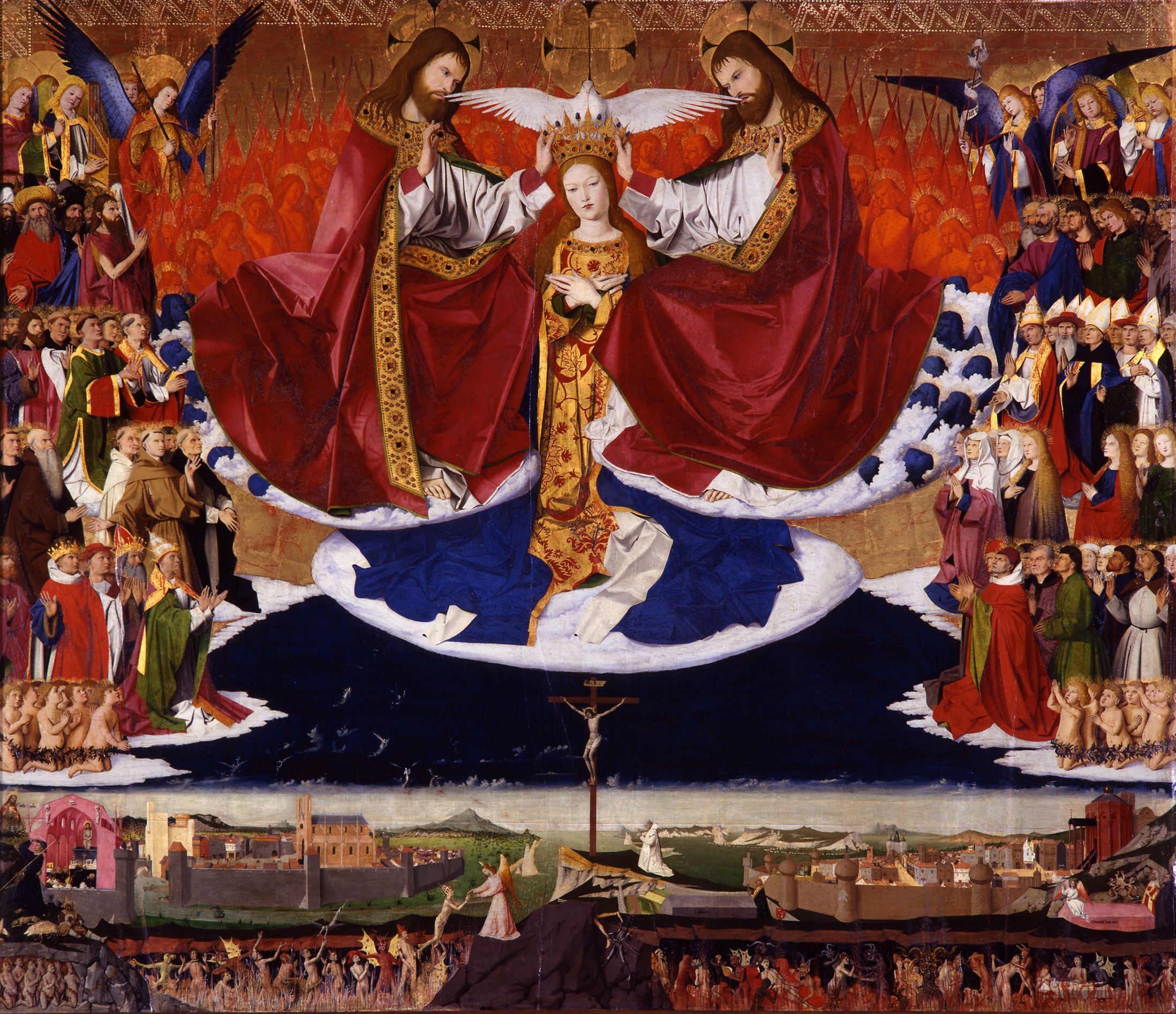
Enguerrand Quarton with Christ and God the Father as identical figures, and a dove, as specified by the cleric who commissioned the work

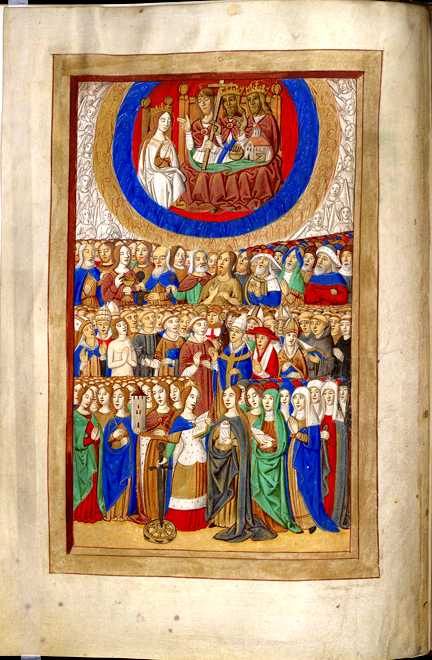
Page from an English Book of Hours (c. 1500), with three differentiated human figures for the Trinity

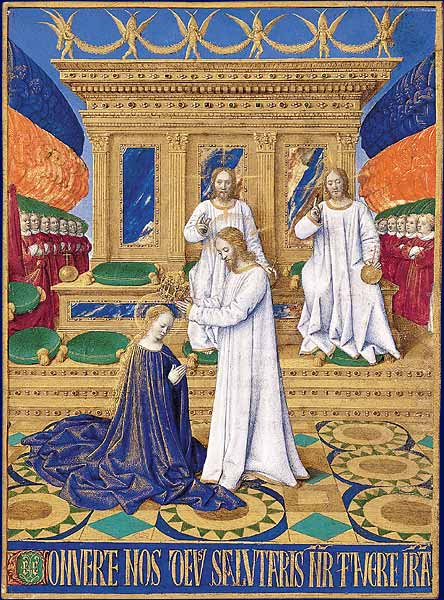
Jean Fouquet, also with three human figures, but identical.

=== Depictions using two different human figures and a dove ===
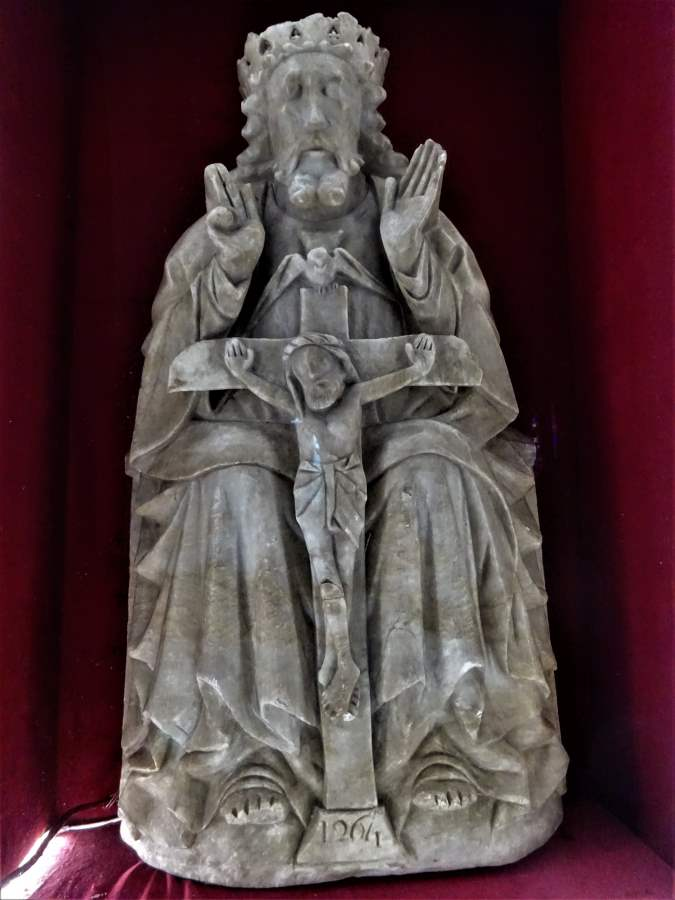
Statuette in the Black Abbey, Kilkenny, Ireland; inscribed "1264" but thought to actually date to the 14th century

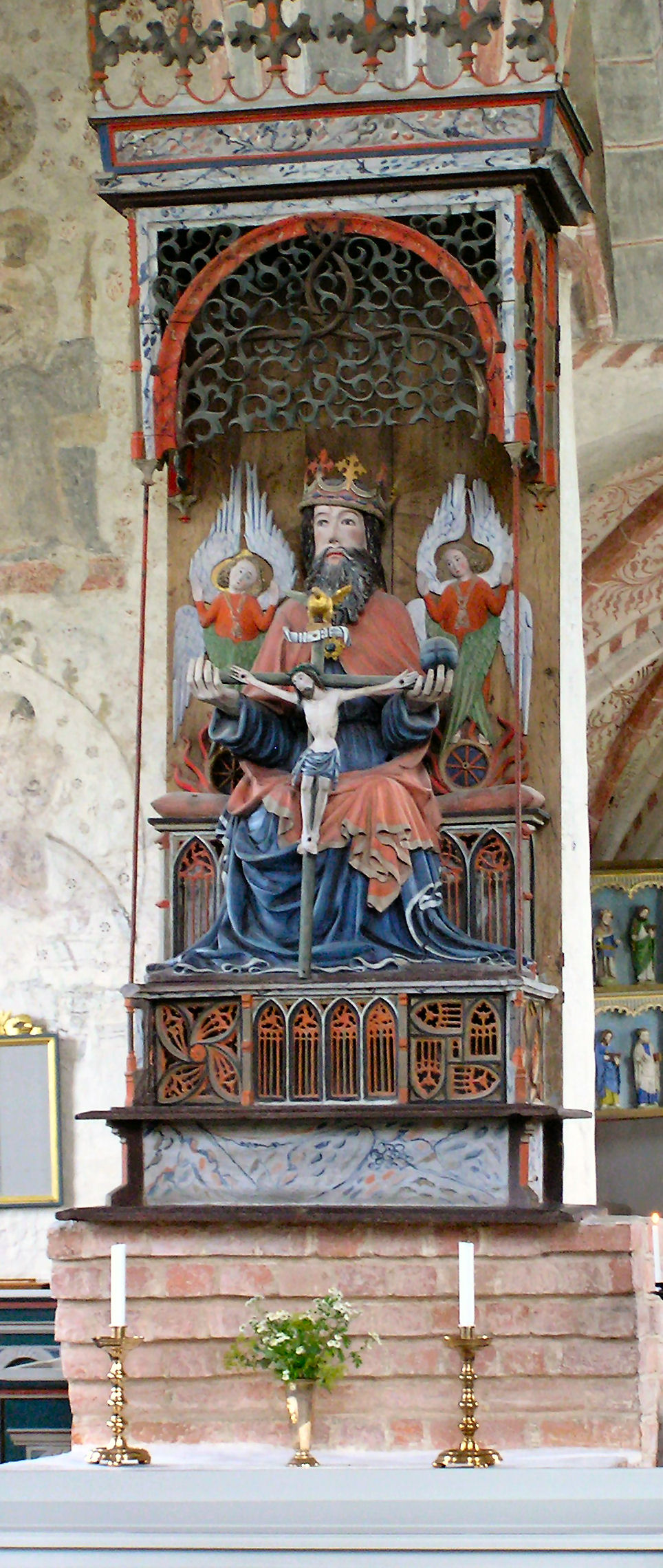
"Throne of Mercy", Gothic, Sweden

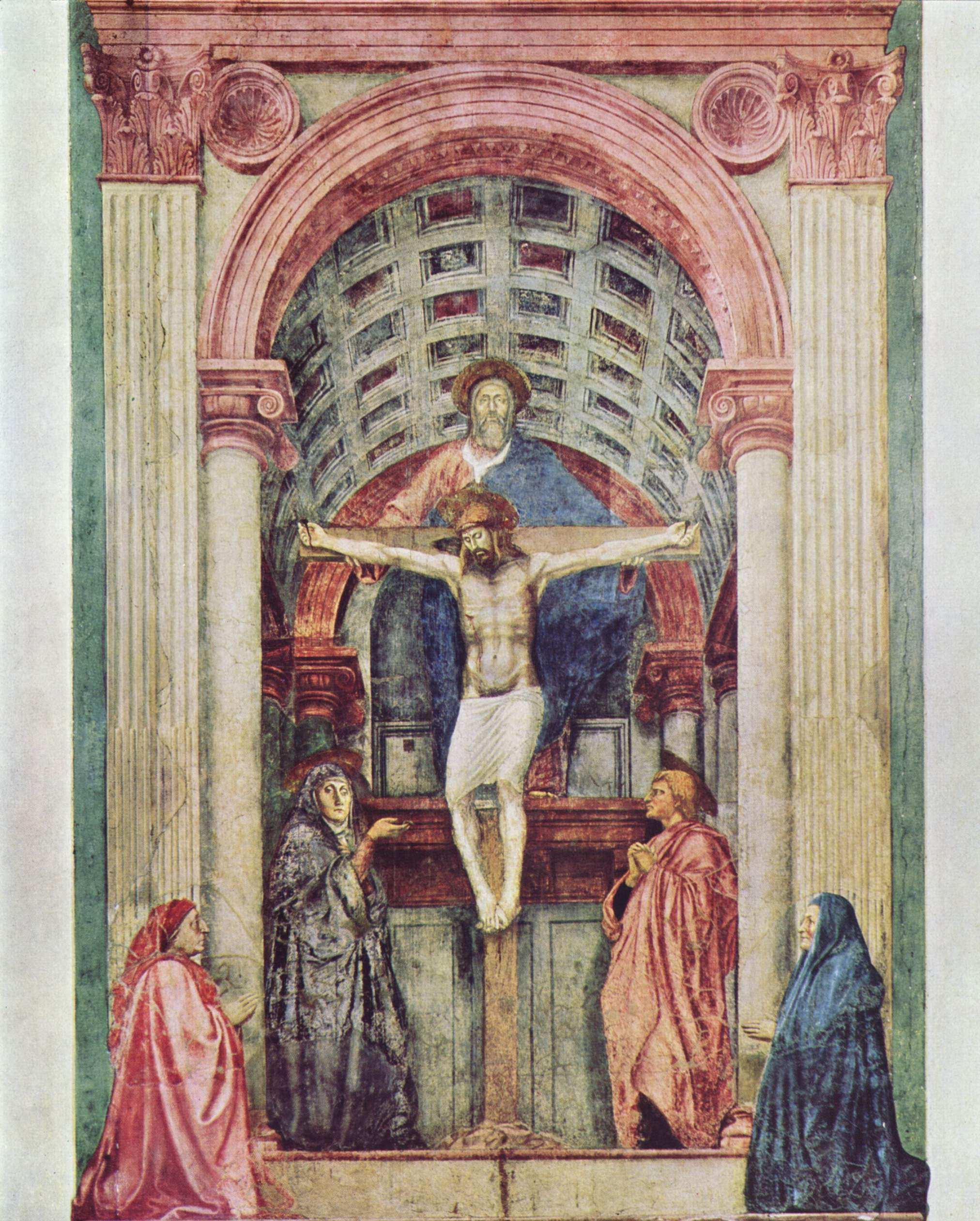
Holy Trinity, Masaccio, church of Santa Maria Novella in Florence, 1425−1427

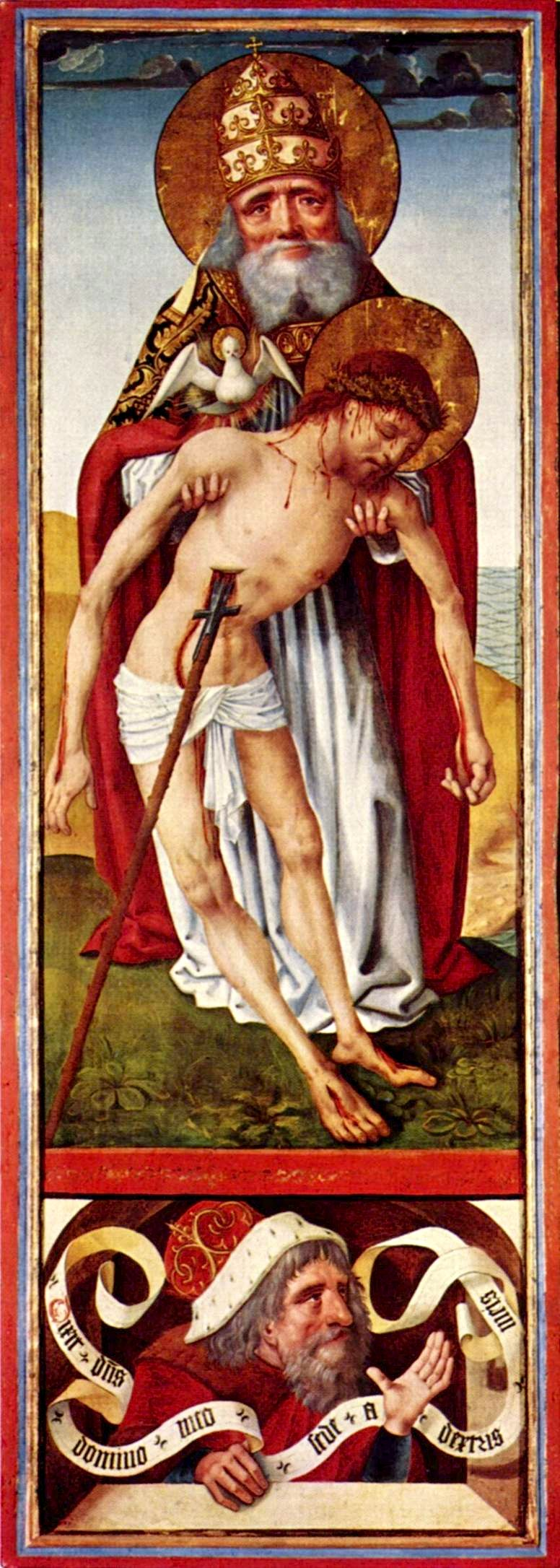
Not Gottes, Bernt Notke c. 1483 (St.-Annen-Kloster, Lübeck)

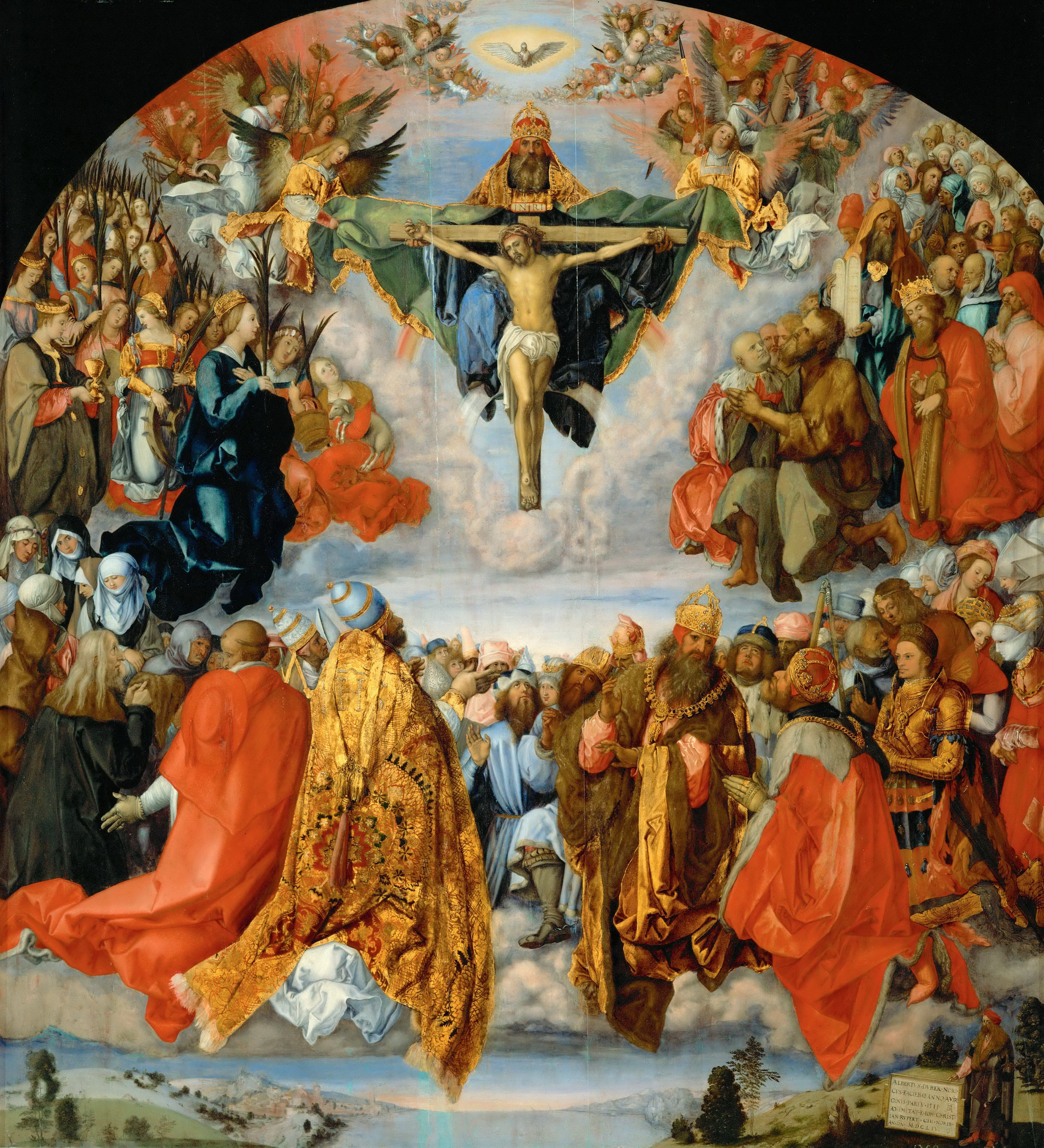
"Throne of Mercy", Albrecht Dürer, 1511

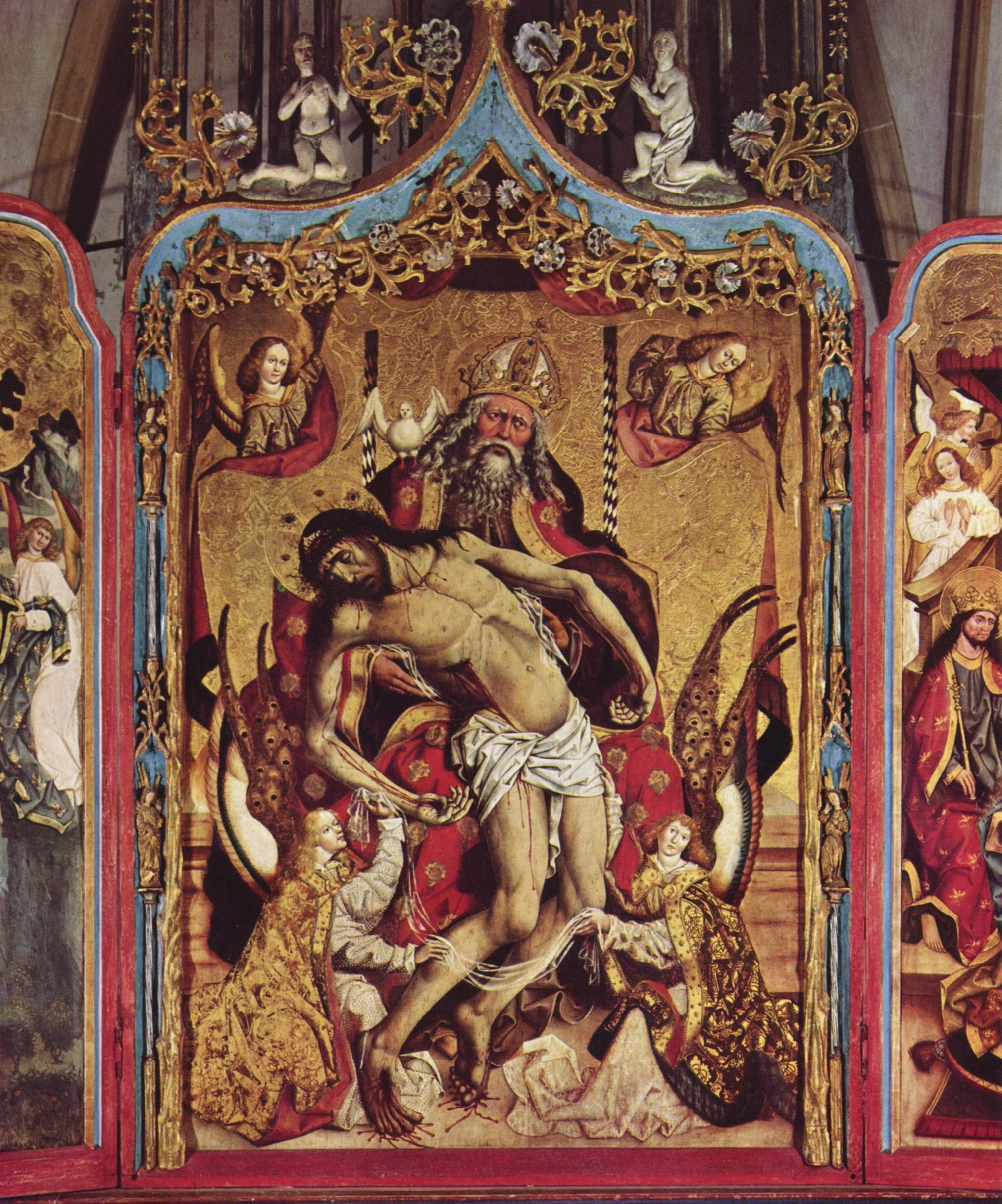
"Gottes Not", Jan Polack (Polish artist working in Germany), 1491

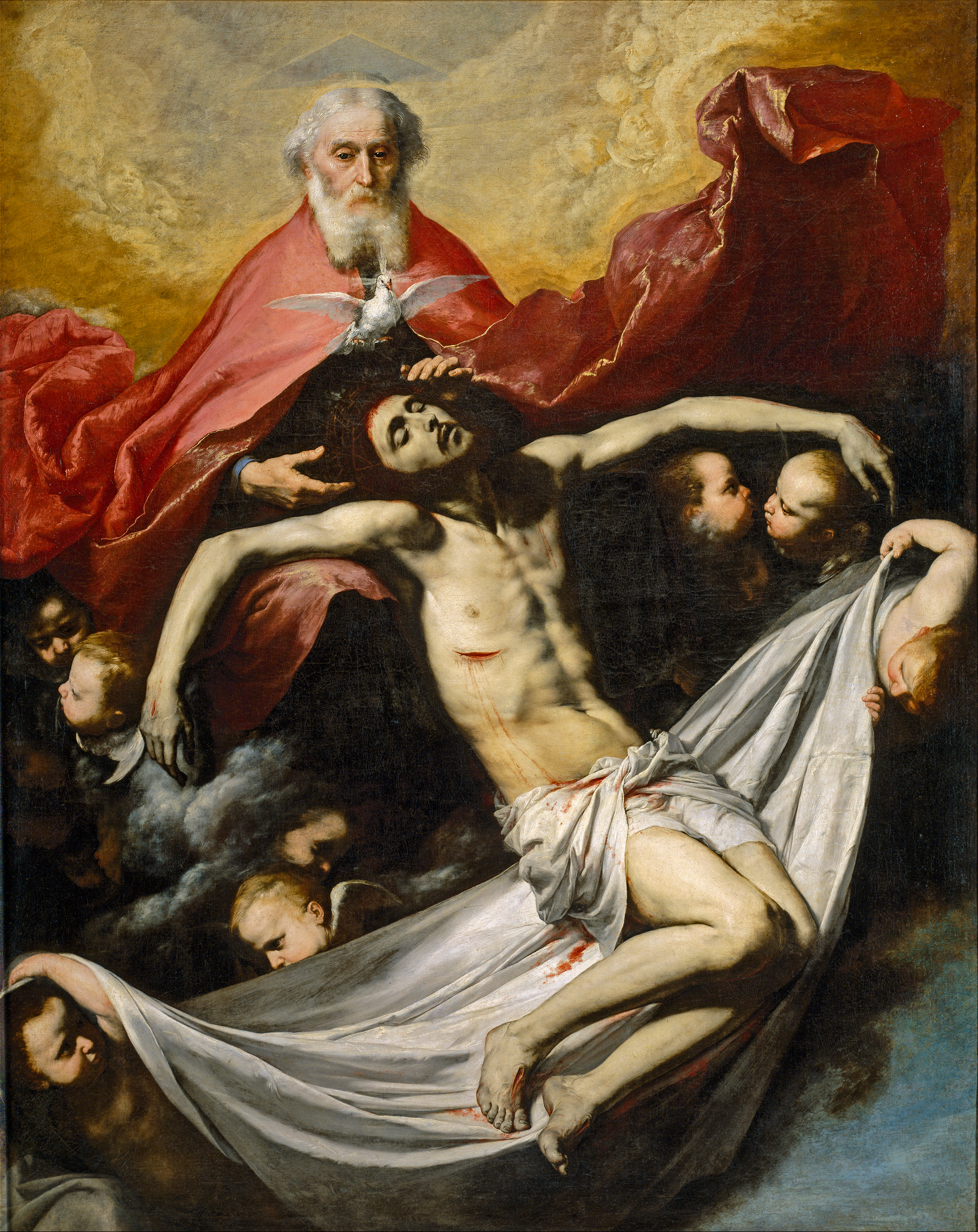
"Gottes Not", Jusepe de Ribera, ca. 1635

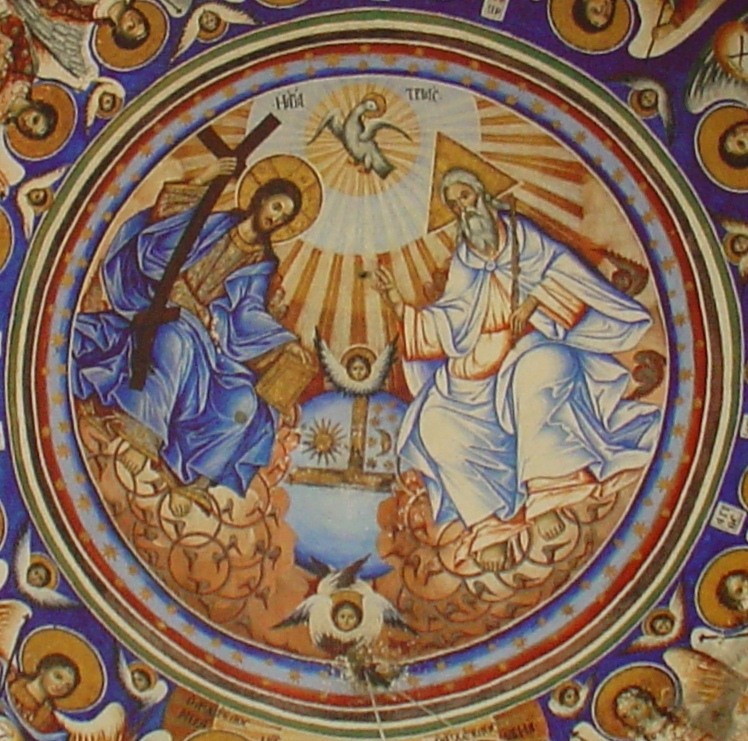
Icon of the Holy Trinity at Vatopedi Monastery, Mount Athos

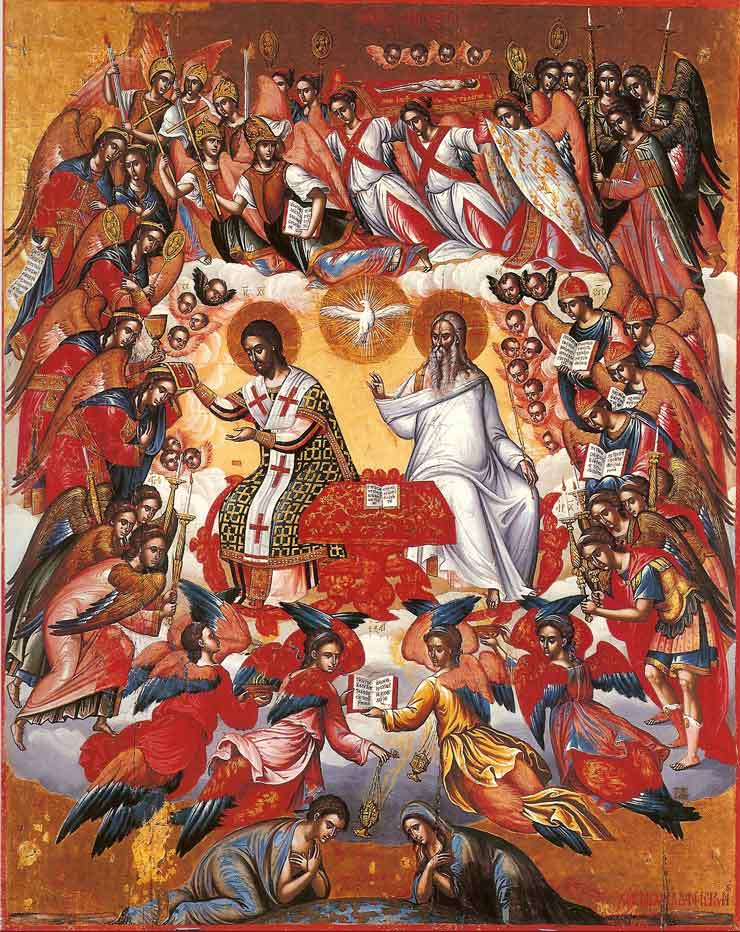
Michael Damaskenos Icon of the Holy Liturgy, from the 16th century Cretan school, showing Western stylistic influence.

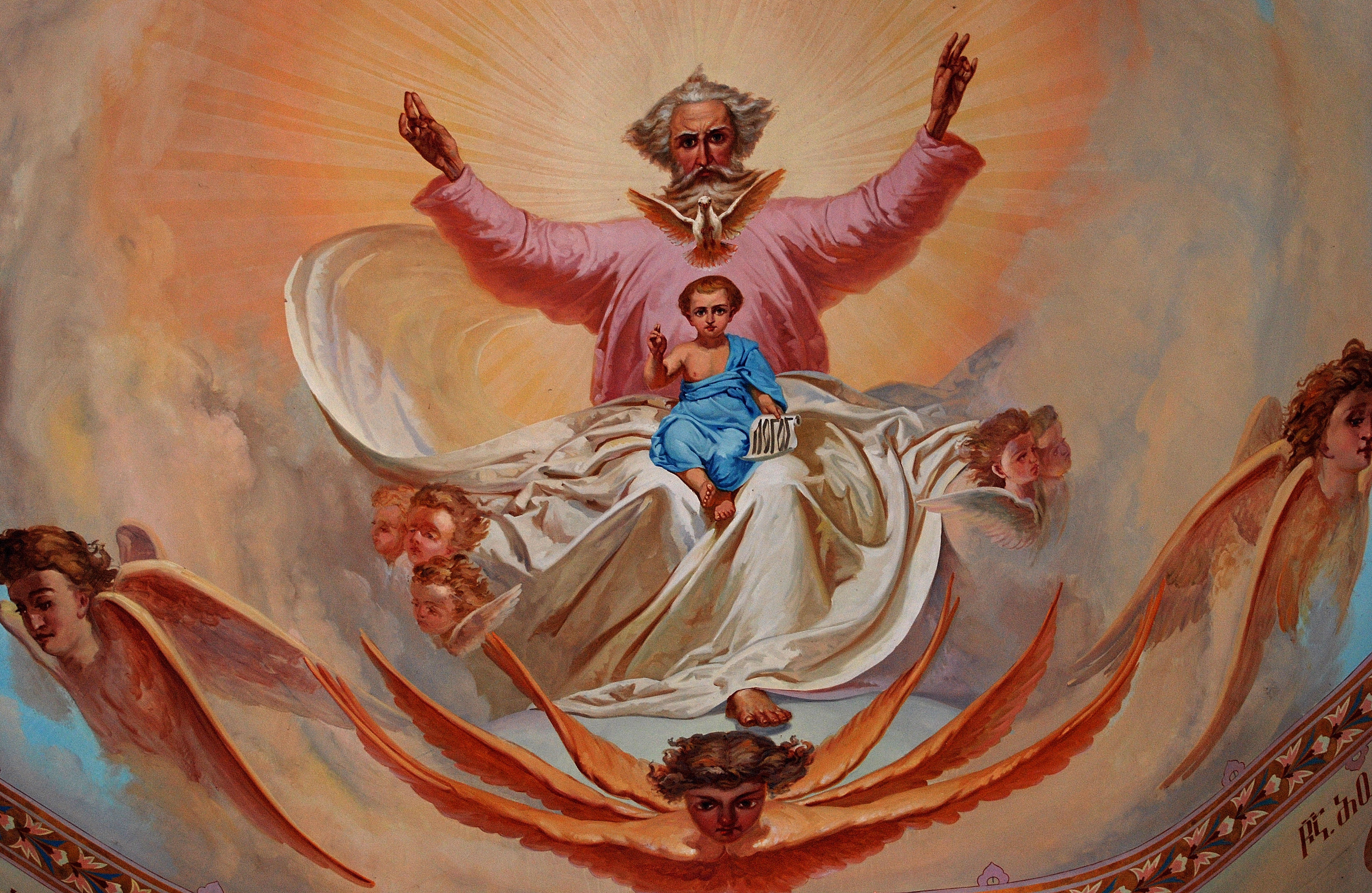
Wall Painting in Georgia's ancient Monastery, Shio-Mghvime

=== Other depictions ===
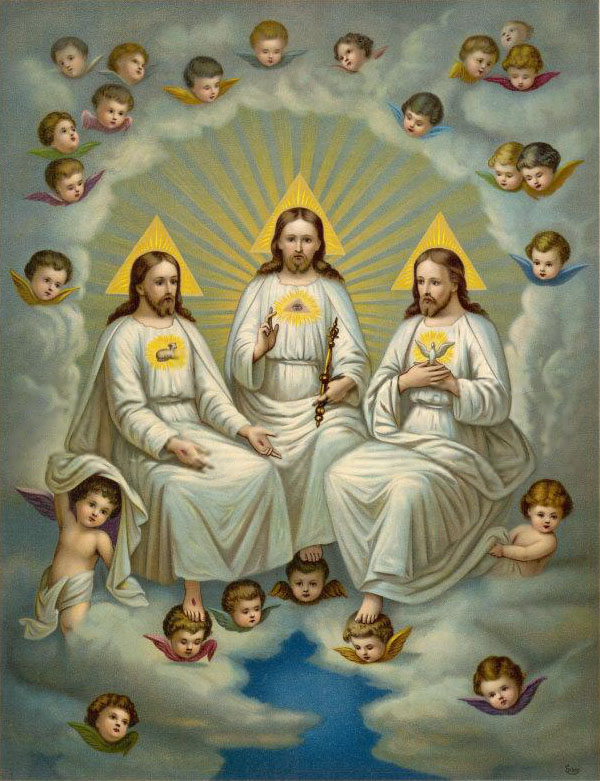
Holy Trinity by Fridolin Leiber (1853–1912)

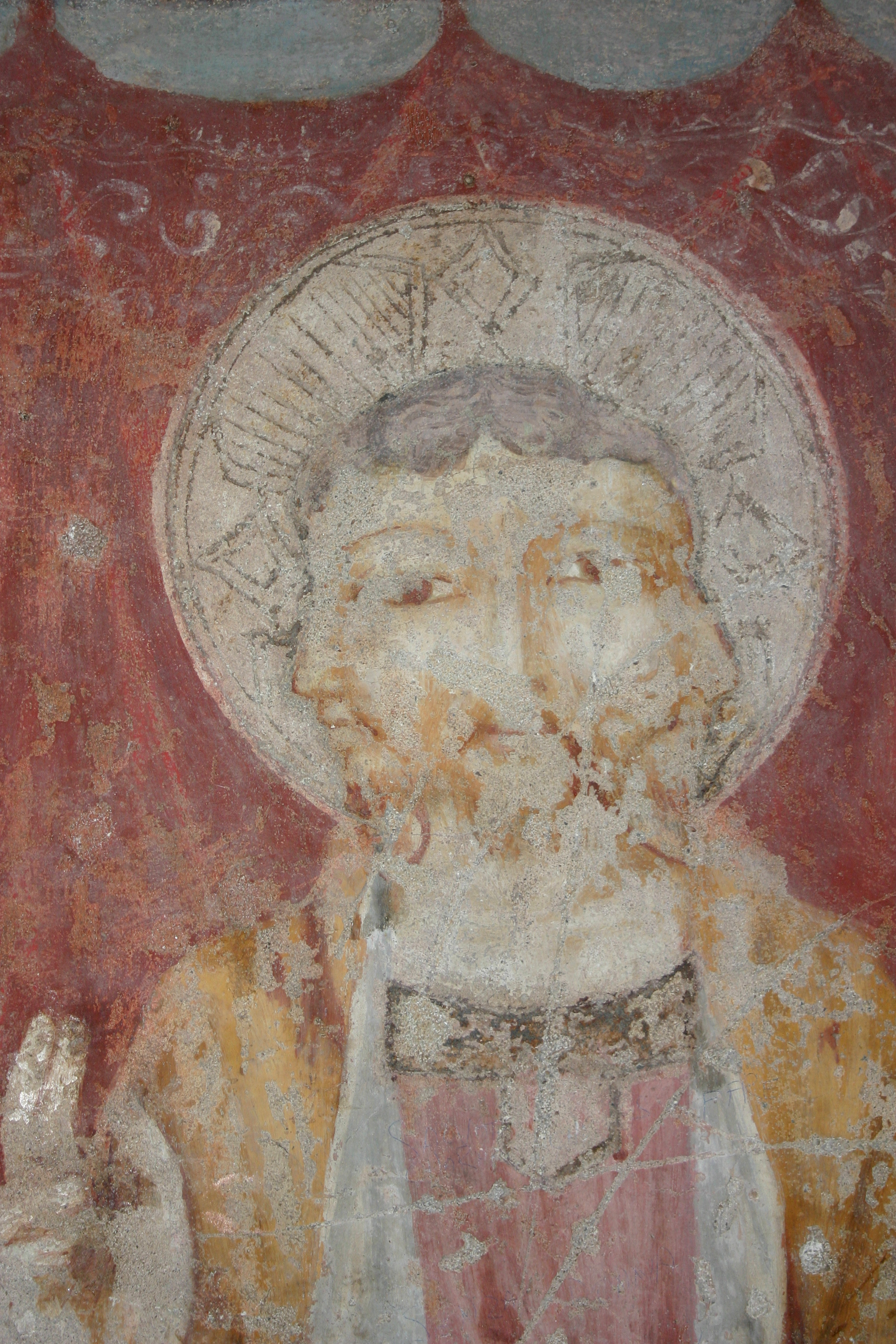
Allegory of the Holy Trinity, painted as three faces fused in one, medieval fresco in Perugia

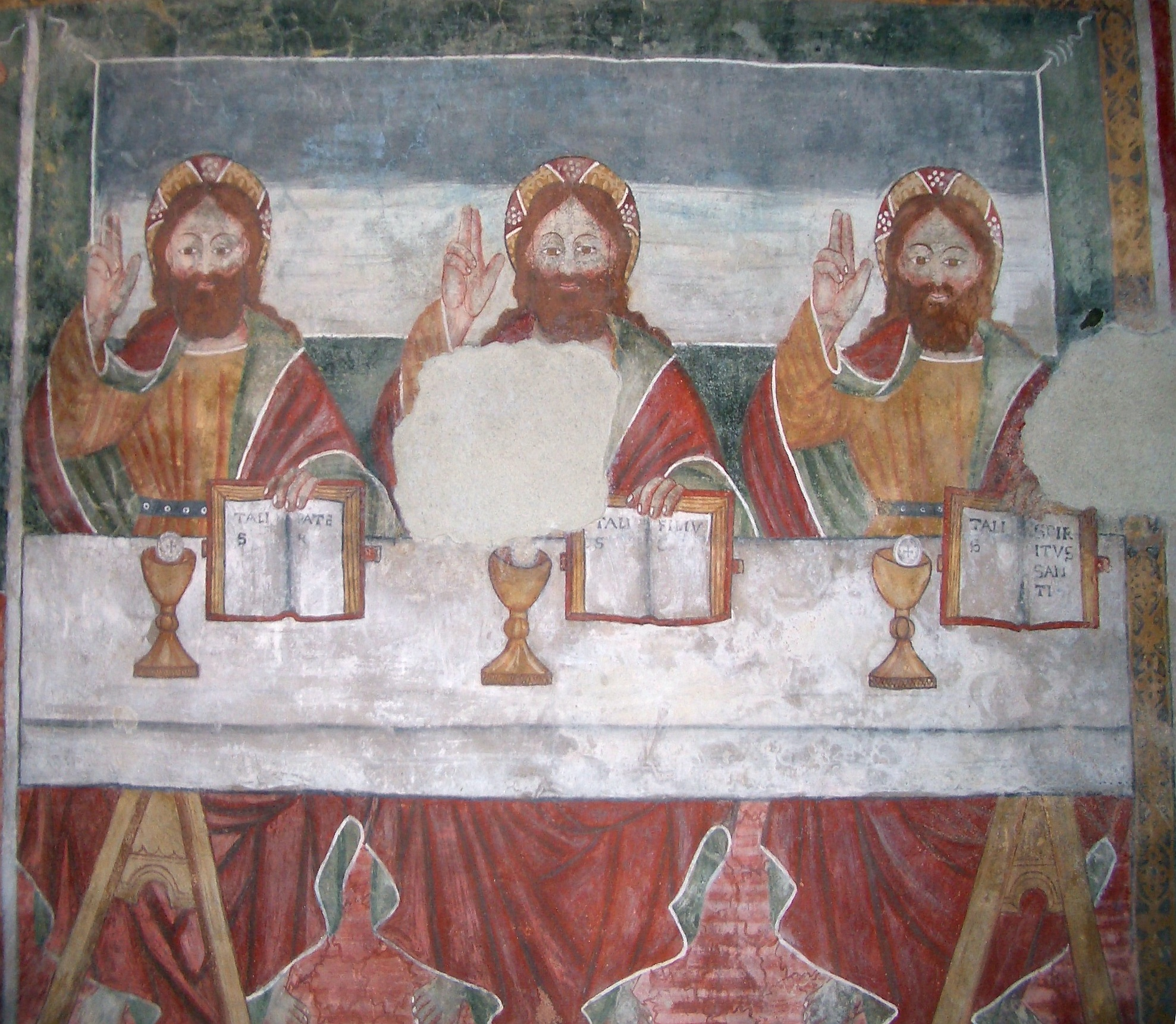
Trinity, 15th-century fresco, Castelletto Cervo (Vercelli, Italy), St Peter and St. Paul Church

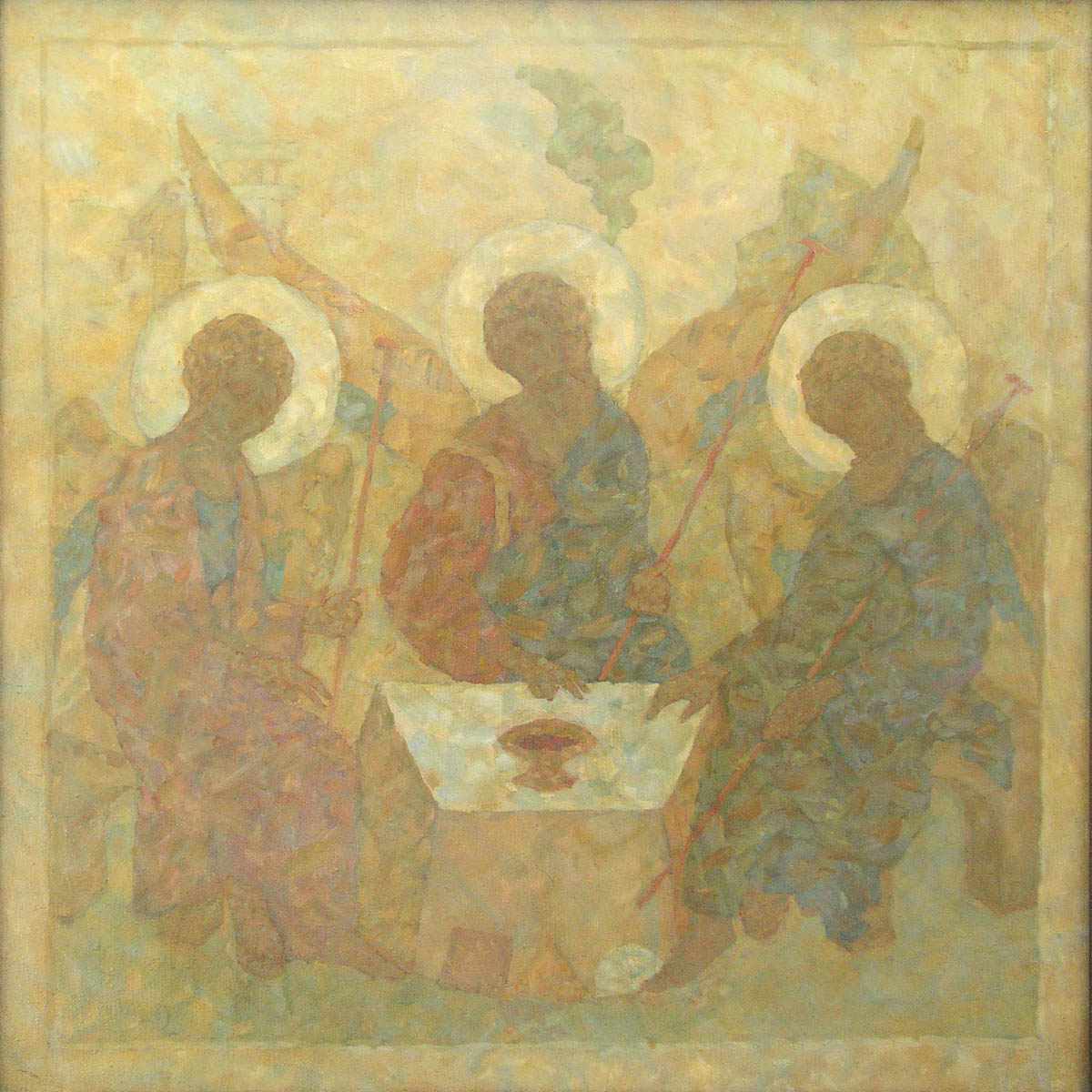
Holy Trinity by M. Presnyakov (inspired by Andrei Rublev's famous icon)

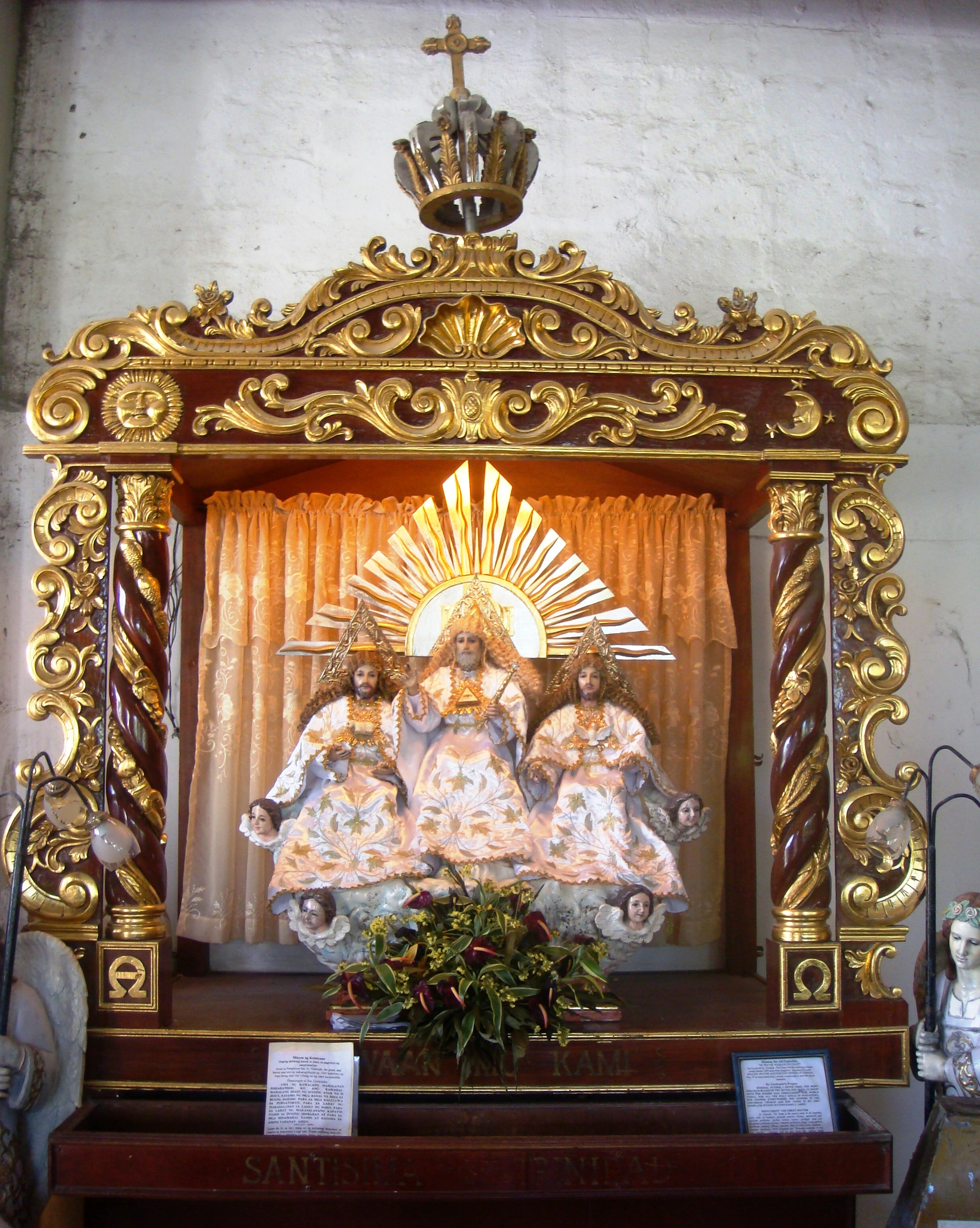
Holy Trinity statue in the style of Fridolin Leiber's painting, Santísima Trinidad Quasi-Parish, Malolos City, Philippines.

== See also ==
- Christian art
- God the Father in Western art
- Holy Spirit in Christian art
- Holy Trinity Icon
- Marian and Holy Trinity columns
- Media related to Holy Trinity at Wikimedia Commons
- Media related to Trinity symbols at Wikimedia Commons
- Media related to Holy Trinity columns at Wikimedia Commons
- Media related to Marian and Holy Trinity columns at Wikimedia Commons
