= Strange News from Another Star =

1919 collection of short stories by Hermann Hesse

- English first edition cover (1972)
- Author: Hermann Hesse
- Original title: Märchen
- Translator: Denver Lindley
- Cover artist: David Pocknell
- Language: German
- Genre: Short story
- Publisher: S. Fischer Verlag
- Publication date: 1919
- Publication place: Germany
- English publication date: 1972
- Media type: Print

Strange News from Another Star is a collection of eight short stories written by the German author Hermann Hesse between 1913 and 1918. It was first published as Märchen in German in 1919 and was translated to English by Denver Lindley in 1972. The first English publication was in 1972.

== Stories ==
The stories, with the year in which they were written, are:

- "Augustus" (1913)
- "The Poet" (1913)
- "Flute Dream" (1914)
- "Strange News from Another Star" (1915)
- "The Hard Passage" (1917)
- "A Dream Sequence" (1916)
- "Faldum" (1916)
- "Iris" (1918)

Märchen (which means Fairy Tales) comprised seven of these stories. "Flute Dream" was added for the English publication in 1972 as per an arrangement Hesse had made for the final collected edition of his works.

These stories were also published in The Complete Fairy Tales of Hermann Hesse in 1995 with a new English translation by Jack Zipes. Two of the stories' English titles changed with this new translation:

- "Strange News from Another Star" became "Strange News from Another Planet"
- "The Hard Passage" became "The Difficult Path"

== Background ==
These stories were written before and during the First World War and brought Hesse into conflict with supporters of the war, his country and its government. Unlike his earlier works, these stories do not lend themselves to rational interpretation. They are essentially fairy tales dealing with dream worlds, the subconscious and magic. In these stories, Hesse challenged conventional intellectual life and the orthodoxy of the world.

== In popular culture ==
- Blur's 1997 self-titled fifth album contains a song of the same name.
