= Liebesprobe =

German folksong

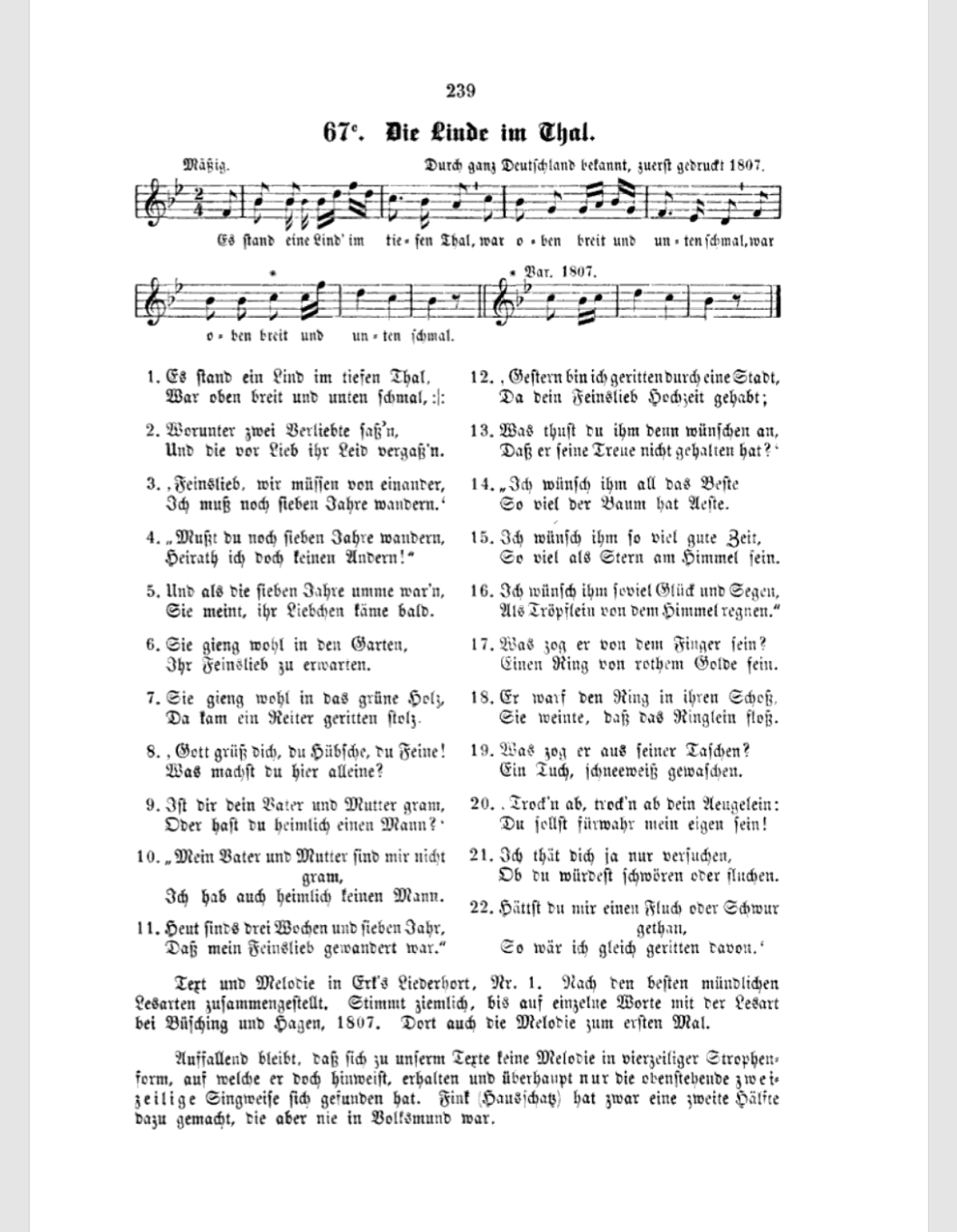
- Text and melody (1893)

Song
- Language: German
- English title: Proof of Love
- Published: before the 17th century
- Genre: Folk
- Songwriter: Traditional

"Liebesprobe" (Proof of Love) is an old German folk song. Already before the 17th century the song appeared in some records in the form of a distich. A number of its versions are found in many later folklore collections, such as Des Knaben Wunderhorn (1806), Deutscher Liederhort (1893).

Commentary in 1868 described the song as one "of the most beautiful and widespread" in German folklore: The significance of the poem's initial setting under a linden tree is emphasised: "The linden tree plays a key role in these songs; at eventide, the lovers caress in its shade, it is their tree of choice, and perhaps for the reason that the linden leaf has the shape of a human heart." (Note: See also: Lime tree in culture)

German versions of the song have been known at least from the 15th century. Similar motifs could be discovered in the folklores of its neighbours — in some Dutch, West Slavic, and Danish sources.

== Words ==
Liebesprobe (Note: Liederhort: "Die Linde im Thal")
Es sah eine Linde ins tiefe Tal, (Note: Liederhort: not "sah" but "stand"; "oben breit und unten schmal")
War unten breit und oben schmal,
Worunter zwei Verliebte saßen,
Vor Lieb' ihr Leid vergaßen. (Note: Liederhort: "Und die vor ...")

"Feins Liebchen, wir müssen von einander,
Ich muß noch sieben Jahre wandern."
"Mußt du noch sieben Jahr wandern,
So heurath ich mir keinen andern." (Note: Liederhort: "Heirat ich doch ...")

Und als nun die sieben Jahr um waren, (Note: Liederhort: "umme", not "feines Liebchen" but "Feinslieb)
Sie meinte ihr Liebchen käme bald,
Sie ging wohl in den Garten,
Ihr feines Liebchen zu erwarten.

Sie ging wohl in das grüne Holz,
Da kam ein Reiter geritten stolz.
"Gott grüße dich, Mägdlein feine, (Note: Liederhort: "Gott grüß dich, du Hübsche, du feine")
Was machst du hier alleine?

Ist dir dein Vater oder Mutter gram, (Note: Liederhort: not "oder" but "und")
Oder hast du heimlich einen Mann?"
"Mein Vater und Mutter sind mir nicht gram,
Ich hab auch heimlich keinen Mann.

Gestern wars drei Wochen über sieben Jahr, (Note: Liederhort: not "Gestern wars" but "Heut sinds" ... "und sieben")
Da mein feines Liebchen ausgewandert war." (Note: Liederhort: not Da" but "Daß")
"Gestern bin ich geritten durch eine Stadt,
Da dein feins Liebchen Hochzeit gehabt. (Note: Liederhort: not "feins Liebchen" but "Feinslieb")

Was thust du ihm denn wünschen, (Note: Liederhort: add "... an,")
Daß er nicht gehalten seine Treu?" (Note: Liederhort: "Daß er seine Treue nicht gehalten hat?")
"Ich wünsch ihm so viel gute Zeit, (Note: Liederhort: these wishes are in a different order.)
So viel wie Sand am Meere breit,

Ich wünsch ihm so viel Glücke fein,
So viel wie Stern am Himmel sein.
Ich wünsch ihm soviel Glück und Segen (Note: This stanza is only in Liederhort.)
Als Tröpflein von dem Himmel regnen.

Ich wünsch ihm all das Beste,
So viel der Baum hat Äste,
Ich wünsch ihm auch eine gute Nacht, (Note: This stanza is only in Des Knaben Wunderhorn)
Weil er mein nimmer hat gedacht."

Was zog er von seinem Finger? (Note: Liederhort: "... von dem Finger sein?")
Ein'n Ring von reinem Gold gar fein. (Note: Liederhort: Einen Ring von rotem Golde fein.")
Er warf den Ring in ihren Schooß,
Sie weinte, daß der Ring gar floß. (Note: Liederhort: "... daß das Ringlein ...")

Was zog er aus seiner Taschen?
Ein Tuch sehr weiß gewaschen. (Note: Liederhort: "... schneeweiß ...")
"Trockn ab, trockn ab dein Äugelein,
Du sollst hinfort mein eigen sein. (Note: Liederhort: not "hinfort" but "fürwahr")

Ich tu dich nur versuchen, (Note: Liederhort: not "tu dich nur" but "tät dich ja nur")
Ob du würd'st schwören oder fluchen;
Hättst du einen Fluch oder Schwur gethan, (Note: Liederhort: "Hättst du mir ...")
So wär ich gleich geritten davon."

A linden looked into a deep valley,
was broad at the bottom and narrow on top,
under it two lovers sat,
who through their love forgot their pain.

"My love, we have to part,
I must travel for seven years."
"If you must travel for seven years,
I shall marry no other."

When those seven year were over,
she thought her lover would come soon;
she went into the garden
to await her lover.

She went into the green woods,
there was a knight proudly riding:
"God's greetings, fine maiden,
what are you doing here alone?

Are your father and mother cross with you,
or do you have secretly a man?"
"My father and mother are not cross with me,
and I don't have secretly a man."

Yesterday it was three weeks more than seven years
that my lover went away travelling."
"When I was riding through the town yesterday
you lover had a wedding.

What do you wish for him,
as he not held his promise?"
"I wish him so much good time
as there are grains at the wide sea.

I wish him so much good luck
as there are start in the sky.
I which him so much luck and bliss
as drops rain from the sky.

I wish him all the best
as much as a tree has branches,
I wish him also a good night
because he always thought of me."

What pulled he from his finger?
A ring of pure fine gold.
He threw the ring into her lap,
she wept that the ring melted.

What pulled he from his pocket?
A handkerchief, washed very white.
"Dry off, dry off your eyes,
You shall henceforth be mine.

I only tempt you,
whether you would swear or curse;
if you had cursed or sworn,
I would have ridden away."

== Notes and references ==
Notes
