= The Fairy Tales of Hermann Hesse =

- First edition
- Author: Hermann Hesse
- Translator: Jack Zipes
- Language: English
- Genre: Short story collection
- Publisher: Bantam Books
- Publication date: 1995
- Publication place: United States
- Media type: Print (hardback)

The Fairy Tales of Hermann Hesse is a collection of 22 fairy tales written by Hermann Hesse between the years of 1904 and 1933. Translated by Jack Zipes, the collection was published in 1995 by Bantam Books. Many of the tales in the volume were translated and published in English for the first time.

Hesse opens each story with the feel of a traditional European fairy tale, then proceeds to alter the plot in a contemporary way, often weaving in elements of Eastern mysticism. Several were written during the First World War, which Hesse himself opposed as a pacifist, and incorporate themes of the period as well as the author's own preoccupation with mortality, the devastation of war, and the isolation of the misunderstood artist who plays the role of witness and critic.

Zipes notes in the introduction that the ogres of the tales are what Hesse regarded as the menaces of modern existence: "science, materialism, war, alienation, and philistinism."

== Stories ==
A list of the individual fairy tales and the year in which they were written follows:

- "The Dwarf", 1904
- "Shadow Play", 1906
- "A Man by the Name of Ziegler", 1908
- "The City", 1910
- "Dr. Knoegle’s End", 1910
- "The Beautiful Dream", 1912
- "The Three Linden Trees", 1912
- "Augustus", 1913
- "The Poet", 1913
- "Flute Dream", 1914
- "A Dream About the Gods", 1914
- "Strange News from Another Planet", 1915
- "Faldum", 1916
- "A Dream Sequence", 1916
- "The Forest Dweller", 1917
- "The Difficult Path", 1917
- "If the War Continues", 1917
- "The European", 1918
- "The Empire", 1918
- "The Painter", 1918
- "The Fairy Tale About the Wicker Chair", 1918
- "Iris", 1918

Eight of these stories also appeared in Strange News from Another Star (Märchen), a short story collection originally published in German in 1919 and in English in 1972, translated by Denver Lindley. The stories are:

- "Augustus"
- "The Poet"
- "Flute Dream"
- "Strange News from Another Planet" (titled "Strange News from Another Star")
- "The Difficult Path" (titled "The Hard Passage")
- "A Dream Sequence"
- "Faldum"
- "Iris"

== Reception ==
Booklist described Hesse's interpretations of the fairy tale genre as "lucid, captivating, and unusual", often with "heroes in search of self-knowledge and inner peace".

Publishers Weekly called Hesse's fairy tales "Quirky and evocative", arguing that "A refreshing lack of narrative closure distinguishes Hesse's tales, which mitigates an irritating tendency to equate self-knowledge with the return home to an eternal, spiritual mother."
