= The Three Linden Trees =

Short story

"The Three Linden Trees" (German: "Drei Linden") is a 1912 fairy tale by Hermann Hesse strongly influenced by the Greek legend of Damon and Pythias. The story, set in the medieval period, is a legend that accounts for three huge linden trees whose branches intertwine to cover the entire cemetery of the Hospital of the Holy Spirit in Berlin.

According to the story, three brothers care very deeply for each other. One day, the youngest brother comes across a blacksmith's apprentice who has just been stabbed to death. As he decides whether to tell the authorities or flee the scene, city constables find and arrest him for the murder. At his trial, evidence linking him to the victim emerges, and it appears he will be hanged, despite his protests of innocence.

Just then, the middle brother, who has been waiting for his younger brother to return home, hears what has happened. Not wanting to see his brother executed, he appears in court and confesses to the murder. He is locked up while the judge tries to determine who the real murderer is. Shortly after, the eldest brother returns home from his travels and, learning what happened to his two younger brothers, accuses himself of the crime. He, too, is arrested. When the youngest brother discovers what his two brothers have done on his behalf, he tearfully confesses to the judge that he is the murderer.

Not knowing whom to blame, the judge turns to the local prince. He does not believe any of the brothers is guilty, but realizes the decision is too significant to be left to chance. To resolve the problem, he announces that he will leave it up to God and comes up with an ordeal. Each of the brothers will plant a linden tree with its crown in the ground and its roots in the sky. Whose tree withered first would be considered the murderer.

Unexpectedly, all three trees began to grow and flourish. All three brothers were innocent, so all three trees thrived. These are the trees overhanging the cemetery outside the Hospital of the Holy Spirit.

The story was written in German and originally published in Die Alpen in 1912.

The story can be found in The Complete Fairy Tales of Hermann Hesse (1995).
