= Holy Trinity Icon =

Subject of icons in Eastern Orthodox Christianity

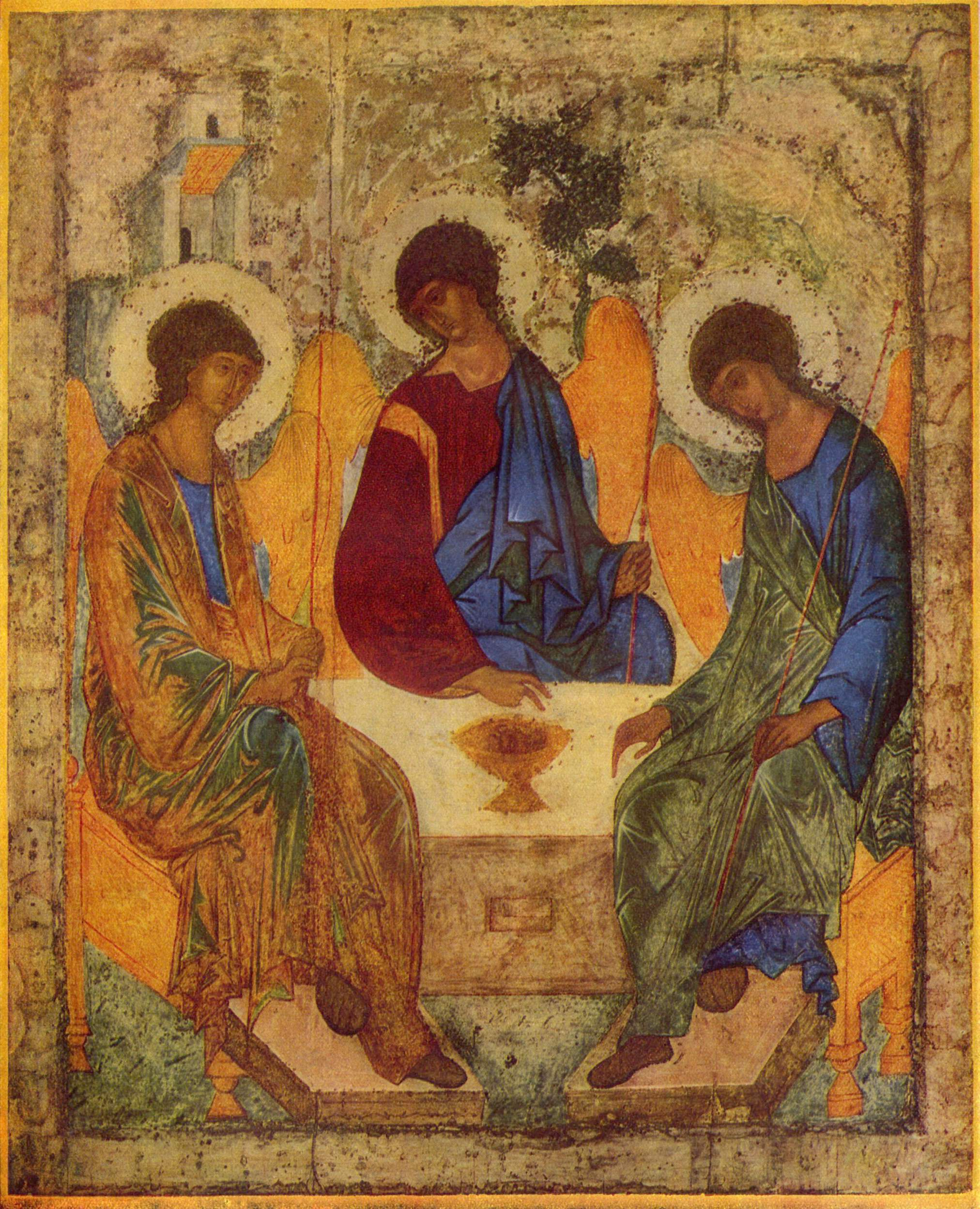
Russian icon of the Old Testament Trinity by Andrei Rublev, between 1408 and 1425

The Holy Trinity is an important subject of icons in Eastern Orthodox Christianity and is treated differently from depictions in Western Churches. There are two different types of Holy Trinity icons: the Old Testament Trinity and the New Testament Trinity (Троица Ветхозаветная and Троица Новозаветная in Russian).

== Old Testament Trinity ==
Although this is not its traditional title, this icon is sometimes called "Old Testament Trinity" because of its relationship to Genesis 18:1-15. In Genesis 18:1-15, three individuals appear to Abraham at the Oak of Mamre. The interpretation that this appearance is related to the Trinity is a Christian interpretation of the Hebrew scriptures. Consequently, the title of "Old Testament Trinity" interprets the Genesis narrative as much as it names the icon. From certain Christian theological perspectives, calling this icon "Old Testament Trinity" is a form of Supersessionism.

== New Testament Trinity ==
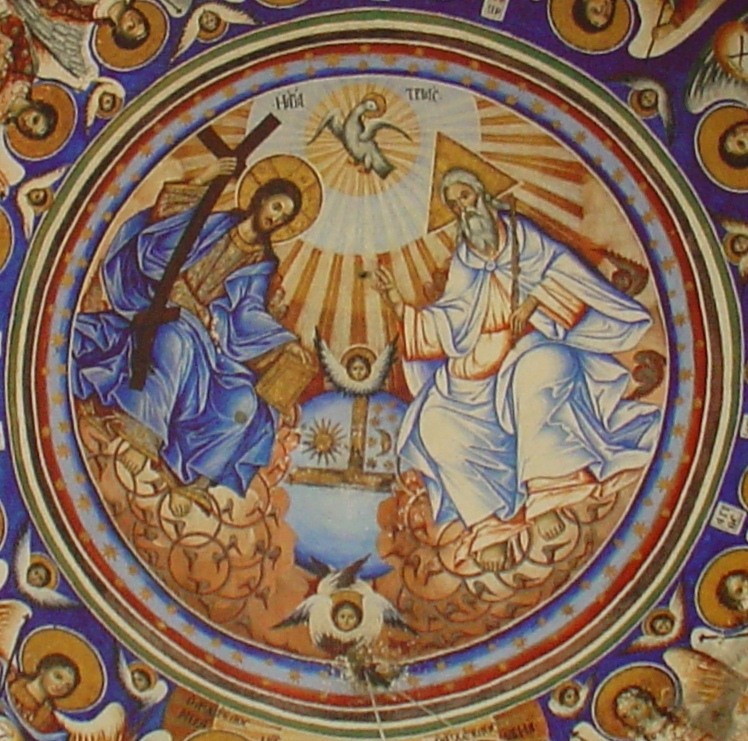
Greek Orthodox fresco of the "New Testament Trinity"

The "New Testament Trinity" depicts the Father, the Son and the Holy Spirit distinctly, and although far more familiar from Western models, is actually of Greek origin. Christ may be shown either as an adult (in this case, he is sitting to the right of his Father) or as an infant sitting on his Father's knees, which is the norm in early Greek depictions. This type, also called the Paternity icon, was found from the 11th century onwards. However, it did not become widespread in Orthodox art until after the Fall of Constantinople, under Western influence, when an adult Christ is the norm. The Father is painted as the Ancient of Days (as described in the Book of Daniel), a white-bearded man with a very special type of nimbus (it contains two rombic figures: one is red, another is blue, or is a triangle). The Holy Spirit is shown as a white dove with a halo of the same type as Father's. The dove may be placed between the Father and the Son (if they sit near each other at the same level), or the dove may be shown in a beam of light from the mouth of the Father, as if he sends the Holy Spirit.

Interestingly, depictions of God the Father are prohibited in Russian Orthodoxy. However, when the movement of antitrinitarians became strong in medieval Novgorod, a new type of iconography appeared: Spas Vethiy Denmi - The Savior Old with Days or Christ as the Ancient of Days. This icon type depicts Jesus Christ as an old, white-haired man. The basis of this iconography is consubstantiality - the doctrine that Jesus and the Father are one. This very image of God the Father is used in New Testament Trinity icons; until the Great Synod of Moscow in 1667, it was a matter of theological debate whether the Ancient of Days from the Book of Daniel was Christ or God the Father. In the Western churches, the Ancient of Days remains the basis and justification for depictions of God the Father, as made clear by, for example, a pronouncement by Pope Benedict XIV in 1745.

The Second Council of Nicea in 787 confirmed that the depiction of Christ was allowed because he became man; the situation regarding the Father was less clear. The usual Orthodox representation of the Trinity was through the "Old Testament Trinity" of the three angels visiting Abraham, said in the text to be "the Lord" (Genesis:18.1-15). However, post-Byzantine representations similar to those in the West are not uncommon in the Greek world. The subject remained sensitive for a long time, and the Russian Orthodox Church at the Great Synod of Moscow in 1667 finally forbade depictions of the Father in human form, although other Orthodox churches sometimes do not follow this ruling. The canon is quoted in full here because it explains the Russian Orthodox theology on the subject:

Chapter 2, §44: It is most absurd and improper to depict in icons the Lord Sabaoth (that is to say, God the Father) with a grey beard and the Only-Begotten Son in His bosom with a dove between them, because no-one has seen the Father according to His Divinity, and the Father has no flesh, nor was the Son born in the flesh from the Father before the ages. And though David the prophet says, "From the womb before the morning star have I begotten Thee" (Ps.109:3), that birth was not fleshly, but unspeakable and incomprehensible. For Christ Himself says in the holy Gospel, "No man hath seen the Father, save the Son" (cf. John 6:46). And Isaiah the prophet says in his fortieth chapter: "To whom have ye likened the Lord? and with what likeness have ye made a similitude of Him? Has not the artificier of wood made an image, or the goldsmiths, having melted gold, gilt it over, and made it a similitude?"(40:18–19). In like manner, the Apostle Paul says in the Acts (17:29), "Forasmuch then as we are the offspring of God, we ought not to think that the Godhead is like unto gold or silver or stone, graven by art of man's imagination." And John Damascene says: "But furthermore, who can make a similitude of the invisible, incorporeal, uncircumscribed and undepictable God? It is, then, uttermost insanity and impiety to give a form to the Godhead" (Orthodox Faith, 4:16). In like manner, St. Gregory the Dialogist prohibits this. For this reason, we should only form an understanding in the mind of Sabaoth, which is the Godhead, and of that birth before the ages of the Only-Begotten-Son from the Father, but we should never, in any wise, depict these in icons, for this, indeed, is impossible. And the Holy Spirit is not in essence a dove, but in essence he is God, and "No man hath seen God", as John the Theologian and Evangelist bears witness (1:18) and this is so even though, at the Jordan at Christ's holy Baptism the Holy Spirit appeared in the likeness of a dove. For this reason, it is fitting on this occasion only to depict the Holy Spirit in the likeness of a dove. But in any other place, those with intelligence will not depict the Holy Spirit in the likeness of a dove. For on Mount Tabor, He appeared as a cloud and, at another time, in other ways. Furthermore, Sabaoth is the name not only of the Father, but of the Holy Trinity. According to Dionysios the Areopagite, Lord Sabaoth, translated from the Jewish tongue, means "Lord of Hosts." This Lord of Hosts is the Holy Trinity, Father, Son and Holy Spirit. And although Daniel the prophet says he beheld the Ancient of Days sitting on a throne, this should not be understood to refer to the Father, but to the Son, who at His second coming will judge every nation at the dreadful Judgment.

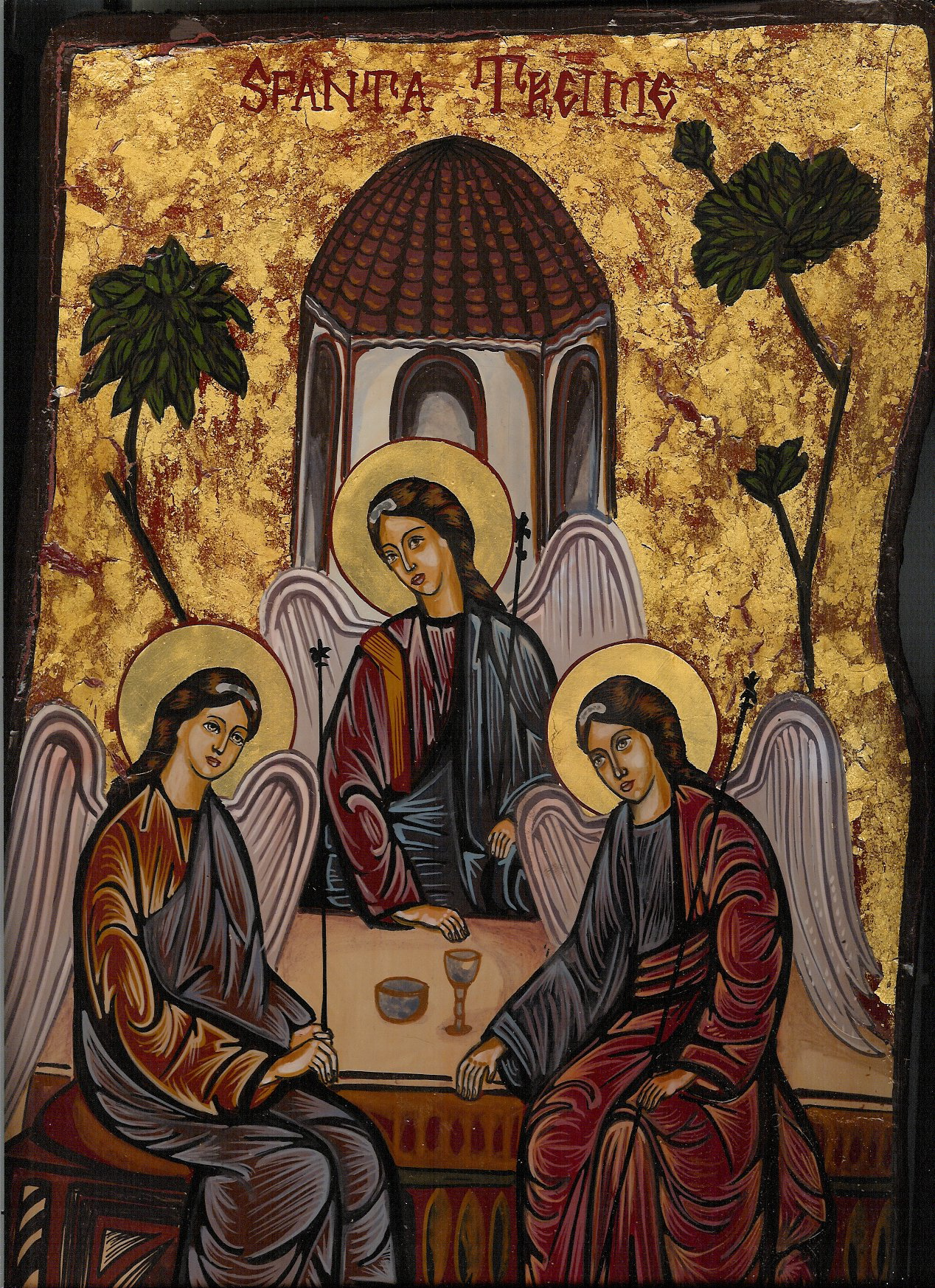
Modern Romanian icon of the Old Testament Trinity closely follows Rublev's iconography

The New Testament Trinity subject may actually be introduced into any icon where Christ is shown: for this purpose, the painter needs only to add the Father and the dove at the upper side of the icon.

The New Testament Trinity is not popular in official Orthodoxy in Russia nowadays, though it was popular in Novgorod earlier. Among Popovtsy Old Believers, this type of icon is very widespread, since the New Testament Trinity is depicted above any crucifixion icon (without the Son, since he is on the Cross in this case). The New Testament Trinity also appears on the wonder-working icon of Our Lady of Kursk (also without the Son, since in this case Mary holds him on her knees).

== See also ==
- God the Father in Western art
- Hand of God (art), the usual way of indicating the presence or approval of God in Byzantine art
