= Denver Lindley =

American translator

Denver Lindley (1904-1982) was an American translator noted for his translations of works by Thomas Mann, Hermann Hesse, Ernst Schnabel, André Maurois, and others. Lindley studied at Princeton University and joined Collier's magazine as an editor in 1927.

== Works Translated ==
- A Time to Love and a Time to Die (Translation of Zeit zu Leben und Zeit Zu Sterben by Erich Maria Remarque)
- Arch of Triumph (Translation of Arc de Triomphe by Erich Maria Remarque)
- Flotsam (Translation of Liebe Deinen Nächsten by Erich Maria Remarque)
- The Black Obelisk (Translation of Der schwarze Obelisk by Erich Maria Remarque)
- The Boat (Translation of Das Boot by Lothar-Günther Buchheim)
- The History of Jesus Christ Author, R. L. (Raymond Leopold) Bruckberger, The Viking Press, 1965.
- The Springtime of Life, Doubleday and Company, 1974. (Translation of Jean Dutourd, Le Printemps de la vie, Flammarion, 1972.)
