= God the Father in Western art =

Artistic representations of God the Father

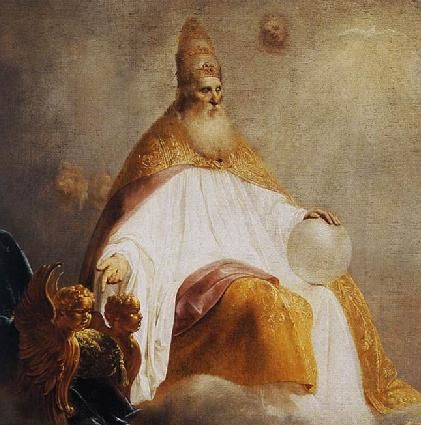
Depiction of God the Father (detail) offering the right hand throne to Christ, Pieter de Grebber, 1654. Utrecht, Museum Catharijneconvent. The orb, or the globe of the world, is almost exclusively associated with the Father in depictions of the Trinity.

For about a thousand years, in obedience to interpretations of specific Bible passages, pictorial depictions of God the Father had been avoided by Christian artists. At first only the Hand of God, often emerging from a cloud, was portrayed. Gradually, portrayals of the head and later the whole figure were depicted, and by the time of the Renaissance artistic representations of God the Father were freely used in the Western Church.

God the Father can be seen in some late Byzantine Cretan School icons, and ones from the borders of the Catholic and Orthodox worlds, under Western influence, but after the Russian Orthodox Church came down firmly against depicting the Father in 1667, he can hardly be seen in Russian art. Protestants generally disapprove of the depiction of God the Father, and originally did so strongly.

== Background and early history ==
Early Christians believed that the words of Exodus 33:20 "Thou canst not see my face: for there shall no man see Me and live" and of John 1:18: "No man hath seen God at any time" were meant to apply not only to the Father, but to all attempts at the depiction of the Father.

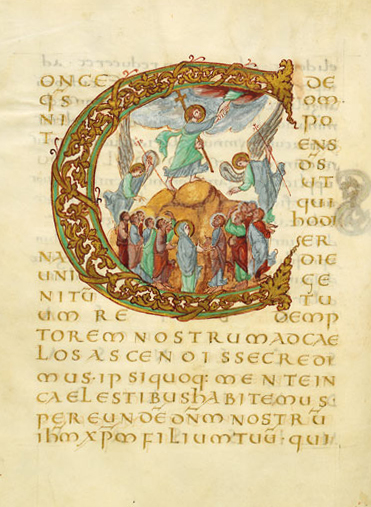
The Hand of God symbol in the Ascension from the Drogo Sacramentary, c. 850

The Hand of God, an artistic metaphor, is found several times in the only ancient synagogue with a large surviving decorative scheme, the Dura Europos Synagogue of the mid-3rd century, and was probably adopted into Early Christian art from Jewish art. It was common in Late Antique art in both East and West, and remained the main way of depicting the actions or approval of God the Father in the West until about the end of the Romanesque period. It also represents the bath Kol (literally "daughter of a voice") or voice of God, similar to Jewish depictions.

Historically considered, God the Father is more frequently manifested in the Old Testament, while the Son is manifested in the New Testament. Hence it might be said that the Old Testament refers more especially to the history of the Father and the New Testament to that of the Son. Yet, in early depictions of scenes from the Old Testament, artists used the conventional depiction of Jesus to represent the Father, especially in depictions of the story of Adam and Eve, the most frequently depicted Old Testament narrative shown in Early Medieval art, and one that was felt to require the depiction of a figure of God "walking in the garden" (Genesis 3:8).

The account in Genesis naturally credits the Creation to the single figure of God, in Christian terms, God the Father. However the first person plural in Genesis 1:26 "Let Us make man in Our image, according to Our likeness", and New Testament references to Christ as Creator (John 1:3, Colossians 1:15) led Early Christian writers to associate the Creation with the Logos, or pre-existing Christ, God the Son. From the 4th century the Church was also keen to affirm the doctrine of consubstantiality confirmed in the Nicene Creed in 325.

It was therefore usual to have depictions of Jesus as Logos taking the place of the Father and creating the world alone, or commanding Noah to construct the ark or speaking to Moses from the Burning bush. There was also a brief period in the 4th century when the Trinity were depicted as three near-identical figures, mostly in depicting scenes from Genesis; the Dogmatic Sarcophagus in the Vatican is the best known example. In isolated cases this iconography is found throughout the Middle Ages, and revived somewhat from the 15th century, though it attracted increasing disapproval from ecclesial authorities. A variant is Enguerrand Quarton's contract for the Coronation of the Virgin requiring him to represent the Father and Son of the Holy Trinity as identical figures.

One scholar has suggested that the enthroned figure in the centre of the apse mosaic of Santa Pudenziana in Rome of 390420, normally regarded as Christ, in fact represents God the Father.

In situations, such as the Baptism of Christ, where a specific representation of God the Father was indicated, the Hand of God was used, with increasing freedom from the Carolingian period until the end of the Romanesque. This motif now, since the discovery of the 3rd-century Dura Europos synagogue, seems to have been borrowed from Jewish art, and is found in Christian art almost from its beginnings.

The use of religious images in general continued to increase up to the end of the 7th century, to the point that in 695, upon assuming the throne, Byzantine emperor Justinian II put an image of Christ on the obverse side of his gold coins, resulting in a rift which ended the use of Byzantine coin types in the Islamic world. However, the increase in religious imagery did not include depictions of God the Father. For instance, while the 82nd canon of the Council of Trullo in 692 did not specifically condemn images of the Father, it suggested that icons of Christ were preferred over Old Testament shadows and figures.

The beginning of the 8th century witnessed the suppression and destruction of religious icons as the period of Byzantine iconoclasm (literally image-breaking) started. Emperor Leo III (717–741) suppressed the use of icons by imperial edict, presumably due to a military loss which he attributed to the undue veneration of icons. The edict, which the emperor issued without consulting the Church, forbade the veneration of religious images but did not apply to other forms of art, including the image of the emperor, or religious symbols such as the cross. Theological arguments against icons then began to appear with iconoclasts arguing that icons could not represent both the divine and the human natures of Jesus at the same time. In this atmosphere, no public depictions of God the Father were even attempted and such depictions only began to appear two centuries later.

== The end of iconoclasm ==
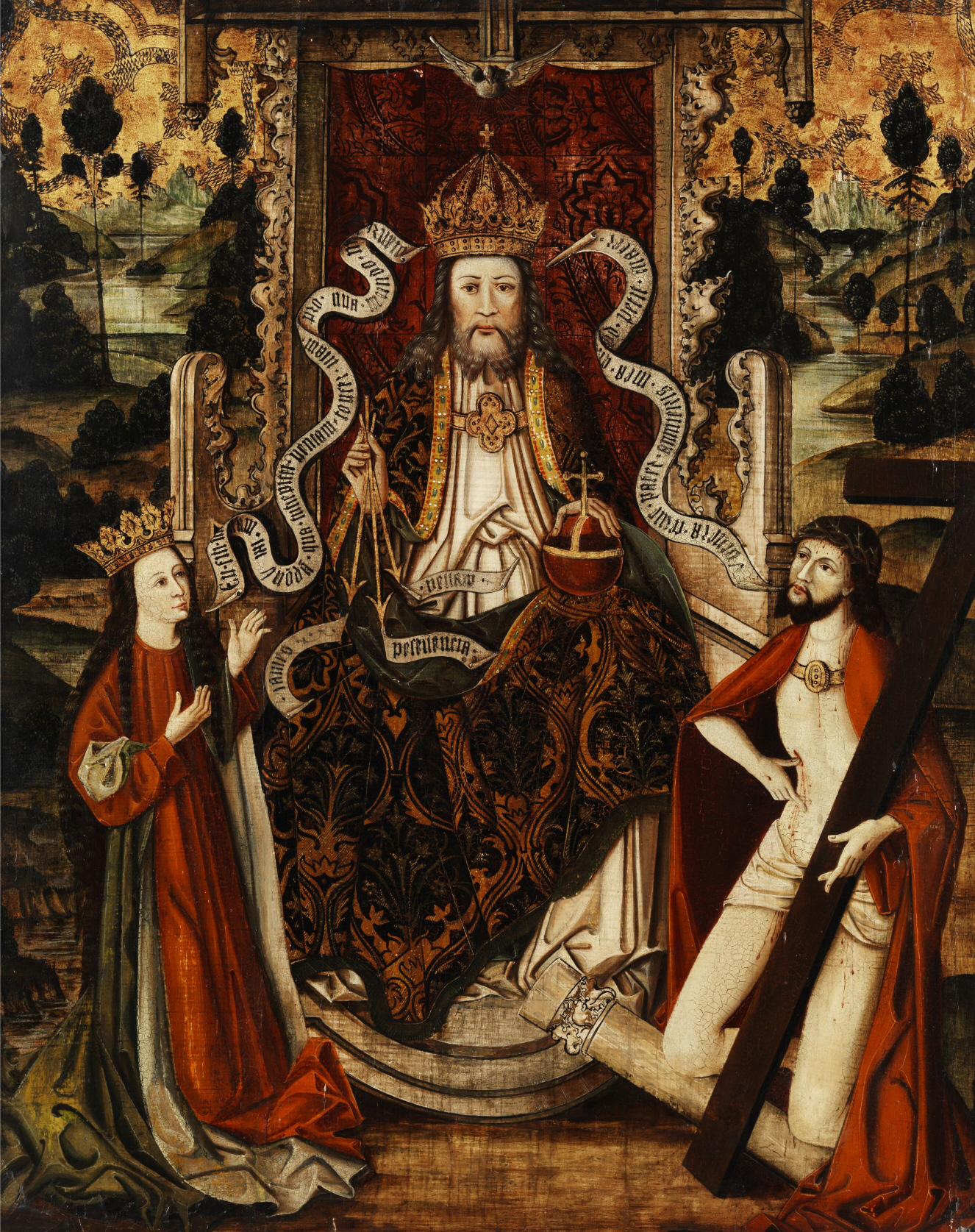
God the Father on a throne, with the Virgin Mary and Jesus, Westphalia, Germany, late 15th century.

The Second Council of Nicaea in 787 effectively ended the first period of Byzantine iconoclasm and restored the honouring of icons and holy images in general. However, this did not immediately translate into large scale depictions of God the Father. Even supporters of the use of icons in the 8th century, such as Saint John of Damascus, drew a distinction between images of God the Father and those of Christ.

In his treatise On the Divine Images John of Damascus wrote: "In former times, God who is without form or body, could never be depicted. But now when God is seen in the flesh conversing with men, I make an image of the God whom I see". The implication here is that insofar as God the Father or the Spirit did not become man, visible and tangible, images and portrait icons can not be depicted. So what was true for the whole Trinity before Christ remains true for the Father and the Spirit but not for the Word. John of Damascus wrote:

If we attempt to make an image of the invisible God, this would be sinful indeed. It is impossible to portray one who is without body: invisible, uncircumscribed and without form.

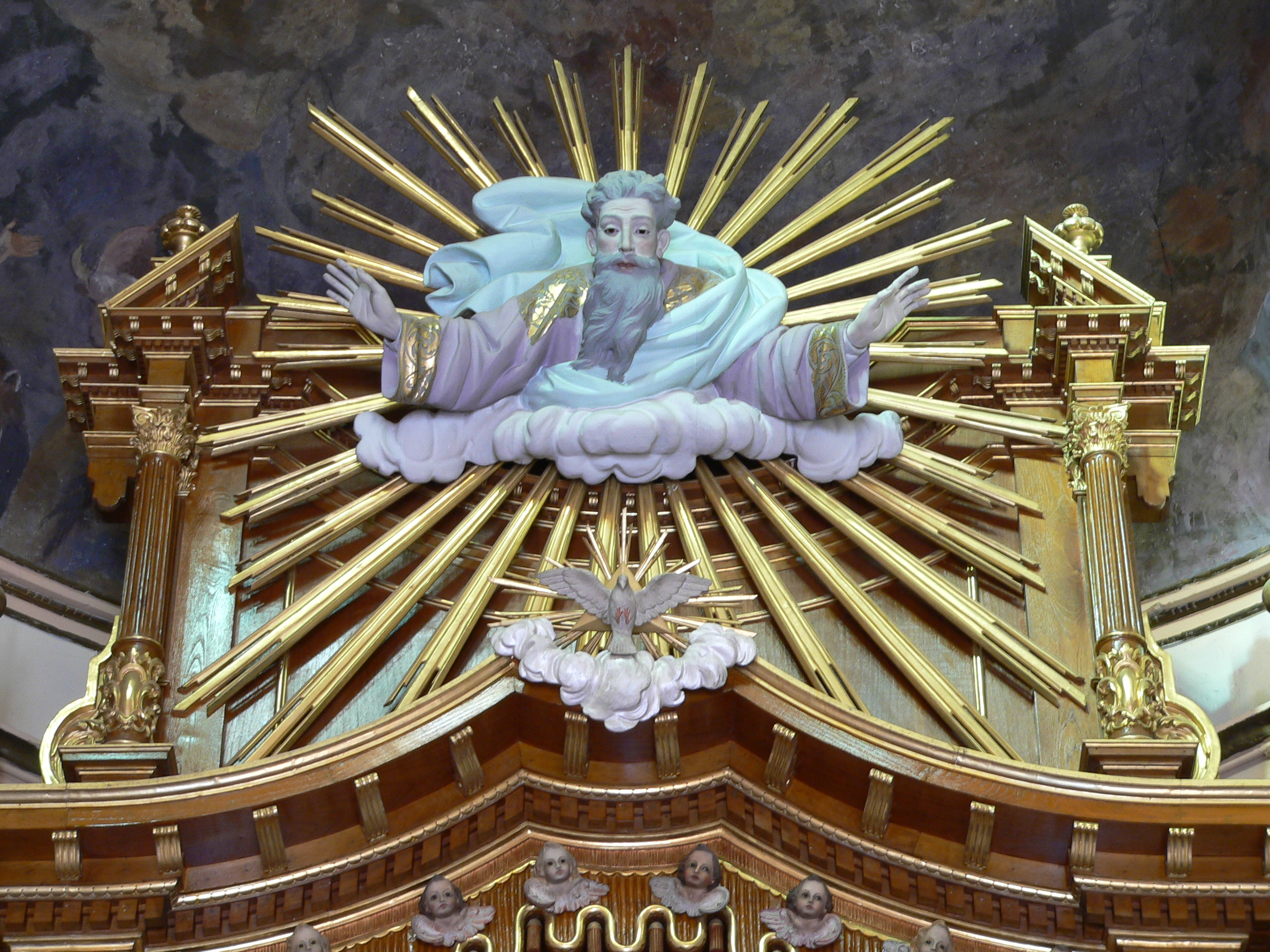
Calvary hermitage, Alcora, Spain, 18th century.

Around 790 Charlemagne ordered a set of four books that became known as the Libri Carolini (i.e. "Charles' books") to refute what his court mistakenly understood to be the iconoclast decrees of the Byzantine Second Council of Nicaea regarding sacred images. Although not well known during the Middle Ages, these books describe the key elements of the Catholic theological position on sacred images. To the Western Church, images were just objects made by craftsmen, to be utilized for stimulating the senses of the faithful, and to be respected for the sake of the subject represented, not in themselves.

The Council of Constantinople (869) (considered ecumenical by the Western Church, but not the Eastern Church) reaffirmed the decisions of the Second Council of Nicaea and helped stamp out any remaining coals of iconoclasm. Specifically, its third canon required the image of Christ to have veneration equal with that of a Gospel book:

We decree that the sacred image of our Lord Jesus Christ, the liberator and Savior of all people, must be venerated with the same honor as is given the book of the holy Gospels. For as through the language of the words contained in this book all can reach salvation, so, due to the action which these images exercise by their colors, all wise and simple alike, can derive profit from them.

But images of God the Father were not directly addressed in Constantinople in 869. A list of permitted icons was enumerated at this Council, but images of God the Father were not among them. However, the general acceptance of icons and holy images began to create an atmosphere in which God the Father could be depicted.

== Middle ages to the Renaissance ==
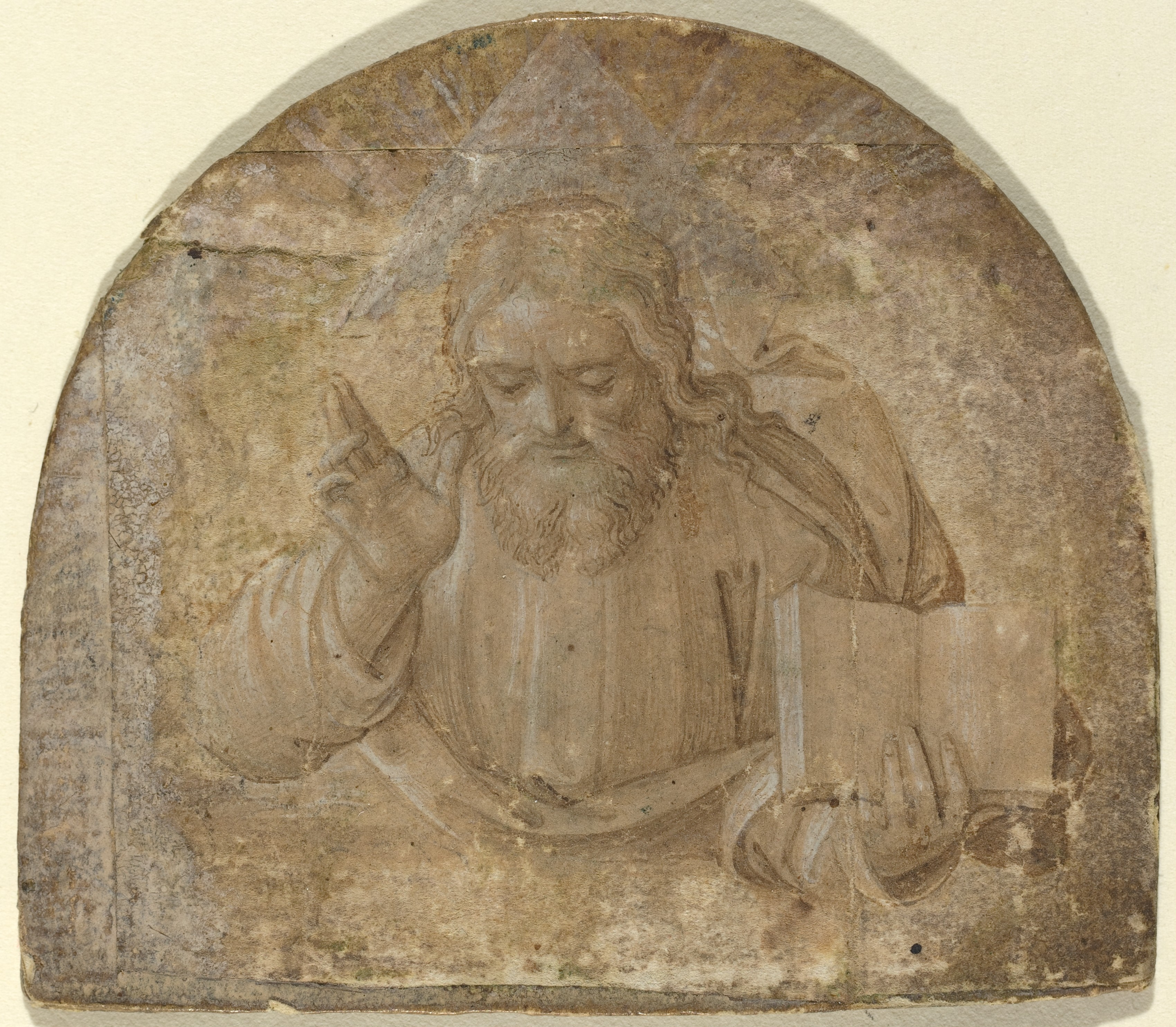
God the Father with His Right Hand Raised in Blessing, with a triangular halo representing the Trinity, Girolamo dai Libri c. 1555.

Prior to the 10th century no attempt was made to represent a separate depiction as a full human figure of God the Father in Western art. Yet, Western art eventually required some way to illustrate the presence of the Father, so through successive representations a set of artistic styles for the depiction of the Father in human form gradually emerged around the 10th century AD.

It appears that when early artists designed to represent God the Father, fear and awe restrained them from a delineation of the whole person. Typically only a small part would be represented, usually the hand, or sometimes the face, but rarely the whole person. In many images, the figure of the Son supplants the Father, so a smaller portion of the person of the Father is depicted.

By the 12th century depictions of God the Father had started to appear in French illuminated manuscripts, which as a less public form could often be more adventurous in their iconography, and in stained glass church windows in England. Initially the head or bust was usually shown in some form of frame of clouds in the top of the picture space, where the Hand of God had formerly appeared; the Baptism of Christ on the famous baptismal font in Liège of Rainer of Huy is an example from 1118 (a Hand of God is used in another scene). Gradually the amount of the body shown can increase to a half-length figure, then a full-length, usually enthroned, as in Giotto's fresco of c. 1305 in Padua. In the 14th century the Naples Bible carried a depiction of God the Father in the Burning bush. By the early 15th century, the Très Riches Heures du Duc de Berry has a considerable number of images, including an elderly but tall and elegant full-length figure walking in the Garden of Eden (gallery), which show a considerable diversity of apparent ages and dress. The "Gates of Paradise" of the Florence Baptistry by Lorenzo Ghiberti, begun in 1425 show a similar tall full-length Father. The Rohan Book of Hours of about 1430 also included depictions of God the Father in half-length human form, which were now becoming standard, and the Hand of God becoming rarer. At the same period other works, like the large Genesis altarpiece by the Hamburg painter Meister Bertram, continued to use the old depiction of Christ as Logos in Genesis scenes. In the 15th century there was a brief fashion for depicting all three persons of the Trinity as similar or identical figures with the usual appearance of Christ.

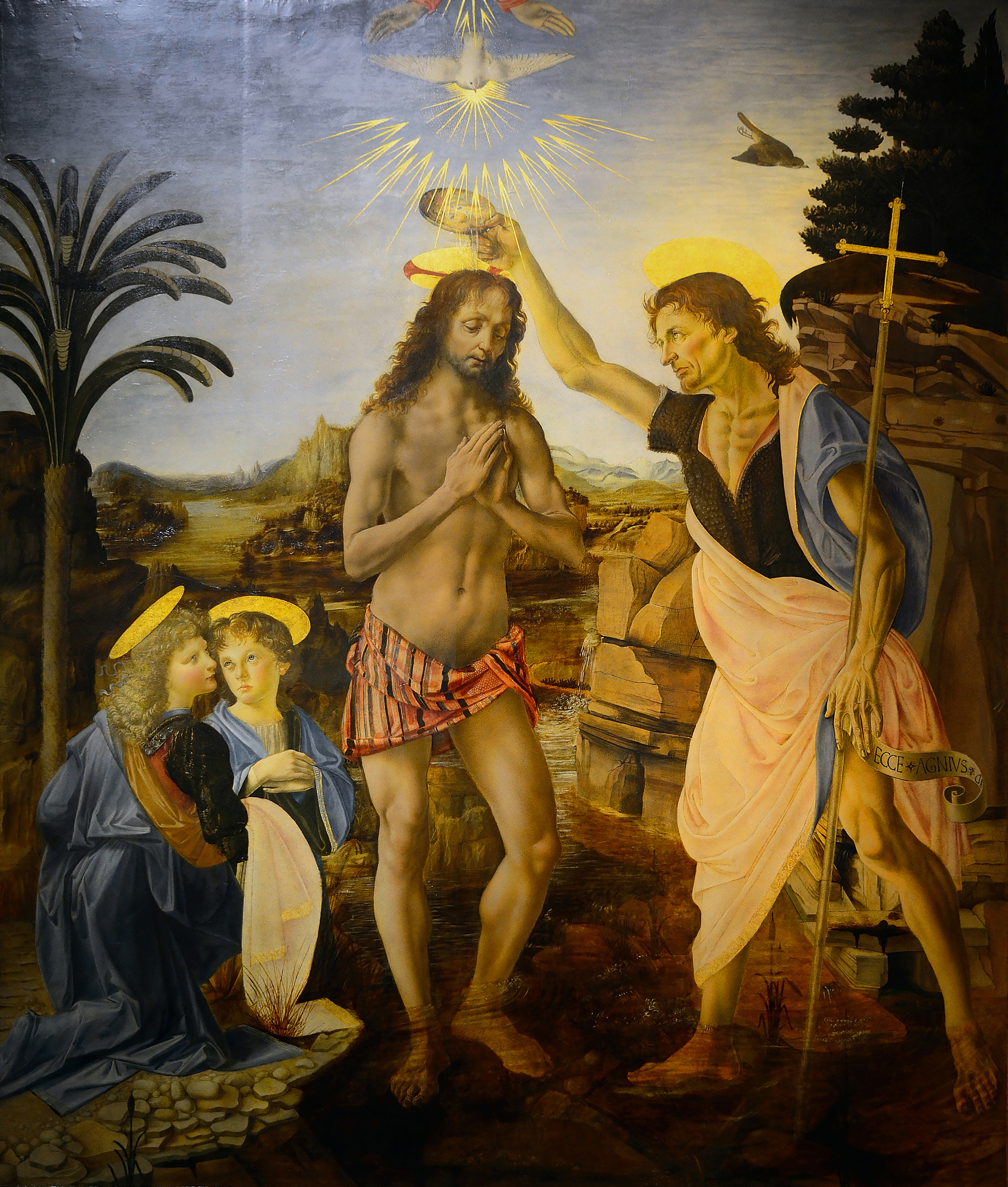
Two "Hands of God" (relatively unusual) and the Holy Spirit as a dove in Baptism of Christ, by Verrocchio, 1472.

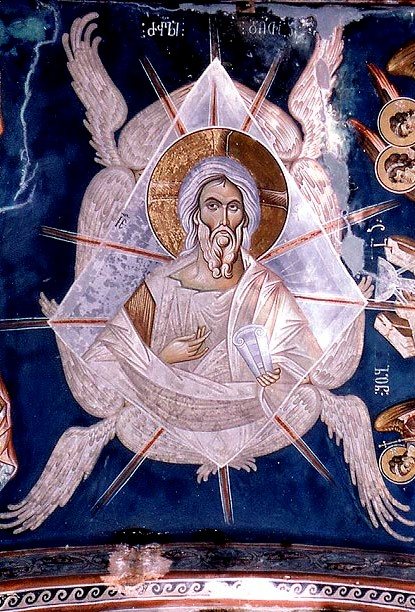
The Ancient of Days, a 14th-century fresco from Ubisi, Georgia.

In an early Venetian school Coronation of the Virgin by Giovanni d'Alemagna and Antonio Vivarini, (c. 1443) (see gallery below) the Father is shown in the representation consistently used by other artists later, namely as a patriarch, with benign, yet powerful countenance and with long white hair and a beard, a depiction largely derived from, and justified by, the description of the Ancient of Days in the Old Testament, the nearest approach to a physical description of God in the Old Testament:

. ...the Ancient of Days did sit, whose garment was white as snow, and the hair of his head like the pure wool: his throne was like the fiery flame, and his wheels as burning fire. (Daniel 7:9)

In the Annunciation by Benvenuto di Giovanni in 1470, God the Father is portrayed in the red robe and a hat that resembles that of a Cardinal. However, even in the later part of the 15th century, the representation of the Father and the Holy Spirit as "hands and dove" continued, e.g. in Verrocchio's Baptism of Christ in 1472.

In Renaissance paintings of the adoration of the Trinity, God may be depicted in two ways, either with emphasis on The Father, or the three elements of the Trinity. The most usual depiction of the Trinity in Renaissance art depicts God the Father as an old man, usually with a long beard and patriarchal in appearance, sometimes with a triangular halo (as a reference to the Trinity), or with a papal tiara, specially in Northern Renaissance painting. In these depictions The Father may hold a globe or book. He is behind and above Christ on the Cross in the Throne of Mercy iconography. A dove, the symbol of the Holy Spirit may hover above. Various people from different classes of society, e.g. kings, popes or martyrs may be present in the picture. In a Trinitarian Pietà, God the Father is often shown wearing a papal dress and a papal tiara, supporting the dead Christ in his arms. They float in heaven with angels who carry the instruments of the Passion.

The orb, or the globe of the world, is rarely shown with the other two persons of the Trinity and is almost exclusively restricted to God the Father, but is not a definite indicator since it is sometimes used in depictions of Christ. A book, although often depicted with the Father is not an indicator of the Father and is also used with Christ.

== From Renaissance to Baroque ==
Representations of God the Father and the Trinity were attacked both by Protestants and within Catholicism, by the Jansenist and Baianist movements as well as more orthodox theologians. As with other attacks on Catholic imagery, this had the effect both of reducing Church support for the less central depictions, and strengthening it for the core ones. In the Western Church, the pressure to restrain religious imagery resulted in the highly influential decrees of the final session of the Council of Trent in 1563. The Council of Trent decrees confirmed the traditional Catholic doctrine that images only represented the person depicted, and that veneration to them was paid to the person, not the image.

Artistic depictions of God the Father were uncontroversial in Catholic art thereafter, but less common depictions of the Trinity were condemned. In 1745 Pope Benedict XIV explicitly supported the Throne of Mercy depiction, referring to the "Ancient of Days", but in 1786 it was still necessary for Pope Pius VI to issue a papal bull condemning the decision of an Italian church council to remove all images of the Trinity from churches.

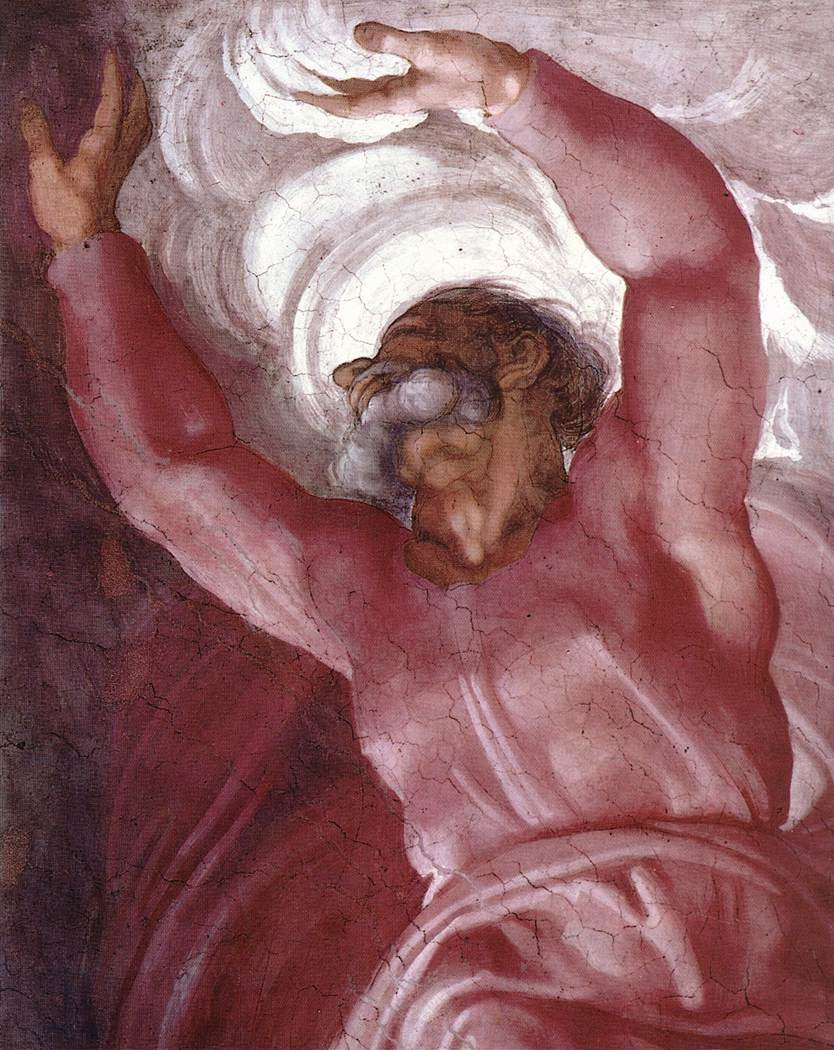
Separation of Light from Darkness, by Michelangelo, c. 1512.

God the Father appears in several Genesis scenes in Michelangelo's Sistine Chapel ceiling, most famously The Creation of Adam. God the Father is depicted as a powerful figure, floating in the clouds in Titian's Assumption of the Virgin (see gallery below) in the Frari of Venice, long admired as a masterpiece of High Renaissance art. The Church of the Gesù in Rome includes a number of 16th-century depictions of God the Father. In some of these paintings the Trinity is still alluded to in terms of three angels, but Giovanni Battista Fiammeri also depicted God the Father riding on a cloud, above the scenes.

In both the Last Judgment and the Coronation of the Virgin paintings by Rubens (see gallery below) he depicted God the Father in the form that by then had become widely accepted, as a bearded patriarchal figure above the fray. In the 17th century, the two Spanish artists Velázquez (whose father-in-law Francisco Pacheco was in charge of the approval of new images for the Inquisition) and Murillo both depicted God the Father as a patriarchal figure with a white beard (see gallery below) in a purple robe.

While representations of God the Father were growing in Italy, Spain, Germany and the Low Countries, there was resistance elsewhere in Europe, even during the 17th century. In 1632 most members of the Star Chamber court in England (except the Archbishop of York) condemned the use of the images of the Trinity in church windows, and some considered them illegal. Later in the 17th century Sir Thomas Browne wrote that he considered the depiction of God the Father as an old man "a dangerous act" that might lead to Egyptian symbolism. In 1847, Charles Winston was still critical of such images as a "Romish trend" (a term used to refer to Roman Catholics) that he considered best avoided in England.

In 1667 the 43rd chapter of the Great Moscow Council specifically included a ban on a number of depictions of God the Father and the Holy Spirit, which then also resulted in a whole range of other icons being placed on the forbidden list, mostly affecting Western-style depictions which had been gaining ground in Orthodox icons. The Council also declared that the person of the Trinity who was the "Ancient of Days" was Christ, as Logos, not God the Father. However some icons continued to be produced in Russia, as well as Greece, Romania, and other Orthodox countries.

== Gallery of art ==
=== 15th century ===
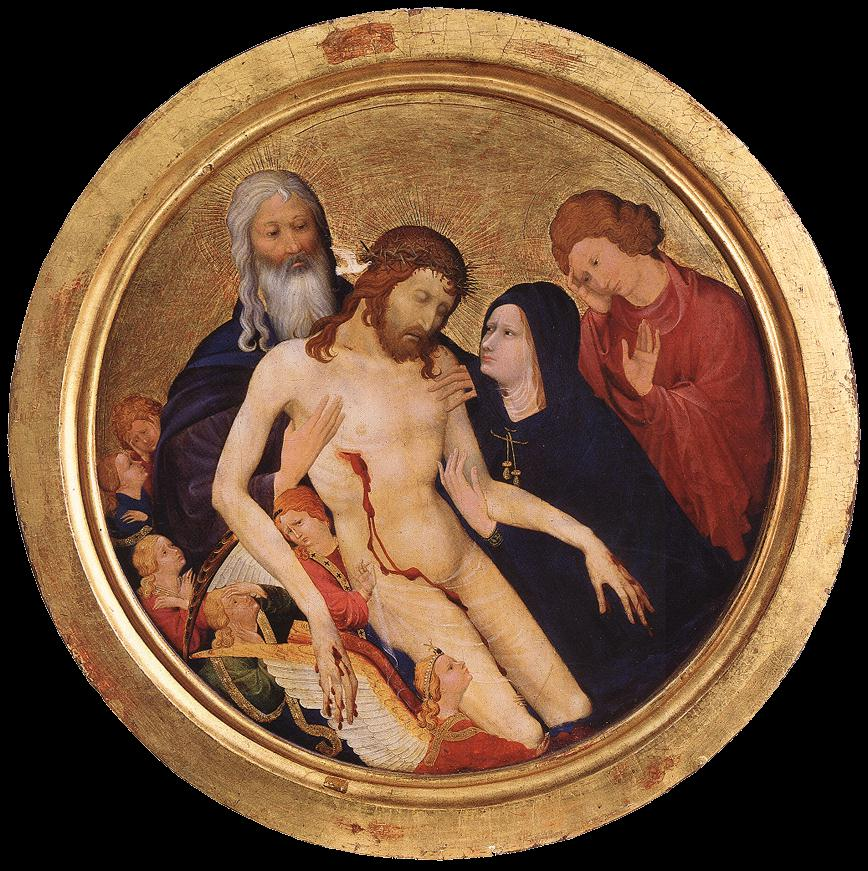
Pietà with God the Father and the dove of the Holy Spirit, Jean Malouel 1400–1410

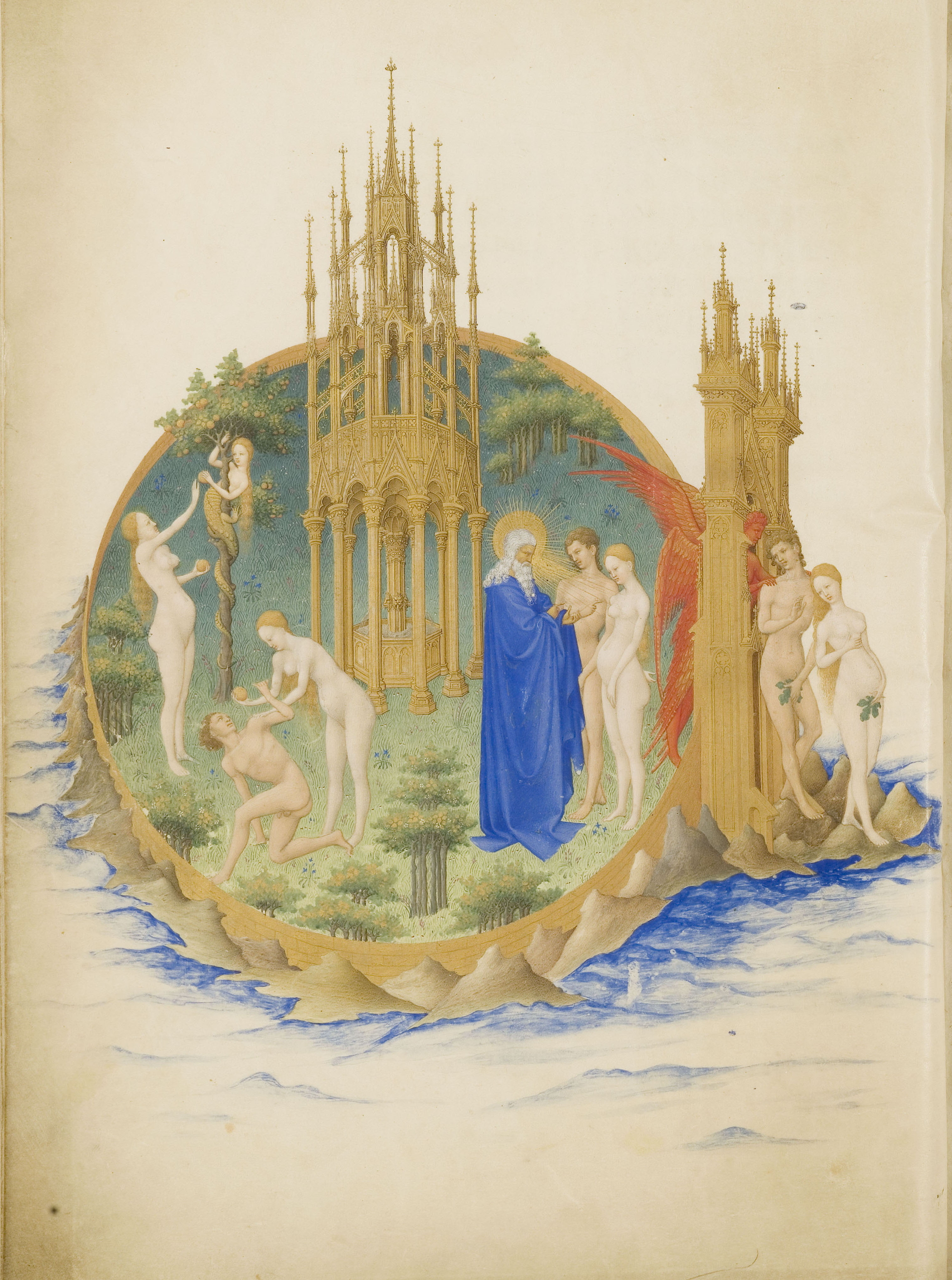
Limbourg Brothers, 1410–15, in the Très Riches Heures du Duc de Berry

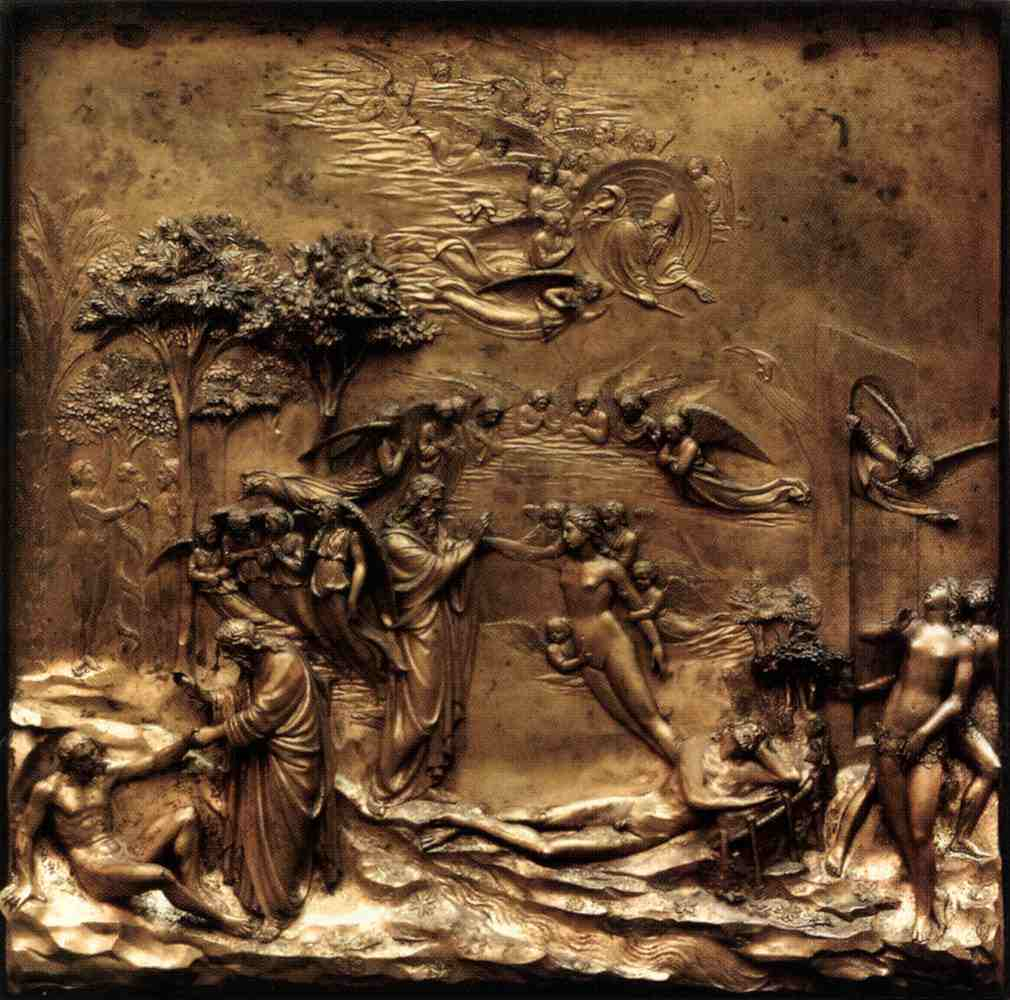
Creation of Adam and Eve, Lorenzo Ghiberti, about 1425, Florence Baptistery

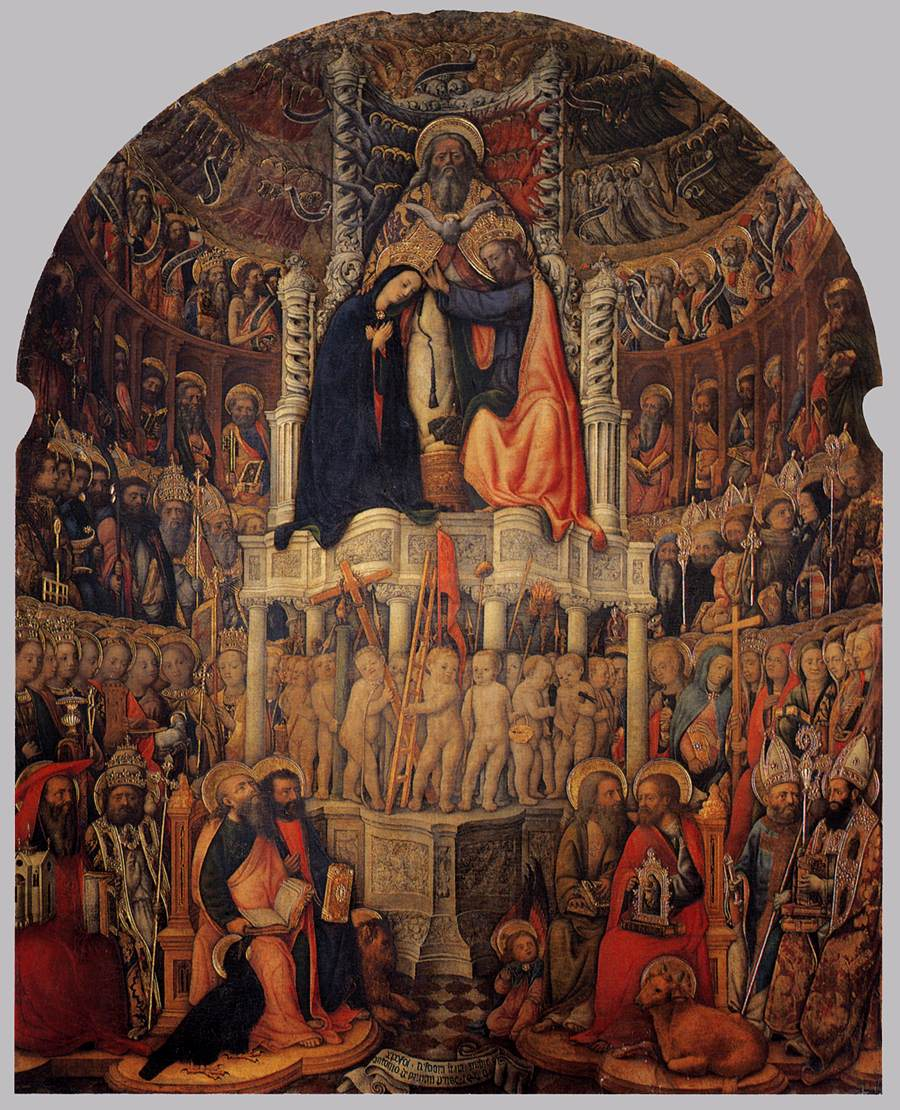
Giovanni d'Alemagna and Antonio Vivarini, c. 1443

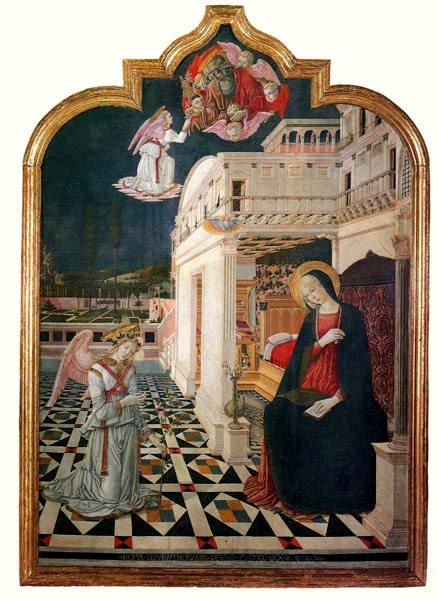
Benvenuto di Giovanni, 1470

Pietro Perugino, Annunciation, 1489

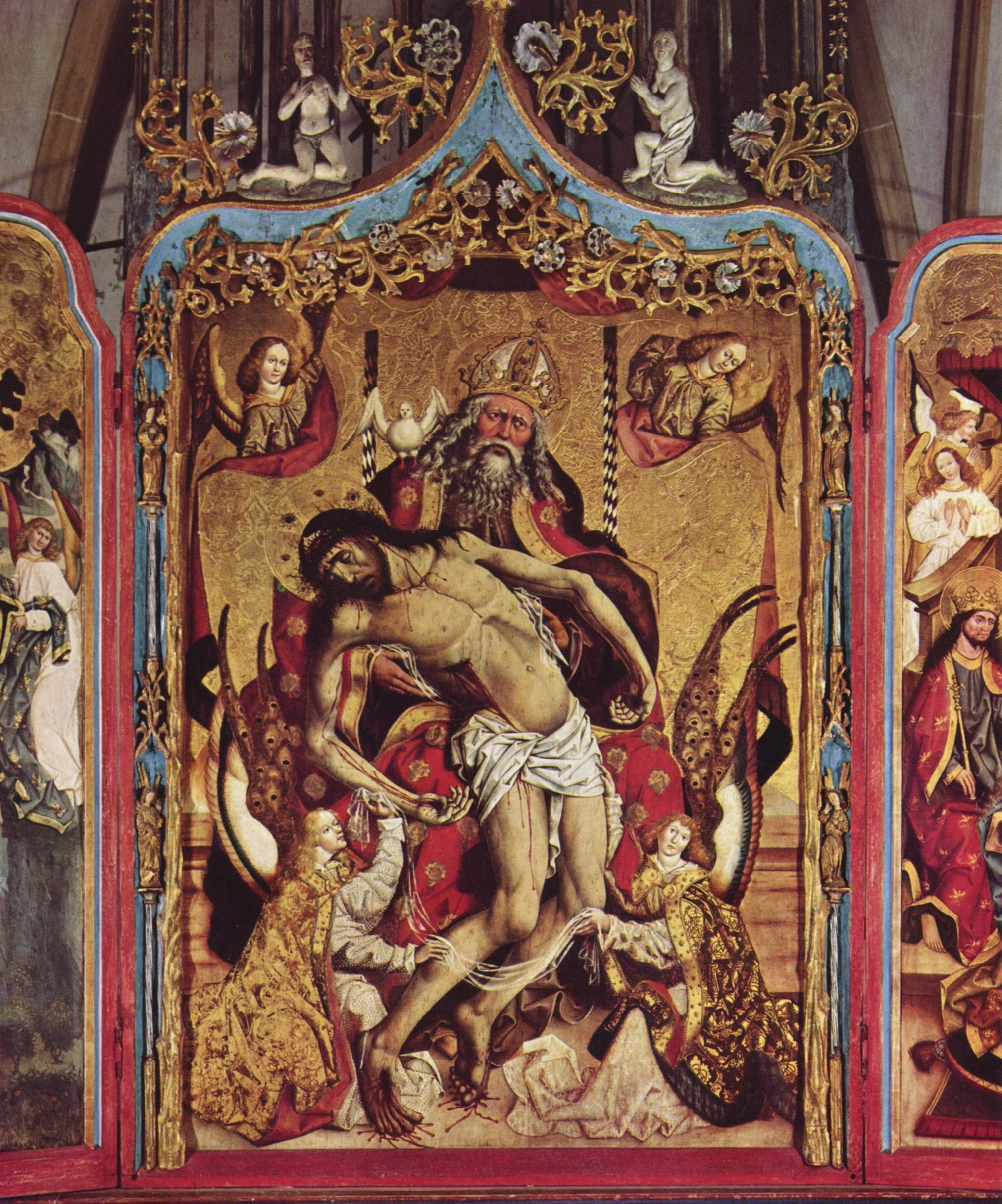
Gottes Not, a German Pietà-like variant of the Throne of Mercy, Jan Polack, 1491

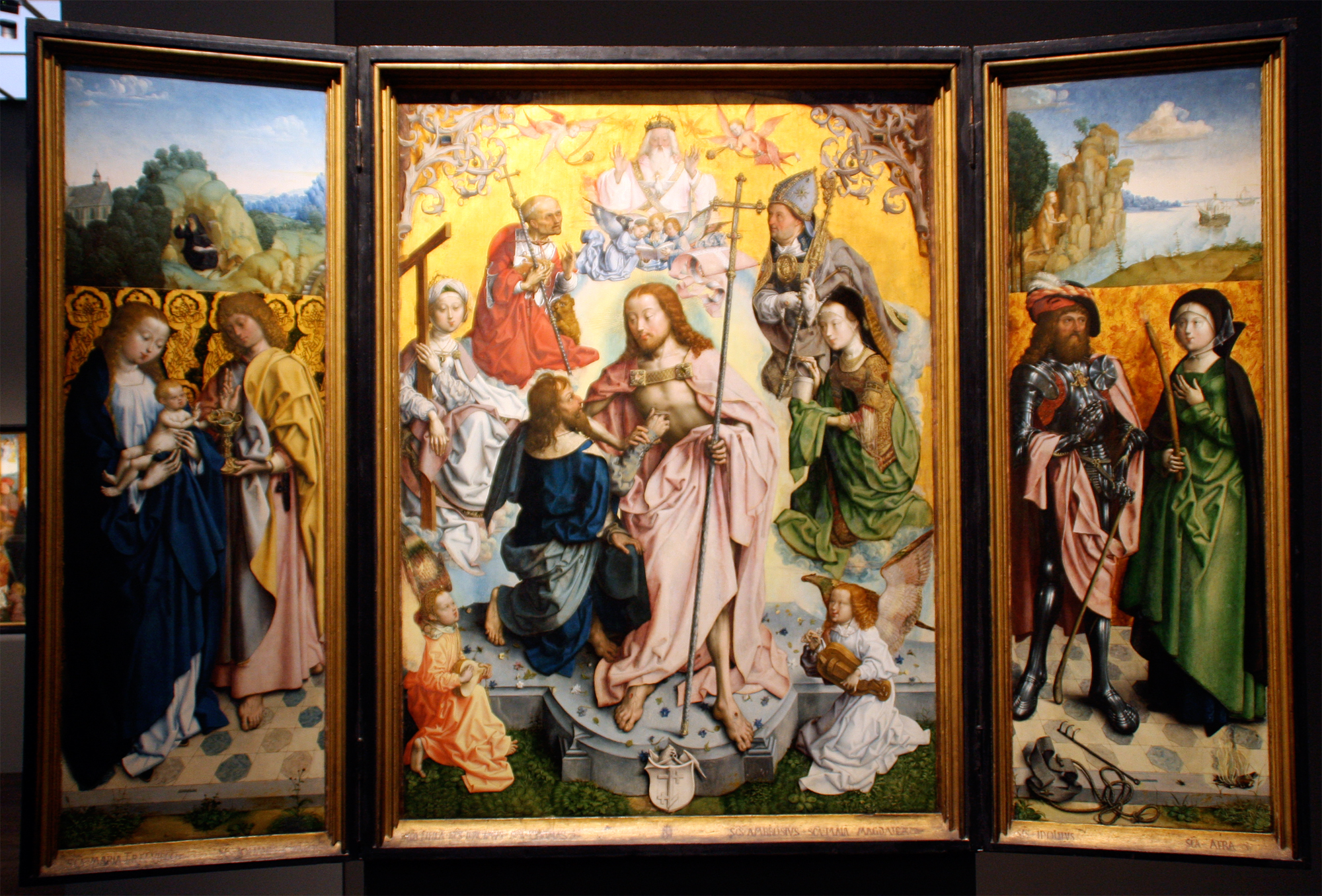
Master of the Saint Bartholomew Altarpiece, 1495

=== 16th century ===
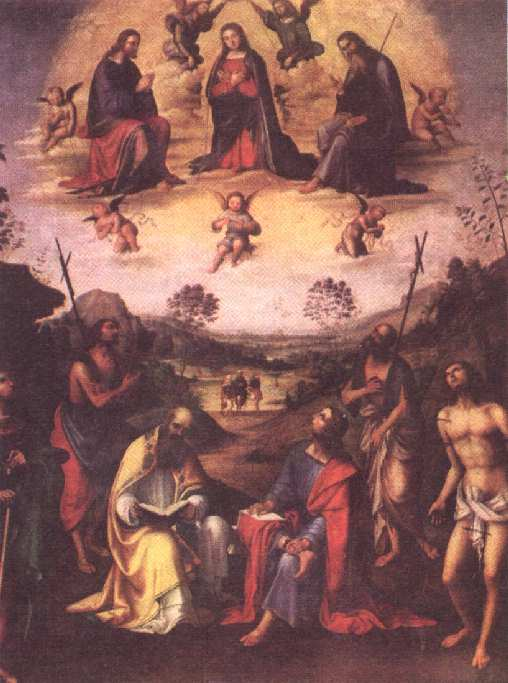
Lorenzo Costa, Crowning of the Virgin and saints, 1501

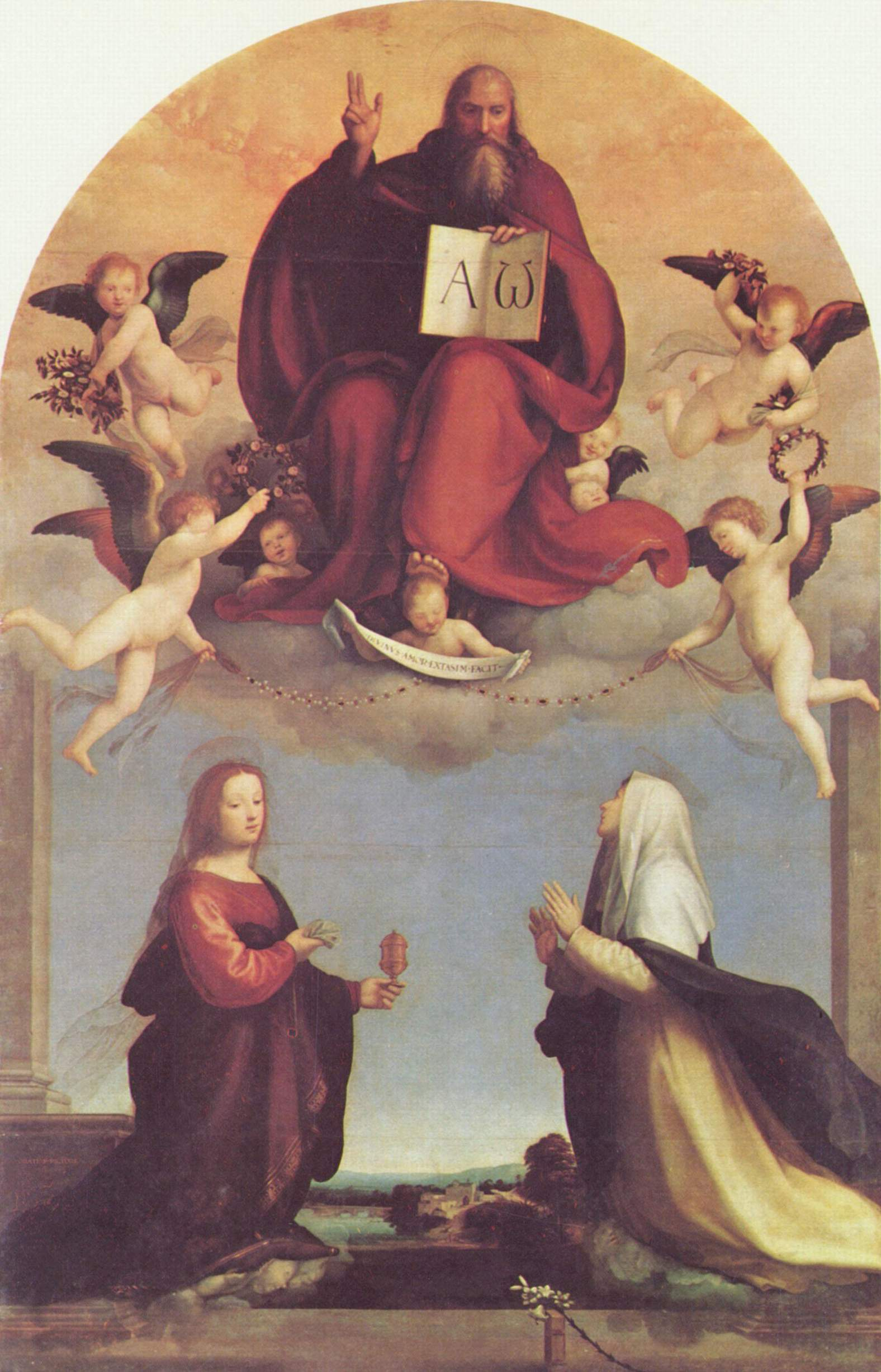
Fra Bartolomeo, 1509

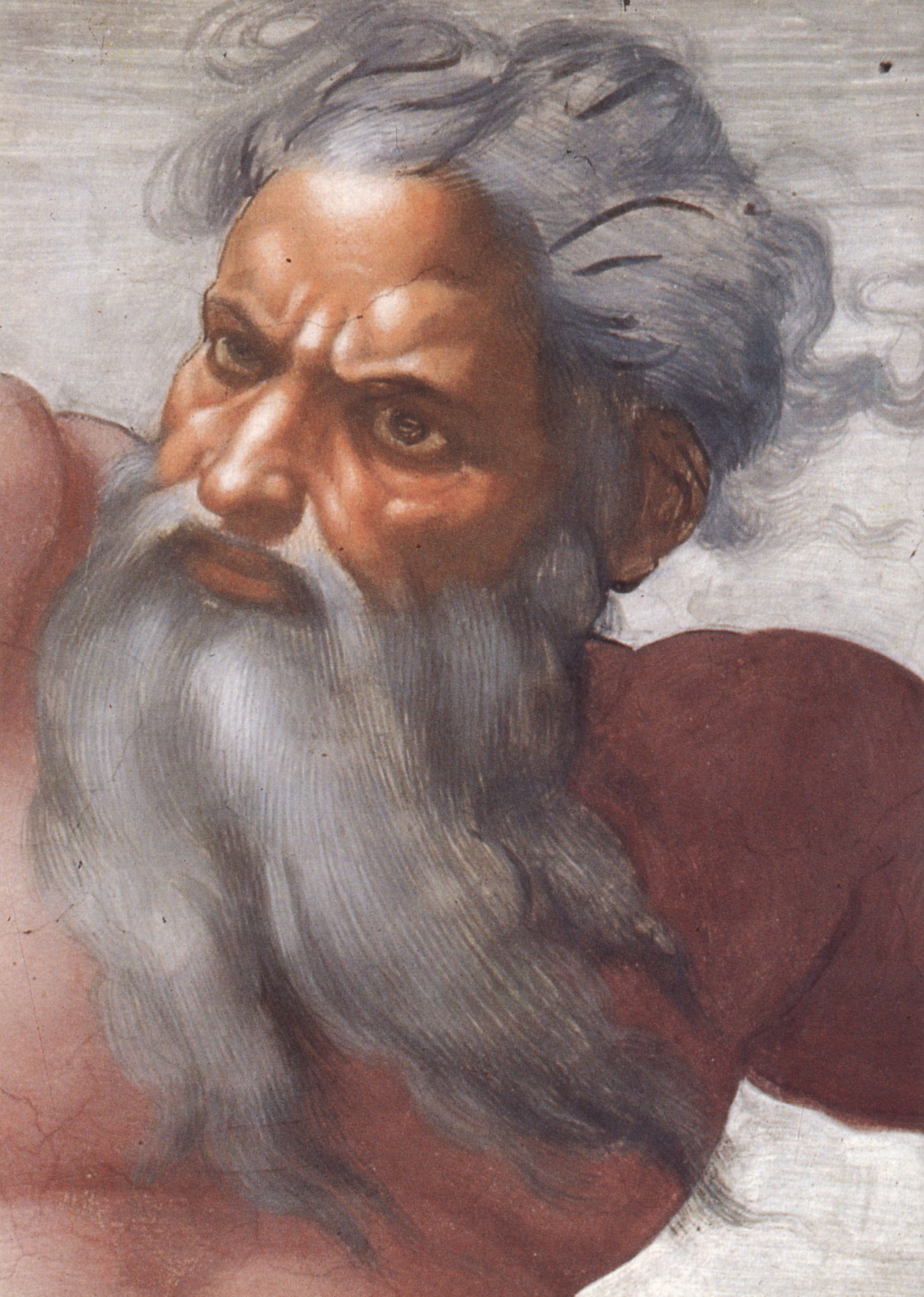
Michelangelo, Creation of the Sun and Moon (detail), 1511

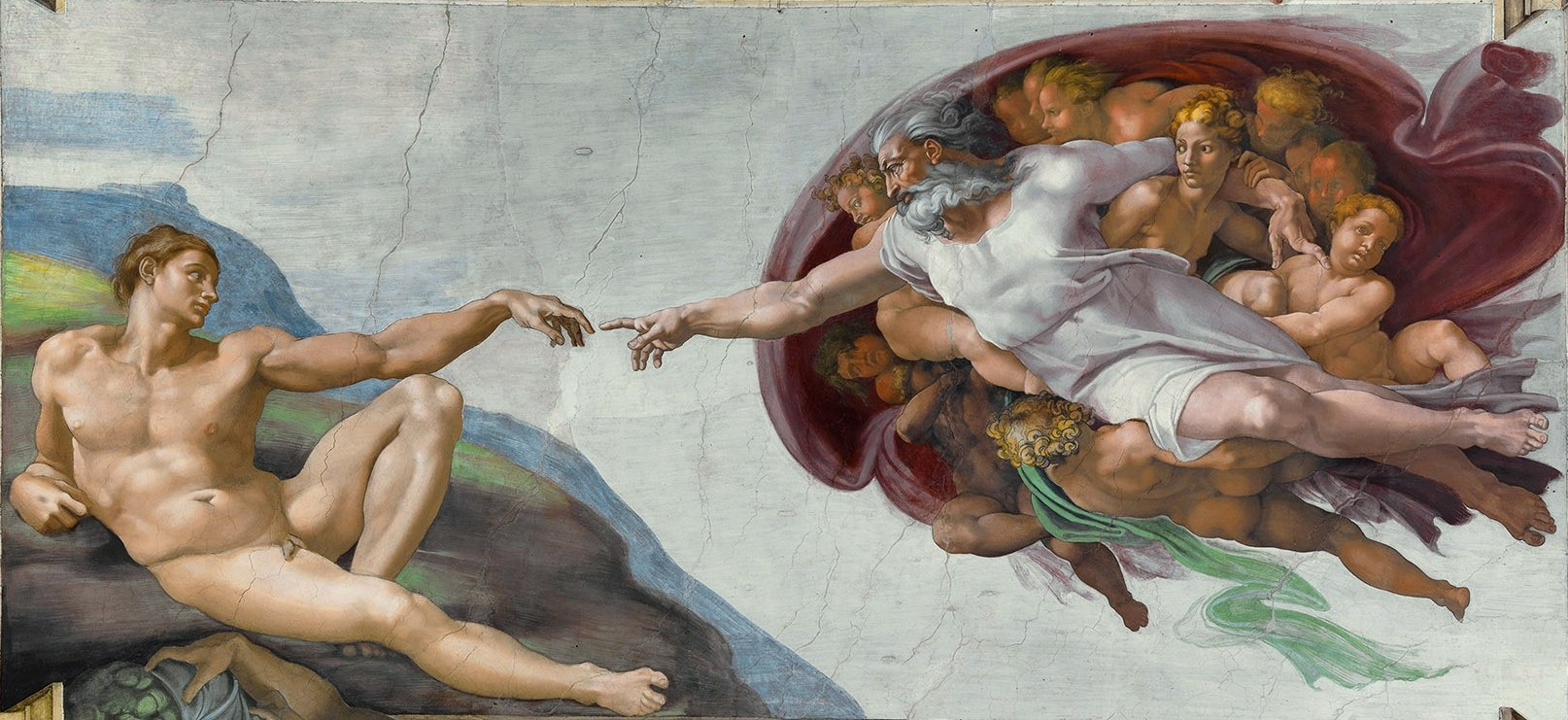
Michelangelo, Creation of Adam, 1511

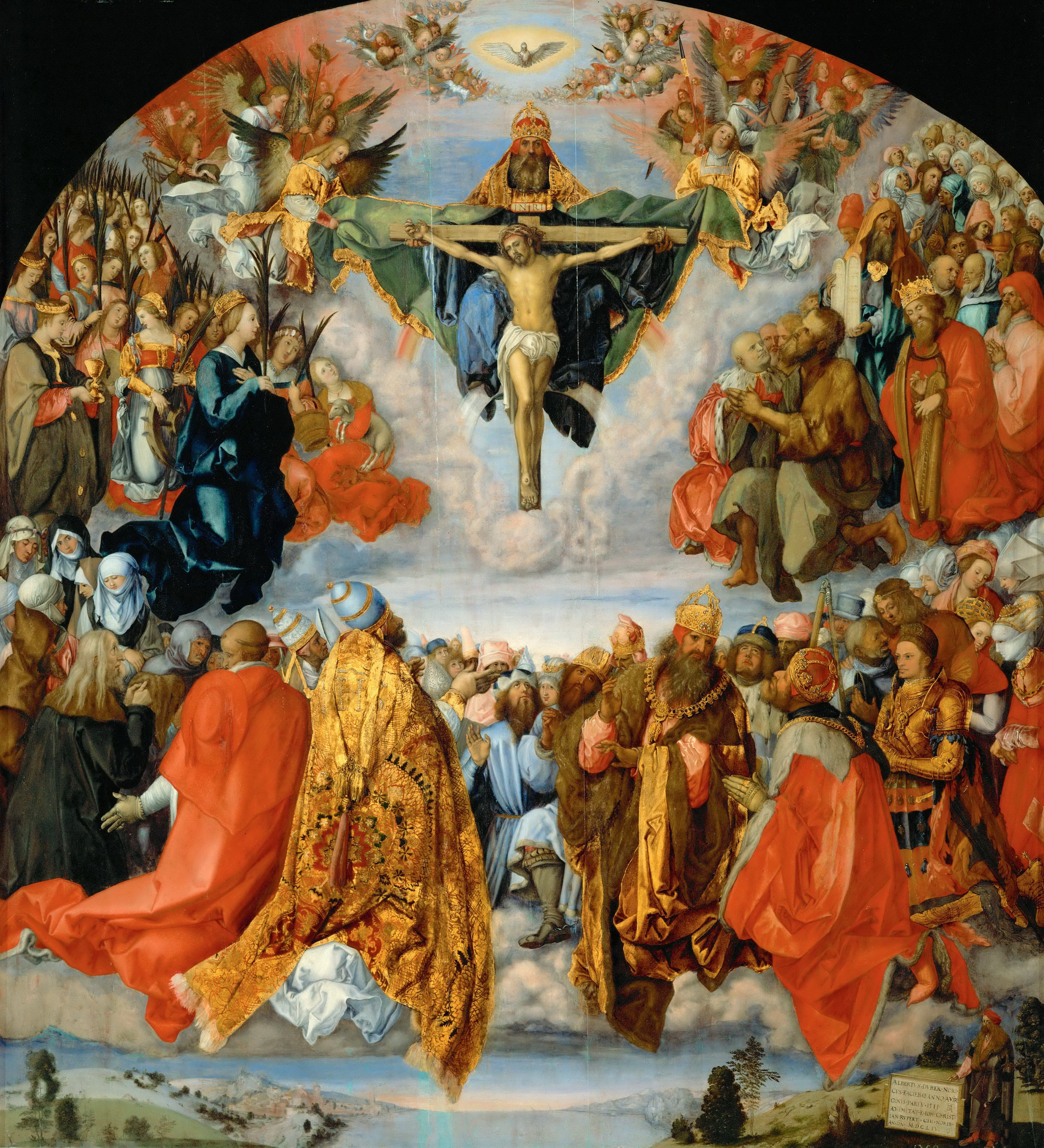
Albrecht Dürer, 1511

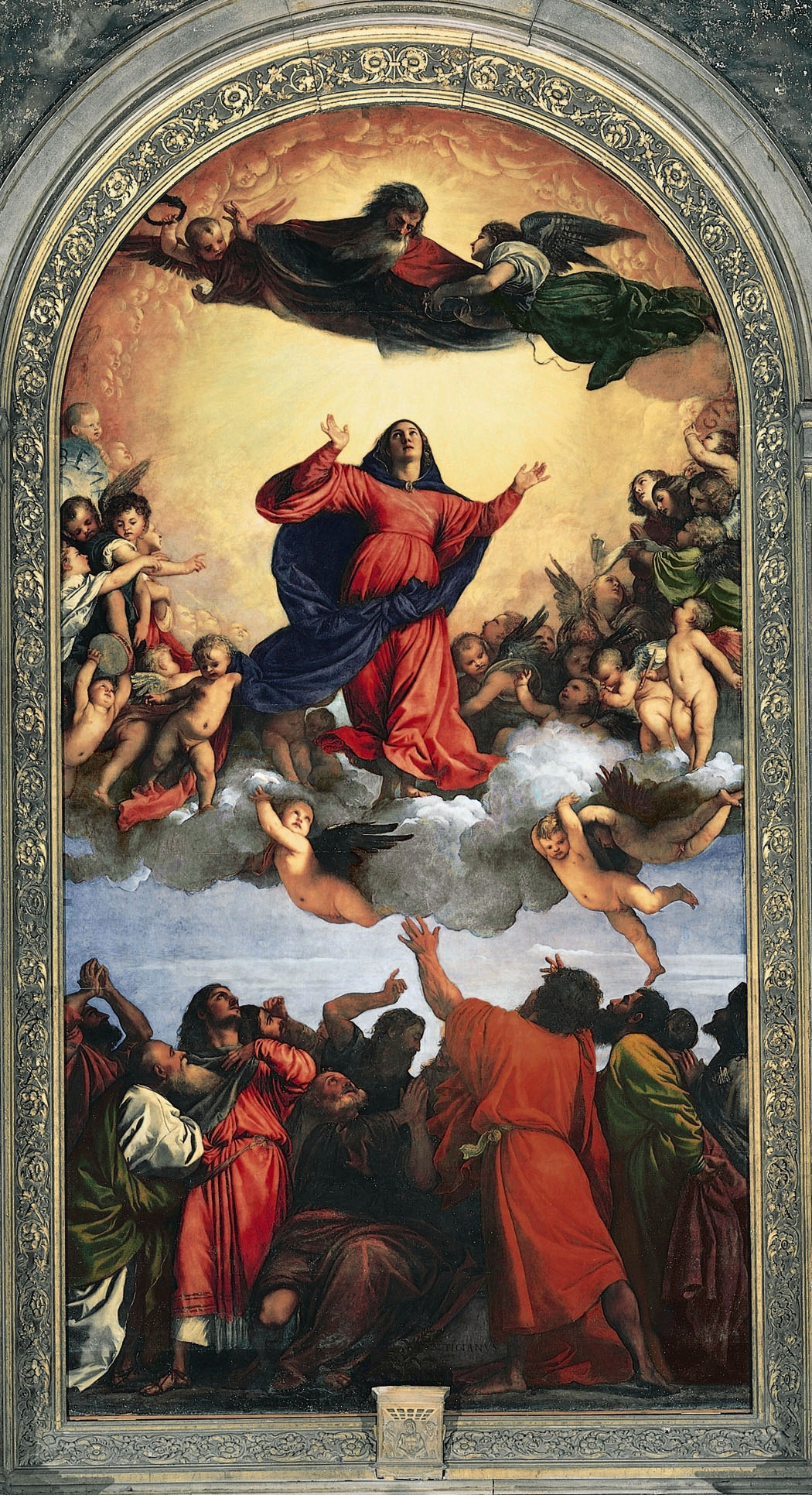
Titian's Assumption of Mary, 1516–1518

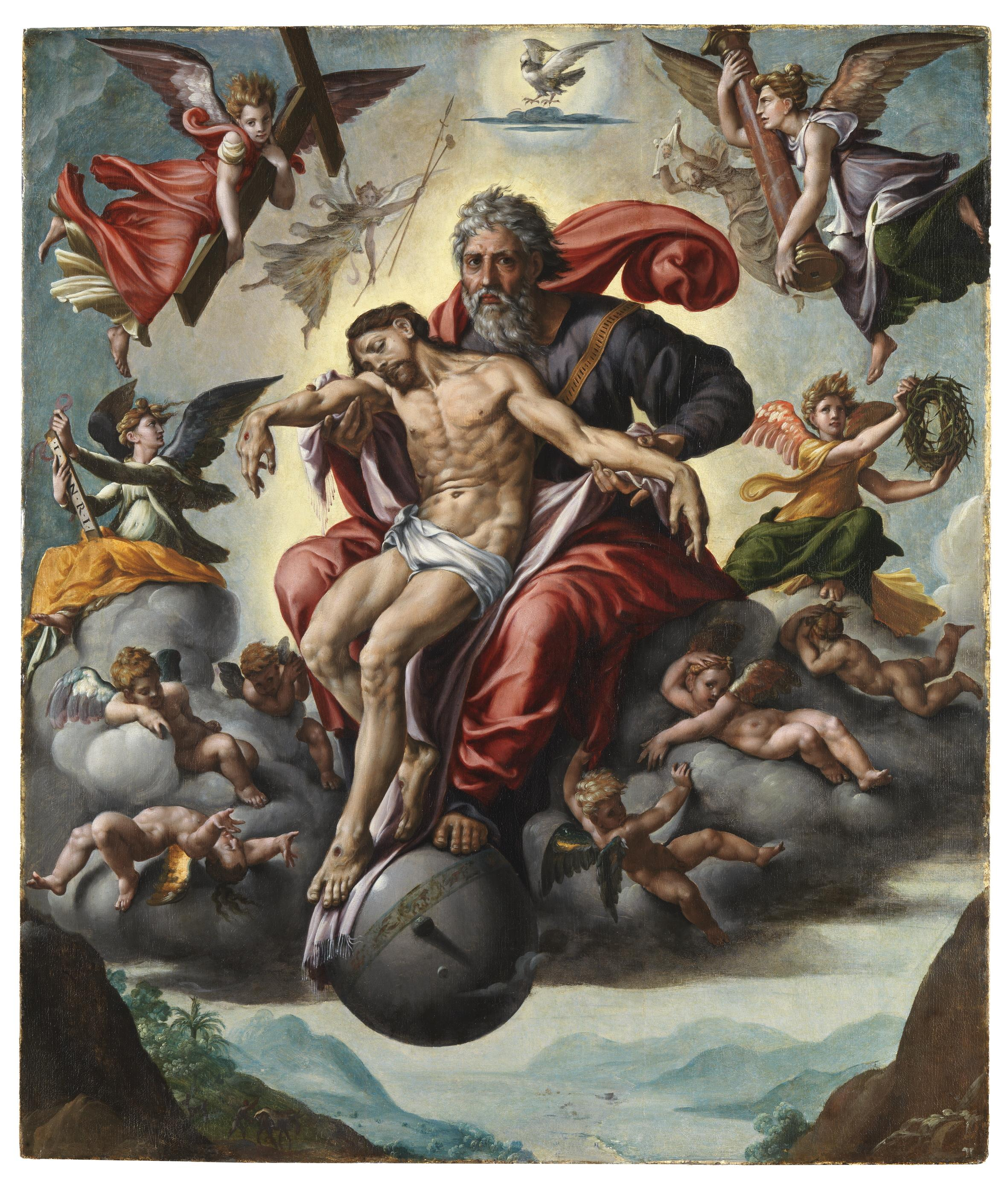
Jan Cornelisz Vermeyen, 16th century

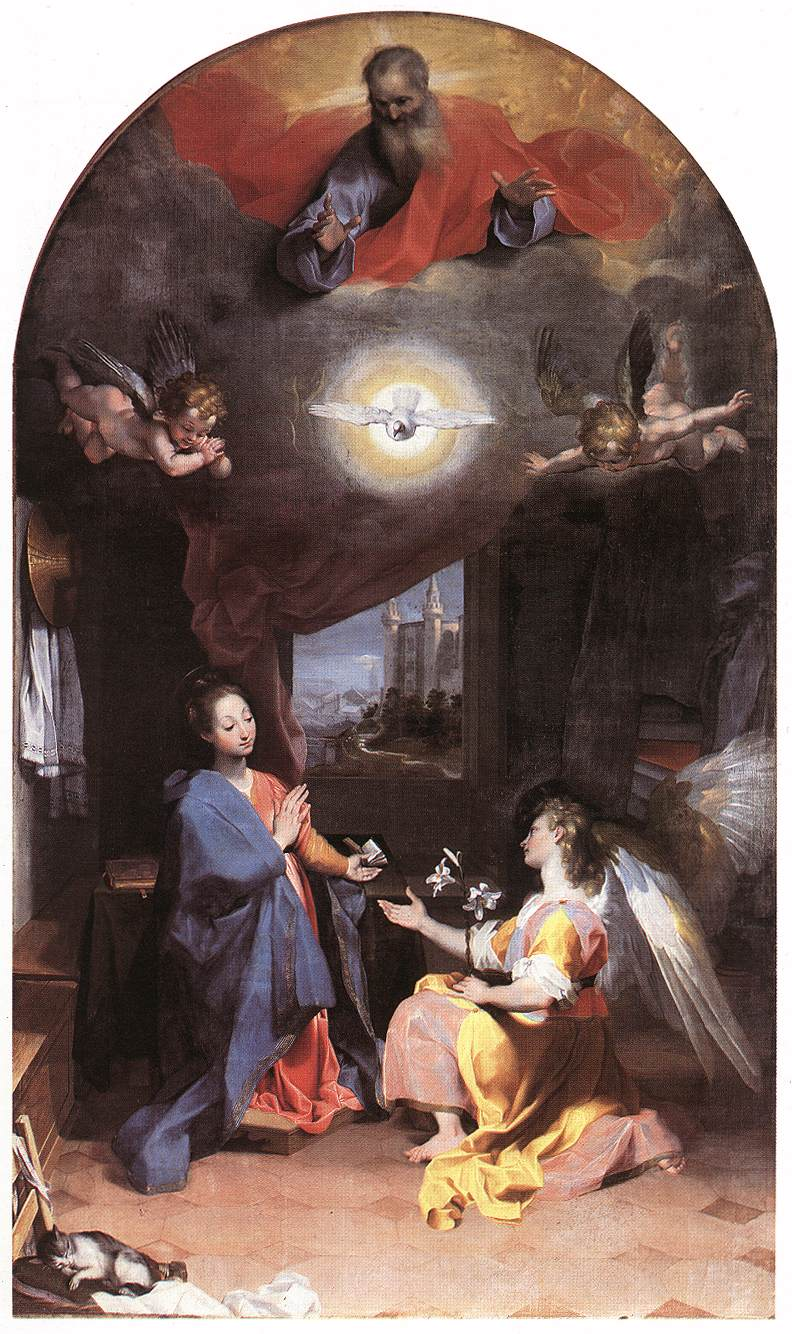
Federico Barocci, Annunciation, 1592

=== 17th century ===
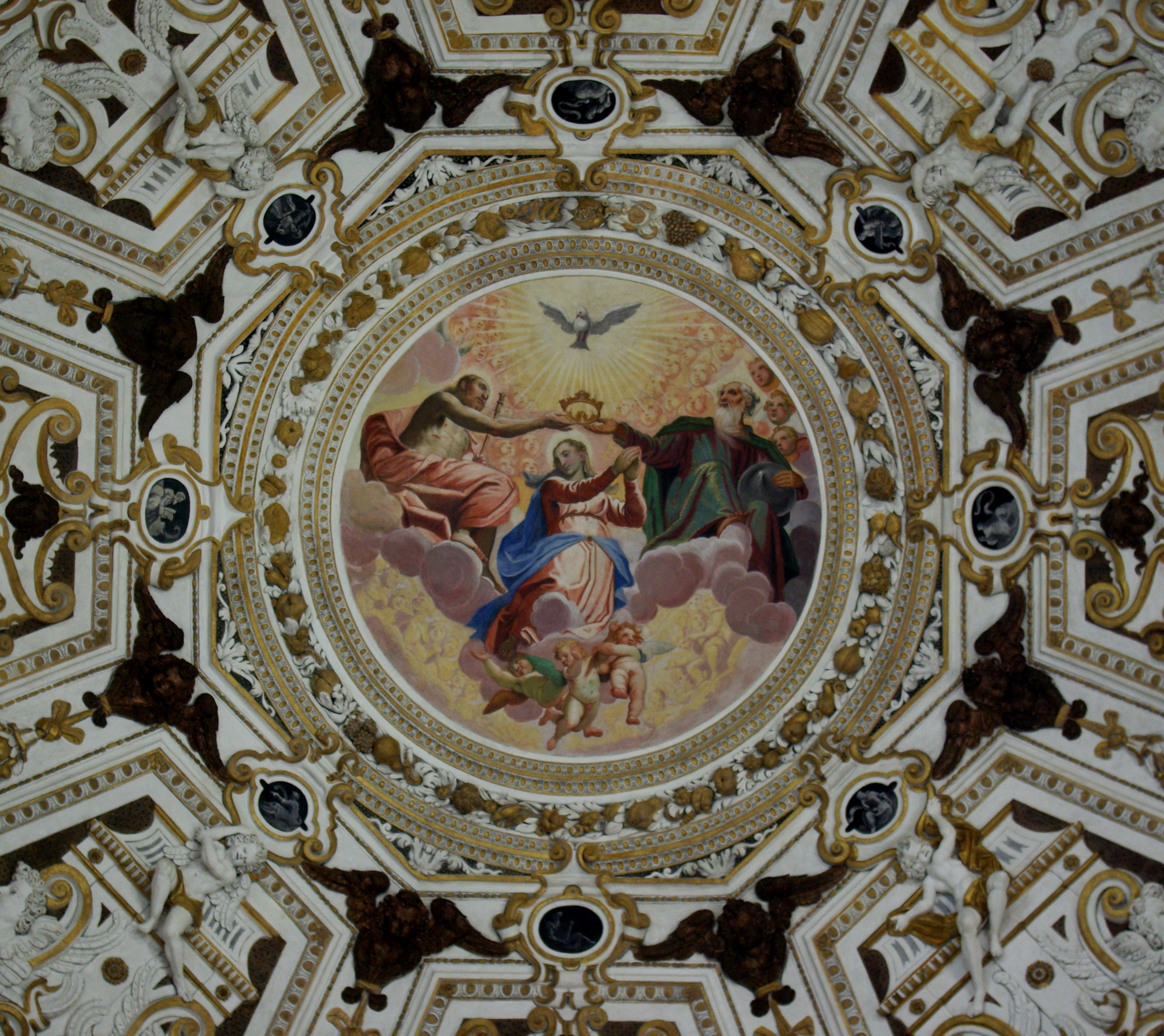
Riva del Garda, Italy 1603–1636

Rubens Last Judgment (detail) 1617

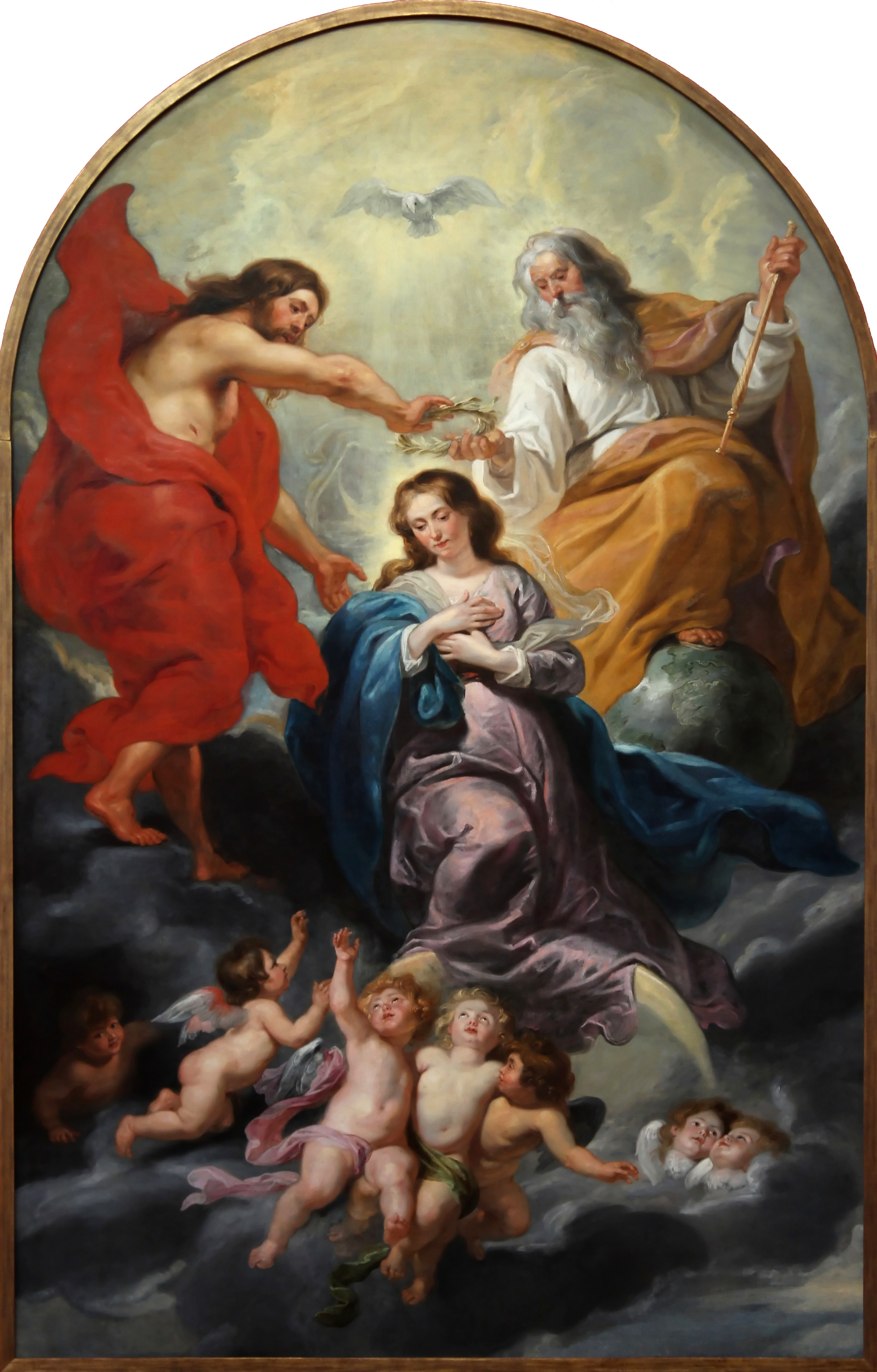
Crowning of the Virgin by Rubens, c. 1625

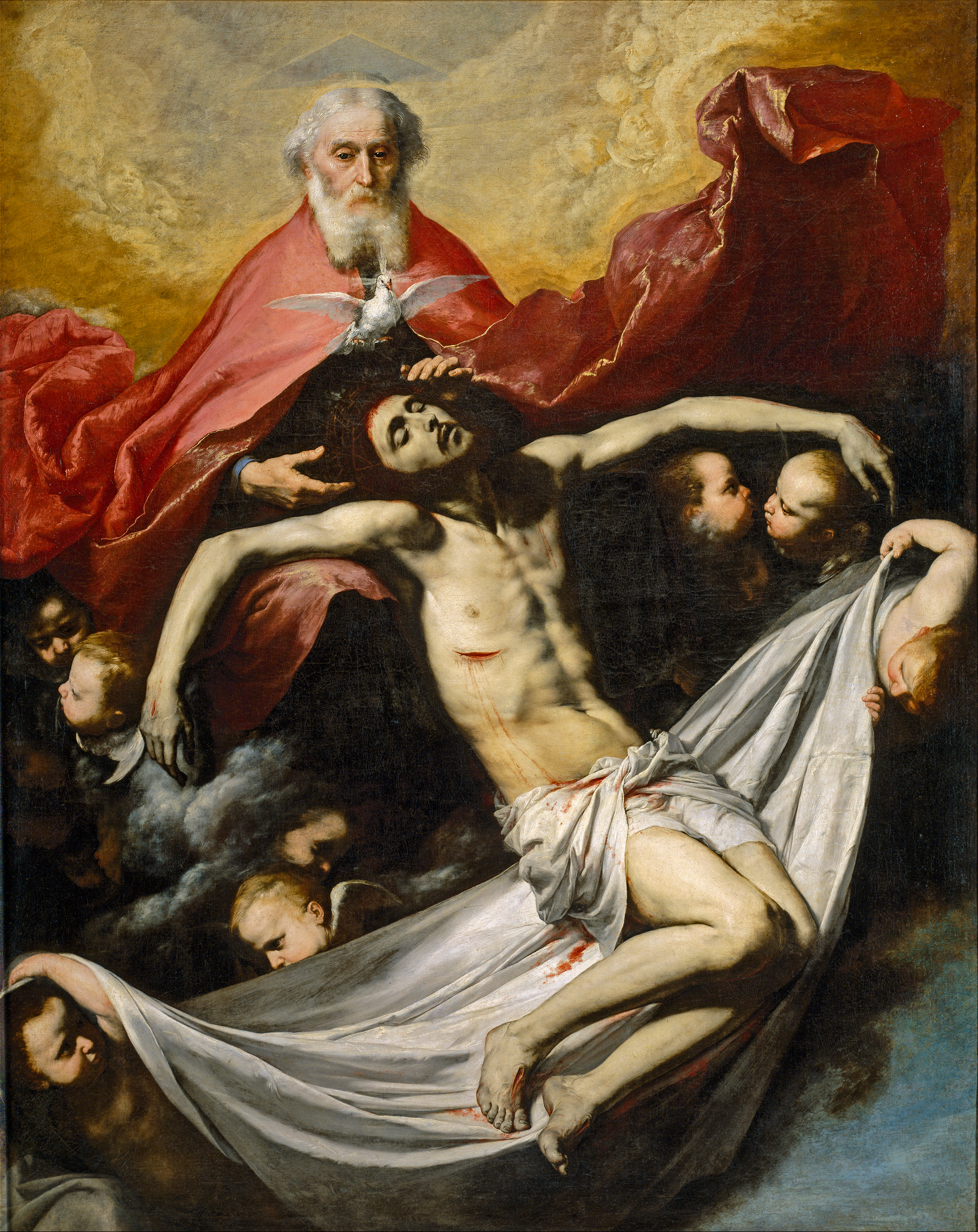
José de Ribera, 1635

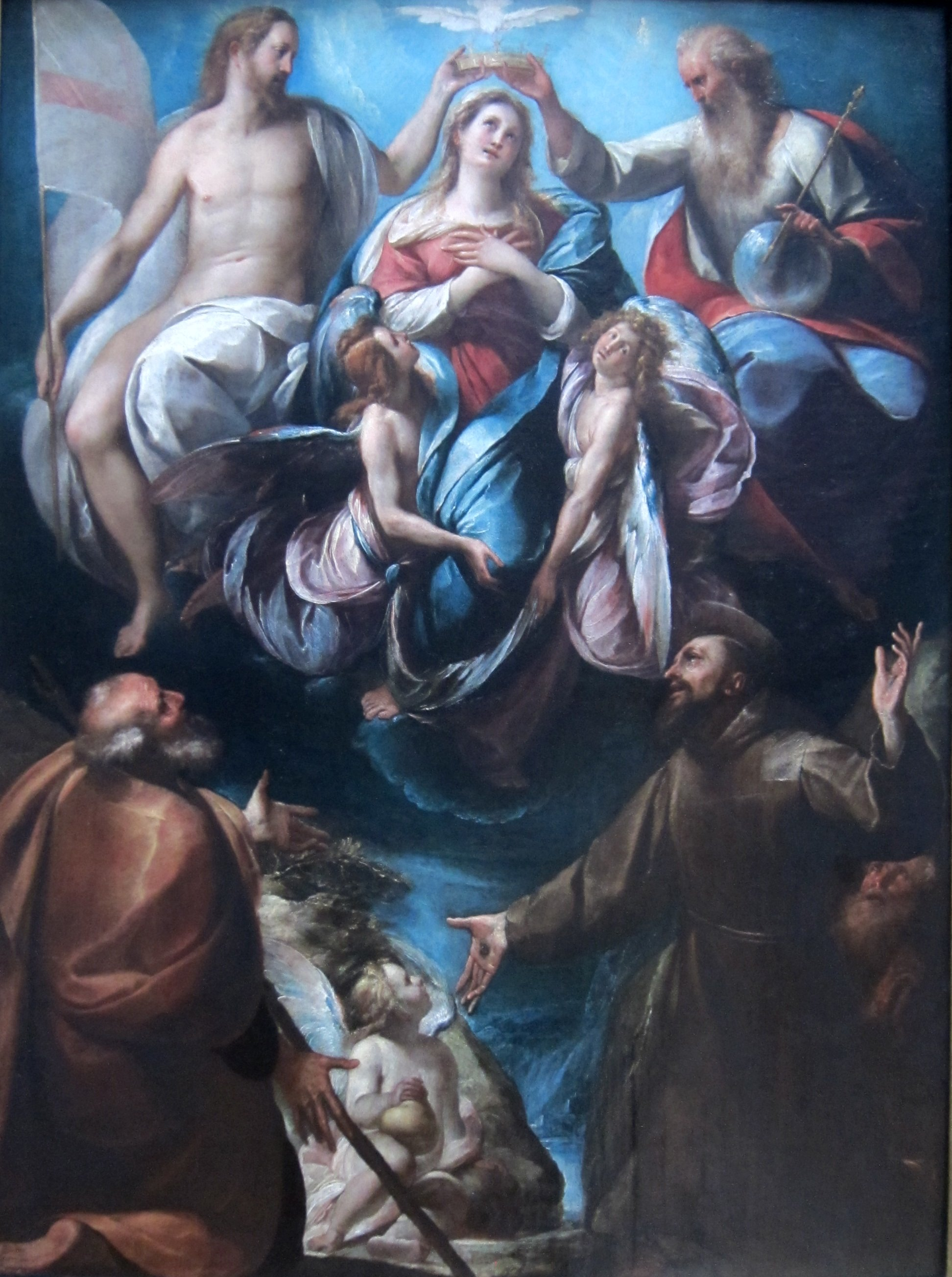
Giulio Cesare Procaccini, Coronation of the Virgin, 17th century

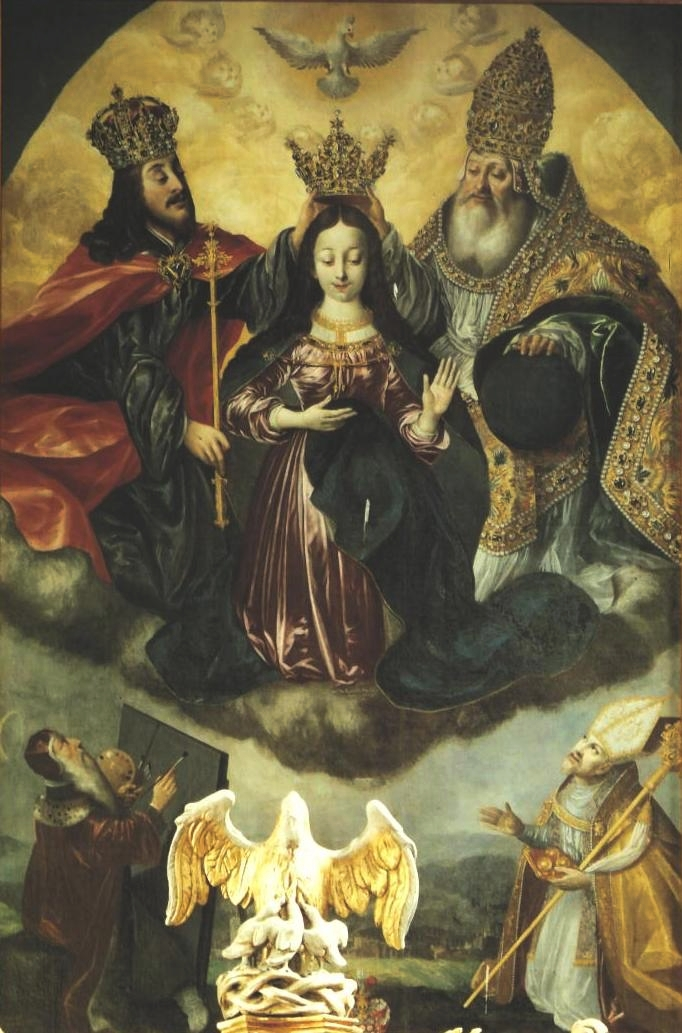
Bartholomeus Strobel, Poland, 1643

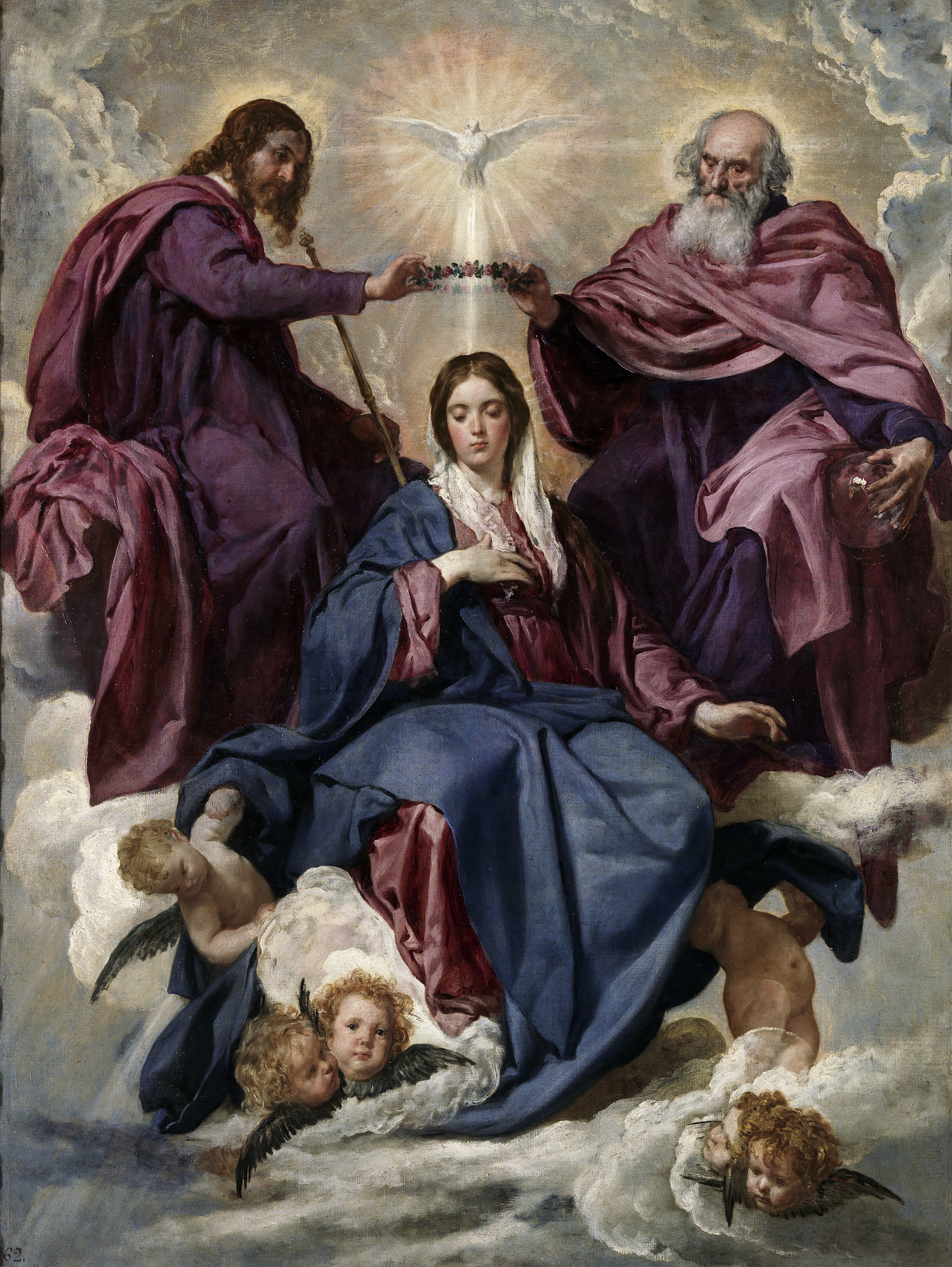
Velázquez, Crowning of the Virgin, 1645

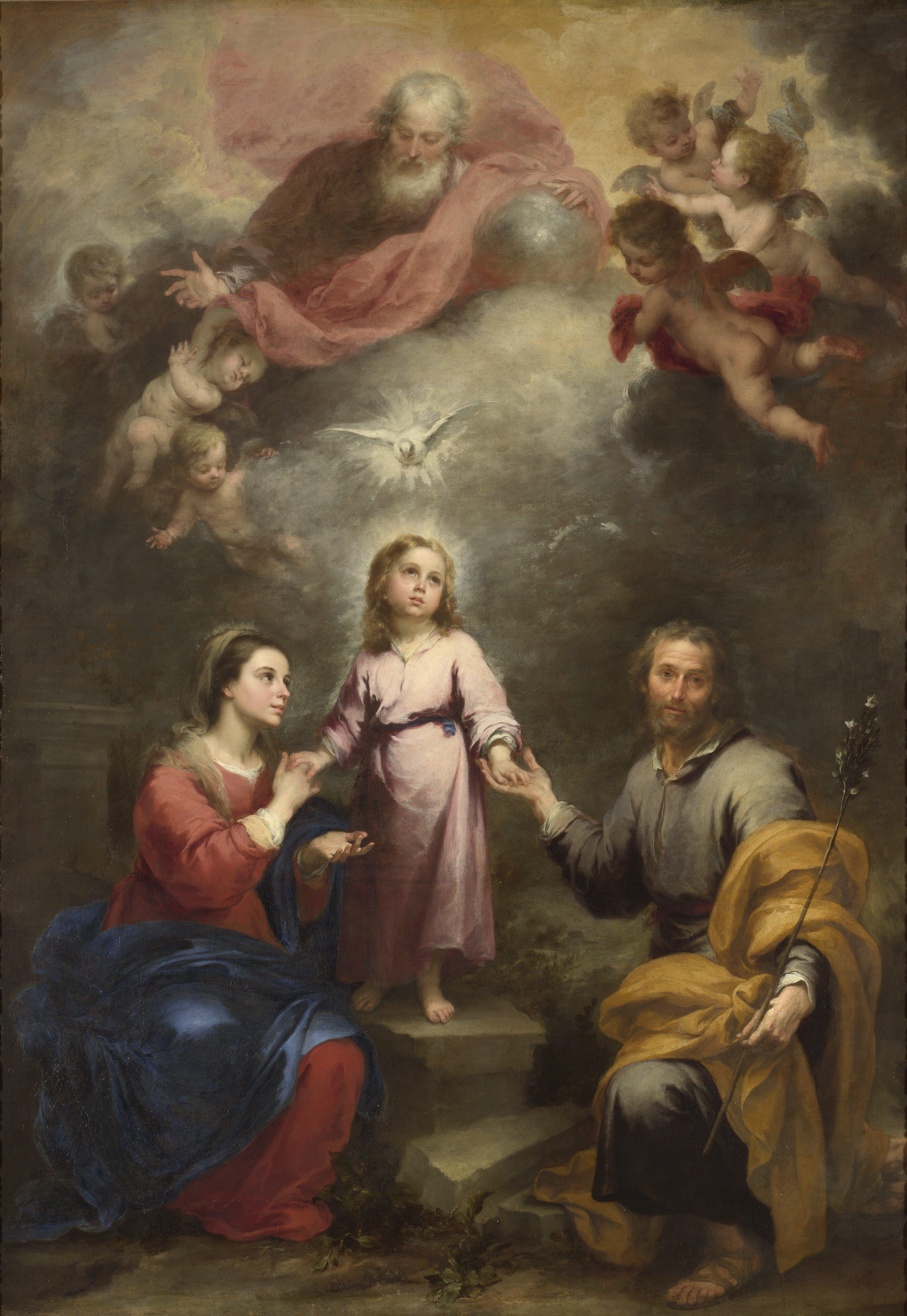
Murillo, 1675–1682

=== 18th–20th centuries ===
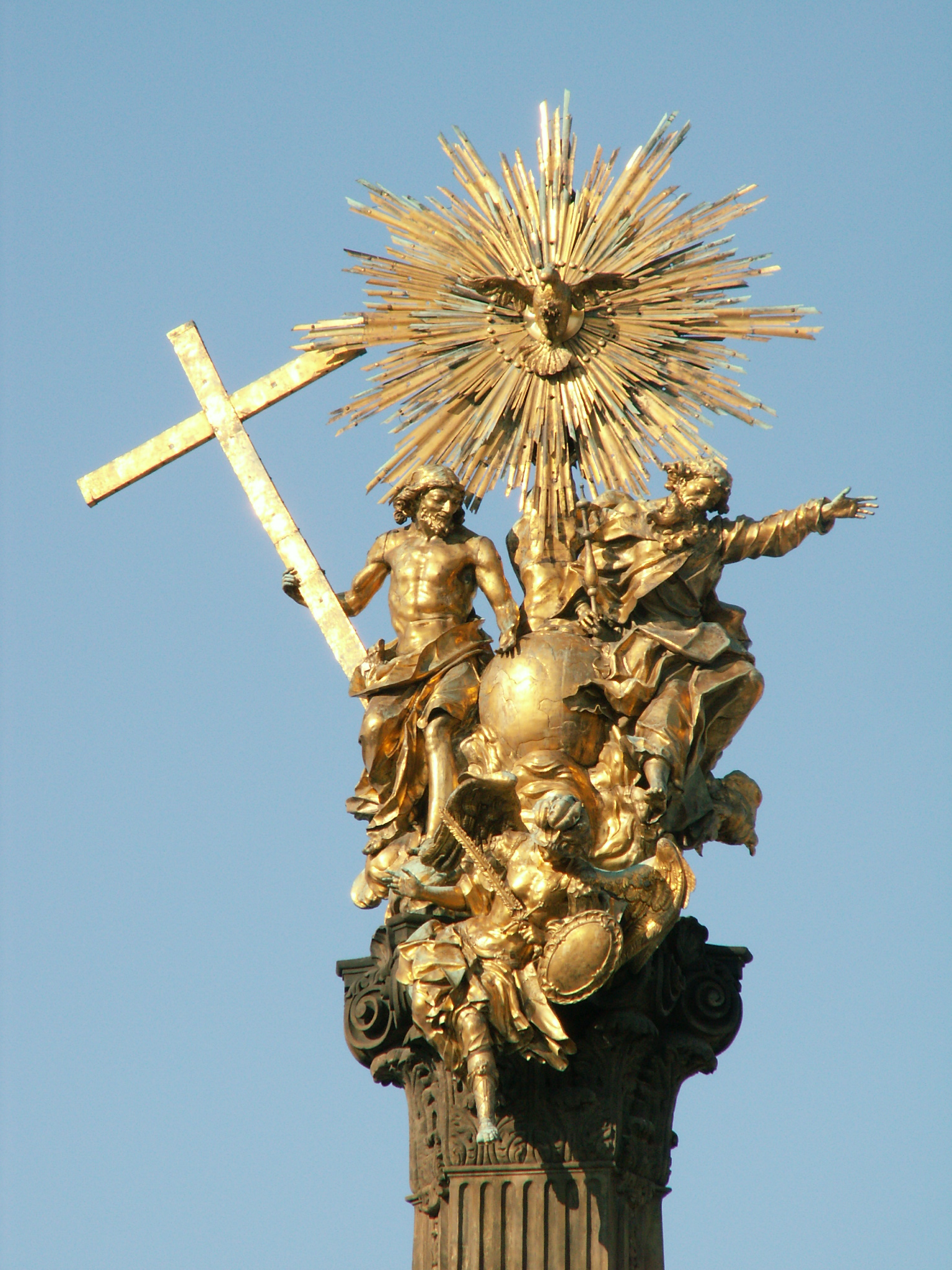
Holy Trinity Column in Olomouc, 1754

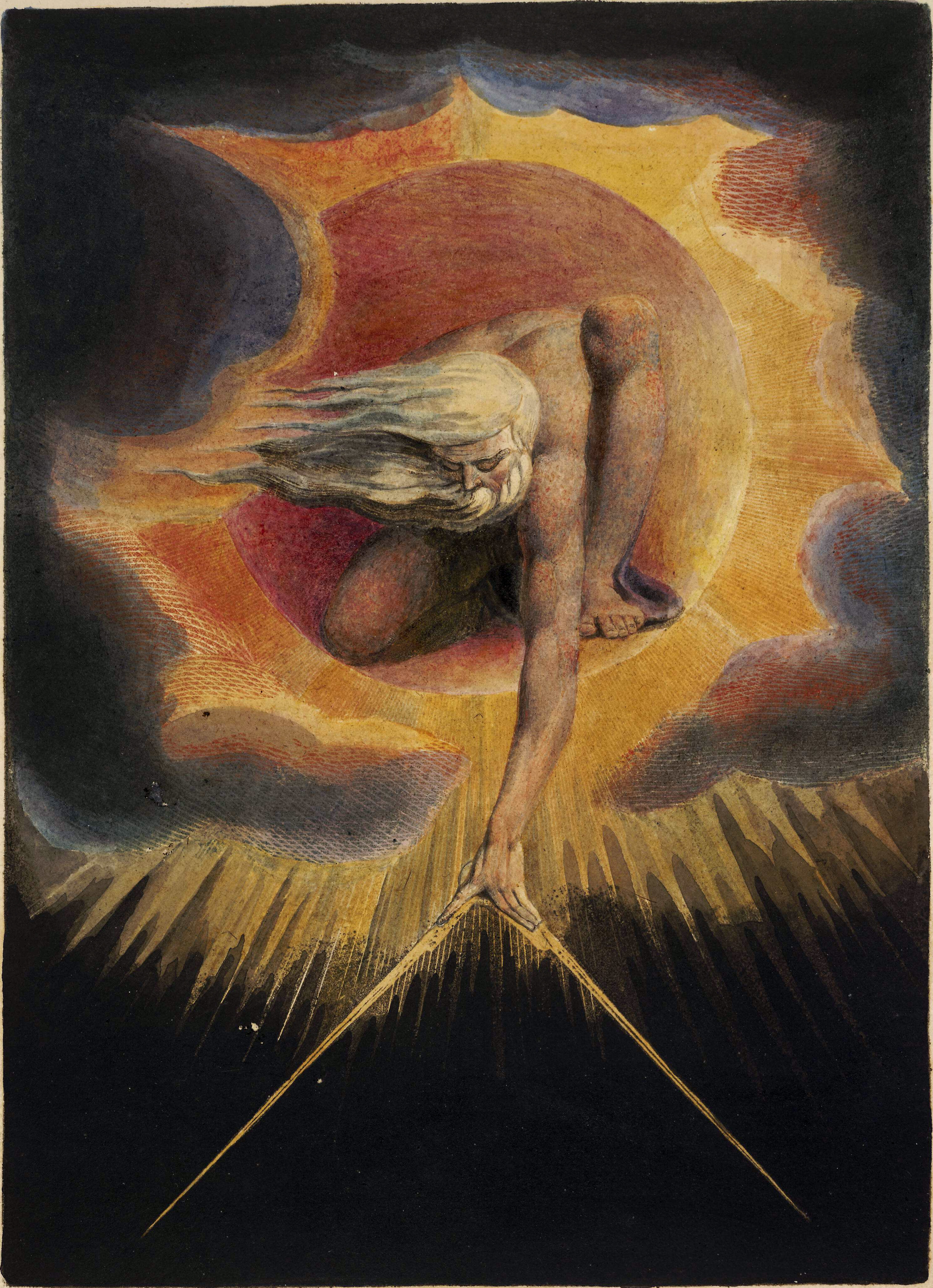
William Blake, Ancient of Days, 1794

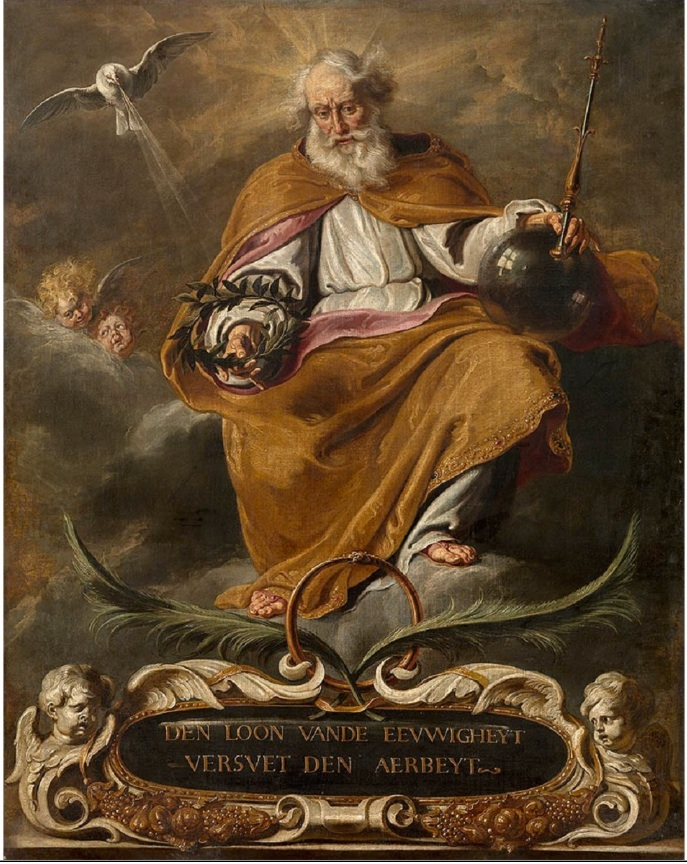
God the Father, Jacob Herreyns the Elder, 18th century

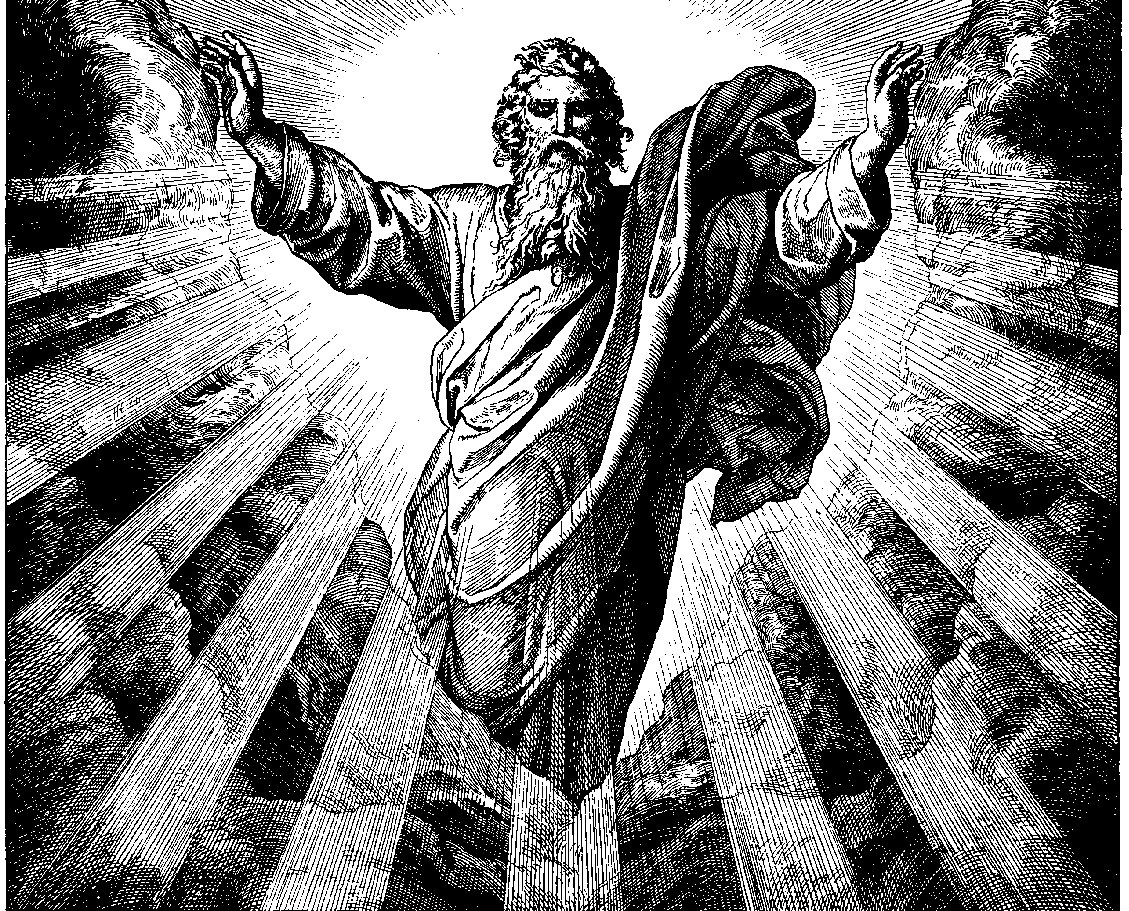
Julius Schnorr, 1860

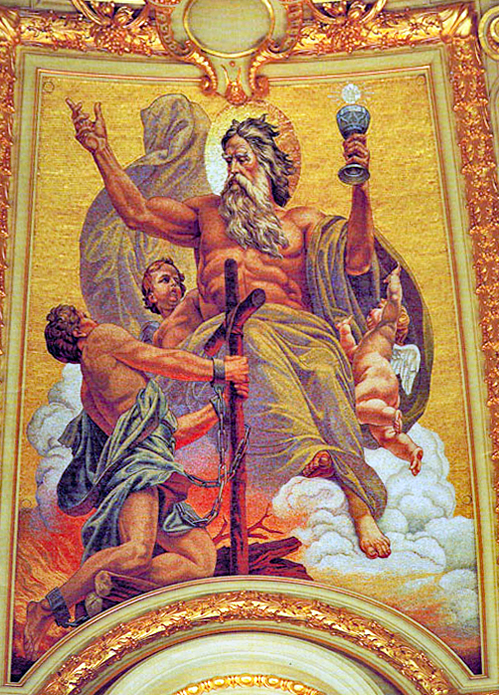
Anton von Werner, Berlin Cathedral, c. 1900

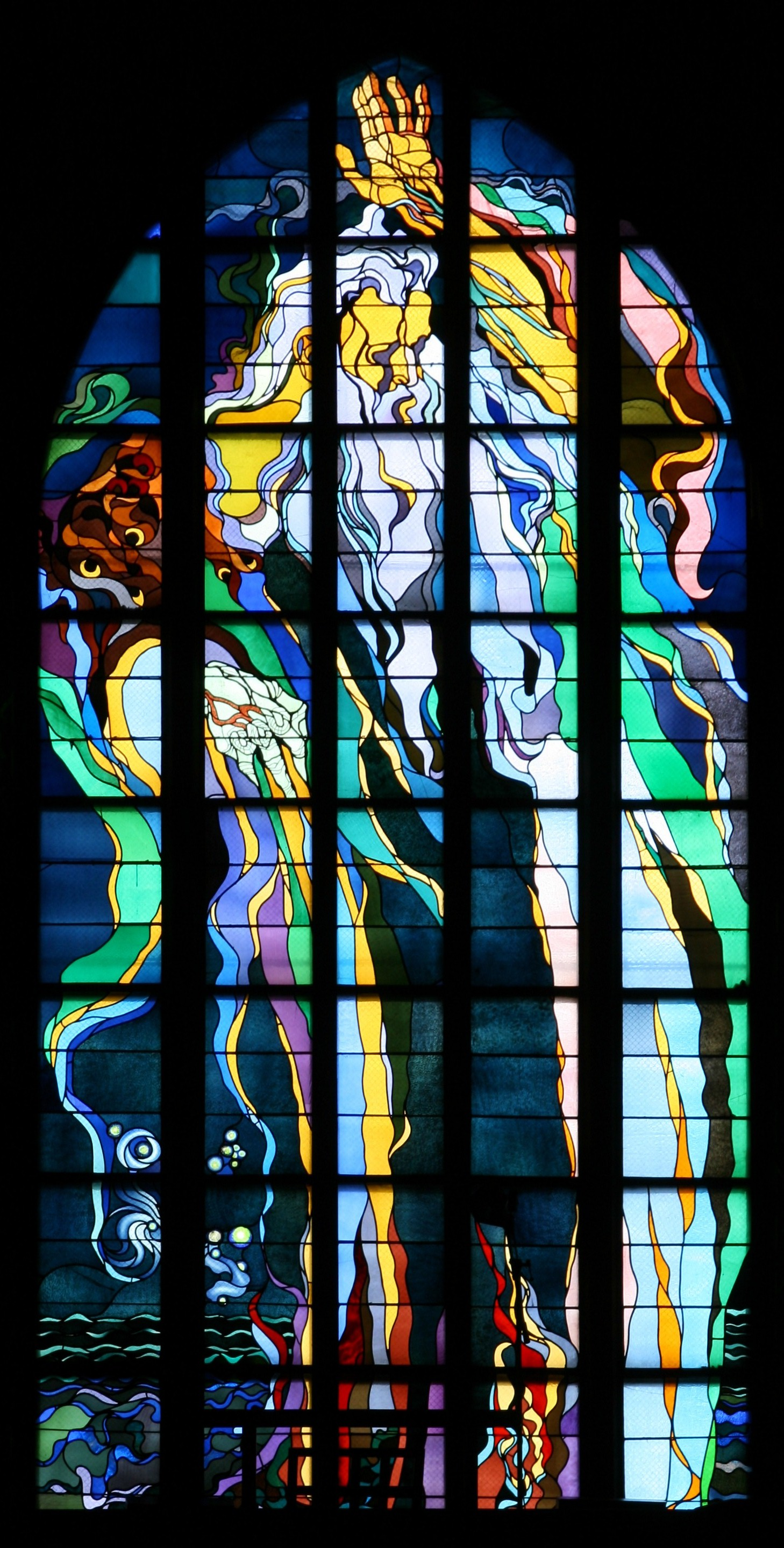
Stanisław Wyspiański, stained glass for St. Francis's Church in Kraków, ca. 1900

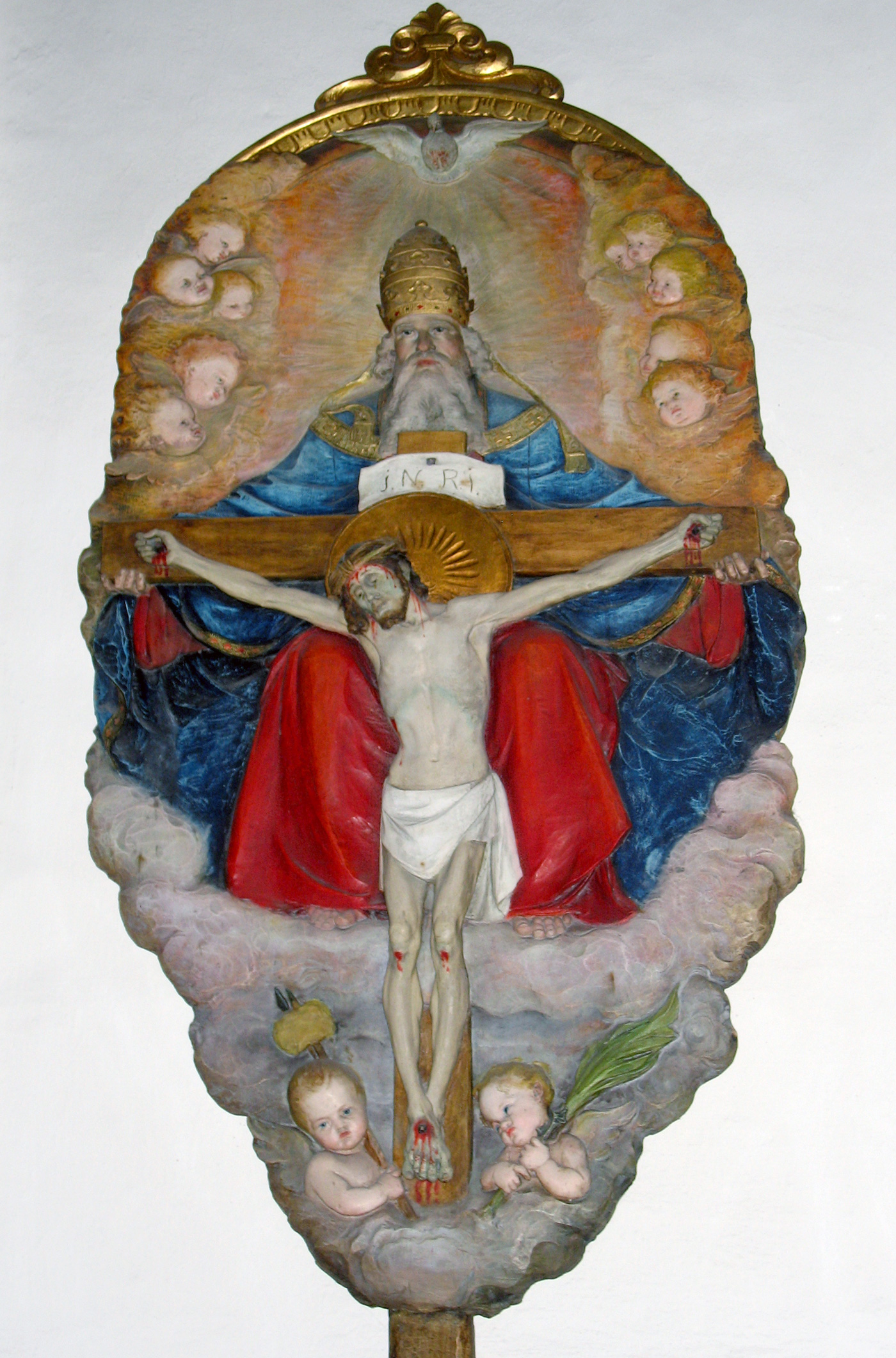
Val Gardena, Italy, 1910

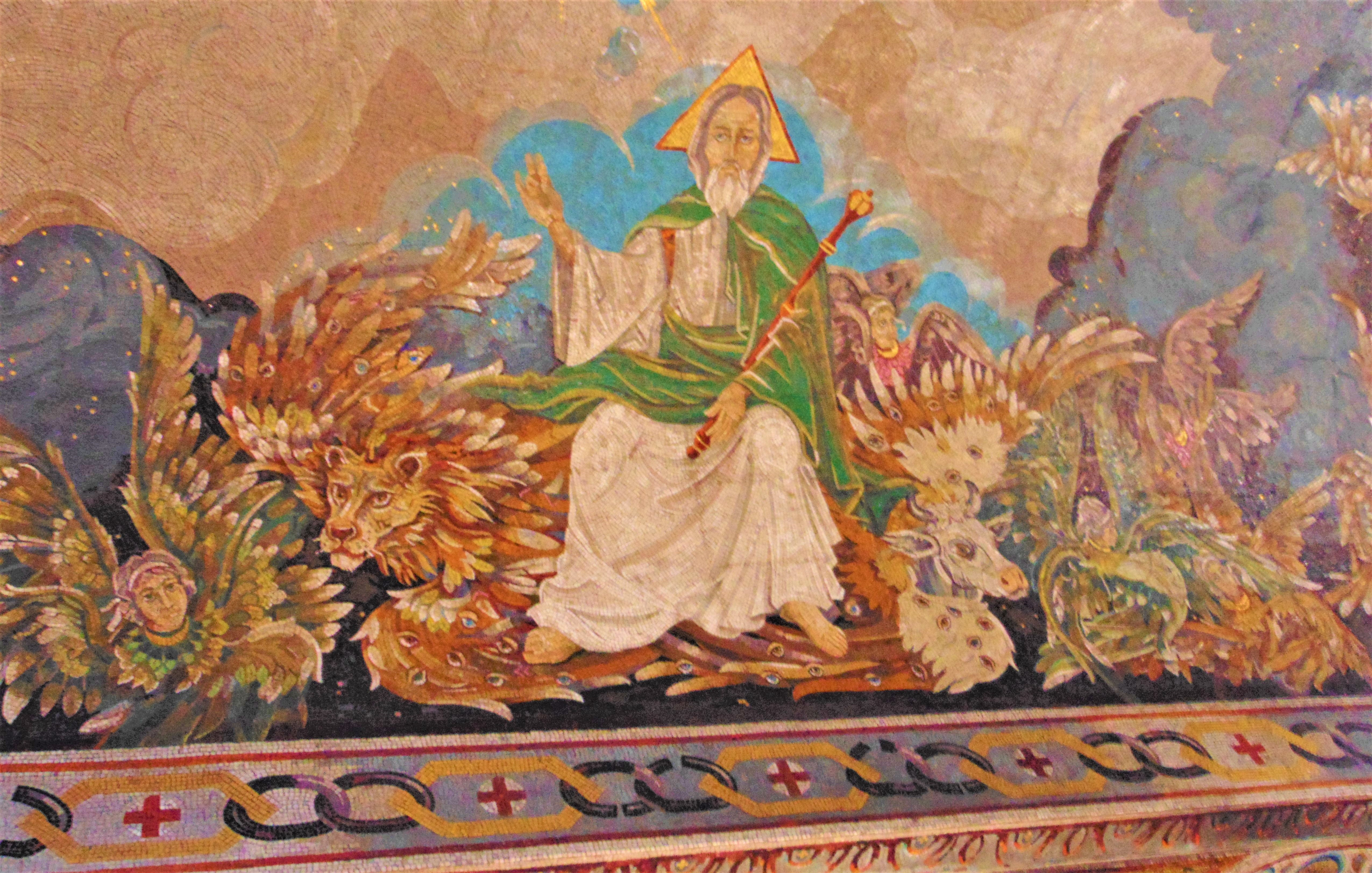
Mosaic in the Ružica Church, in Belgrade, Serbia 1930s

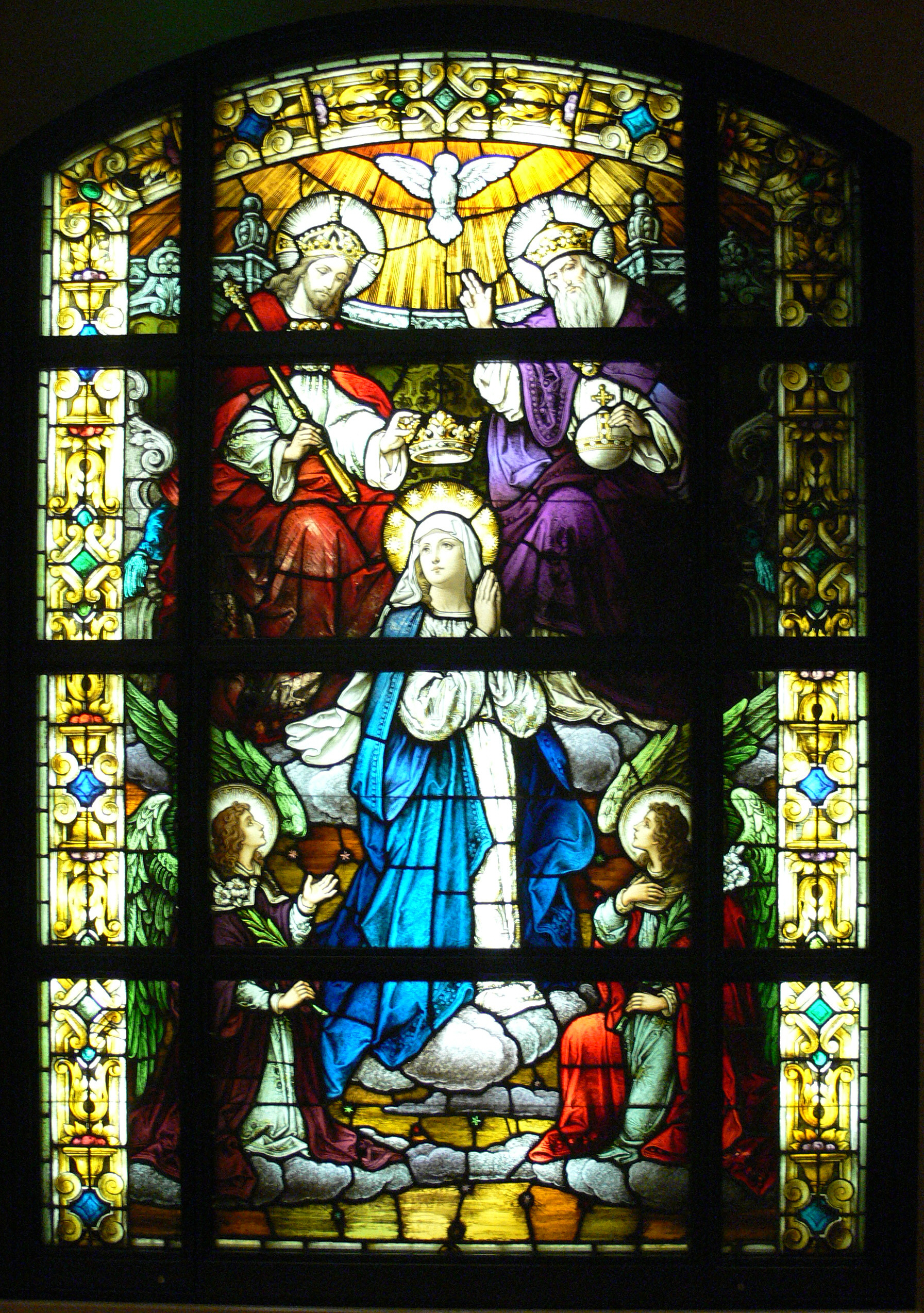
Los Angeles Cathedral, stained glass from the 1920s

== See also ==
- Holy Spirit in Christian art
- Trinity in Christian art
