= Godefroid de Claire =

- Born: c. 1100
- Died: c. 1173
- Other names: Godefroid de Huy, Godefroy de Huy

Godefroid de Claire or Godefroid de Huy (born c. 1100; died c. 1173) was a goldsmith and enamelist.

== Life and works ==
His main working period was 1130–1199. During this time, he worked in the area of Stavelot and the Meuse valley, in what is now Belgium.

He might have learned the art from Rainer of Huy.

His style was Mosan art, specialising in reliquary and iaphic art. His shrine of Pope Alexander I is preserved in the Royal Museums of Art and History.

It was suggested that he was the teacher of Nicholas of Verdun.

== Attributed Works ==
Name of Work	Year Made	Present Location	Picture	BALaT	Attribution
Triptych of the Holy Cross	?	Curtius Museum		1	Attribution by IRPA
Chief-reliquary of Pope Alexander	About1145	Musée du Cinquantenaire		2	Attribution by IRPA
Tree of Life enamel	About 1150	Treasure of the Collégiale de Huy		3	Attribution by IRPA
Altarpiece fragment from Stavelot: enamel "FIDES BABTISMUS"	About 1150	Museum Angewandte Kunst		4	Attribution by IRPA
Altarpiece fragment from Stavelot: enamel "OPERATIO "	About 1150	Kunstgewerbemuseum Berlin		5	Attribution by IRPA
Enamel book cover for the Gospel-book of Sibylle	1150 - 1160	Hessisches Landesmuseum Darmstadt		6	Attribution by IRPA
Triptych of Stavelot (excluding the central reliquaries)	About 1170?	Morgan Library and Museum			Attribution by comparison with the Chief-reliquary of Pope Alexander
Reliquary of Saint Domitien	1173	Treasure of the Collégiale de Huy		8	Attribution by IRPA
Reliquary of Saint Mengold	1173	Treasure of the Collégiale de Huy		9	Attribution by IRPA
