= Renier de Huy =

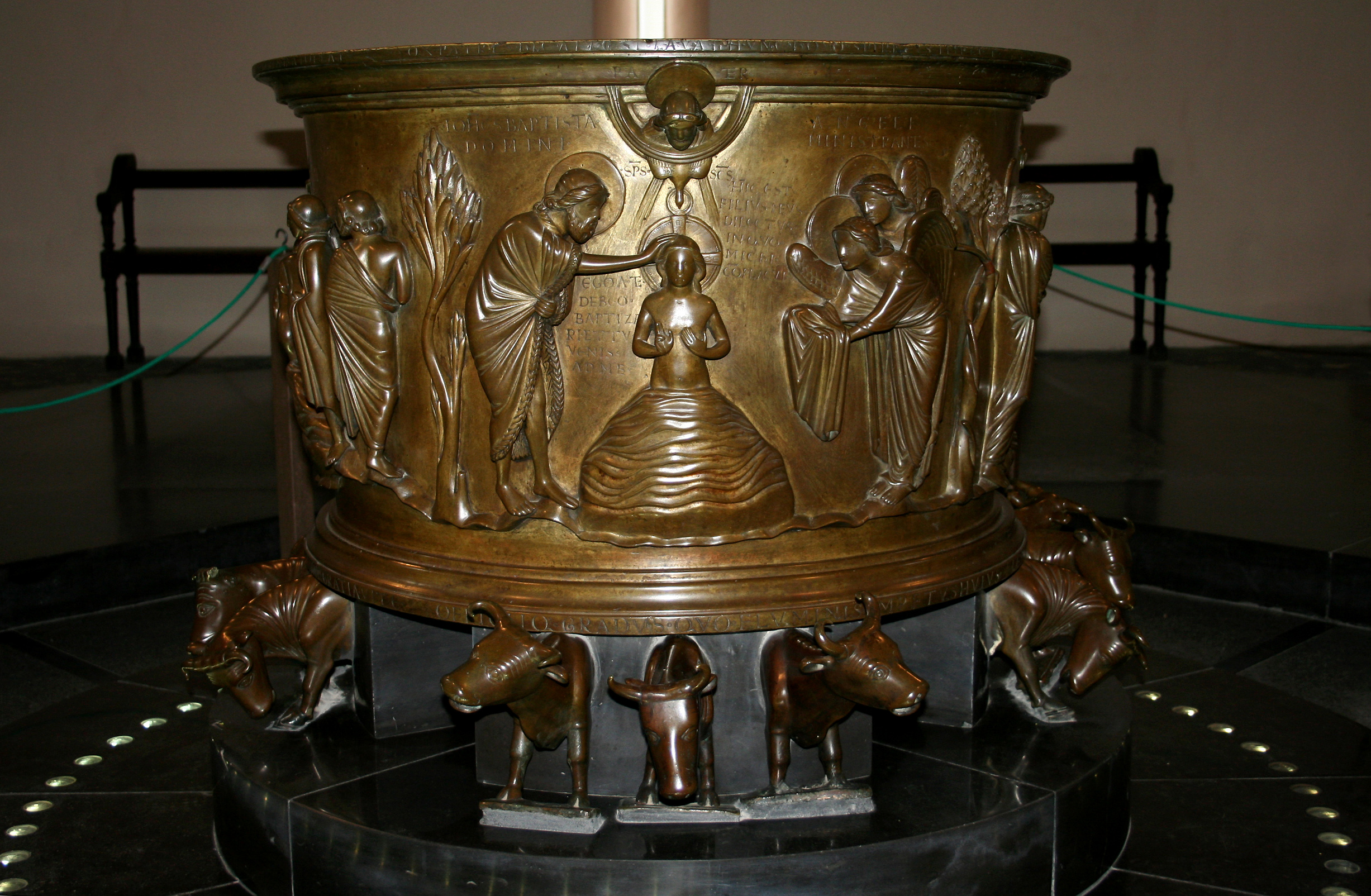
Baptism of Christ on the Liège font.

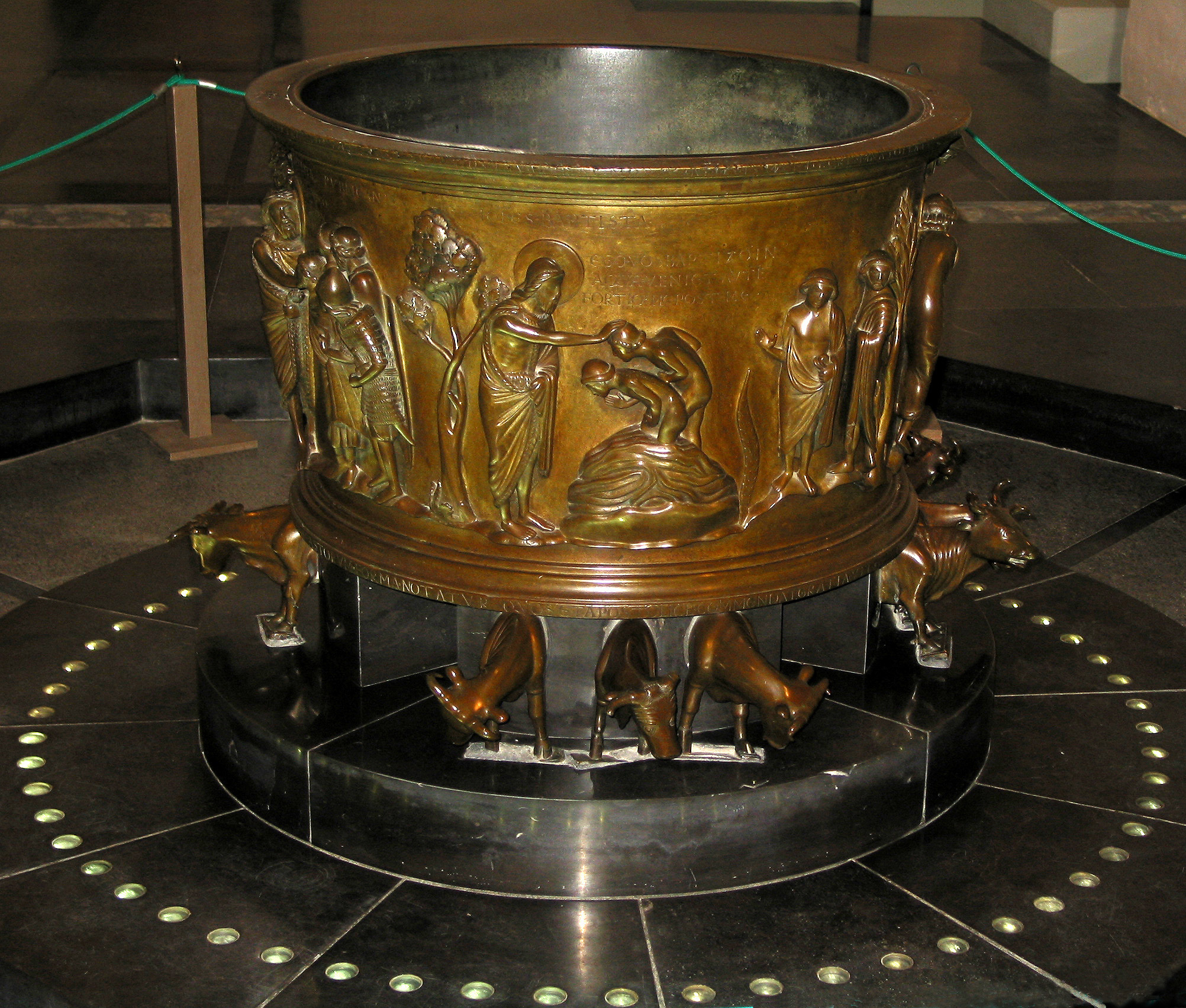
Another view of the font

Renier de Huy (or Rainer of Huy) (also Reiner, van, etc. in any combination) was a 12th-century metalworker and sculptor usually attributed with the major masterpiece of Mosan art, the baptismal font at St Bartholomew's Church, Liège in Liège, Belgium of 1107–18. Some recent scholarship questions this attribution. The Meuse river valley in modern Belgium and France, roughly comprising the Diocese of Liège, was the leading 12th century centre of Romanesque metalwork, which was still the most prestigious medium in art. Nothing is known of Rainer's life other than that a "Reinerus aurifaber" witnessed a charter of the Bishop of Liège relating to a church in Huy in 1125, but the 15th century Liège chronicle mentions him as the artist of the font. He may have died about 1150. Another equally shadowy figure in Mosan metalwork from the next generation, Godefroid de Huy/de Claire, also came from the small but prosperous city of Huy on the Meuse.

The only other work generally agreed to be by the same master as the font is a small bronze crucifix figure (Schnütgen Museum, Cologne); another in Brussels is probably from the same mould, with extra chasing. Others in Brussels and Dublin are probably from the workshop as they have many similarities.
