= Baptismal font at St Bartholomew's Church, Liège =

12th-century baptismal font now in Belgium

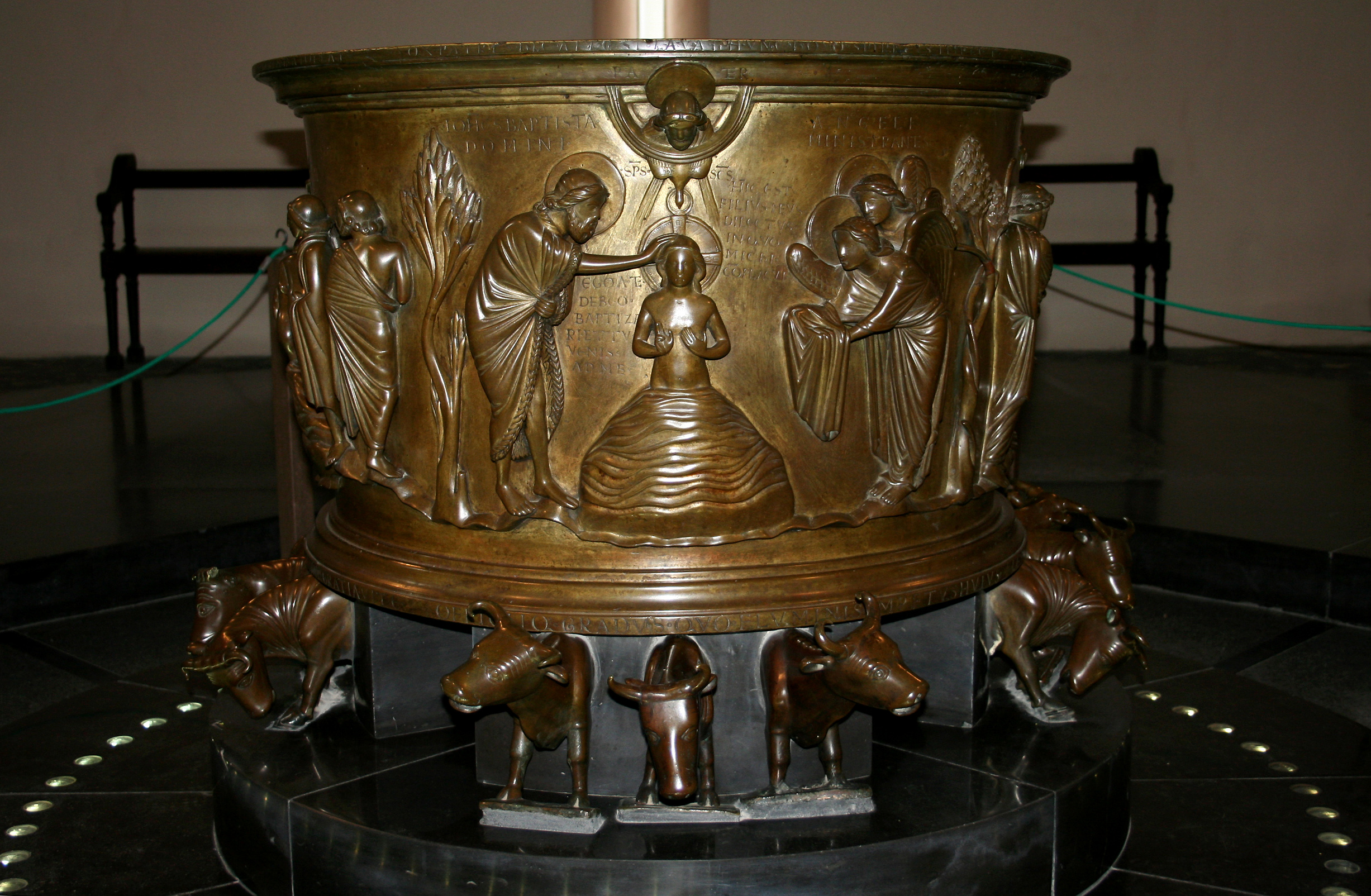
Baptism of Christ on the Liège font

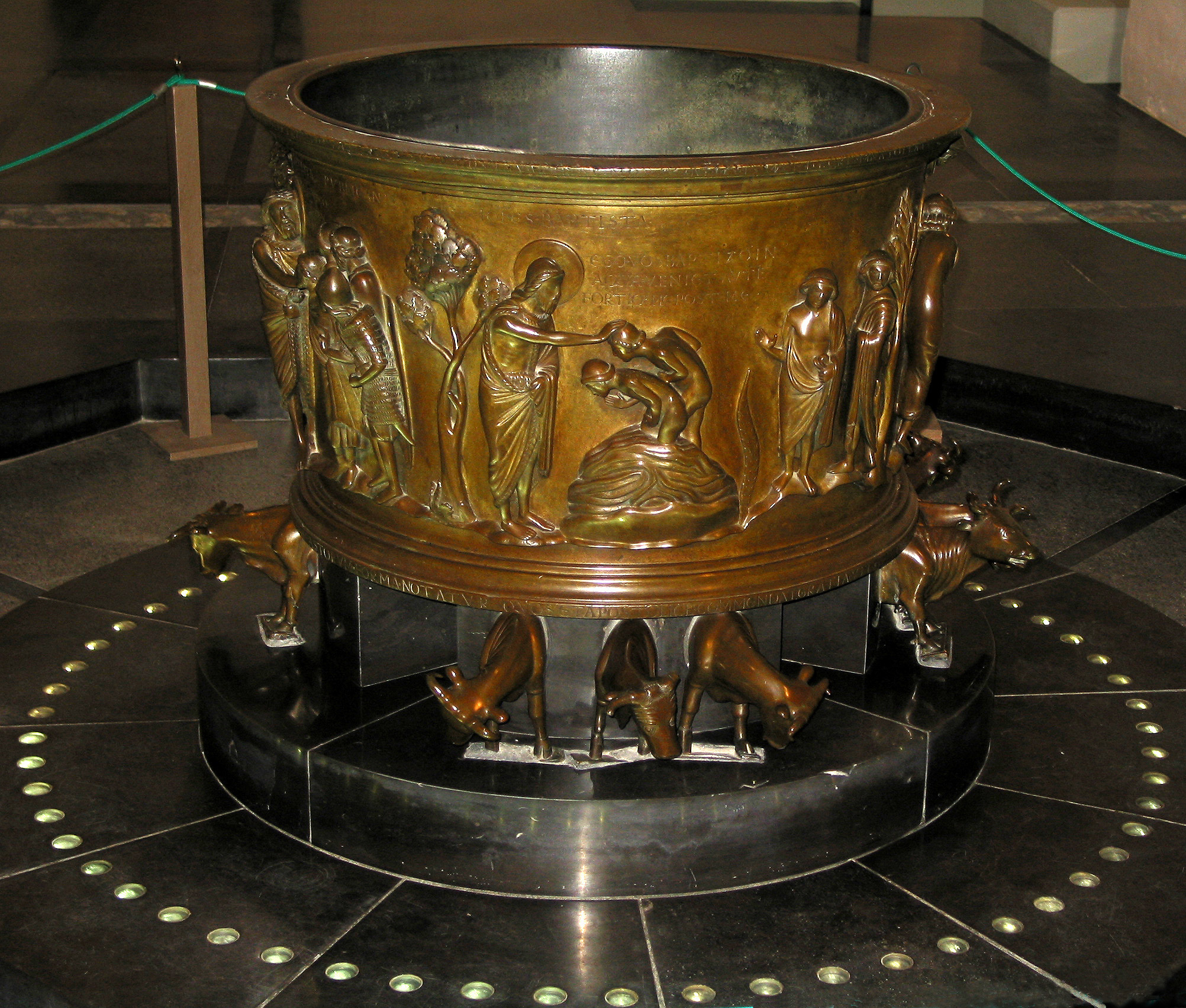
Another view of the font

The baptismal font at St Bartholomew's Church, Liège is a Romanesque brass or bronze baptismal font made between 1107 and 1118 now in the Collegiate Church of St. Bartholomew in Liège, Belgium. The font is a major masterpiece of Mosan art, remarkable for the classicism of its style, whose origin has been the subject of great debate among art historians. The Meuse river valley in modern Belgium and France, roughly coterminous with the Diocese of Liège, was the leading 12th-century centre of Romanesque metalwork, which was still the most prestigious medium in art.

== History ==
The Liège font was commissioned after 1107 and completed by 1118 for the Church of Our Lady with the Font (French: Église Notre-Dame-des-Fonts), which abutted the old Liège Cathedral and functioned as the baptistry for the city. These dates are based on the period of office of the Abbé Hellin, parish priest of the church, known to have commissioned it, for in his obituary in the contemporary Chronicon Rythmicum Leodiense (English: Liège Rhyming Chronicle) the font is clearly described, though with no mention of the artist. Both cathedral and church were destroyed during the French Revolution, and the font was hidden for safe-keeping before being moved to its present location in 1804. The Liège chronicle describes a cover with figures of the Four Evangelists and prophets, presumably also in metal, which was lost during the Revolution, along with two of the supporting oxen. The present stone plinth and setting replaced in the 20th century a solid round stone one built in 1804. The font is still used for baptisms today; there is normally a small charge for viewing it.

== Renier de Huy ==
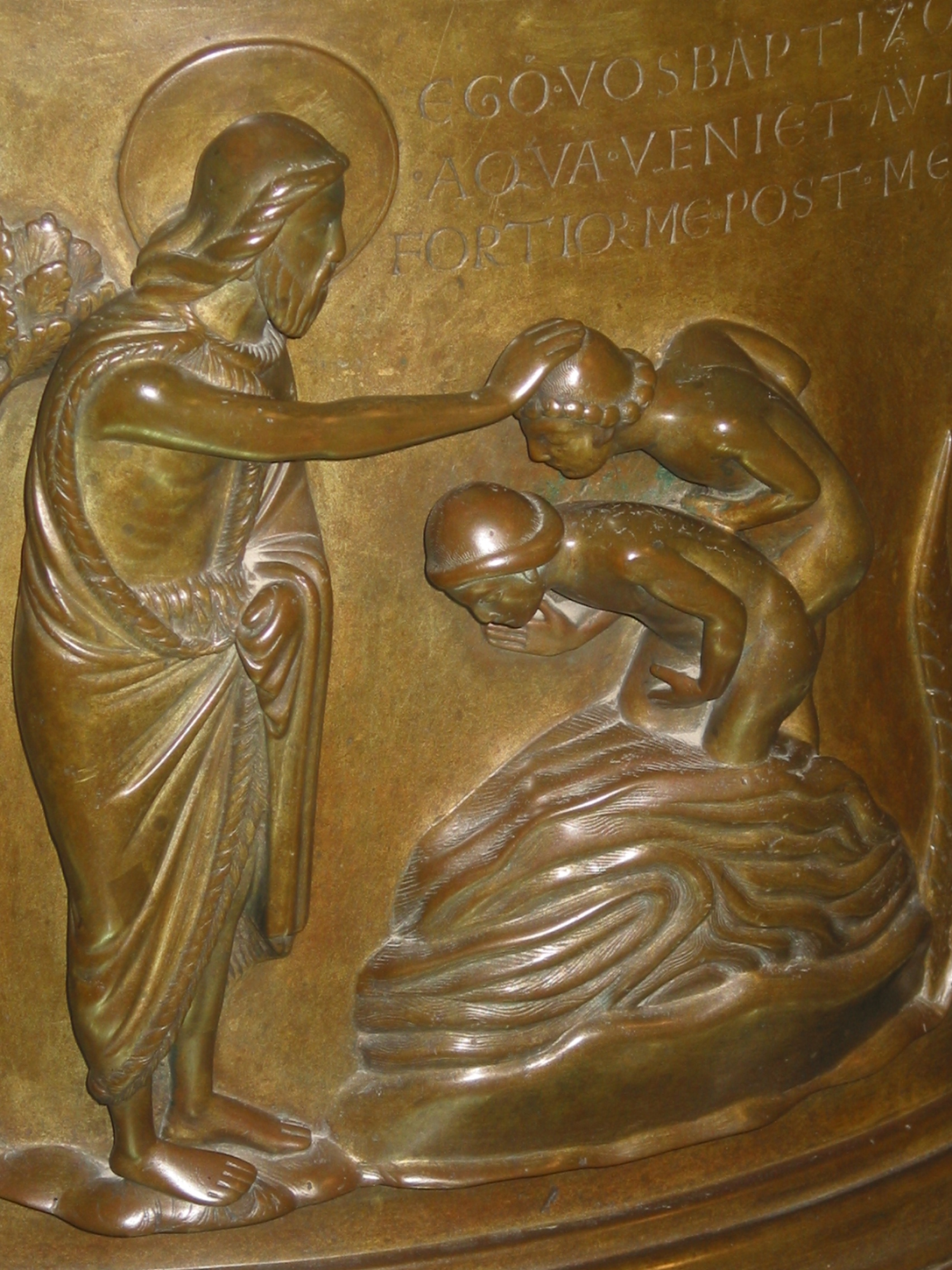
Detail of John the Baptist baptising the two neophytes

The font was traditionally attributed to Renier de Huy, a 12th-century metalworker and sculptor, but this, and even the Mosan origin of the font, have been questioned and alternative theories advanced. Nothing is known of Rainer's life other than that he was mentioned in a document of 1125 as a goldsmith, but a 14th-century chronicle mentions him as the artist of the font. He may have died about 1150. Another equally shadowy figure in Mosan metalwork from the next generation, Godefroid de Huy or de Claire, also came from the small but prosperous city of Huy on the Meuse.

The only other work generally agreed to be by the same master as the font is a small bronze crucifix (Schnütgen Museum, Cologne); another in Brussels has many similarities. A censer in similar style is attributed to Renier or a follower by many.

== Style and origin ==
The figures on the font are in very high relief, and have a remarkable classicism of style; so much so that it has also been suggested that it was in fact made in Constantinople, or by Greeks in Rome about 1000. Other explanations attribute the classicism to close Byzantine influence, though as Honour and Fleming point out, "In bodily proportions, poses, gestures and garments, they recall Classical models far beyond Byzantine, Carolingian, or even Early Christian art"; they suggest the artist might have seen ancient Greek sculptures in Constantinople when on the First Crusade. Other writers explain the style as emerging from older Mosan and Carolingian traditions, with recent Byzantine influence, and prefiguring Gothic figure style. The idealized figures are modelled in rounded forms; several nude figures are present, and one is seen from behind in a three-quarters view, a sophisticated classical pose.

Art-historical argument over the origin of the font has been vigorous and sometimes acrimonious, and in recent decades mostly conducted in French. In support of the Byzantine origin theory, analysis of the lead in 1993 has shown that it came from mines in Spain or Sardinia, whereas other Mosan works used locally sourced metal. Pierre Colman and his wife Berthe Lhoist-Colman have developed a "Roman" theory, according to which the Holy Roman Emperor Otto III commissioned the font from Greek craftsmen in Rome in about 1000, as a gift for the Basilica of Saint John Lateran there. Decades later it was carried off by Henry IV or Henry V to the Meuse. However most art historians continue to accept the traditional Mosan attribution, and relate the style to the other works mentioned above.

== Description ==
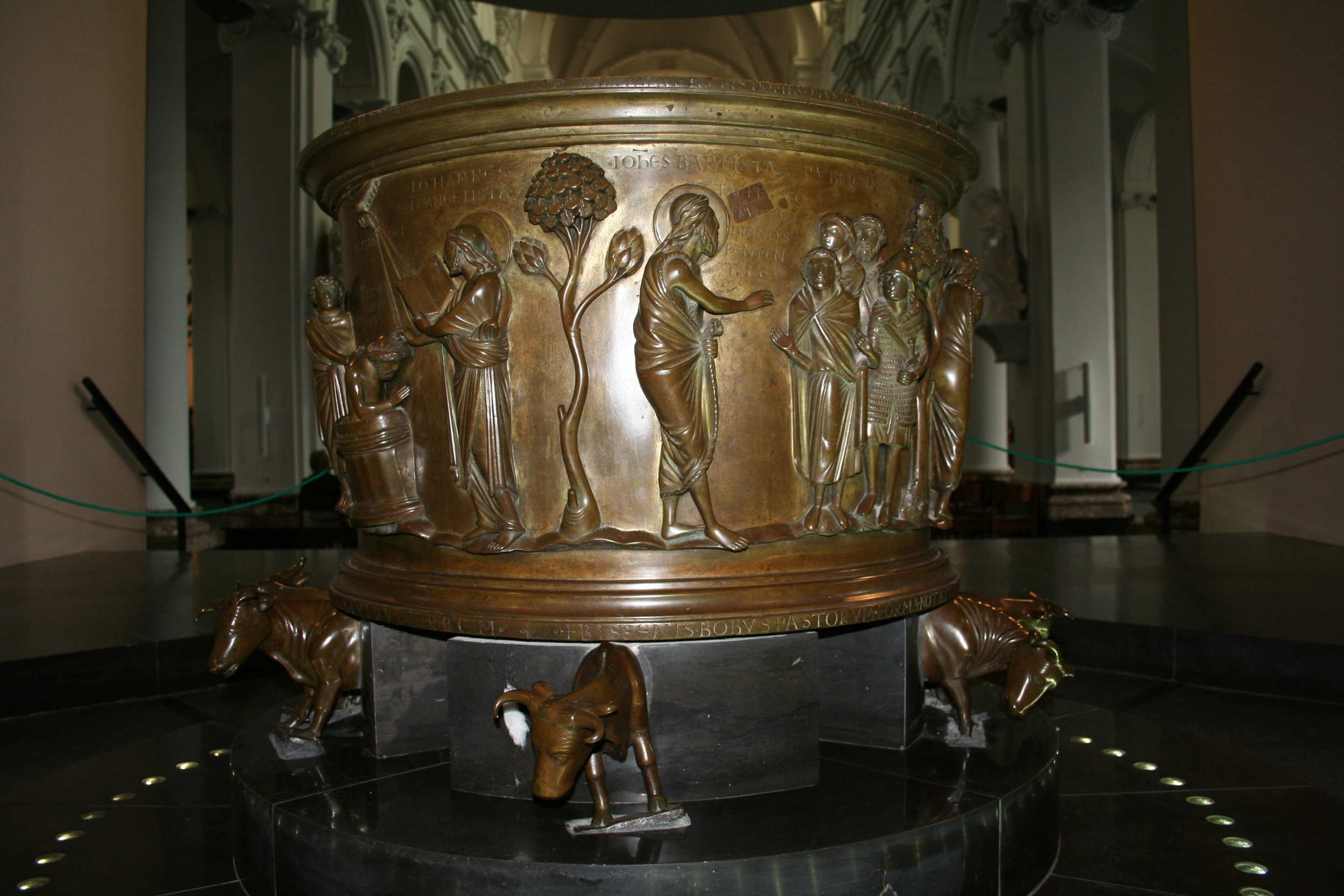
Saint John the Baptist preaching, the start of the sequence of scenes

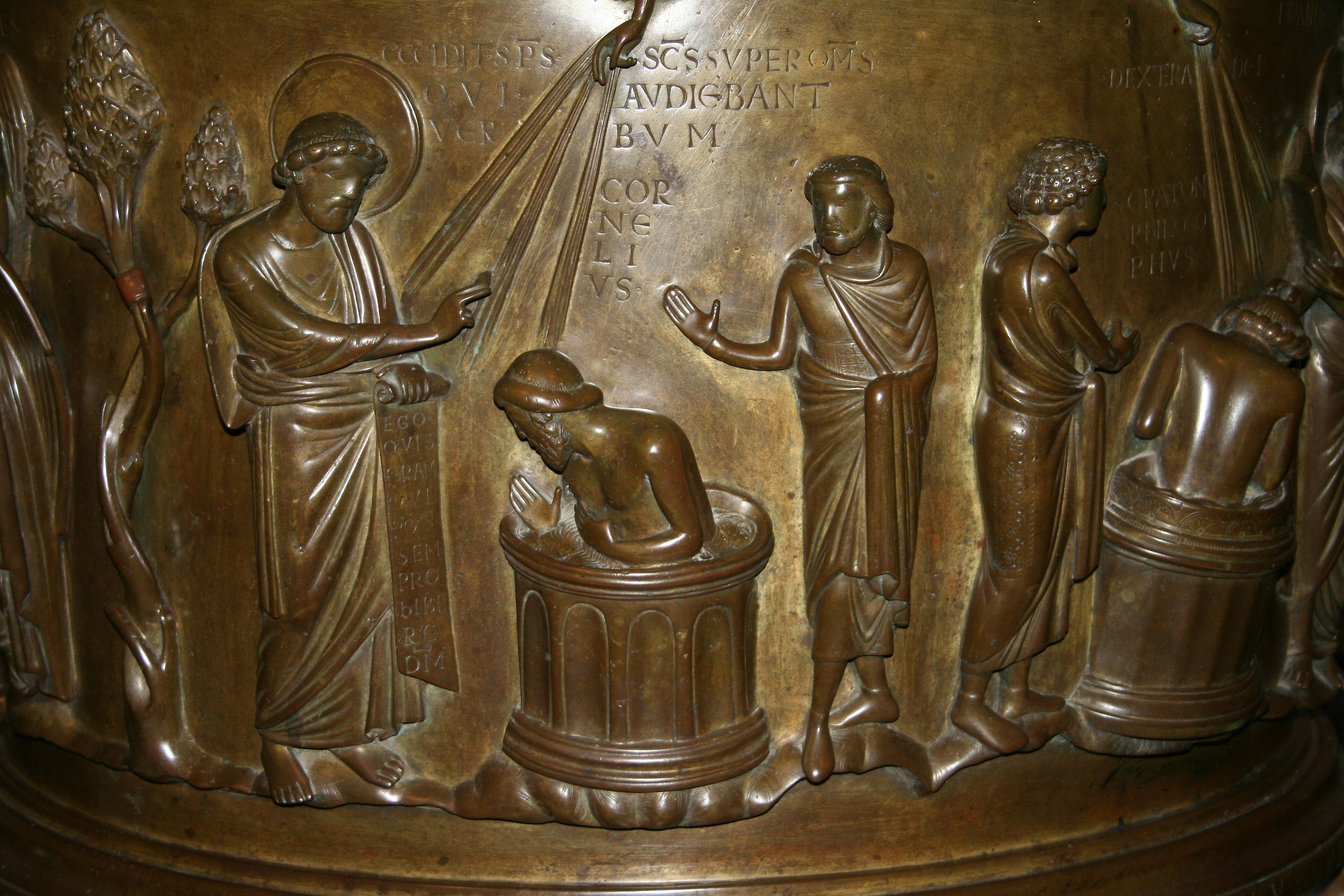
The last two scenes

The basin is 91 centimetres (36 in) across at the top, tapering slightly towards the base, and is variously described as of brass or bronze. It was made by lost wax casting, with the basin cast in a single piece; the size was not necessarily exceptional, as both church bells and cauldrons for large households were probably cast at comparable sizes; some church doors cast in a single piece, though flat, were much larger. The font sat on twelve oxen (two are now missing), who emerged from a stone plinth, a reference to the "molten sea... on twelve oxen" cast in bronze for Solomon's Temple The five scenes shown, identified by Latin inscriptions ("tituli") on the rim above and in the image field, can be read in chronological sequence:

- John the Baptist preaching to four figures, the last on the right in full military gear; followed by a fig tree.
- John baptising two neophytes, with two further figures to the right, who probably represent the two disciples John told to follow Jesus (John 1:35–37). As often in Early Medieval art, the attempt to convey the River Jordan stretching away in perspective has it rise up like a mound. A palm tree follows.
- The Baptism of Christ by John the Baptist, a commonly represented scene, again with the water piling up like a mound. Jesus is beardless and young, as is also typical. The angel to the right of Jesus has his hands veiled with a cloth, a mark of respect in Eastern liturgy, though it may also simply represent a cloth ready for Jesus to dry himself with. An olive tree follows.
- Saint Peter baptising Cornelius the Centurion, the first gentile to be baptised (Acts 10), with a sponsor or godfather. The Hand of God appears from above to signal approval.
- Saint John the Evangelist baptising the "philosopher Craton", also with a sponsor and Hand. A vine follows. The story of Craton comes from apocryphal writings such as the account of John's life by the Pseudo-Abdias.

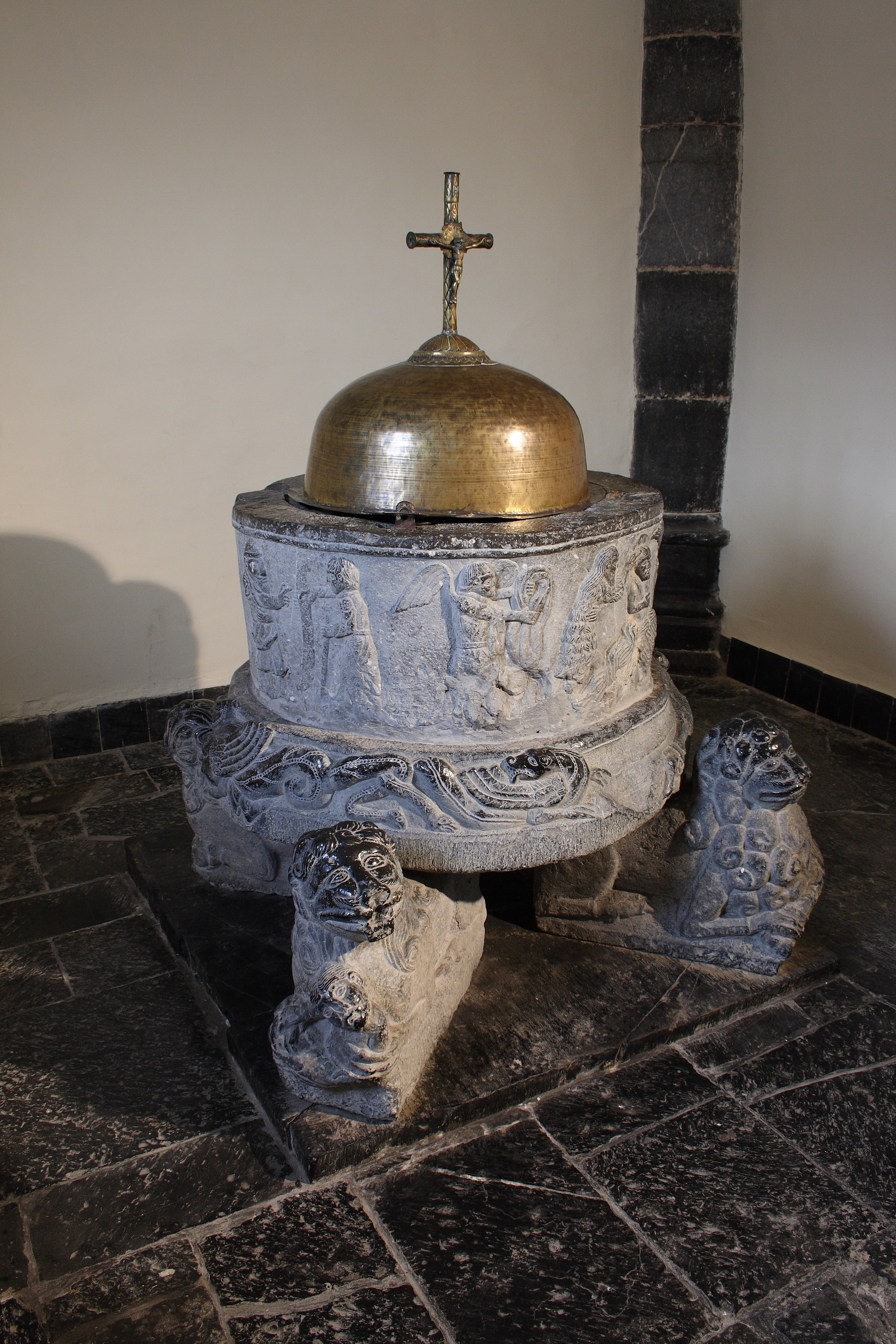
Baptismal font of Furnaux also inspired by Rupert de Deutz

Except for the last two the scenes are separated by trees which are stylised in typical Romanesque fashion, but whose leaf shapes are all different. A continuous undulating ground-line runs all round the basin. Other inscriptions run round the top and bottom rims of the basin. While the baptism of Jesus is very commonly depicted in Early Medieval art, those of the other figures are very rare subjects indeed, and this unusually elaborate and learned programme was no doubt composed with clerical assistance. It does not reflect Byzantine iconographic precedents; instead it matches closely the interest in typology and allegory, of which the influential contemporary Liège-born theologian Rupert of Deutz was a particular exponent (though Rupert was also a particular opponent of the bishop at the time, Otbert of Liège, who took the Emperor's side in the Investiture Controversy). The head of God the Father that appears at the top of the Baptism of Christ (identified as PATER) is an early appearance of God the Father in Western art; a Hand of God, more typical of the period, appears in the baptism scenes of Cornelius and Craton.

The baptismal font in the little village of Furnaux (Mettet), relatively far from Liège but at that time in the same diocese, has the same theological background linking Rupert de Deutz's theological vision where the Old Testament and New Testament are closely linked.
