= Bronze sculpture =

Sculpture cast in bronze

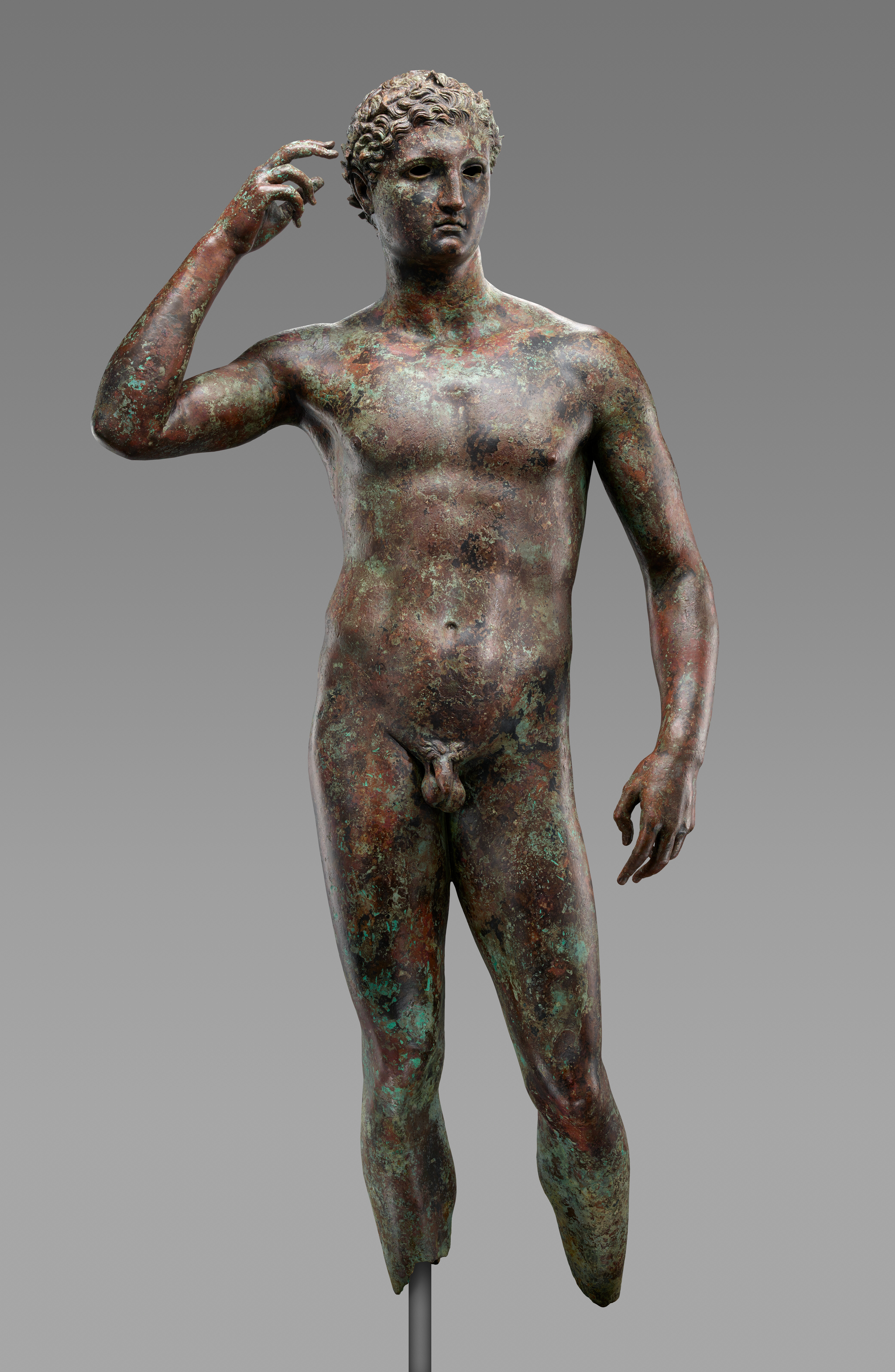
The Victorious Youth (between 4th-2nd centuries BC), is a water-preserved bronze from ancient Greece.

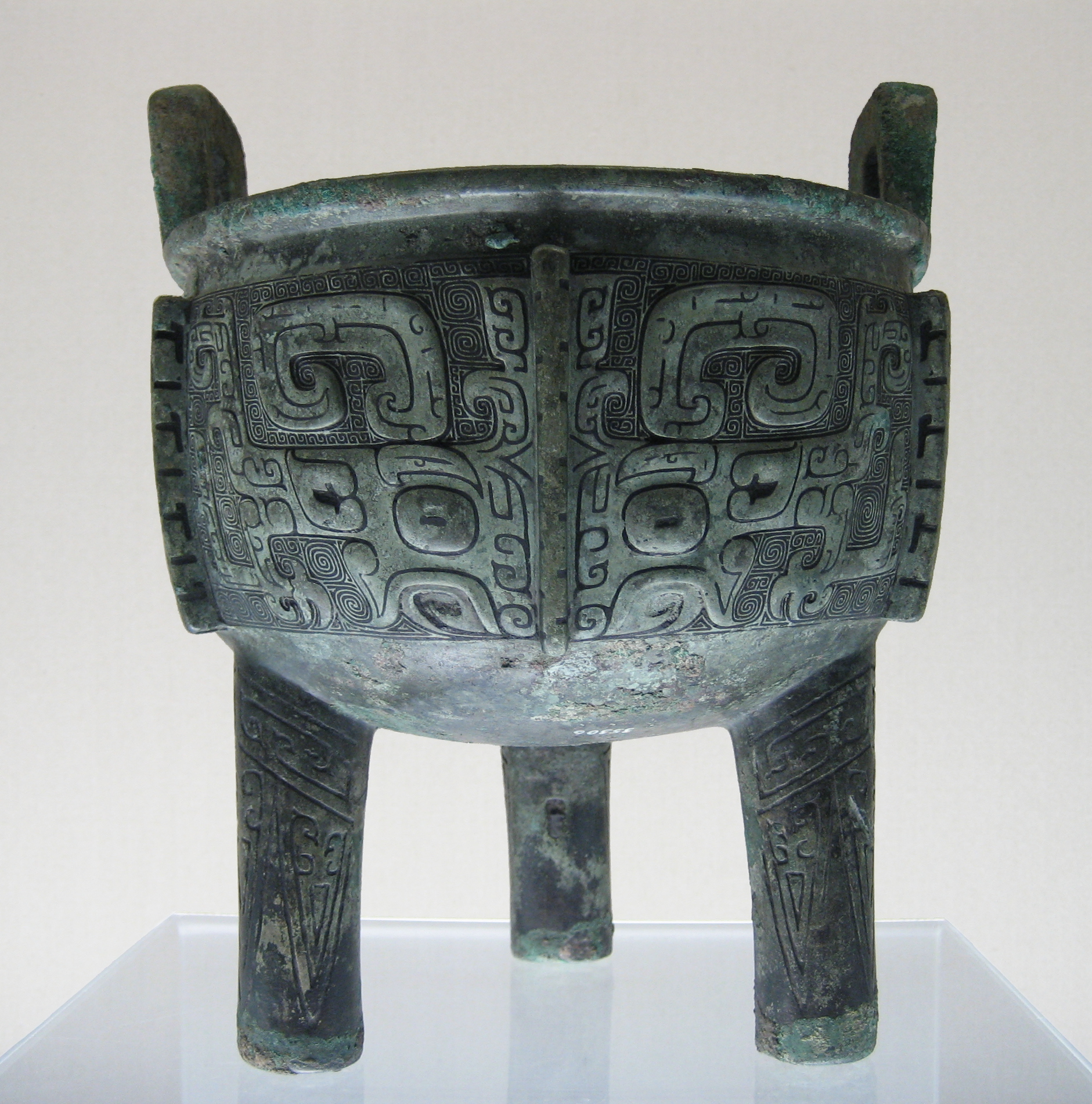
Chinese ritual bronze, a Late Shang dǐng.

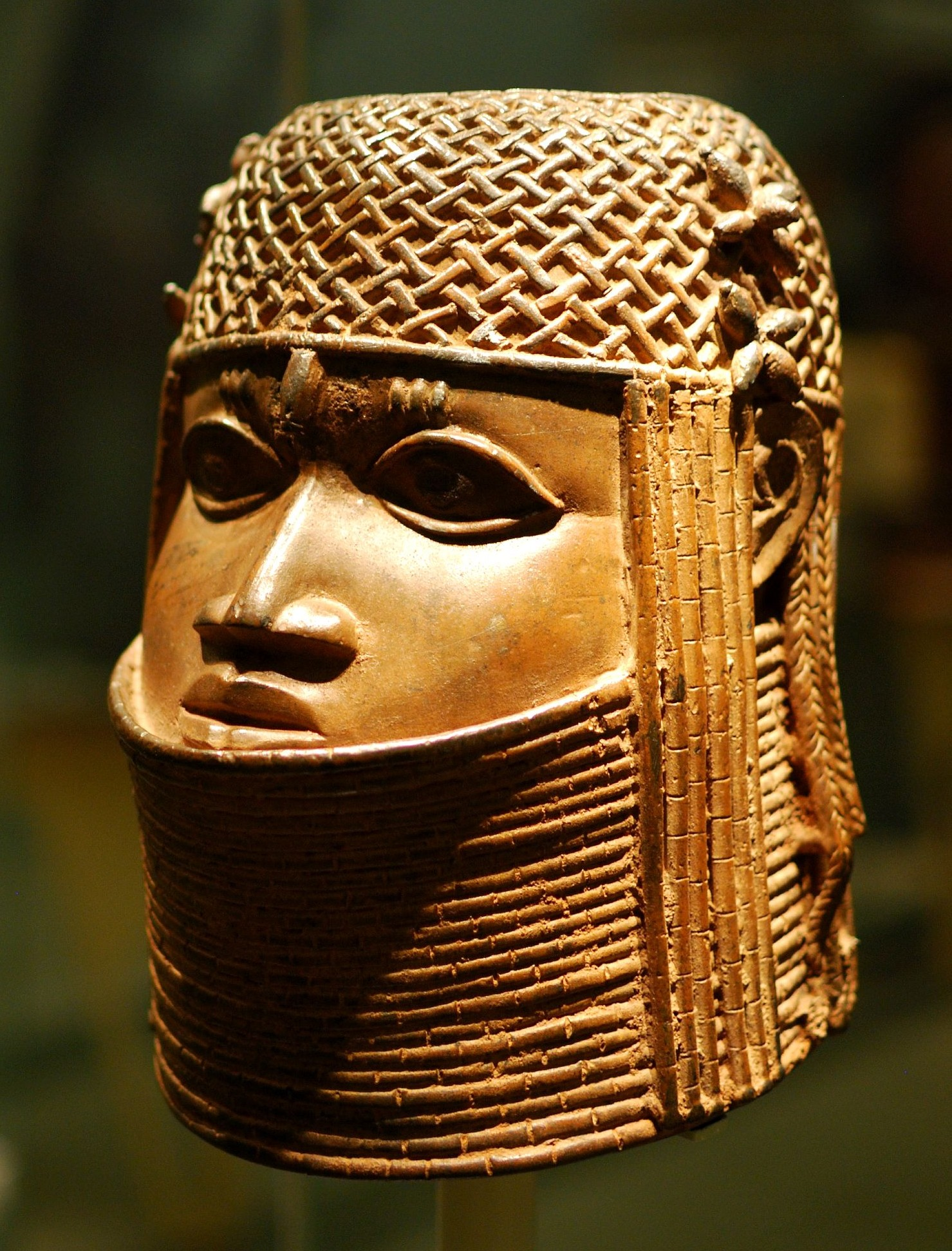
Benin bronze of a woman's head, 16th century AD.

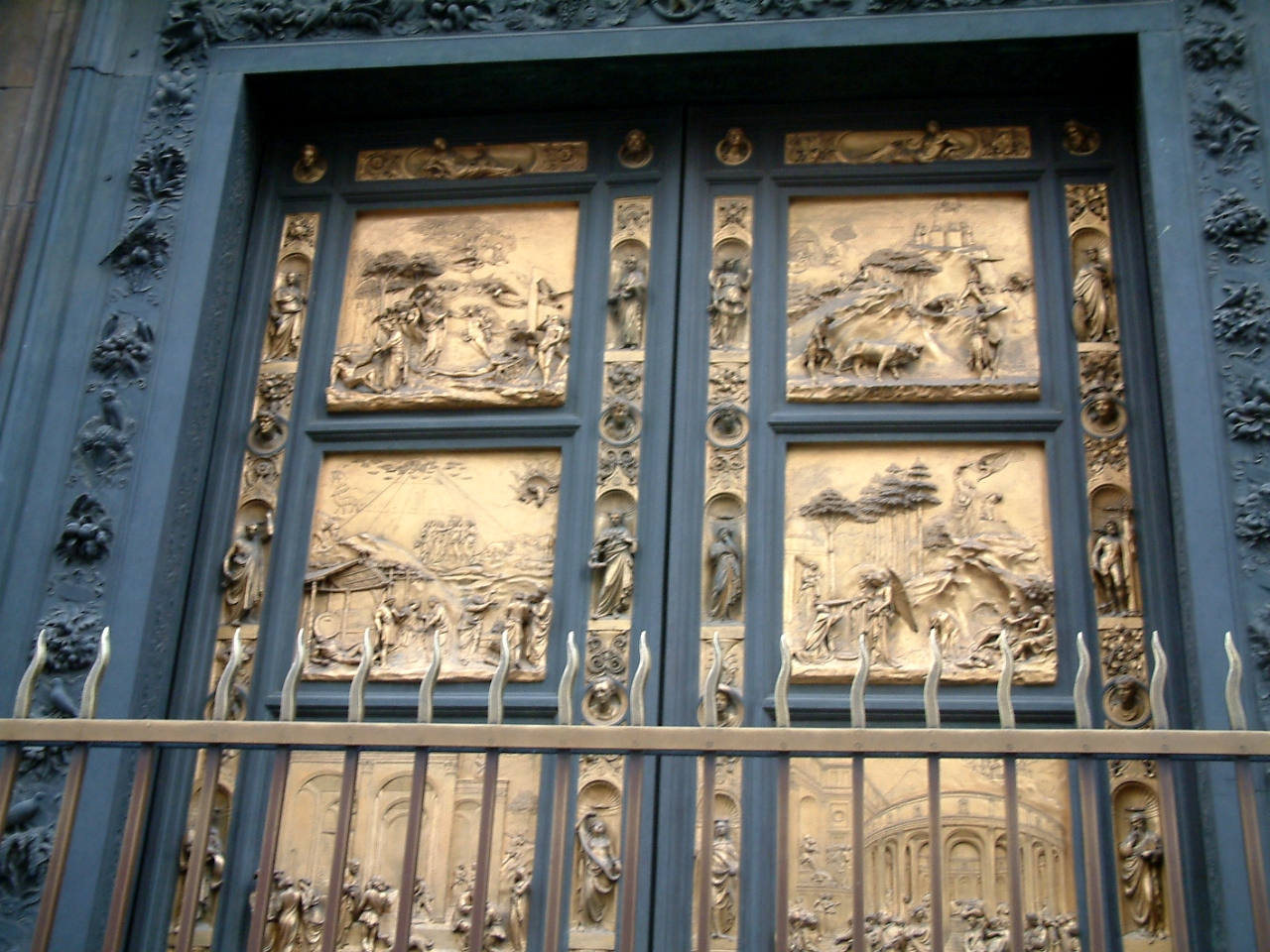
Gilt-bronze doors of the Baptistry of Florence Cathedral (Lorenzo Ghiberti, 1401–22).

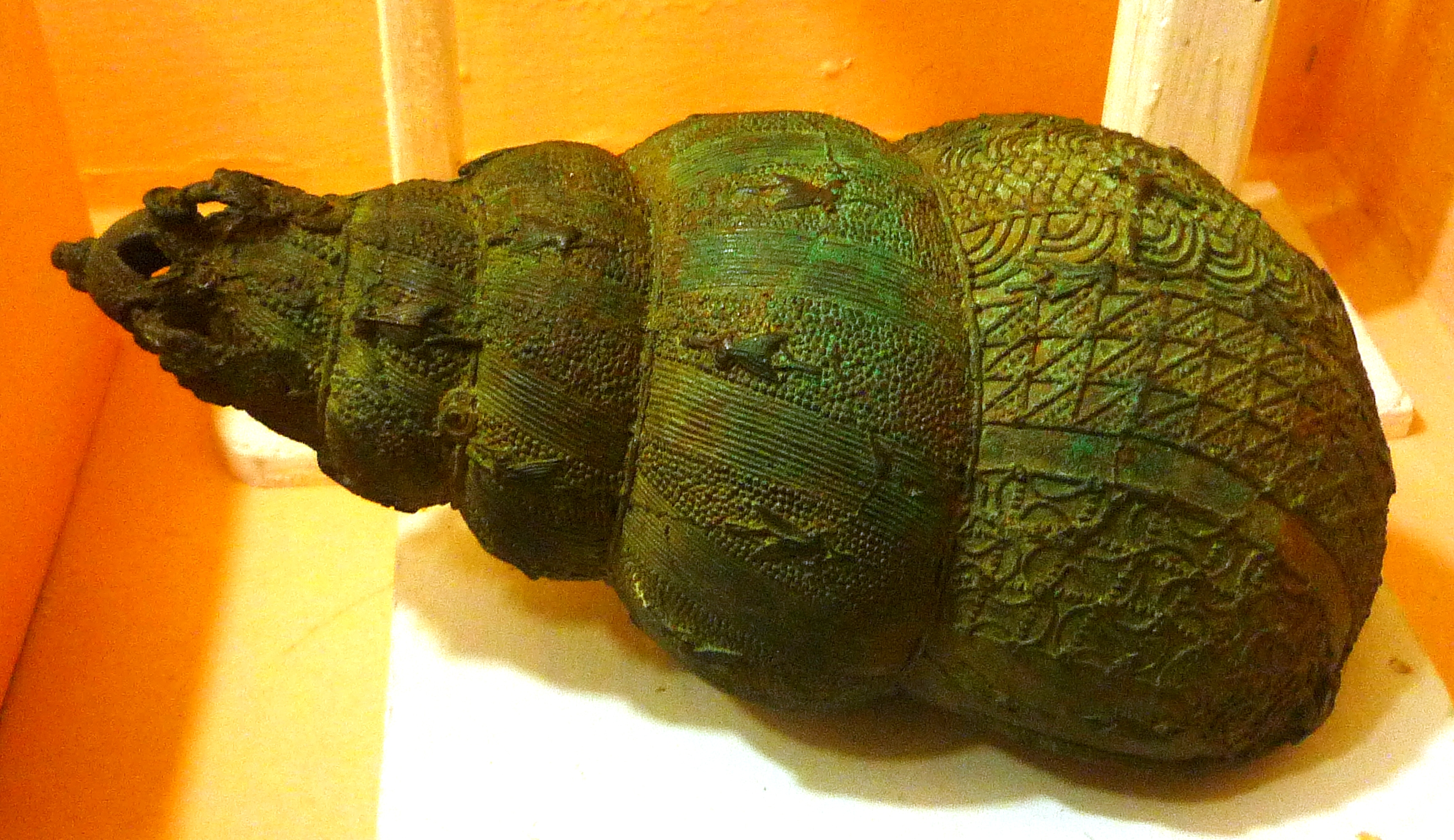
9th-century bronze vessel in form of a snail shell excavated in Igbo-Ukwu,(part of igbo tribe in Nigeria).

Bronze is the most popular metal for cast metal sculptures; a cast bronze sculpture is often called simply "a bronze". It can be used for statues, singly or in groups, reliefs, and small statuettes and figurines, as well as bronze elements to be fitted to other objects such as furniture. It is often gilded to give gilt-bronze or ormolu.

Common bronze alloys have the unusual and desirable property of expanding slightly just before they set, thus filling the finest details of a mould. Then, as the bronze cools, it shrinks a little, making it easier to separate from the mould. Their strength and ductility (lack of brittleness) is an advantage when figures in action poses are to be created, especially when compared to various ceramic or stone materials (such as marble sculpture). These qualities allow the creation of extended figures, as in Jeté, or figures that have small cross sections in their support, such as the equestrian statue of Richard the Lionheart.

But the value of the bronze for uses other than making statues is disadvantageous to the preservation of sculptures; few large ancient bronzes have survived, as many were melted down to make weapons or ammunition in times of war or to create new sculptures commemorating the victors, while far more stone and ceramic works have come through the centuries, even if only in fragments. As recently as 2007 several life-sized bronze sculptures by John Waddell were stolen, probably due to the value of the metal after the work has been melted.

== Material ==
There are many different bronze alloys. Typically modern bronze is 88% copper and 12% tin. Alpha bronze consists of the alpha solid solution of tin in copper. Alpha bronze alloys of 4–5% tin are used to make coins and a number of mechanical applications. Historical bronzes are highly variable in composition, as most metalworkers probably used whatever scrap was on hand; the metal of the 12th-century English Gloucester Candlestick is bronze containing a mixture of copper, zinc, tin, lead, nickel, iron, antimony, arsenic with an unusually large amount of silver – between 22.5% in the base and 5.76% in the pan below the candle. The proportions of this mixture may suggest that the candlestick was made from a hoard of old coins. The Benin Bronzes are really brass, and the Romanesque Baptismal font at St Bartholomew's Church, Liège is described as both bronze and brass.

In the Bronze Age, two forms of bronze were commonly used: "classic bronze", about 10% tin, was used in casting; and "mild bronze", about 6% tin, was hammered from ingots to make sheets. Bladed weapons were mostly cast from classic bronze, while helmets and armour were hammered from mild bronze. According to one definition, modern "statuary bronze" is 90% copper and 10% tin.

== History ==
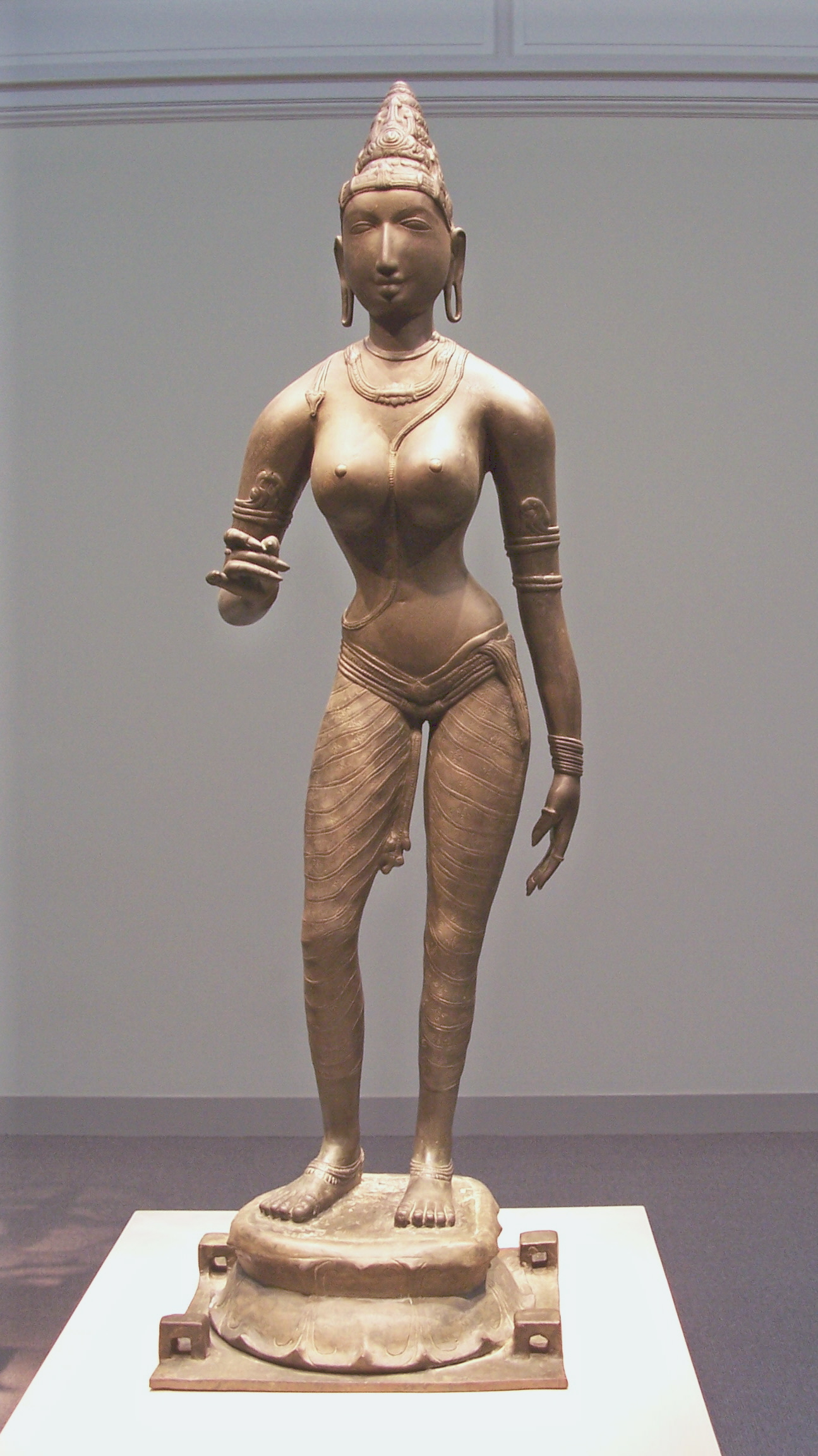
Chola bronze of Queen Sembiyan Mahadevi as the goddess Parvati.

The great civilizations of the old world worked in bronze for art, from the time of the introduction of the alloy for tools and edged weapons. Dancing Girl from Mohenjo-daro, belonging to the Indus Valley Civilisation and dating back to c. 2500 BCE, is perhaps the first known bronze statue. Life-sized bronze statues in Ancient Greece have been found in good condition; one is the seawater-preserved bronze Victorious Youth that required painstaking efforts to bring it to its present state for museum display. Far more Roman bronze statues have survived.

The ancient Chinese knew both lost-wax casting and section mould casting, and during the Shang dynasty created large numbers of Chinese ritual bronzes, ritual vessels covered with complex decoration, which were buried in sets of up to 200 pieces in the tombs of royalty and the nobility. Over the long creative period of Egyptian dynastic art, small lost-wax bronze figurines were made in large numbers; several thousand of them have been conserved in museum collections.

The Nuragic civilization in the Mediterranean island of Sardinia produced a large number of small bronze statues, known as bronzetti (Nuragic bronze statuettes), starting from the 12th century BCE.

The 7th-8th century Sri Lankan Sinhalese bronze statue of Buddhist Tara, now in the British Museum, is an example of Sri Lankan bronze statues.

From the ninth through the thirteenth century the Chola dynasty in South India represented the pinnacle of bronze casting in India.

== Process ==
Making bronzes is highly skilled work, and a number of distinct casting processes may be employed, including lost-wax casting (and its modern-day spin-off investment casting), sand casting and centrifugal casting. The term "bronze" is also applied to metal sculptures made by electrotyping (or galvanoplasty), although these sculptures are typically pure copper and their fabrication does not involve metal casting.

=== Lost wax method ===
In lost-wax or investment casting, the artist starts with a full-sized model of the sculpture, most often a non-drying oil-based clay such as Plasticine model for smaller sculptures or for sculptures to be developed over an extended period (water-based clays must be protected from drying), and water-based clay for larger sculptures or for sculptures for which it is desired to capture a gestural quality – one that transmits the motion of the sculptor in addition to that of the subject. A mould is made from the clay pattern, either as a piece mould from plaster, or using flexible gel or similar rubber-like materials stabilized by a plaster jacket of several pieces. Often a plaster master will be made from this mould for further refinement. Such a plaster is a means of preserving the artwork until a patron may be found to finance a bronze casting, either from the original moulds or from a new mould made from the refined plaster positive.

Once a production mould is obtained, a wax (hollow for larger sculptures) is then cast from the mould. For a hollow sculpture, a core is then cast into the void, and is retained in its proper location (after wax melting) by pins of the same metal used for casting. One or more wax sprues are added to conduct the molten metal into the sculptures - typically directing the liquid metal from a pouring cup to the bottom of the sculpture, which is then filled from the bottom up in order to avoid splashing and turbulence. Additional sprues may be directed upward at intermediate positions, and various vents may also be added where gases could be trapped. (Vents are not needed for ceramic shell casting, allowing the sprue to be simple and direct). The complete wax structure (and core, if previously added) is then invested in another kind of mould or shell, which is heated in a kiln until the wax runs out and all free moisture is removed. The investment is then soon filled with molten bronze. The removal of all wax and moisture prevents the liquid metal from being explosively ejected from the mould by steam and vapour.

Students of bronze casting will usually work in direct wax, where the model is made in wax, possibly formed over a core, or with a core cast in place, if the piece is to be hollow. If no mould is made and the casting process fails, the artwork will also be lost. After the metal has cooled, the external ceramic or clay is chipped away, revealing an image of the wax form, including core pins, sprues, vents, and risers. All of these are removed with a saw and tool marks are polished away, and interior core material is removed to reduce the likelihood of interior corrosion. Incomplete voids created by gas pockets or investment inclusions are then corrected by welding and carving. Small defects where sprues and vents were attached are filed or ground down and polished.

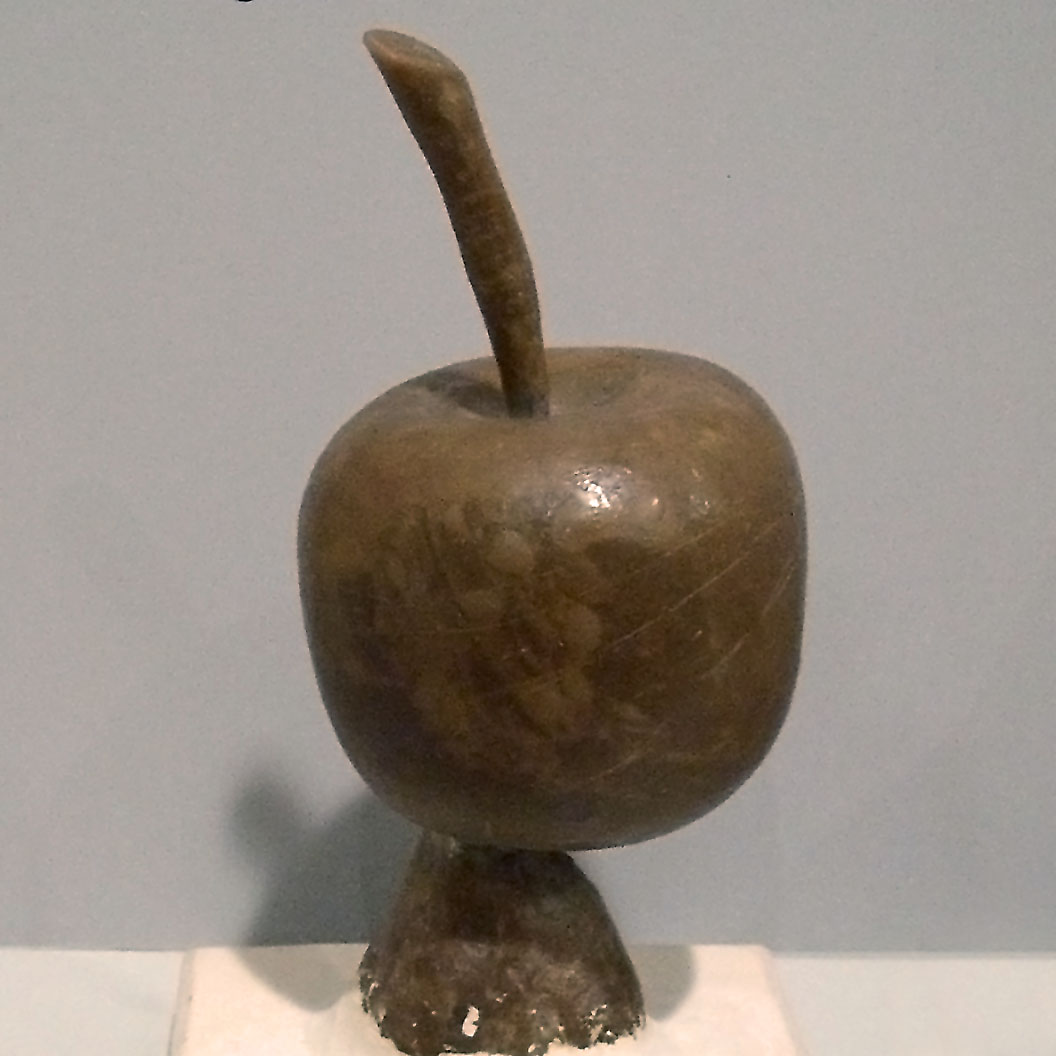
A model of an apple in wax. This is the first step of the lost-wax casting process in bronze

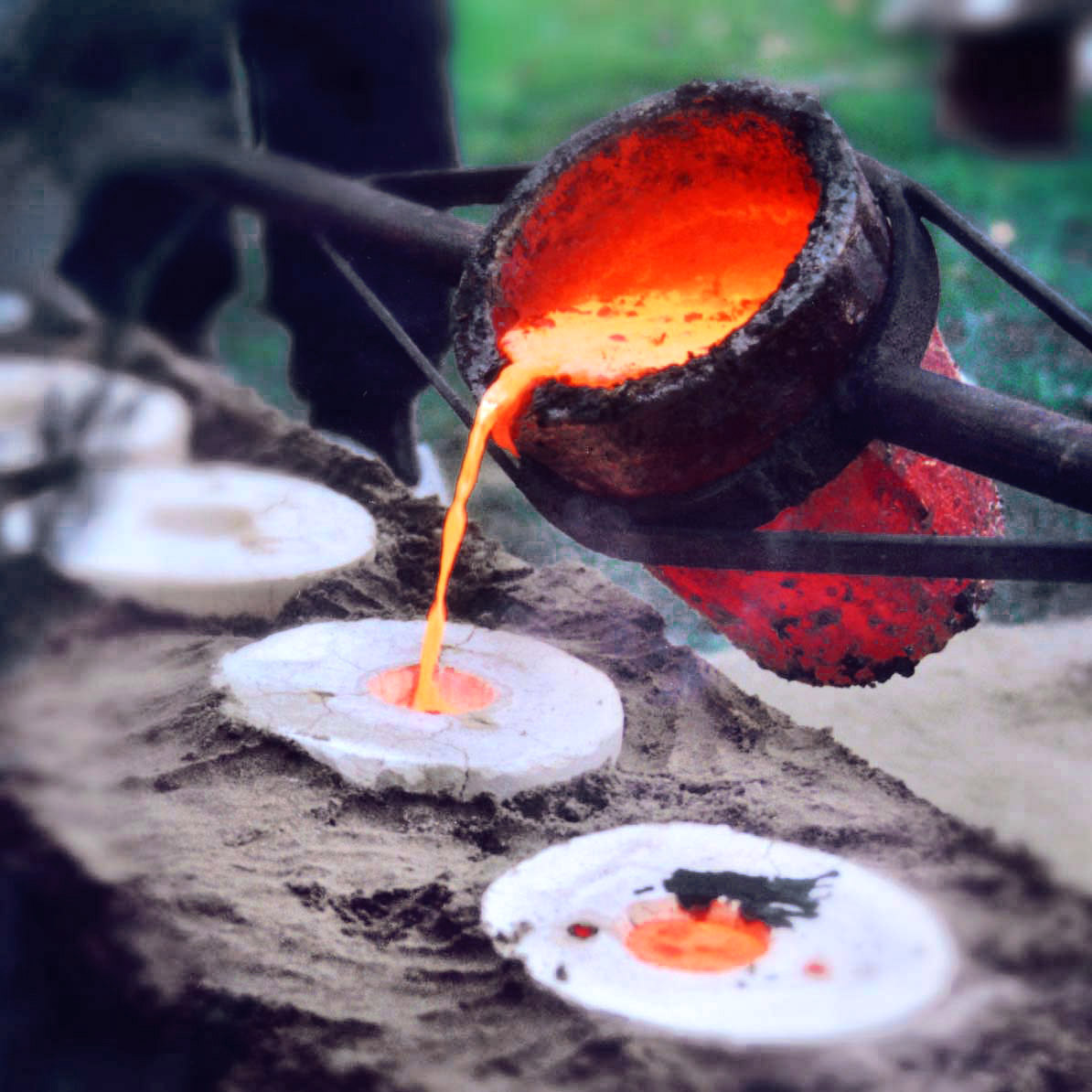
Liquid bronze at 1200 °C is poured into the dried and empty casting mould

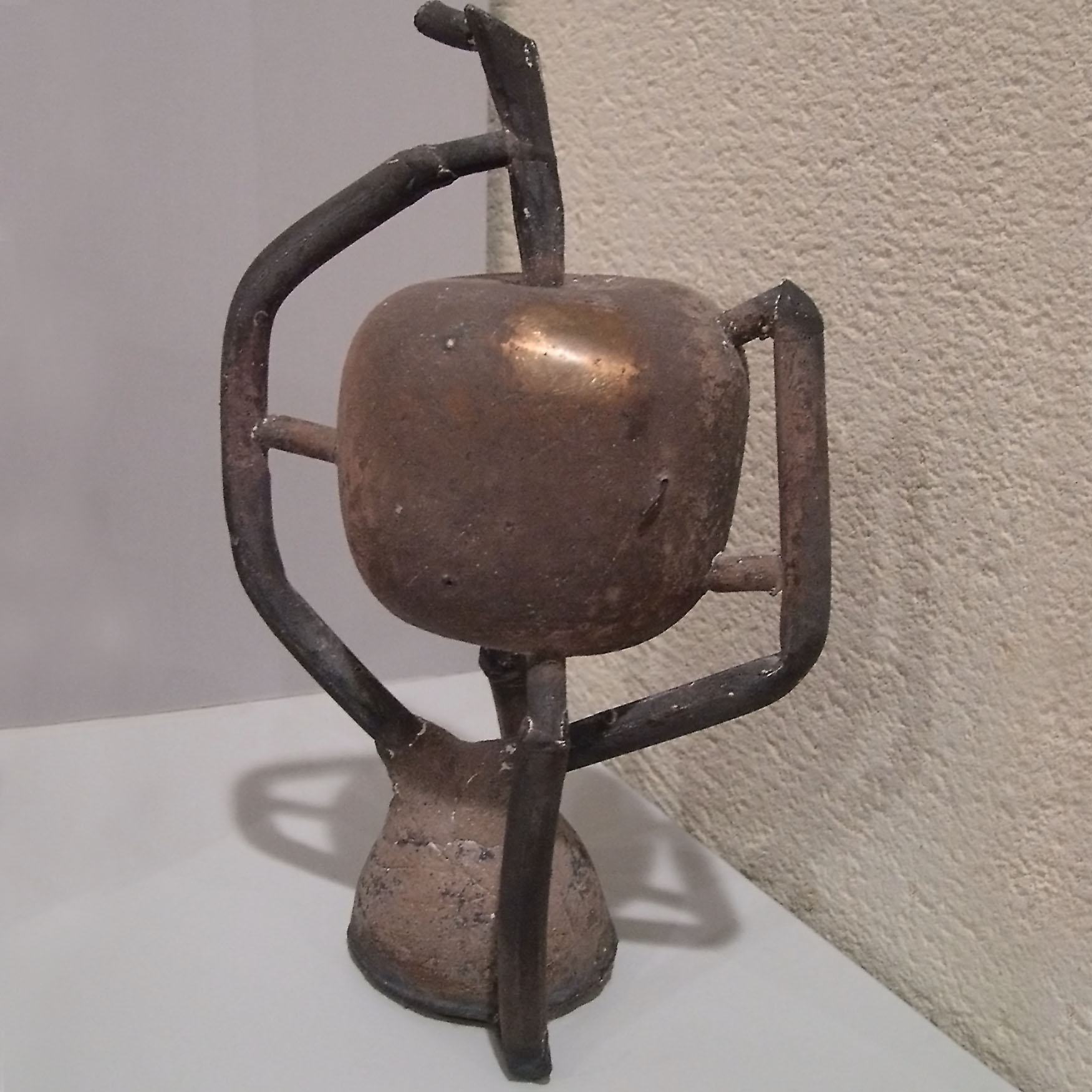
The sculpture of the apple, just extracted from its mould. Below is the funnel through which the bronze was poured (upside down). This is the last step of the lost-wax casting process

=== Creating large sculptures ===
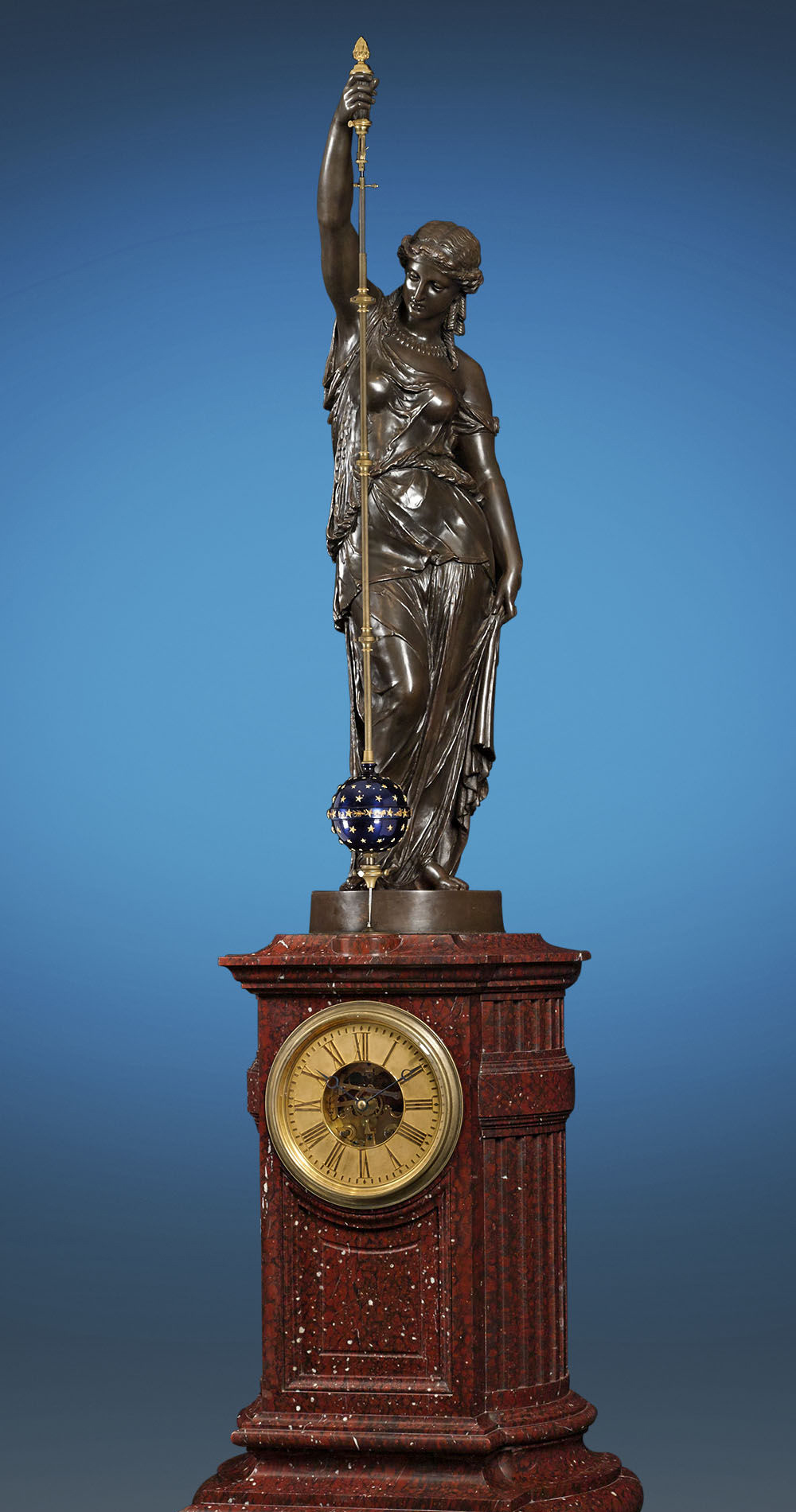
A monumental conical pendulum clock by Eugène Farcot with a patinated bronze statue.

For a large sculpture, the artist will usually prepare small study models until the pose and proportions are determined. An intermediate-sized model is then constructed with all of the final details. For very large works, this may again be scaled to a larger intermediate. From the final scale model, measuring devices are used to determine the dimensions of an armature for the structural support of a full-size temporary piece, which is brought to rough form by wood, cardboard, plastic foam, and/or paper to approximately fill the volume while keeping the weight low. Finally, plaster, clay or other material is used to form the full-size model, from which a mould may be constructed. Alternatively, a large refractory core may be constructed, and the direct-wax method then applied for subsequent investment. Before modern welding techniques, large sculptures were generally cast in one piece with a single pour. Welding allows a large sculpture to be cast in pieces, then joined.

=== Finishing ===
After final polishing, corrosive materials may be applied to form a patina, a process that allows some control over the colour and finish.

Another form of sculptural art that uses bronze is ormolu, a finely cast soft bronze that is gilded (coated with gold) to produce a matte gold finish. Ormolu was popularized in the 18th century in France and is found in such forms as wall sconces (wall-mounted candle holders), inkstands, clocks and garnitures. Ormolu wares can be identified by a clear ring when tapped, showing that they are made of bronze, not a cheaper alloy such as spelter or pewter.

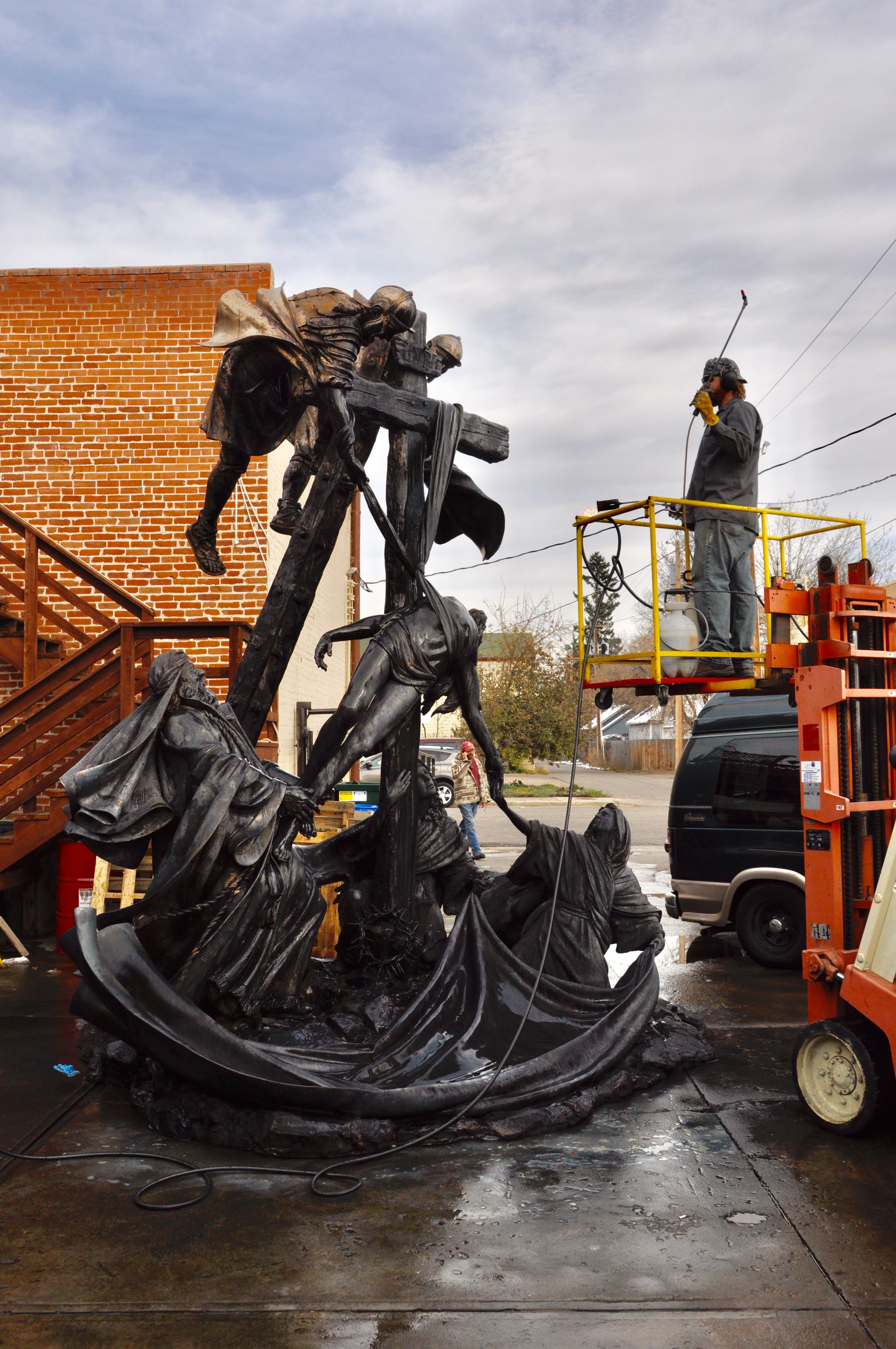
Patina work done on a Lundeen Sculpture artwork, station 13 of the Stations of the Cross

== Gallery ==
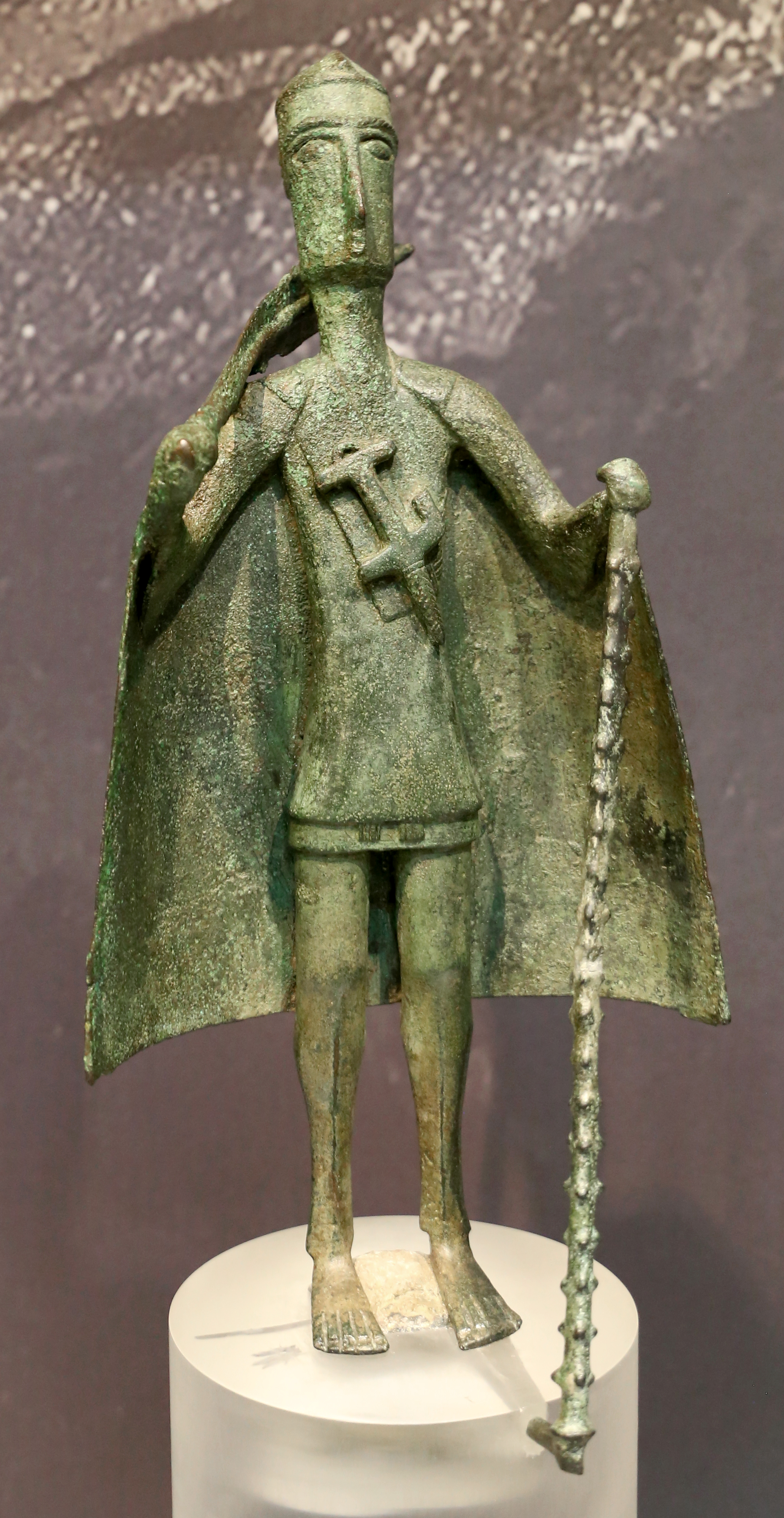
Nuragic bronze statuette from Iron Age Sardinia, currently at National Archaeological Museum, Cagliari.

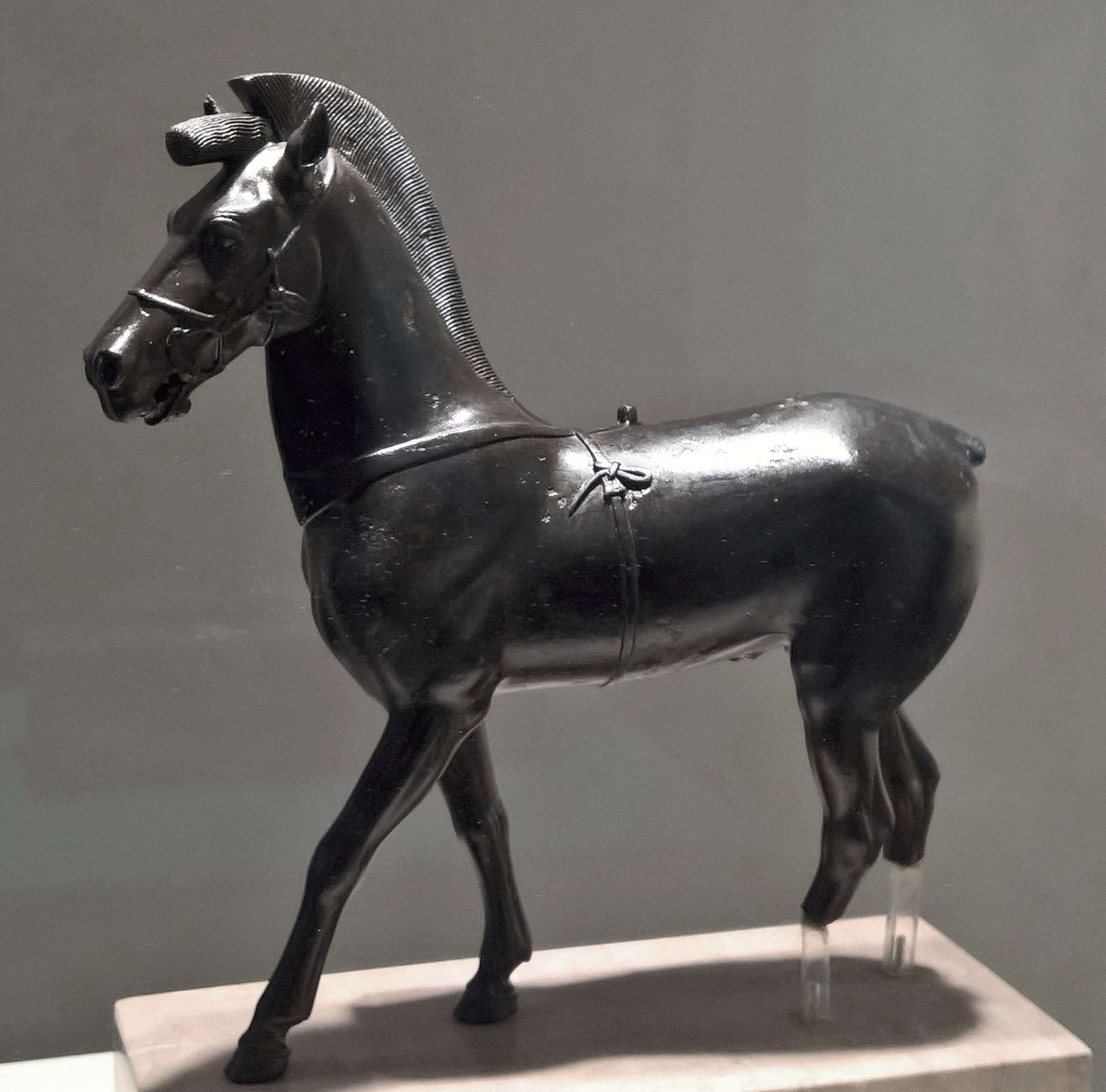
Bronze statuette of a horse, solid cast, early 5th century BC, Argive workshop.

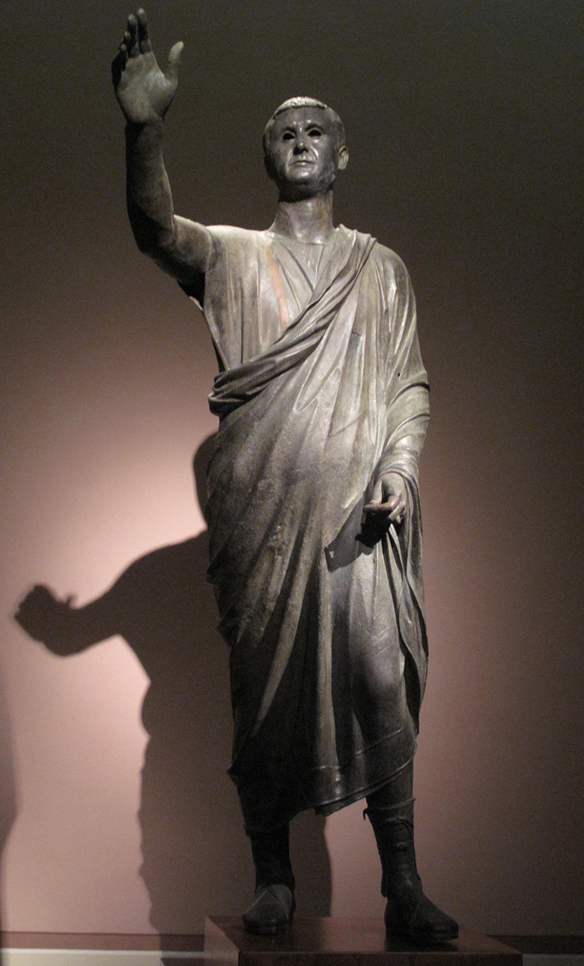
The Orator, c. 100 BC, an Etrusco-Roman bronze statue depicting Aule Metele (Latin: Aulus Metellus), an Etruscan man wearing a Roman toga while engaged in rhetoric; the statue features an inscription in the Etruscan alphabet

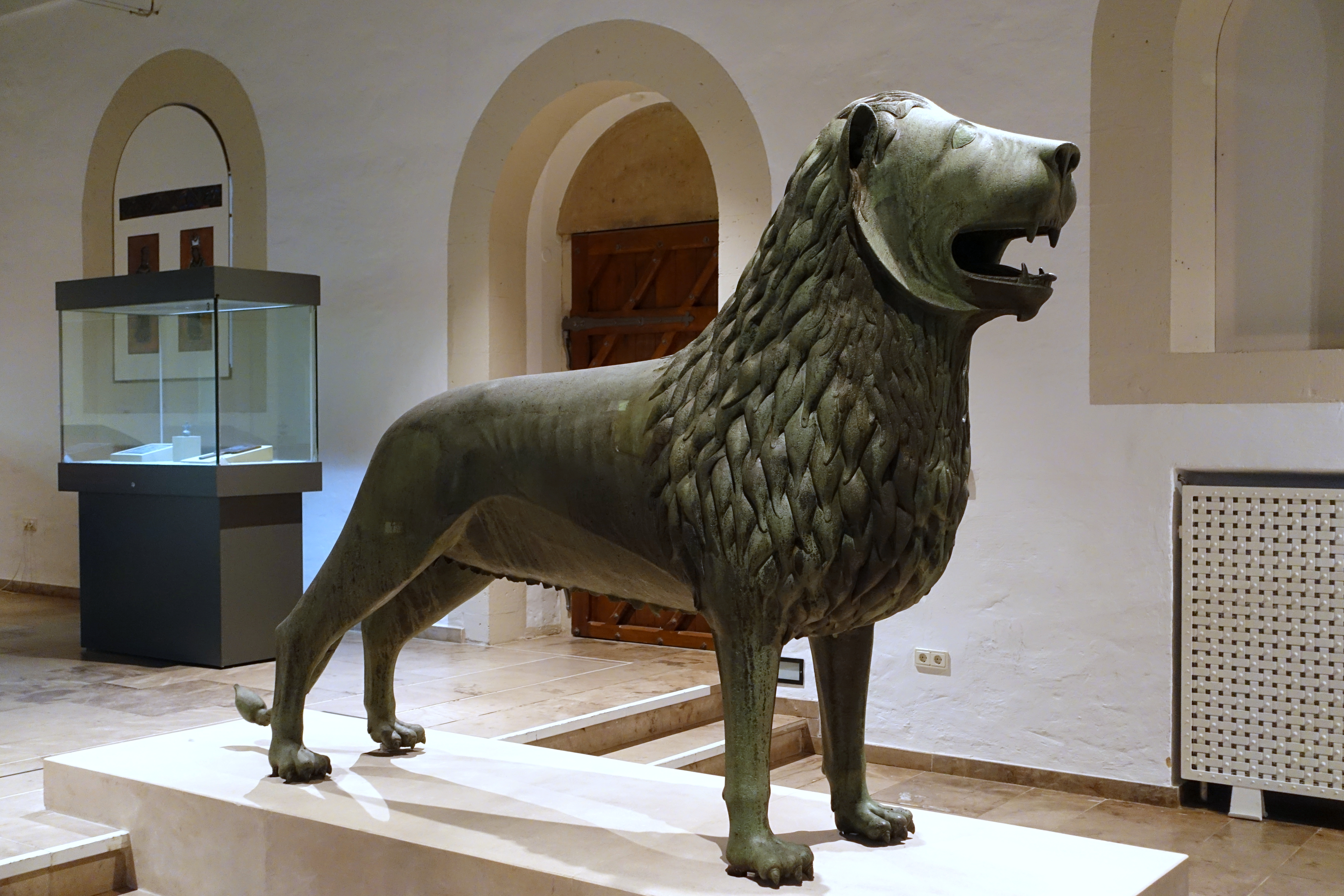
Brunswick Lion, c. 1166, in Brunswick, Germany

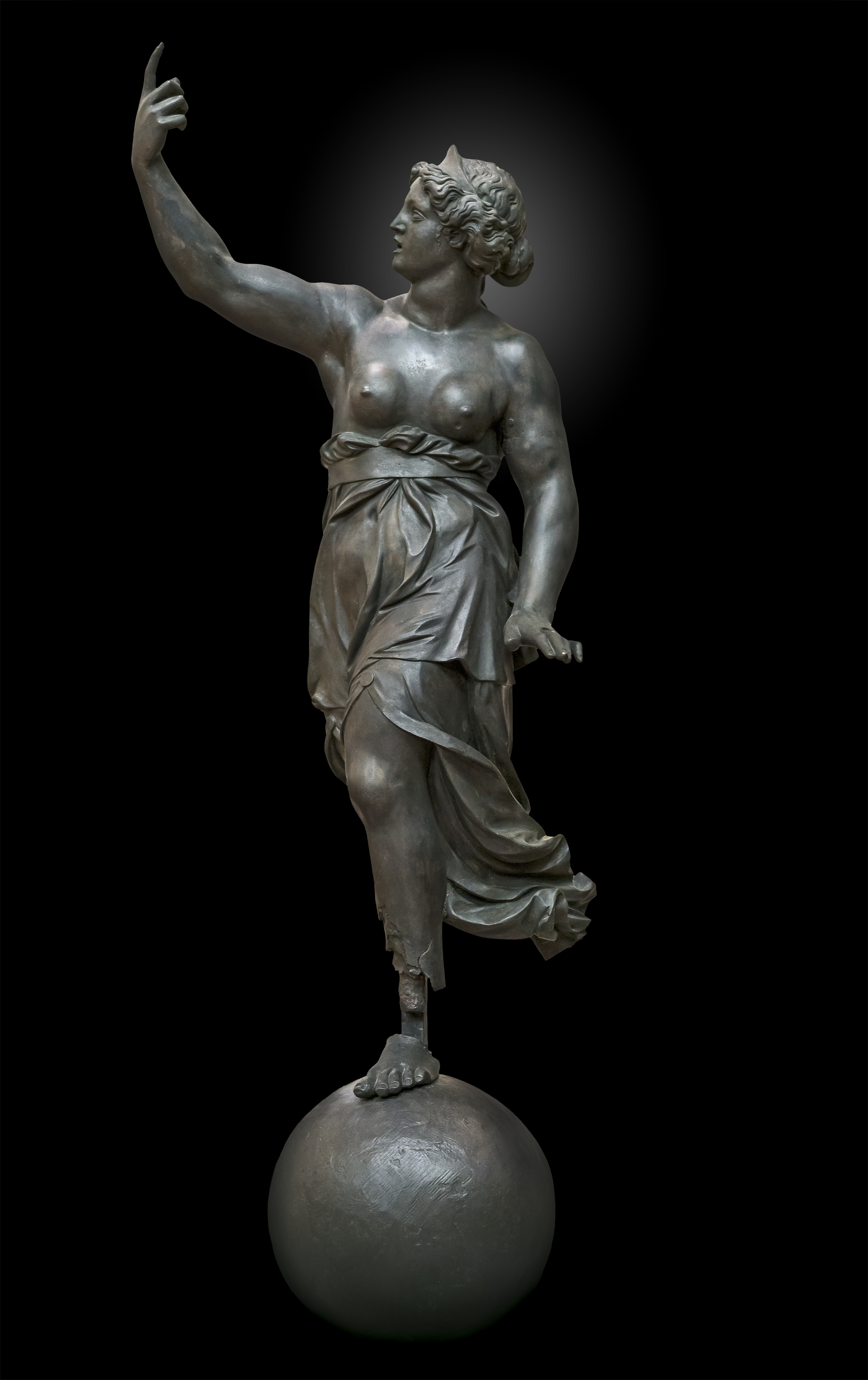
Lady Tholose, Jean Rancy, 1544-50, in Toulouse, France

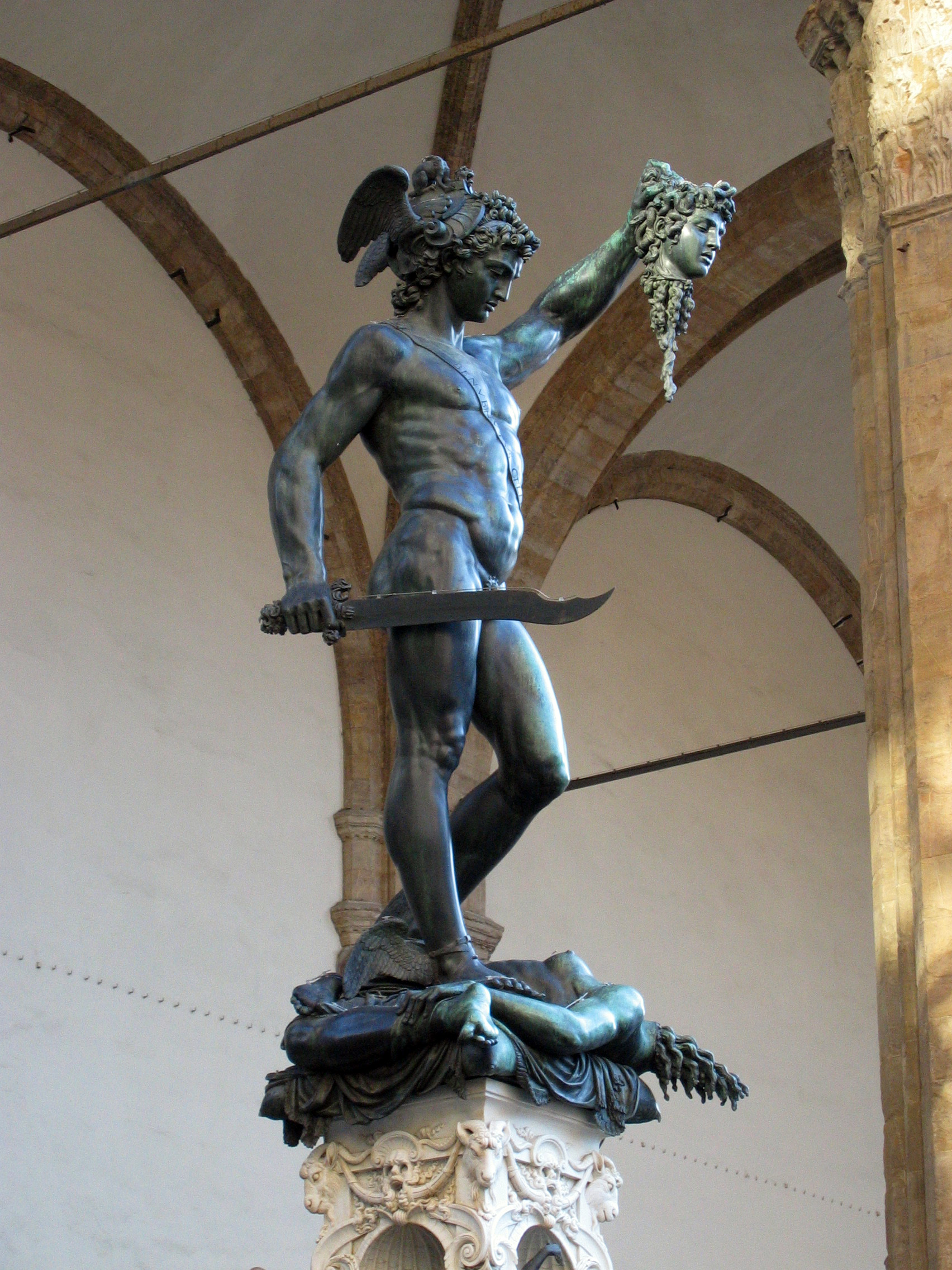
Perseus with the Head of Medusa, Benvenuto Cellini, 1545–54, in the Loggia dei Lanzi at the Piazza della Signoria in Florence, Italy (after the statue's cleaning)

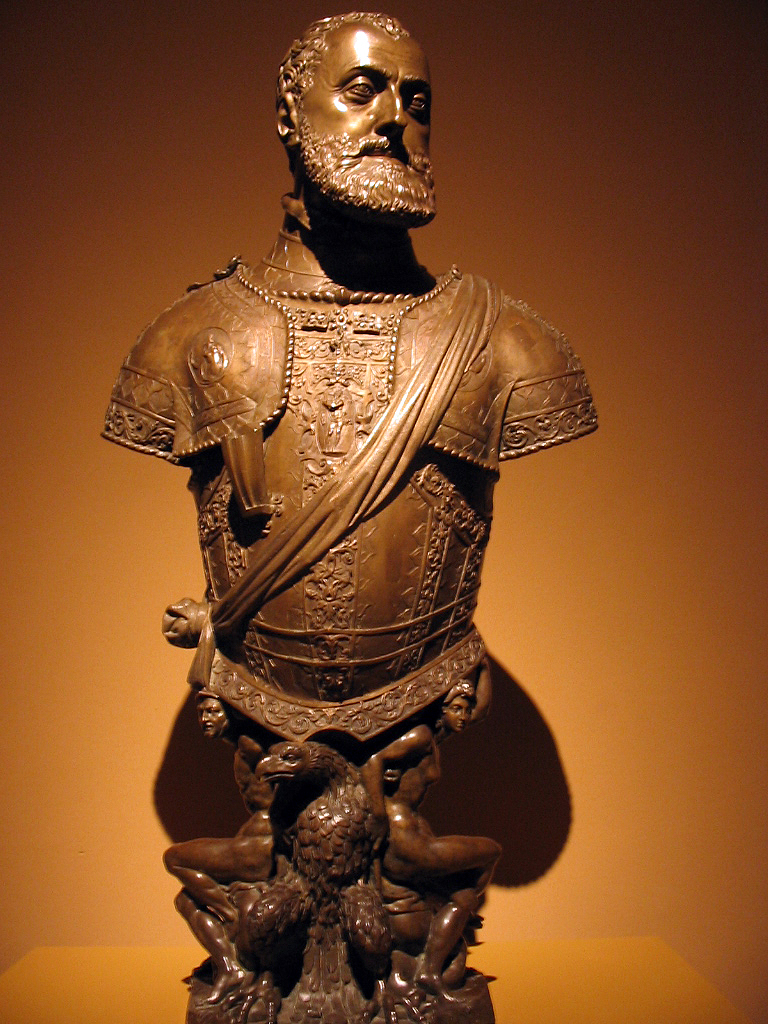
Charles V, Holy Roman Emperor, Leone Leoni, mid-16th century

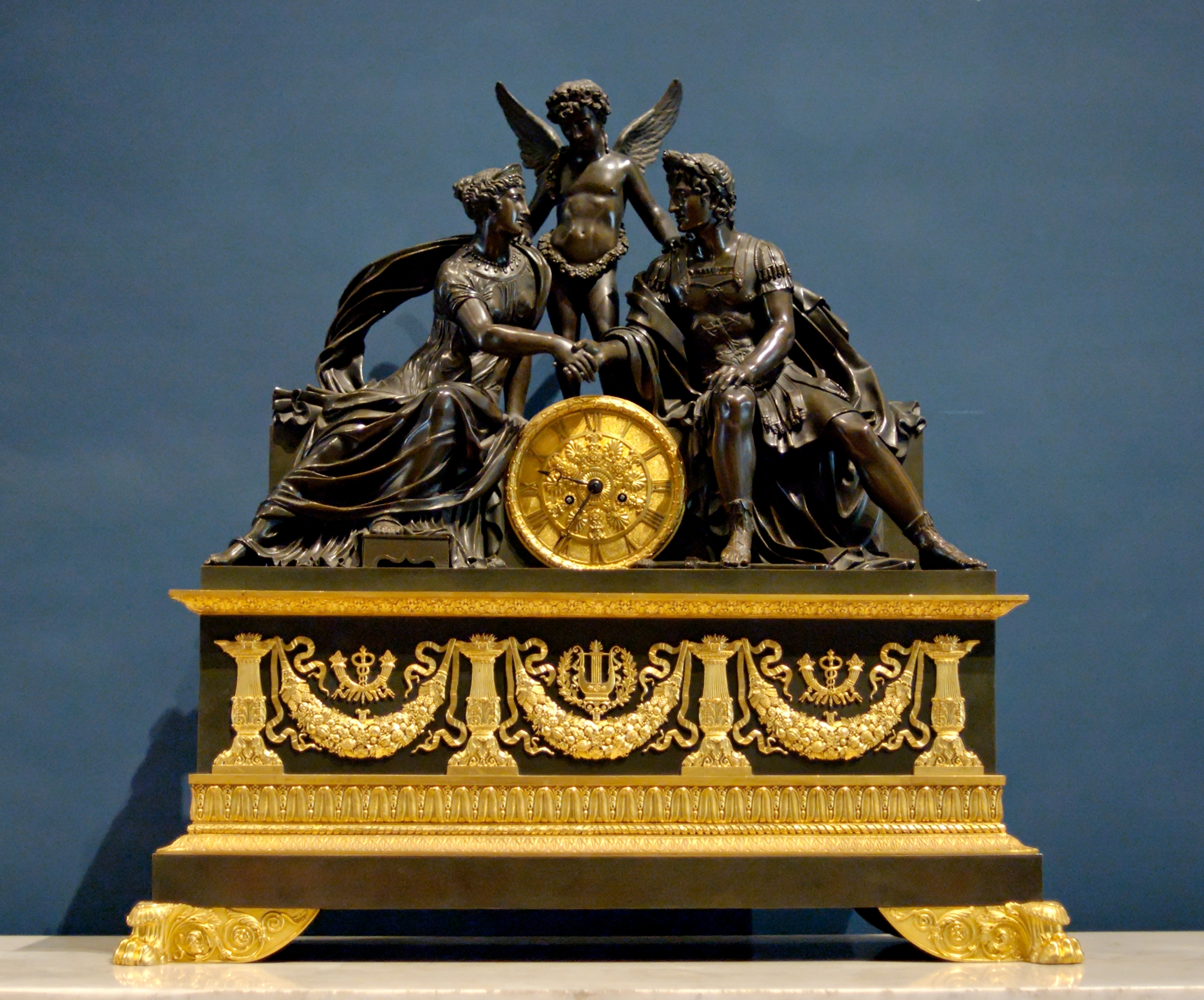
Patinated bronze (above) and ormolu (below) Empire style clock, c. 1810, by Pierre-Philippe Thomire

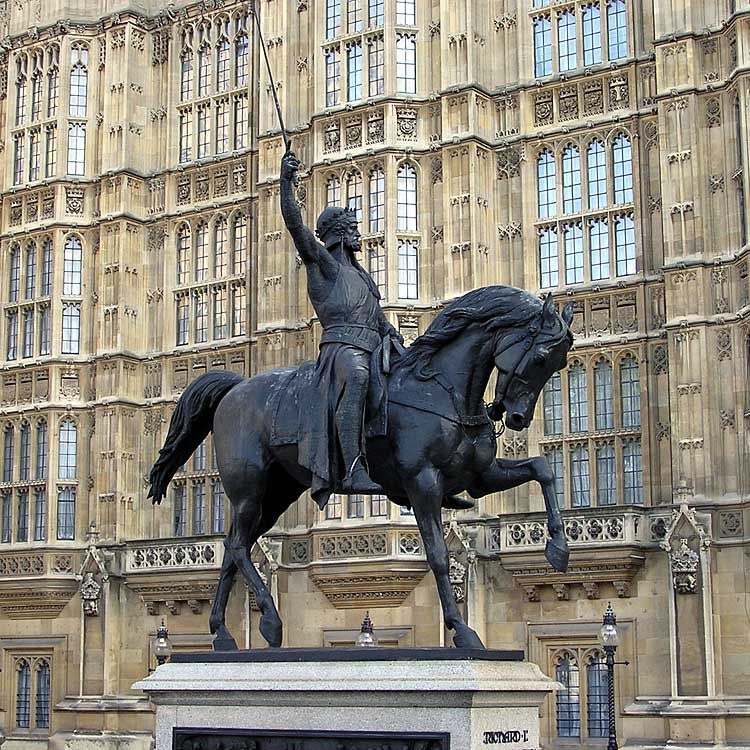
Richard the Lionheart (Carlo Marochetti, 1860), outside the Palace of Westminster in London, England

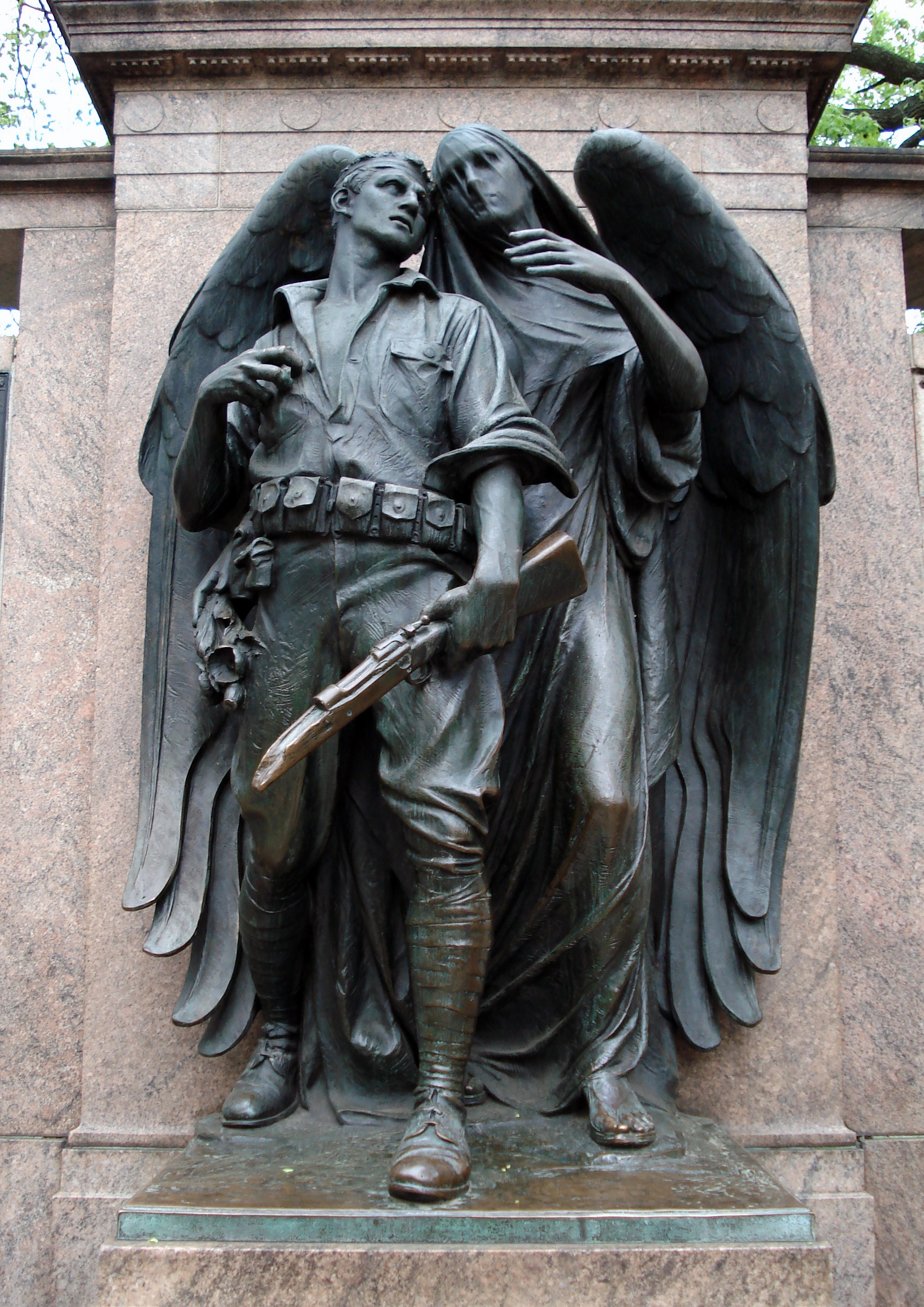
Prospect Park War Memorial, Augustus Lukeman, 1921, in Prospect Park, Brooklyn

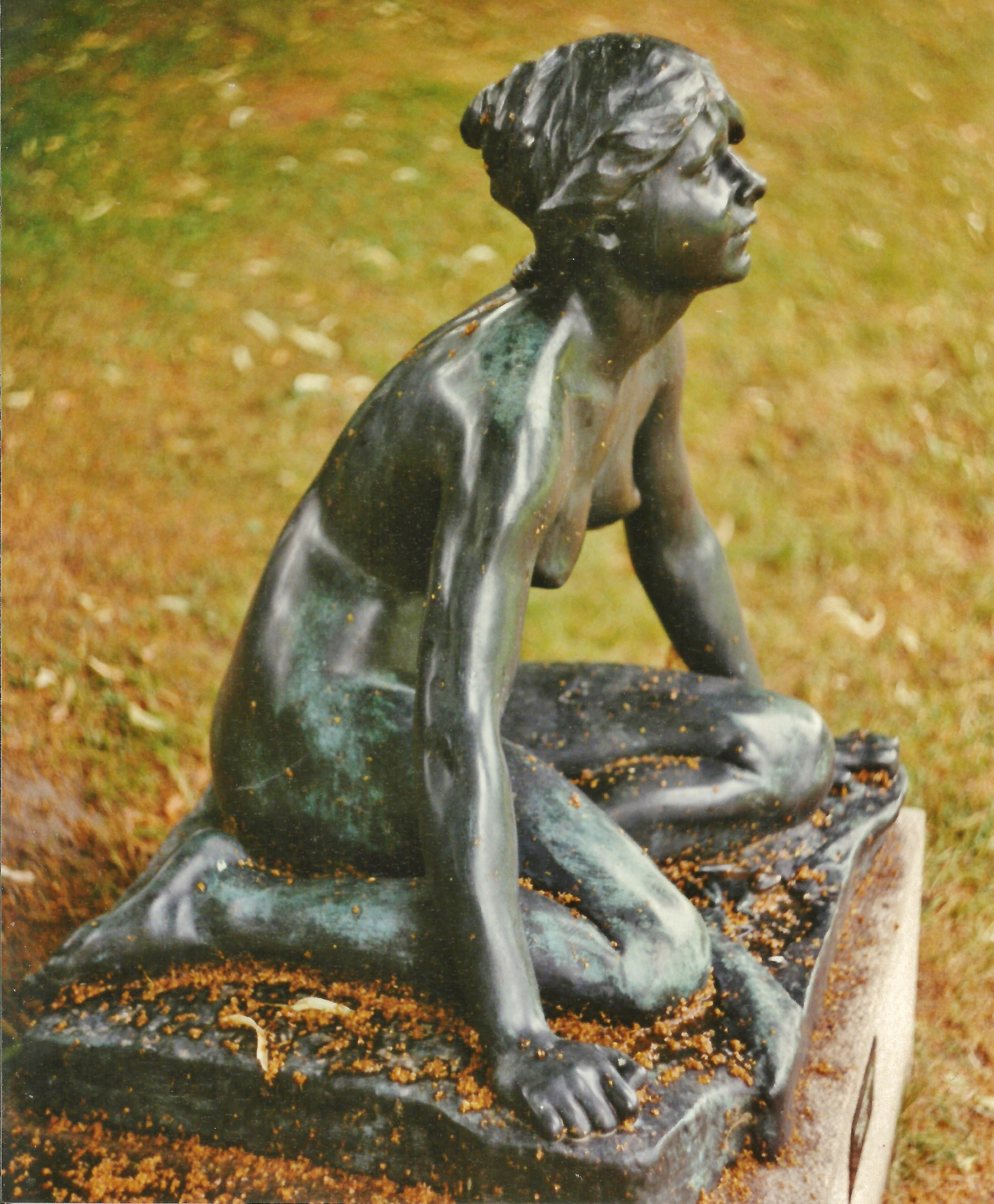
Grodan (The Frog), Paris 1889, by Per Hasselberg. Cast in bronze 1957 for Rottneros Park near Sunne in Värmland, Sweden

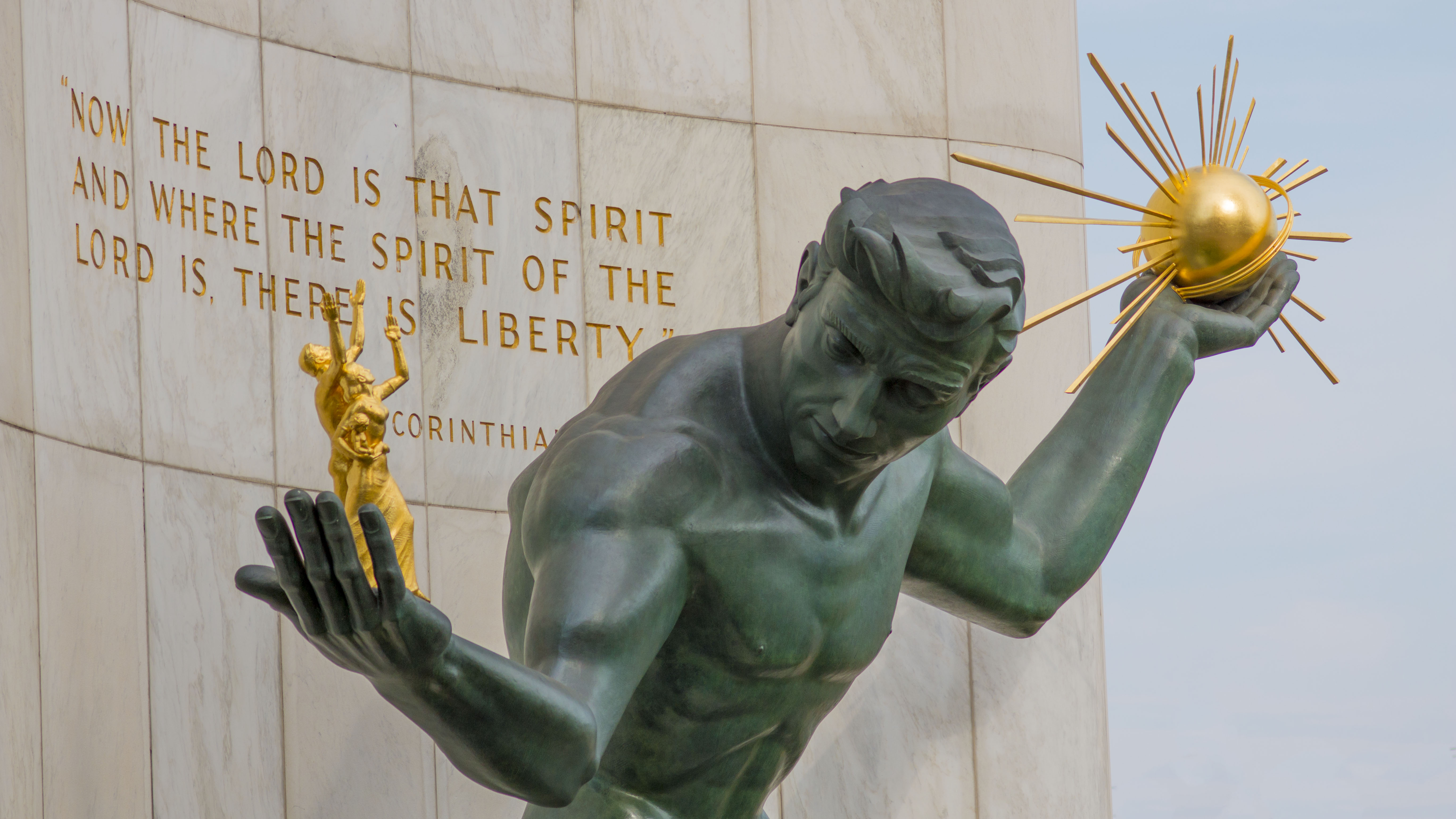
The Spirit of Detroit, Marshall Fredericks, 1958, in Detroit, Michigan, United States

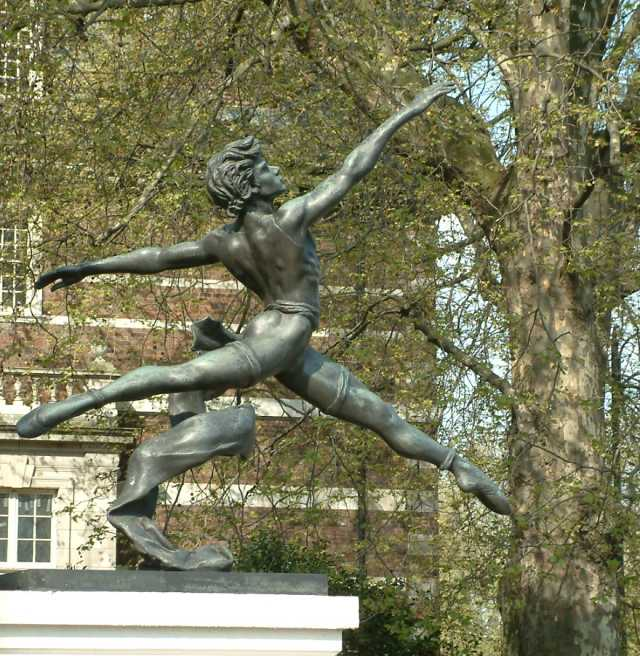
Jeté, Enzo Plazzotta, 1975, at Millbank in Westminster, England, illustrates the material's capabilities

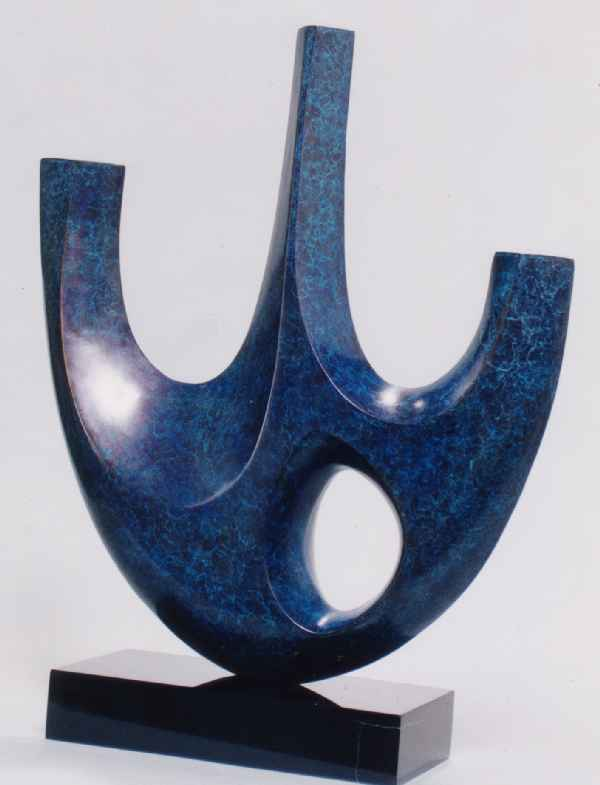
Balance by David Ascalon shows how reactive chemicals applied to the metal create a marbleized blue surface

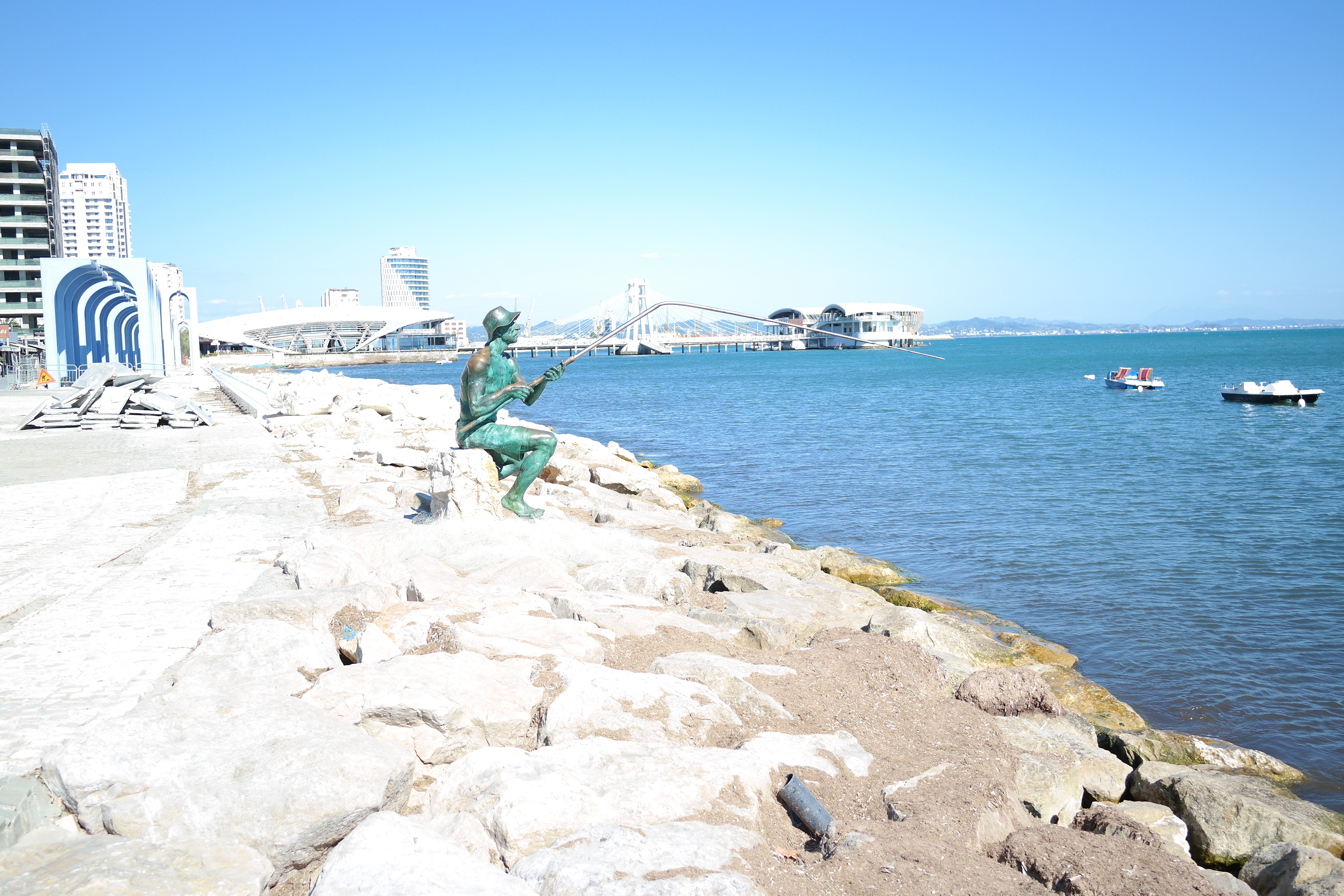
The Fisherman by Dylber Neziri at the Vollga Waterfront in Durrës, Albania.

== See also ==
- Bronze and brass ornamental work

== Bibliography & Further reading ==
- Scholten, Frits (2011). European sculpture and metalwork. New York: The Metropolitan Museum of Art. ISBN 9781588394415.
- Weinryb, Ittai, The Bronze Object in the Middle Ages (Cambridge, 2016).
- Dafas, K. A., 2019. Greek Large-Scale Bronze Statuary: The Late Archaic and Classical Periods, Institute of Classical Studies, School of Advanced Study, University of London, Bulletin of the Institute of Classical Studies, Monograph, BICS Supplement 138 (London).
