= List of protected heritage sites in Mettet =

This table shows an overview of the protected heritage sites in the Walloon municipality Mettet. This list is part of Belgium's national heritage.

Object	Year/architect	Town/section	Address	Coordinates	Number^{?}	Image
Roman aqueduct and the ensemble of the aqueduct and surrounding areas ^{(nl)} ^{(fr)}		Mettet		50.324883°N 4.650957°E	92087-CLT-0001-01 Info	
Church of Saint Martin ^{(nl)} ^{(fr)}		Mettet		50.334551°N 4.607988°E	92087-CLT-0002-01 Info	Kerk Saint Martin
Chapel of Saint-Roch ^{(nl)} ^{(fr)}		Mettet		50.332652°N 4.616793°E	92087-CLT-0003-01 Info	Kapel Saint-Roch
Monastery of Notre-Dame, a former castle (chapel, tower, porch, porch, main entrance, a terrace and a few chimneys) ^{(nl)} ^{(fr)}		Ermeton-sur-Biert	rue de Furnaux, n° 1	50.298987°N 4.717177°E	92087-CLT-0005-01 Info	Klooster Notre-Dame, een voormalig kasteel (kapel, toren, portiek, veranda, de hoofdingang, een terras en een paar schoorstenen)
Church de la Nativité Notre Dame ^{(nl)} ^{(fr)}		Mettet		50.308400°N 4.706270°E	92087-CLT-0007-01 Info	
Castle farm of Bossière ^{(nl)} ^{(fr)}		Mettet	rue de l'Eglise, n°s 2-3	50.338507°N 4.701278°E	92087-CLT-0008-01 Info	
monument ^{(nl)} ^{(fr)}		Mettet		50.345584°N 4.741113°E	92087-CLT-0009-01 Info	
Chapel of Saint-Roch and the ensemble of the chapel and the hill of linden trees ^{(nl)} ^{(fr)}		Mettet		50.346456°N 4.732767°E	92087-CLT-0010-01 Info	
Ensemble of the Chemin des Diligences (chemin communal n ° 10) and the beech trees next to it, and the area bordered in the southeast by the registered land section C n ° 69 E ^{(nl)} ^{(fr)}		Mettet		50.289642°N 4.708814°E	92087-CLT-0011-01 Info	
Parts of Castle Thozée belonging to the family of Felicien Rops ^{(nl)} ^{(fr)}		Mettet		50.333849°N 4.671086°E	92087-CLT-0012-01 Info	Delen van Kasteel van Thozée behorende tot de familie van Félicien Rops
Chapel of Saint-Roch: facades and roofs, and setting of conservation ^{(nl)} ^{(fr)}		Mettet	rue Albert Ier	50.324765°N 4.657417°E	92087-CLT-0013-01 Info	

== See also ==
- List of protected heritage sites in Namur (province)
