= Mettet =

Municipality in Wallonia, Belgium

Mettet: Metet (Walloon)
- Municipality
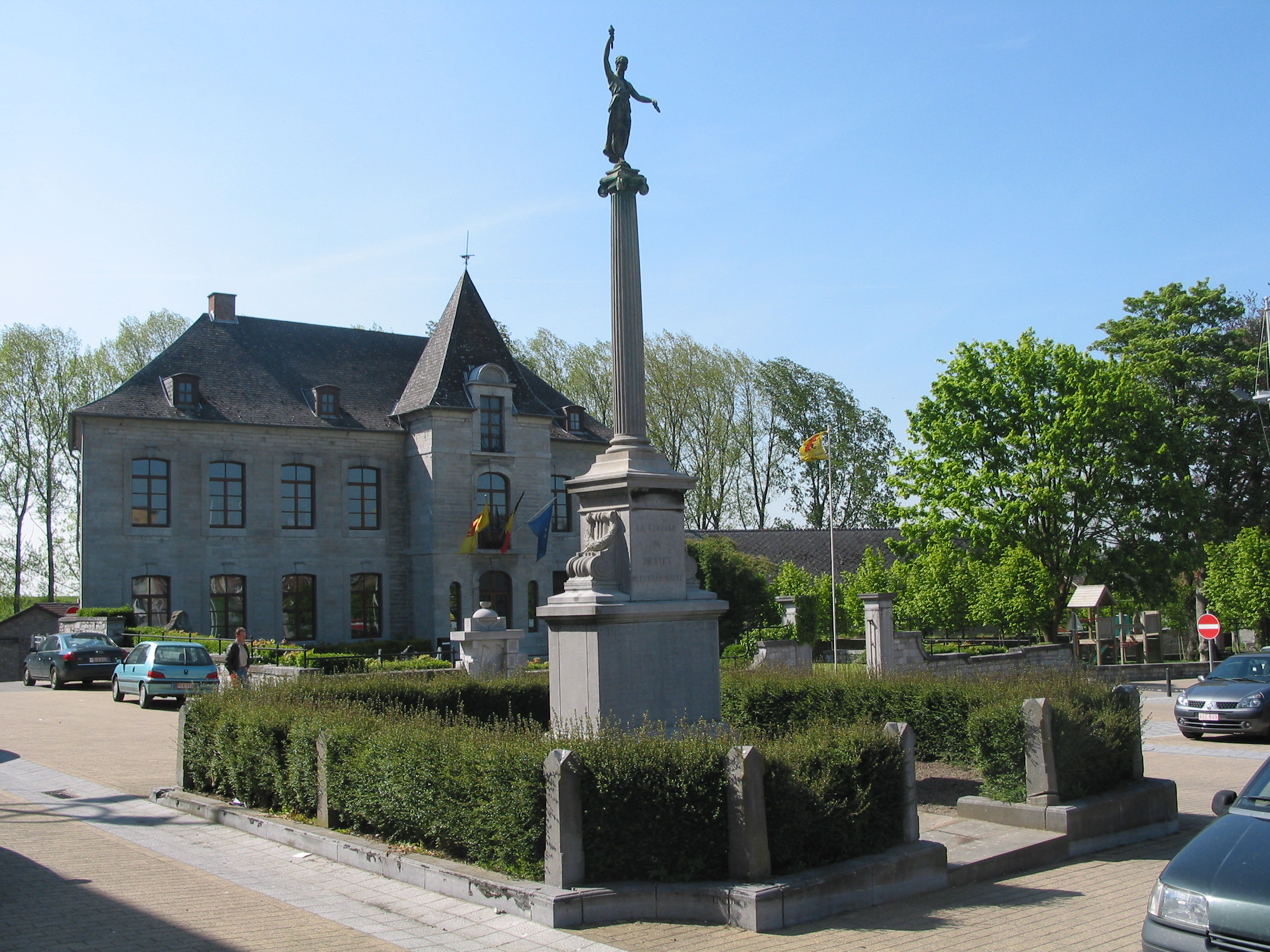
- Mettet town hall

- Flag Coat of arms

- Location of Mettet in Namur Province
- Interactive map of Mettet
- Location in Belgium
- Coordinates: 50°19′N 04°40′E
- Country: Belgium
- Community: French Community
- Region: Wallonia
- Province: Namur
- Arrondissement: Namur

Government
  - Mayor: Yves Delforge
  - Governing party: ICAP-Oxygène-ROPS

Area
  - Total: 116.97 km^{2} (45.16 sq mi)

Population (2018-01-01)
  - Total: 13,037
  - Density: 111.46/km^{2} (288.67/sq mi)
- Postal codes: 5640, 5641, 5644, 5646
- NIS code: 92087
- Area codes: 071
- Website: www.mettet.be

Mettet (French pronunciation: [mɛ.tɛ]; Walloon: Metet) is a municipality of Wallonia located in the province of Namur, Belgium.

On 1 January 2006 Mettet had 11,977 inhabitants. The total area is 116.78 km^{2}, giving a population density of 103 inhabitants per km^{2}.

The municipality consists of the following districts: Biesme, Biesmerée, Ermeton-sur-Biert, Furnaux, Graux, Mettet, Oret, Saint-Gérard, and Stave.

== Circuit Jules Tacheny ==
In Mettet there is a race track, Circuit Jules Tacheny Mettet, for motorbikes and cars.

== Notable people ==
- Alain Crépin (1954–), conductor and musician

== Twin towns ==
- Solofra 2021, Italy

== See also ==
- List of protected heritage sites in Mettet
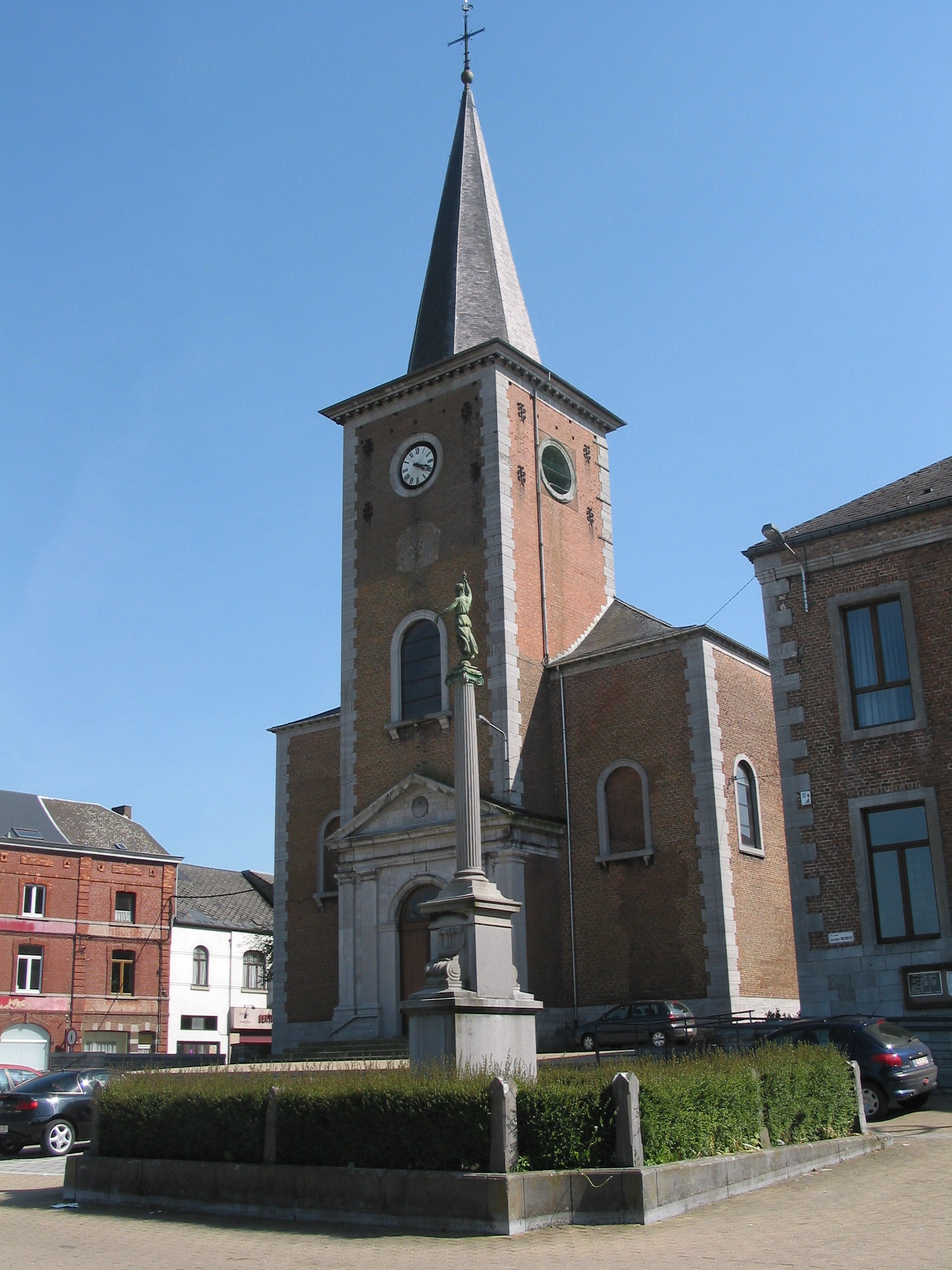
St. John the Baptist church

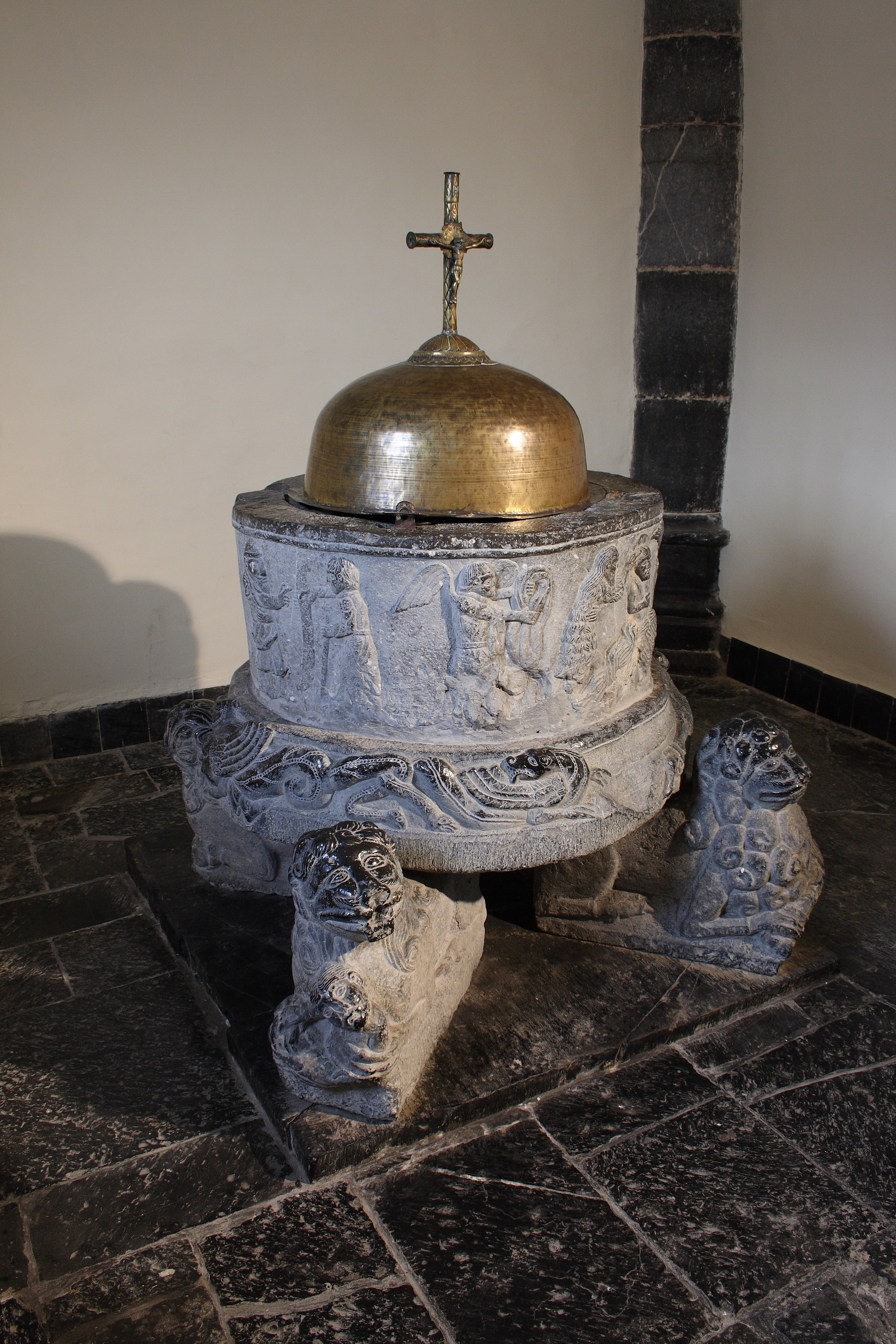
Baptismal font of Furnaux
