= Furnaux =

Furnaux Furnå (Walloon)
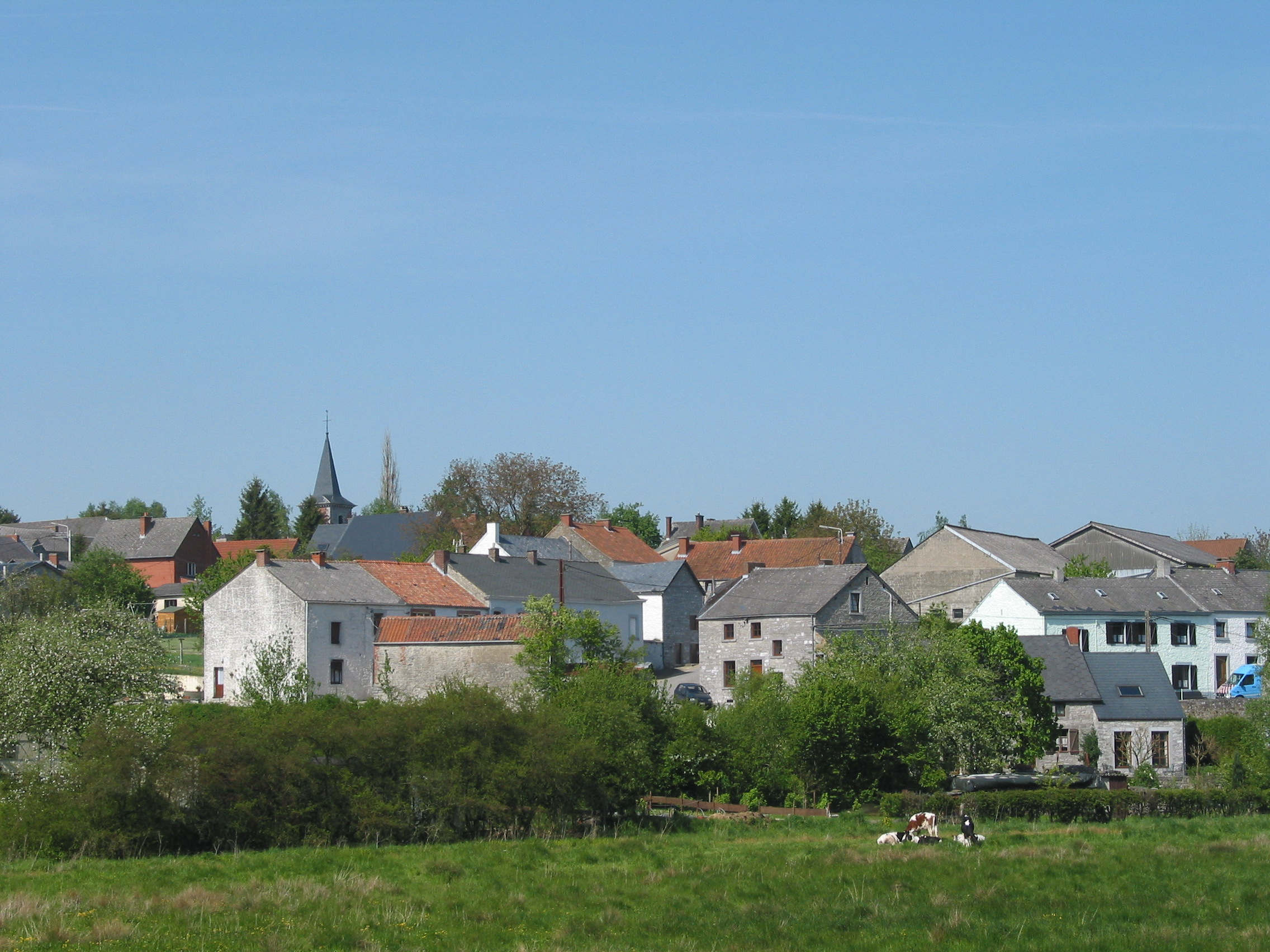
- Furnaux

- Location within Belgium Location within Europe
- Coordinates: 50°18′N 04°42′E
- Country: Belgium
- Region: Wallonia
- Province: Namur
- Municipality: Mettet

Furnaux (French pronunciation: [fyʁno]; Walloon: Furnå) is a village of Wallonia and a district of the municipality of Mettet, located in the province of Namur, Belgium.

The discovery of remains from Roman times in Furnaux indicates that the village has been inhabited since at least the first century AD. The village church is a Gothic building from the 16th century which has been rebuilt frequently during the centuries. It contains unusually well-preserved funerary monuments from the same century, as well as an exceptional baptismal font in Romanesque style from the 12th century, made of black marble from Dinant. There is also a Neoclassical château in the village, dating from the 17th century but rebuilt at the end of the 19th century.
