= God the Father =

Title given to God in various religions

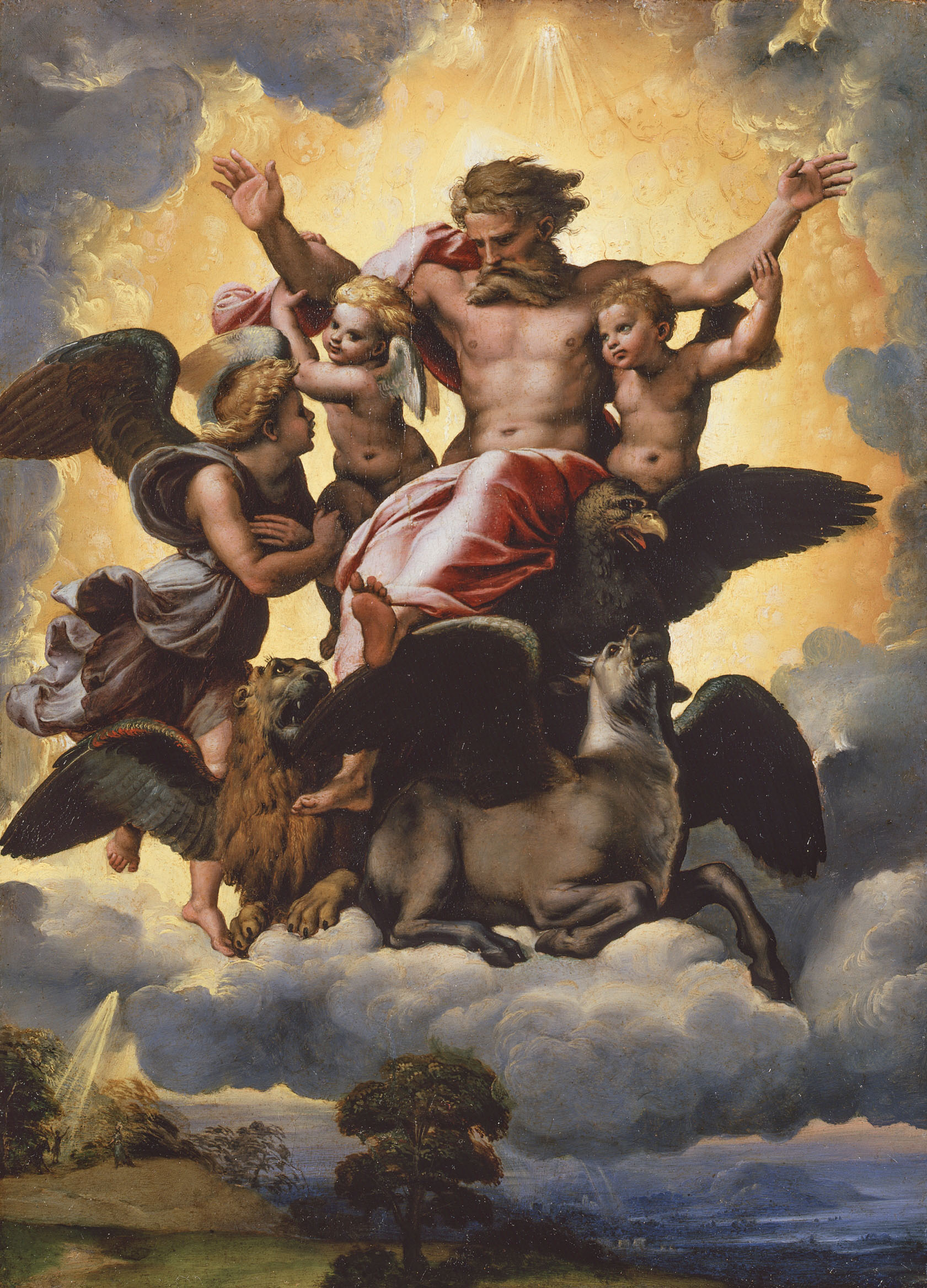
Raphael's c. 1518 painting of Prophet Ezekiel's vision of God the Father in glory

God the Father is a title given to God in Christianity. In mainstream Trinitarian Christianity, God the Father is regarded as the First Person of the Trinity, followed by the Second Person, Jesus Christ the Son, and the Third Person, the Holy Spirit. Since the second century, Christian creeds included affirmation of belief in "God the Father (Almighty)", primarily in his capacity as "Father and creator of the universe". The title carries two senses that Christian teaching holds apart: God as creator and father of all people, and God as father of Jesus in a unique and eternal sense. Although "Father" is grammatically masculine, God is generally held to be spirit without biological sex; the Catechism of the Catholic Church states that God is neither man nor woman.

The fatherhood of God appears in the Old Testament, though not as a major theme, chiefly as a metaphor for God's roles as life-giver, law-giver and protector, and for his covenantal relationship with Israel. It becomes a focus in the New Testament, where Jesus refers to it frequently and addresses God as Abba, the ordinary Aramaic word used within a family. Believers are in turn described as adopted children drawn into the relationship of Father and Son.

Clement of Rome had linked the Father to creation by the end of the first century, and around 213 Tertullian set out a formal account of one divine substance in three Persons. The Nicene Creed of 325 describes the Son as born of the Father before all ages, placing the relationship outside time.

Christians take the concept of God as the father of Jesus Christ metaphysically further than the concept of God as the creator and father of all people, as indicated in the Apostles' Creed where the expression of belief in the "Father almighty, creator of heaven and earth" is immediately, but separately, followed by "and in Jesus Christ, his only Son, our Lord", thus expressing both senses of fatherhood.

For Trinitarians the Father is co-equal, co-eternal and consubstantial with Son and Spirit, not a separate God; Eastern Orthodox theology further treats him as the arche, the origin of both. Nontrinitarian groups generally hold the Father supreme over the Son, among them Jehovah's Witnesses, the Church of Jesus Christ of Latter-day Saints, which understands the Godhead as three distinct beings, and Oneness Pentecostalism, for which Son and Spirit are titles of one person.

Paternal language for God is not confined to Christianity. Judaism uses "Father" as one metaphorical title among many, as in the prayer Avinu Malkeinu; Hinduism and Sikhism likewise address the divine in paternal terms. Islam does not apply the title and rejects any father–son relationship between God and Jesus.

In Western art, the Father went unrepresented in human form for roughly a thousand years, indicated at most by a hand; full anthropomorphic depictions emerged around the tenth century, drawing on the Ancient of Days, and became common by the Renaissance, while remaining rare in Eastern Orthodox art.

== Christianity ==
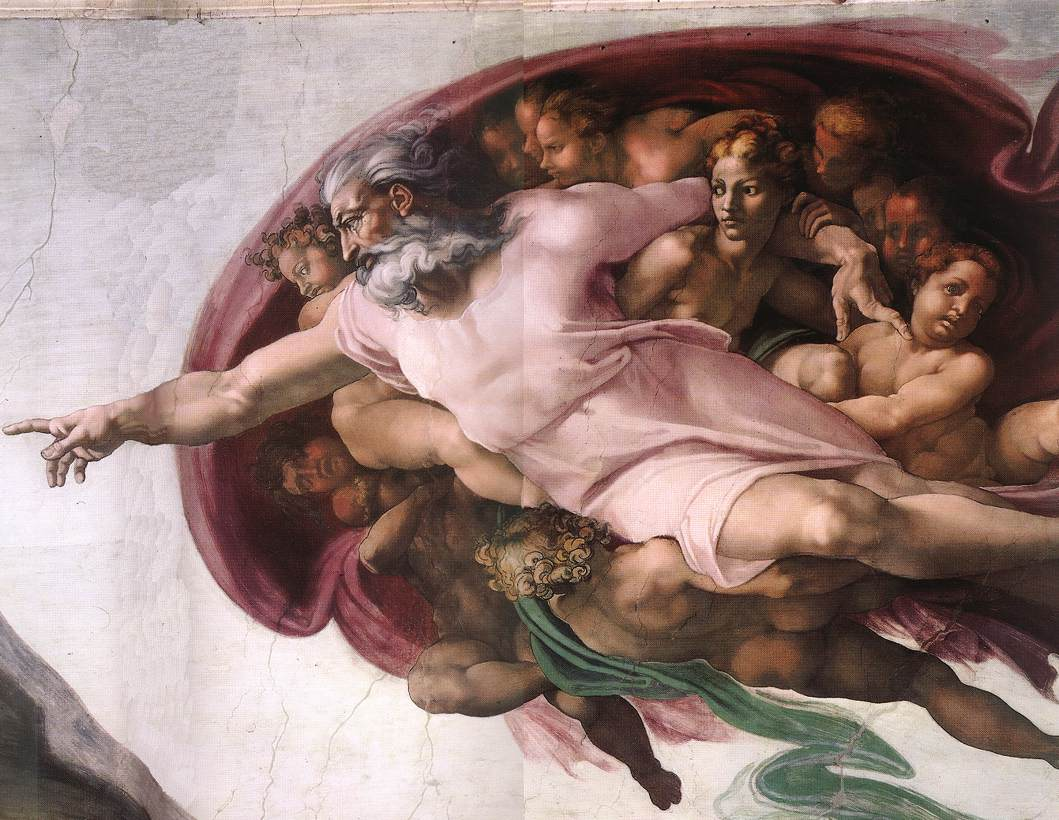
God the Father depicted in The Creation of Adam by Michelangelo, 1510

=== Overview ===
In much of modern Christianity, God is addressed as the Father, in part because of his active interest in human affairs on the earth, in the way that a father would take an interest in his children who are dependent on him and as a father, he will respond to humanity, his children, acting in their best interests. Many believe they can communicate with God and come closer to him through prayer – a key element of achieving communion with God.

In general, the title Father (capitalized) signifies God's role as the life-giver, the authority, and powerful protector, often viewed as immense, omnipotent, omniscient, omnipresent with infinite power and charity that goes beyond human understanding. For instance, after completing his monumental work Summa Theologica, Catholic St. Thomas Aquinas concluded that he had not yet begun to understand "God the Father".

Although the term "Father" implies masculine characteristics, God is usually defined as having the form of a spirit without any human biological gender, e.g. the Catechism of the Catholic Church No. 239 specifically states that "God is neither man nor woman: he is God". Although God is never directly addressed as "Mother", at times motherly attributes may be interpreted in Old Testament references such as hymns of praise Isa 42:14, Isa 49:14–15 or Isa 66:12–13.

In the New Testament, the Christian concept of God the Father may be seen as a continuation of the Jewish concept, but with specific additions and changes, which over time made the Christian concept become even more distinct by the start of the Middle Ages. The conformity to the Old Testament concepts is shown in Matthew 4:10 and Luke 4:8 where in response to temptation Jesus quotes Deuteronomy 6:13 stating: "It is written, you shall worship the Lord your God, and him only shall you serve." 1 Corinthians 8:6 shows the distinct Christian teaching about the agency of Christ by first stating: "there is one God, the Father, of whom are all things, and we unto him" and immediately continuing with "and one Lord, Jesus Christ, through whom are all things, and we through him." This passage acknowledges the Jewish teachings on the uniqueness of God, yet also states the role of Jesus as an agent in creation. Over time, the Christian doctrine began to fully diverge from Judaism through the teachings of the Church Fathers in the second century and by the fourth century belief in the Trinity was formalized.

According to Mary Rose D'Angelo and James Barr, the Aramaic term Abba was in the early times of the New Testament neither markedly a term of endearment, nor a formal word; but the word normally used by sons and daughters, throughout their lives, in the family context.

=== Old Testament ===
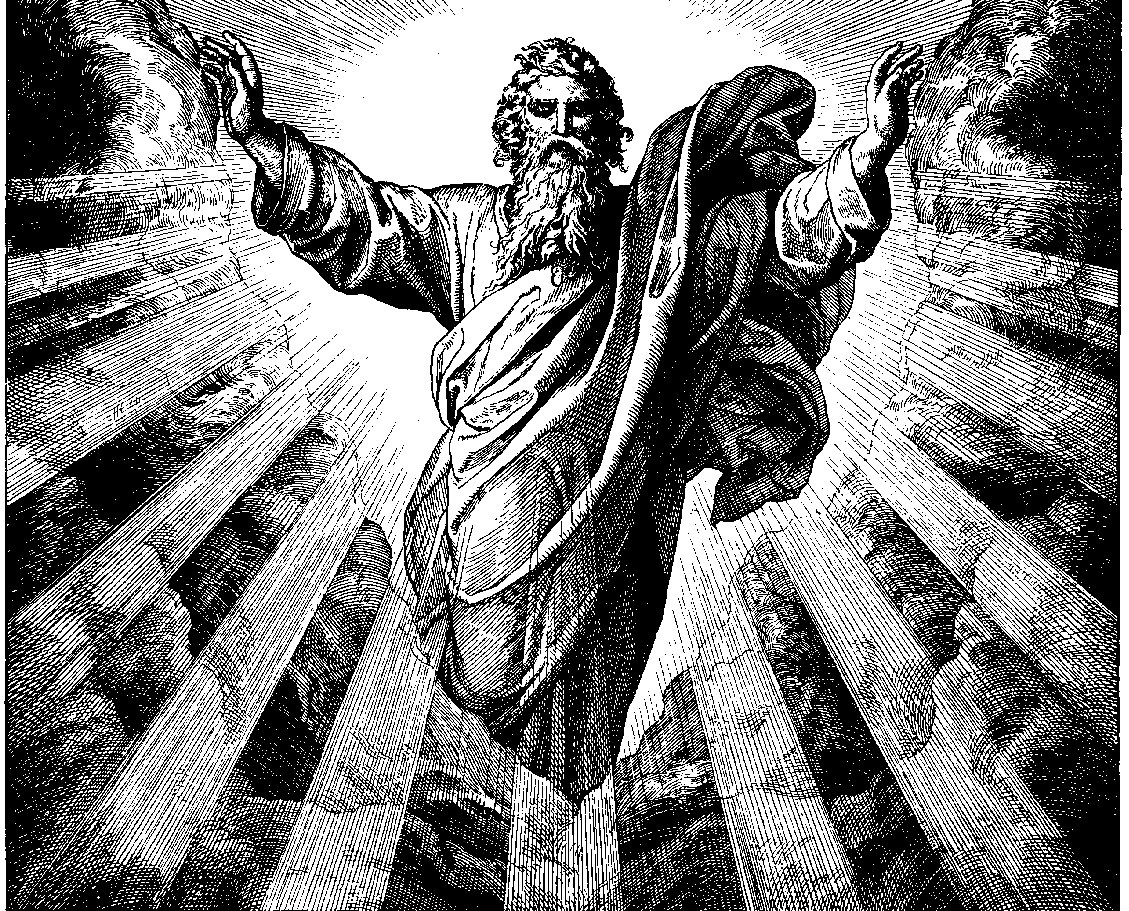
An image of God the Father by Julius Schnorr, 1860

According to Marianne Thompson, in the Old Testament, God is called "Father" with a unique sense of familiarity. In addition to the sense in which God is "Father" to all men because he created the world (and in that sense "fathered" the world), the same God is also uniquely the law-giver to his chosen people. He maintains a special, covenantal father–child relationship with the people, giving them the Shabbat, stewardship of his prophecies, and a unique heritage in the things of God, calling Israel 'my son' because he delivered the descendants of Jacob out of slavery in Egypt according to his covenants and oaths to their fathers, Abraham, Isaac and Jacob. In the Hebrew Bible, Isaiah 63:16 (JP) reads: "For You are our father, for Abraham did not know us, neither did Israel recognize us; You, O [YHWH], are our father; our redeemer of old is your name." To God, according to Judaism, is attributed the fatherly role of protector. He is titled the Father of the poor, of the orphan and the widow, their guarantor of justice. He is also titled the Father of the king, as the teacher and helper over the judge of Israel.

According to Alon Goshen-Gottstein, in the Old Testament, "Father" is generally a metaphor; it is not a proper name for God but rather one of many titles by which Jews speak of and to God. According to Mark Sameth, references to God the Father convulsing in labor, giving birth, and suckling (Deuteronomy 32:13, 18) hint to a priestly belief, noted in the sixteenth and nineteenth centuries by Guillaume Postel and Michelangelo Lanci respectively, that “God the Father” is a dual-gendered deity. In Christianity, fatherhood is taken in a more literal and substantive sense, and is explicit about the need for the Son as a means of accessing the Father, making for a more metaphysical rather than metaphorical interpretation.

=== New Testament ===
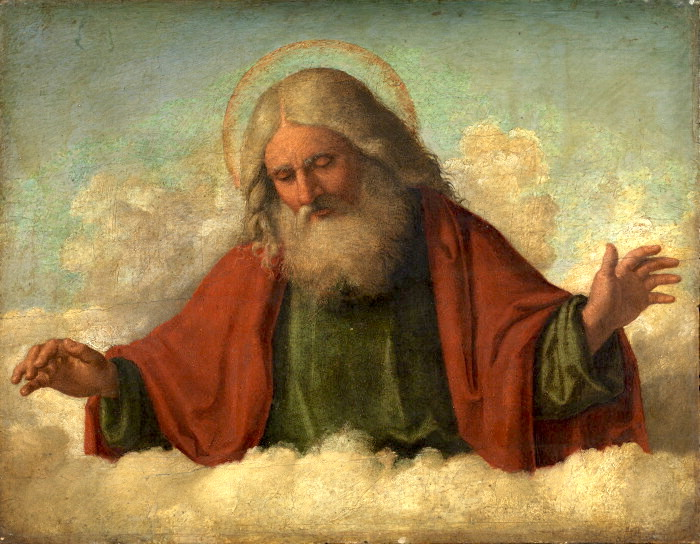
God the Father, Cima da Conegliano, c. 1510–1517

There is a deep sense in which Christians believe that they are made participants in the eternal relationship of Father and Son, through Jesus Christ. Christians call themselves adopted children of God:

But when the fullness of time had come, God sent forth his Son, born of woman, born under the law, to redeem those who were under the law, so that we might receive adoption as sons. And because you are sons, God has sent the Spirit of his Son into our hearts, crying, "Abba! Father!” So you are no longer a slave, but a son, and if a son, then an heir through God.

— Galatians 4:4–7

In Christianity the concept of God as the Father of Jesus is distinct from the concept of God as the creator and Father of all people, as indicated in the Apostles' Creed. The profession in the creed begins with expressing belief in the "Father almighty, creator of heaven and earth" and then immediately, but separately, in "Jesus Christ, his only Son, our Lord", thus expressing both senses of fatherhood within the creed.

=== History ===
Since the second century, creeds in the Western Church have included affirmation of belief in "God the Father (Almighty)", the primary reference being to "God in his capacity as Father and creator of the universe". This did not exclude either the fact the "eternal father of the universe was also the Father of Jesus the Christ" or that he had even "vouchsafed to adopt [the believer] as his son by grace".

Creeds in the Eastern Church (known to have come from a later date) began with an affirmation of faith in "one God" and almost always expanded this by adding "the Father Almighty, Maker of all things visible and invisible" or words to that effect.

By the end of the first century, Clement of Rome had repeatedly referred to the Father, Son and Holy Spirit, and linked the Father to creation, 1 Clement 19.2 stating: "let us look steadfastly to the Father and Creator of the universe". Around AD 213 in Adversus Praxeas (chapter 3), Tertullian is believed to have provided a formal representation of the concept of the Trinity, i.e. that God exists as one "substance" but three 'Persons': The Father, the Son and the Holy Spirit, and with God the Father being the Head. Tertullian also discussed how the Holy Spirit proceeds from the Father and the Son. While the expression "from the Father through the Son" is also found among them. (Note: Tertullian Adversus Praxeas 4 (ANF 3:599–600): "I believe the Spirit to proceed from no other source than from the Father through the Son") (Note: Tertullian Adversus Praxeas 5 (ANF 3:600–601).)

The Nicene Creed, which dates to 325, states that the Son (Jesus Christ) is "born of the Father before all ages", indicating that their divine Father–Son relationship is seen as not tied to an event within time or human history.

=== Trinitarian ===
To Trinitarian Christians (which include Roman Catholics, Eastern Orthodox, Oriental Orthodox, Anglicans, and most but not all Protestant denominations), God the Father is not a separate God from God the Son (of whom Jesus is the incarnation) and the Holy Spirit, the other hypostases of the Christian Godhead. In Eastern Orthodox theology, God the Father is the arche or principium ("beginning"), the "source" or "origin" of both the Son and the Holy Spirit, and is considered the eternal source of the Godhead. The Father is the one who eternally begets the Son, and the Father through the Son eternally breathes the Holy Spirit.

A depiction of the Trinity consisting of God the Father along with God the Son (Jesus) and God the Holy Spirit

As a member of the Trinity, God the Father is one with, co-equal to, co-eternal, and consubstantial with the Son and the Holy Spirit, each Person being the one eternal God and in no way separated: all alike are uncreated and omnipotent. Because of this, the Trinity is beyond reason and can only be known by revelation.

The Trinitarian concept of God the Father is not pantheistic in that he is not viewed as identical to the universe or a vague notion that persists in it, but exists fully outside of creation, as its creator. He is viewed as a loving and caring God, a Heavenly Father who is active both in the world and in people's lives. He created all things visible and invisible in love and wisdom, and created man for his own sake.

The emergence of Trinitarian theology of God the Father in early Christianity was based on two key ideas: first the shared identity of the Yahweh of the Old Testament and the God of Jesus in the New Testament, and then the self-distinction and yet the unity between Jesus and his Father. An example of the unity of Son and Father is Matthew 11:27: "No one knows the Son except the Father and no one knows the Father except the Son", asserting the mutual knowledge of Father and Son.

The concept of fatherhood of God does appear in the Old Testament, but is not a major theme. While the view of God as the Father is used in the Old Testament, it only became a focus in the New Testament, as Jesus frequently referred to it. This is manifested in the Lord's Prayer which combines the earthly needs of daily bread with the reciprocal concept of forgiveness. And Jesus' emphasis on his special relationship with the Father highlights the importance of the distinct yet unified natures of Jesus and the Father, building to the unity of Father and Son in the Trinity.

The paternal view of God as the Father extends beyond Jesus to his disciples, and the entire Church, as reflected in the petitions Jesus submitted to the Father for his followers at the end of the Farewell Discourse, the night before his crucifixion. Instances of this in the Farewell Discourse are John 14:20 as Jesus addresses the disciples: "I am in my Father, and you in me, and I in you" and in John 17:22 as he prays to the Father: "I have given them the glory that you gave me, that they may be one as we are one."

=== Nontrinitarian ===
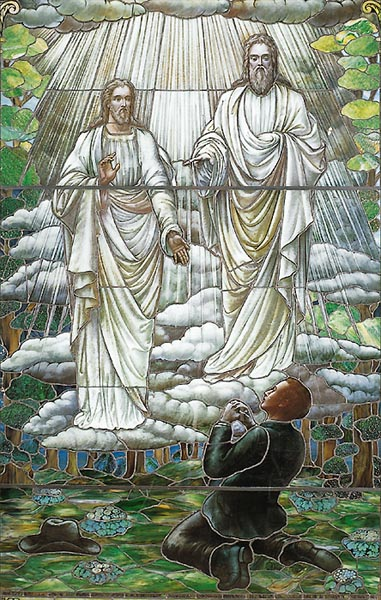
The Church of Jesus Christ of Latter-day Saints' depiction of God the Father and the Son Jesus

A number of Christian groups and communities reject the doctrine of a co-equal Trinity, and generally teach that God the Father is supreme, but nontrinitarian Christian groups differ somewhat from one another in their views regarding God the Father and Christ the Son.

In the Church of Jesus Christ of Latter-day Saints (Commonly known as Mormons or the LDS Church), the most prominent conception of "the Godhead" is as a divine council of three distinct beings: the Father (who is also referred to as Elohim), the Son Jesus (who is identified with Jehovah of the Old Testament), and the Holy Spirit. The Father and Son are considered to have perfected, physical bodies, while the Holy Spirit has a body of spirit. LDS Church members believe God the Father presides over both the Son and Holy Spirit, where God the Father is greater than both, but they are one in the sense that they have a unity of purpose. Most denominations in the Latter Day Saint movement also believe God (often referred to as Heavenly Father) has at least one spouse referred to as Heavenly Mother, and together they are called Heavenly Parents.

The Assemblies of Yahweh are nontrinitarian, believing that the Father is greater than the Son in all things, and that the Holy Spirit is not equal to the Father, and is not an actual person, but is God's "power" or "character" in action. They refer to God the Father as "Yahweh". The Yahweh Assemblies and other Sacred Name groups generally teach that Christ the Son was God's first and prime creation, and was used to create everything else. They believe that the Messiah, whom they call "Yahshua" or "Yeshua" or "Yehoshua", died for man's sins, and is to be honored as the Anointed Lord, but that God the Father (Yahweh) is the True God that all "true worshippers" ultimately serve and worship. They teach that the Father is the only eternal one.

In Jehovah's Witness theology, only God the Father (Jehovah) is the one true almighty God, even over his Son Jesus Christ. They teach that the Logos is God's Only-begotten Son, and that the Holy Spirit is God's active force (projected energy). They believe that the Father and the Son are united in divine purpose, administration, legislation, and man's salvation, but are not one being and are not equal in power. While the Witnesses acknowledge Jesus’ pre-existence, perfection, and unique "Sonship" from God the Father, and believe that the Logos had an essential role in creation and redemption, and is the Messiah, they believe that only the Father is without beginning. They say that the Son was the Father's only direct creation, before all ages. While both Persons are highly honored, taught, and preached, in their interpretations of John 17:3 and John 14:28, God the Father is emphasized in Jehovah's Witness meetings and services more than Christ the Son, as they teach that the Father is greater than the Son.

Oneness Pentecostalism teaches that God is a singular spirit who is one person, not three divine persons, individuals or minds. God the Father is the title of the supreme creator. The titles of the Son and Holy Spirit are merely titles reflecting the different personal manifestations of the One True God the Father in the universe.

== Other religions ==
Although similarities exist among religions, the common language and the shared concepts about God and his title Father among the Abrahamic religions is limited and each religion has specific belief structures and religious nomenclature with respect to the subject. While a religious teacher in one faith may be able to explain the concepts to his own audience with ease, significant barriers remain in communicating those concepts across religious boundaries.

=== Greco-Romanism ===
Greco-Roman pagans believed in an original triad. Over time, the names and gods of the triad were changed—except for Jupiter, which means "Father Jove" and comes from Proto-Italic Djous Patēr, from Djous (“day, sky”) + Patēr (“father”), from Proto-Indo-European Dyḗws (literally “the bright one”), root nomen agentis from Dyew- (“to be bright, day sky”), and Ph₂tḗr (“father”).

=== God Worshipping Society ===
A syncretic sect created by Hong Xiuquan, founder of the Taiping Heavenly Kingdom, that mixed Protestantism and Chinese folk religion, the objective of this sect was to overthrow the Manchus and restore power to the Han. God consisted of a triad made up of Shangdi (the Supreme Emperor in ancient Chinese worship), Christ as the eldest son and Hong as the youngest son.

=== Hinduism ===
In Hinduism, Bhagavan Krishna in the Bhagavad Gita, chapter 9, verse 17, stated: "I am the Father of this world, the Mother, the Dispenser and the Grandfather", one commentator adding: "God being the source of the universe and the beings in it, He is held as the Father, the Mother and the Grandfather". A genderless Brahman is also considered the creator and Life-giver, and the Shakta goddess is viewed as the divine mother and life-bearer.

=== Islam ===
Unlike in Judaism, the term "father" is not formally applied to God by Muslims, and the Christian notion of the Trinity is rejected in Islam. Even though traditional Islamic teaching does not formally prohibit using the term "Father" in reference to God, it does not propagate or encourage it. There are some narratives of the Islamic prophet Muhammad in which he compares the mercy of God toward his worshipers to that of a mother to her infant child.

Islamic teaching rejects the Christian father-son relationship of God and Jesus, and states that Jesus is a prophet of God, not the Son of God. Islamic theology strictly reiterates the Absolute Oneness of God, and totally separates him from other beings (whether humans, angel or any other holy figure), and rejects any form of dualism or Trinitarianism. Chapter 112 of the Quran states:

Say, ˹O Prophet,˺ “He is God—One ˹and Indivisible˺; God—the Sustainer ˹needed by all˺. He has never had offspring, nor was He born. And there is none comparable to Him.”

— Surah Al-Ikhlas 112:1–4

=== Judaism ===
In Judaism, the use of the "Father" title is generally a metaphor, referring to the role as Life-giver and Law-giver, and is one of many titles by which Jews speak of and to God. The Jewish concept of God is that God is non-corporeal, transcendent and immanent, the ultimate source of love, and a metaphorical "Father"

The Aramaic term for father (Hebrew: אבא, abba) appears in traditional Jewish liturgy and Jewish prayers to God (e.g. in the Kaddish).

According to Ariela Pelaia, in a prayer of Rosh Hashanah, Areshet Sfateinu, an ambivalent attitude toward God is demonstrated, due to his role as a father and as a king. Free translation of the relevant sentence may be: "today every creature is judged, either as sons or as slaves. If as sons, forgive us like a father forgives his son. If as slaves, we wait, hoping for good, until the verdict, your holy majesty." Another famous prayer emphasizing this dichotomy is called Avinu Malkeinu, which means "Our Father Our King" in Hebrew. Usually the entire congregation will sing the last verse of this prayer in unison, which says: "Our Father, our King, answer us as though we have no deed to plead our cause, save us with mercy and loving-kindness."

=== Sikhism ===
The Guru Granth consistently refers to the creator as "He" and "Father". This is because the Granth is written in north Indian Indo-Aryan languages (mixture of Punjabi and dialects of Hindi) which have no neutral gender. Since the Granth says that the God is indescribable, God has no gender according to Sikhism.

God in the Sikh scriptures has been referred to by several names, picked from Indian and Semitic traditions. He is called in terms of human relations as father, mother, brother, relation, friend, lover, beloved, husband. Other names, expressive of his supremacy, are thakur, prabhu, svami, sah, patsah, sahib, sain (Lord, Master).

== In Western art ==
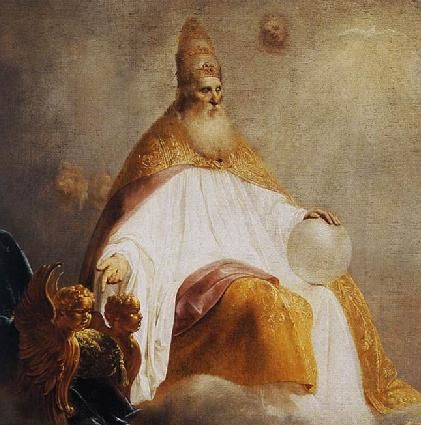
Depiction of God the Father (detail), Pieter de Grebber, 1654

For about a thousand years, no attempt was made to portray God the Father in human form, because early Christians believed that the words of Exodus 33:20, "Thou canst not see my face: for there shall no man see Me and live" and of the Gospel of John 1:18, "No man hath seen God at any time" were meant to apply not only to the Father, but to all attempts at the depiction of the Father. Typically only a small part of the body of Father would be represented, usually the hand, or sometimes the face, but rarely the whole person, and in many images, the figure of the Son supplants the Father, so a smaller portion of the person of the Father is depicted.

In the early medieval period God was often represented by Christ as the Logos, which continued to be common even after the separate figure of God the Father appeared. Western art eventually required some way to illustrate the presence of the Father, so through successive representations a set of artistic styles for the depiction of the Father in human form gradually emerged around the tenth century AD.

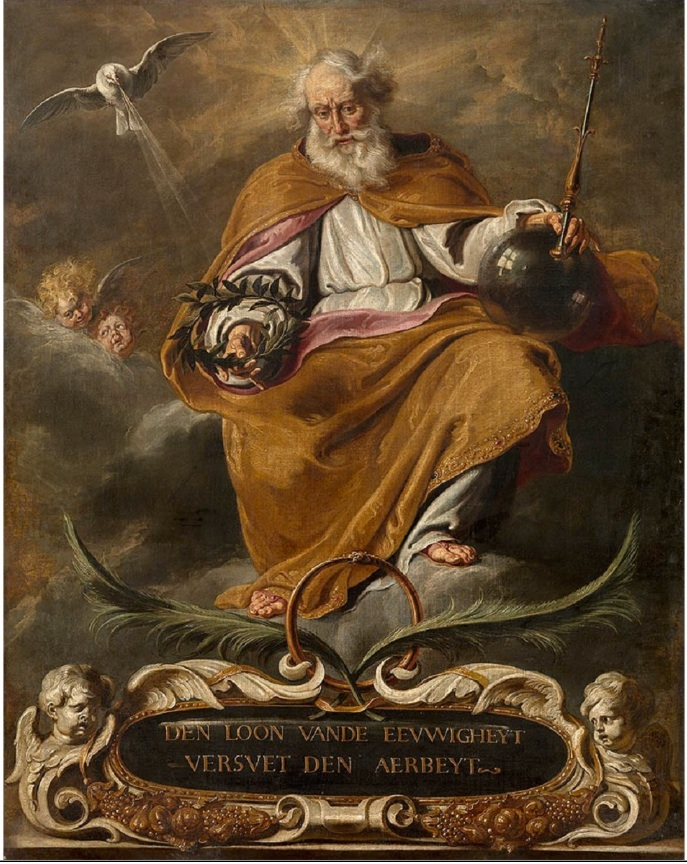
God the Father, Jacob Herreyns the Elder, 18th century

By the twelfth century, depictions of a figure of God the Father, essentially based on the Ancient of Days in the Book of Daniel had started to appear in French manuscripts and in stained glass church windows in England. In the 14th century the illustrated Naples Bible had a depiction of God the Father in the Burning bush. By the 15th century, the Rohan Book of Hours included depictions of God the Father in human form or anthropomorphic imagery. Though the depiction remains rare and often controversial in Eastern Orthodox art, by the time of the Renaissance artistic representations of God the Father were freely used in the Western Church.

== See also ==
- Ancient of Days
- Divine filiation
- Father Time
- God Alone
- Eugenia Ravasio
- Sabellianism
- Sky father
