= God in Christianity =

Christian conception of God

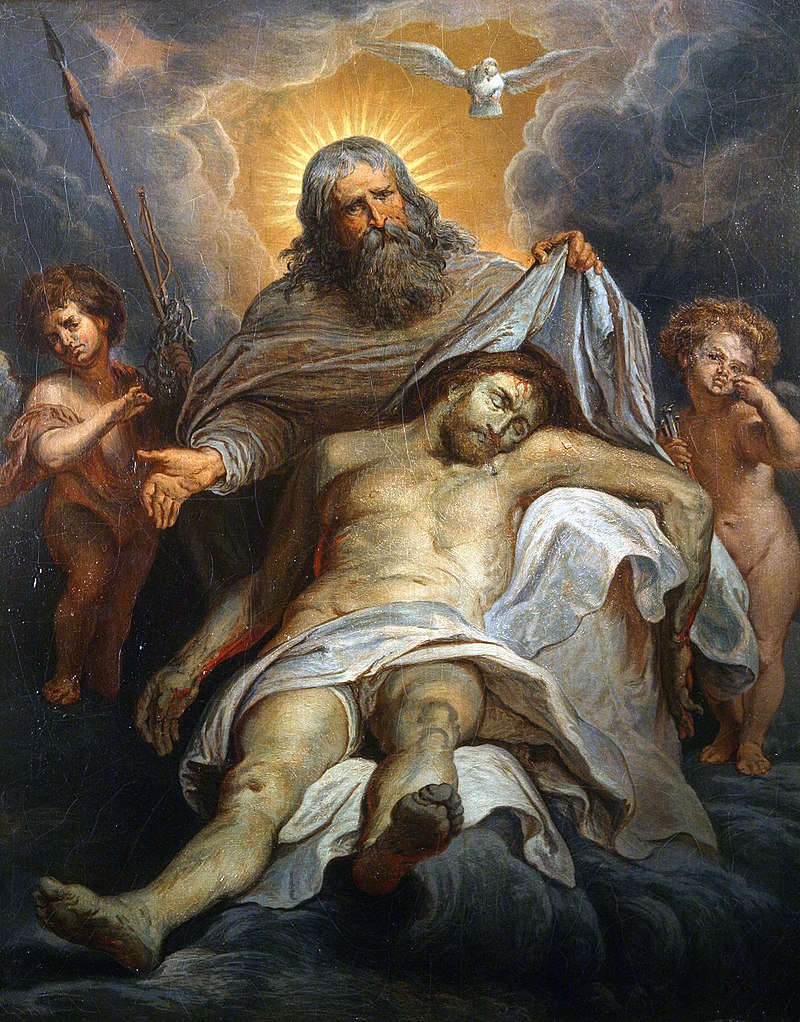
La Sainte Trinité, painting by Gustave Doré (1866). God the Father presents the body of Christ, his Divine Son, with the Holy Spirit visible as a dove at the top of the image.

In Christianity, God (also referred to as Yahweh, Jehovah, or the Lord) (Note: Yahweh and Jehovah are two ways of rendering the divine name YHWH (the Tetragrammaton), with "Jehovah" resulting from pairing its consonants with the vowels of Adonai, a Hebrew title commonly translated into English with small caps as "the LORD".) is the eternal, supreme deity who created and preserves all things. Christians believe in a monotheistic conception of God, which is both transcendent (wholly independent of, and removed from, the material universe) and immanent (involved in the material universe). Most Christians believe in a singular God that exists in a Trinity, which consists of three Persons: God the Father, God the Son (Jesus), and God the Holy Spirit. Some Christian teachings on the transcendence, immanence, and involvement of God in the world and his love for humanity exclude the belief that God is of the same substance as the created universe (that is, rejection of pantheism) but accept that God the Son assumed hypostatically united human nature, thus becoming man in a unique event known as "the Incarnation".

Early Christian views of God were expressed in the Pauline epistles and the early Christian creeds, which proclaimed one God and the divinity of Jesus. (Note: One example is 1 Corinthians 8:5-6: "For even if there are so-called gods, whether in heaven or on earth (as indeed there are many 'gods' and many 'lords'), yet for us there is but one God, the Father, from whom all things came and for whom we live; and there is but one Lord, Jesus Christ, through whom all things came and through whom we live.") Although some early sects of Christianity, such as the Jewish-Christian Ebionites, protested against the deification of Jesus, the concept of Jesus being one with God was accepted by the majority of Gentile Christians. This formed one aspect of the split of early Christianity and Judaism, as Gentile Christian views of God began to diverge from the traditional Jewish teachings of the time.

The theology of the attributes and nature of God has been discussed since the earliest days of Christianity, with Irenaeus writing in the 2nd century: "His greatness lacks nothing, but contains all things". In the 8th century, John of Damascus listed eighteen attributes which remain widely accepted. As time passed, Christian theologians developed systematic lists of these attributes, some based on statements in the Bible (e.g., the Lord's Prayer, stating that the Father is in Heaven), others based on theological reasoning. The "Kingdom of God" is a prominent phrase in the synoptic Gospels, and while there is near unanimous agreement among scholars that it represents a key element of the teachings of Jesus, there is little scholarly agreement on its exact interpretation.

Although the New Testament does not have a formal doctrine of the Trinity as such, "it does repeatedly speak of the Father, the Son, and the Holy Spirit... in such a way as to compel a Trinitarian understanding of God". Around 200 AD, Tertullian formulated a version of the doctrine of the Trinity which clearly affirmed the divinity of Jesus. This concept was later expanded upon at the First Council of Nicaea in 325 AD, and a later definitive form was produced by the Ecumenical Council of 381. The Trinitarian doctrine holds that God the Son, God the Father, and God the Holy Spirit are all different hypostases (Persons) of one substance, and is not traditionally held to be one of tritheism. Trinitarianism was subsequently adopted as the official theological doctrine through Nicene Christianity thereafter, and forms a cornerstone of modern Christian understandings of God—however, a small number of Christian denominations hold nontrinitarian views about God.

== Background ==
Christians, in common with Jews and Muslims, identify with the biblical patriarch Abraham to whom God revealed himself. It is believed that Abraham was the first to affirm monotheism (the belief in one God) and had an ideal relationship with God. The Abrahamic religions believe that God continuously interacted with the descendants of Abraham over millennia; both Christians and Jews believe that this covenant is recorded in the Hebrew Bible, which most Christian denominations consider to be (and refer to as) the Old Testament. In the traditional interpretations of Christianity, God is always referred to with masculine grammatical articles only.

== Development of the conception of God ==
=== Overview ===
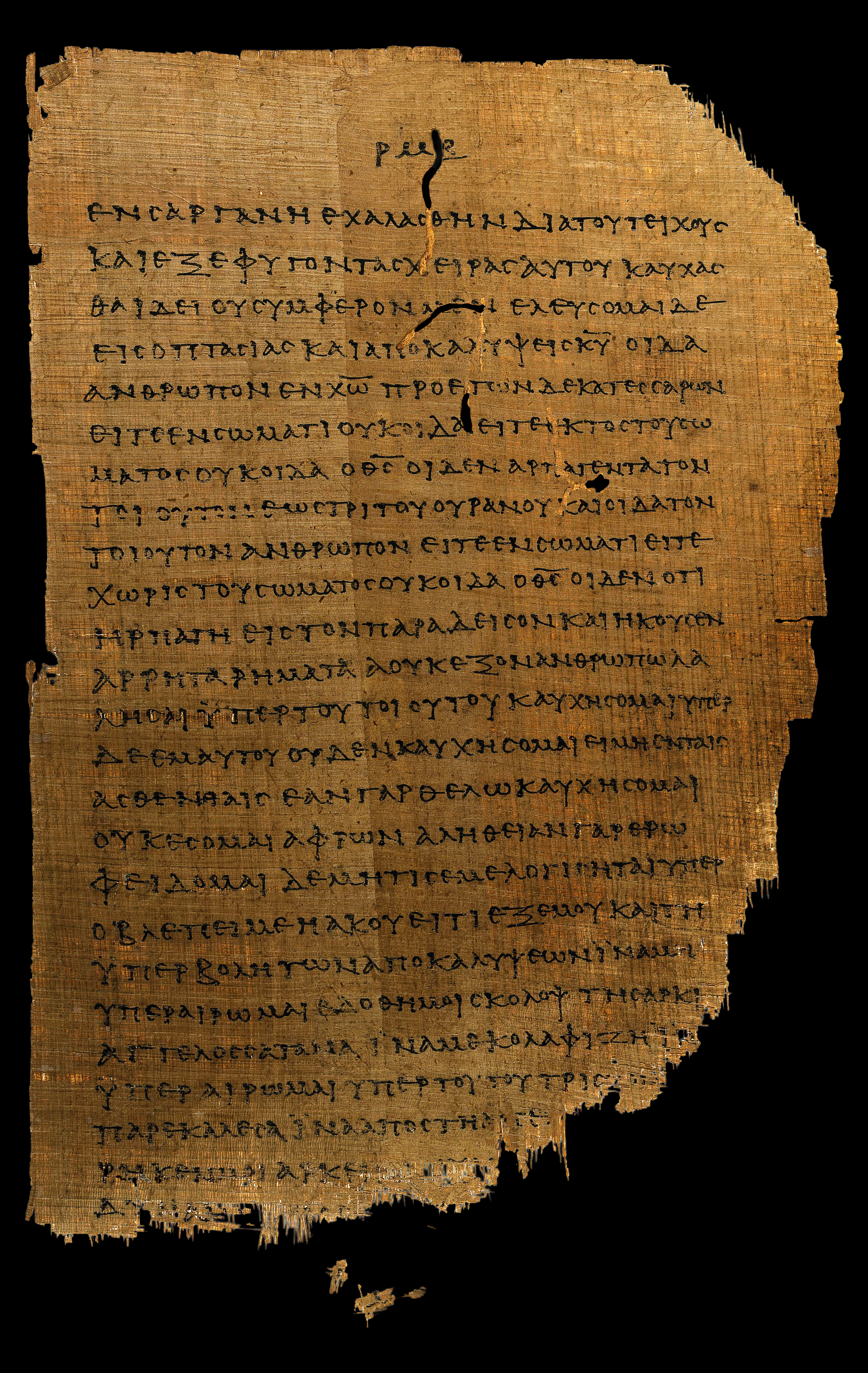
A folio from Papyrus 46 containing a copy of 2 Corinthians 11:33–12:9. This folio dates to between 175 and 225 AD.

Early Christian views of God (before the gospels were written) are reflected in the Apostle Paul's statement in 1 Corinthians 8:5–6, written c. AD 53–54, about twenty years after the crucifixion of Jesus, and 12–21 years before the earliest of the canonical gospels was written:

...for us there is but one God, the Father, from whom all things came and for whom we live; and there is but one Lord, Jesus Christ, through whom all things came and through whom we live.

Apart from asserting that there is one God, Paul's statement (which is likely based on pre-Pauline confessions) includes a number of other significant elements: he distinguishes Christian belief from the Jewish background of the time by referring to Jesus and the Father almost in the same breath, and by conferring on Jesus the title of divine honor "Lord", as well as calling him Christ. In the Book of Acts (Acts 17:24–27), during the Areopagus sermon given by Paul, he further characterizes the early Christian understanding:

The God that made the world and all things therein, he, being Lord of heaven and earth

Paul also reflects on the relationship between God and Christians:

...that they should seek God, if haply they might feel after him and find him, though he is not far from each one of us for in him we live.

The Pauline epistles also include a number of references to the Holy Spirit, with the theme which appears in 1 Thessalonians 4:8 – "...God, the very God who gives you his Holy Spirit" – appearing throughout his epistles. In John 14:26, Jesus also refers to "the Holy Spirit, whom the Father will send in my name".

By the end of the 1st century, Clement of Rome had repeatedly referred to the Father, Son, and Holy Spirit, and linked the Father to creation in 1 Clement 19.2, stating: "let us look steadfastly to the Father and creator of the universe". By the middle of the 2nd century, in Against Heresies, Irenaeus had emphasized (in Book 4, chapter 5) that the Creator is the "one and only God" and the "maker of heaven and earth". These preceded the formal presentation of the concept of Trinity by Tertullian early in the 3rd century.

The period from the late 2nd century to the beginning of the 4th century (approximately 180–313) is generally called the "epoch of the Great Church" and also the Ante-Nicene Period, and witnessed significant theological development, and the consolidation and formalization of a number of Christian teachings.

From the 2nd century onward, western creeds started with an affirmation of belief in "God the Father (Almighty)" and the primary reference of this phrase was to "God in his capacity as Father and creator of the universe". This did not exclude either the fact the "eternal father of the universe was also the Father of Jesus the Christ" or that he had even "vouchsafed to adopt [the believer] as his son by grace". Eastern creeds (those known to have come from a later date) began with an affirmation of faith in "one God" and almost always expanded this by adding "the Father Almighty, Maker of all things visible and invisible" or words to that effect.

Augustine of Hippo, Thomas Aquinas, and other Christian theologians have described God with the Latin term ipsum esse, a phrase that translates roughly to "being itself". God's aseity makes the Christian God not "a being" but rather "being itself", and can be explained by phrases such as "that which is with no reliance on anything external for its being" or "the necessary condition for anything to exist at all".

As time passed, theologians and philosophers developed more precise understandings of the nature of God and began to produce systematic lists of his attributes. These varied in detail, but traditionally the attributes fell into two groups: those based on negation (that God is impassible) and those positively based on eminence (that God is infinitely good). Ian Ramsey suggested that there are three groups, and that some attributes, such as simplicity and perfection, have a different logical dynamic which from such attributes as infinite goodness since there are relative forms of the latter but not of the former.

=== Name ===
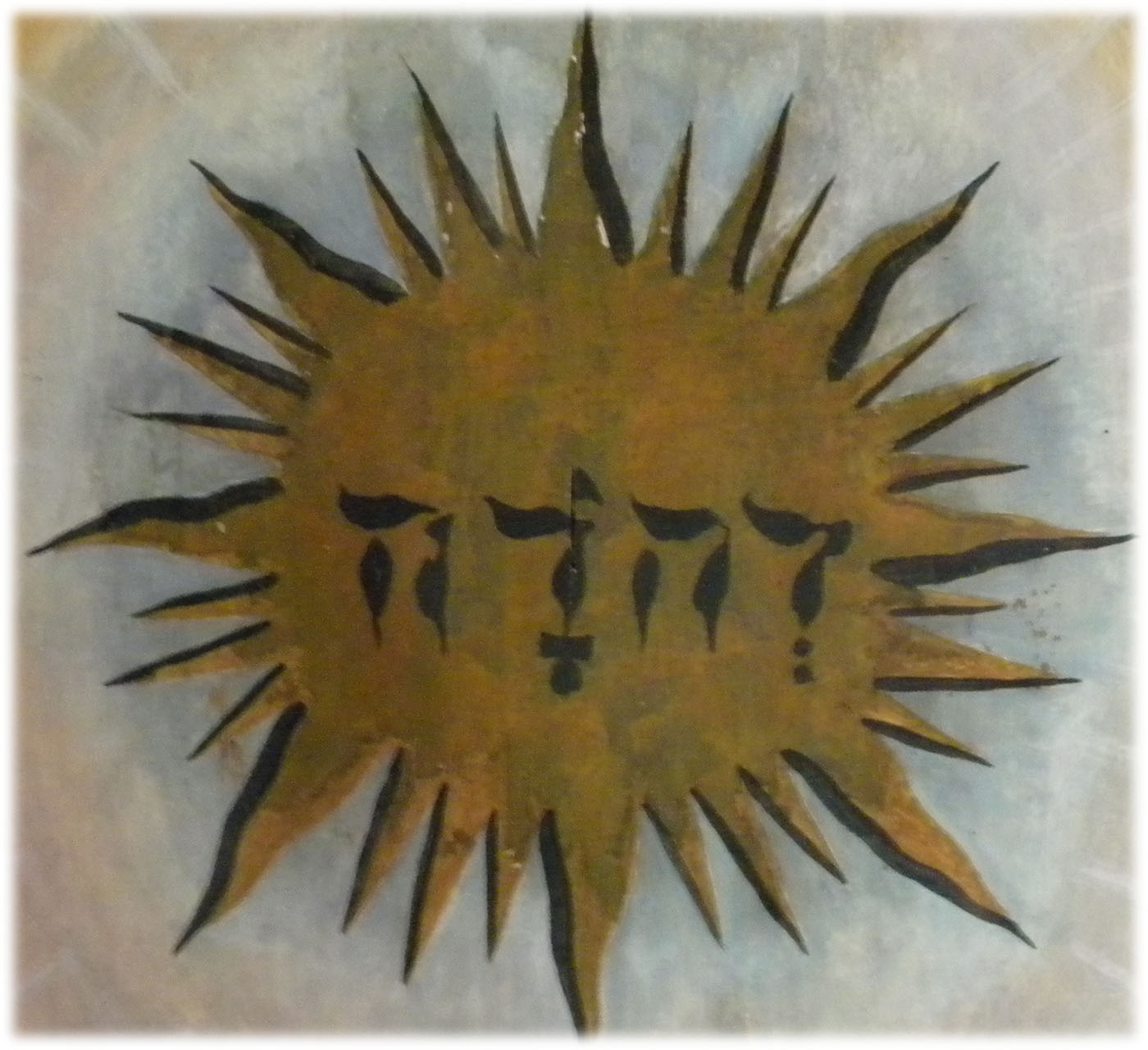
The Tetragrammaton YHWH, the name of God written in Hebrew, old church of Ragunda, Sweden

In Christian theology, the name of God has always held deeper significance than purely being a label, considered instead to have divine origin and be based upon divine revelation. The Bible usually uses the name of God in the singular (e.g., Exodus 20:7 or Psalms 8:1), generally using the terms in a very general sense rather than referring to any special designation of God. However, general references to the name of God may branch to other special forms which express his multifaceted attributes. The Old Testament reveals YHWH (often vocalized with vowels as "Yahweh" or "Jehovah") as the personal name of God, along with certain titles including El Elyon and El Shaddai. When reading the Hebrew Bible aloud, Jews replace the Tetragrammaton with the title Adonai, translated as Kyrios in the Septuagint and the Greek New Testament. Jah (or Yah) is an abbreviation of Jahweh/Yahweh/Jehovah. It is often used by Christians in the interjection "Hallelujah", meaning "Praise Jah", which is used to give God glory. In the New Testament, Theos and Pater (πατήρ, "father" in Greek) are additional words used to reference God.

Respect for the name of God is one of the Ten Commandments, which is viewed not only as an avoidance of the improper use of the name of God, but also a commandment to exalt it, through both pious deeds and praise. This is reflected in the first petition in the Lord's Prayer addressed to God the Father: "Hallowed be thy Name".

In the theology of the Early Church Fathers, the name of God was seen as representative of the entire system of "divine truth" revealed to the faithful "that believe in his name" or "walk in the name of the Lord our God" In Revelation 3:12, those who bear the name of God are "destined for Heaven". John 17:6 presents the teachings of Jesus as the manifestation of the name of God to his disciples.

John 12:27 presents the sacrifice of Jesus the Lamb of God, and the ensuing salvation delivered through it as the glorification of the name of God, with the voice from Heaven confirming Jesus' petition ("Father, glorify thy name") by saying: "I have both glorified it, and will glorify it again", referring to the Baptism and crucifixion of Jesus.

Other theologians (Pseudo-Dionysius the Areopagite, Thomas Aquinas, etc.) state that God has no name. Justin Martyr stated both that God has no name, and that God's name is Jesus.

=== Attributes and nature ===
The theological underpinnings of the attributes and nature of God have been discussed since the earliest days of Christianity. In the 2nd century, Irenaeus addressed the issue and expounded on some attributes; for example, Book IV, chapter 19 of Against Heresies states: "His greatness lacks nothing, but contains all things". Irenaeus based his attributes on three sources: Scripture, prevailing mysticism and popular piety. Today, some of the attributes associated with God continue to be based on statements in the Bible, such as the Lord's Prayer, which states that the Father is in Heaven, while other attributes are derived from theological reasoning.

In the 8th century, John of Damascus listed eighteen attributes for God in his An Exact Exposition of the Orthodox Faith (Book 1, chapter 8). These eighteen attributes were divided into four groups based on time (such as being everlasting), space (such as being boundless), matter or quality and the list continues to be influential to date, partially appearing in some form in various modern formulations. In the 13th century, Thomas Aquinas focused on a shorter list of just eight attributes, namely simplicity, perfection, goodness, incomprehensibility, omnipresence, immutability, eternity and oneness. Other formulations include the 1251 list of the Fourth Lateran Council, which was then adopted at Vatican I in 1870 and the Westminster Shorter Catechism in the 17th century.

Two attributes of God that place him above the world, yet acknowledge his involvement in the world, are transcendence and immanence. Transcendence means that God is eternal and infinite, not controlled by the created world and beyond human events. Immanence means that God is involved in the world, and Christian teachings have long acknowledged his attention to human affairs. However, unlike pantheistic religions, in Christianity, God's being is not of the substance of the created universe.

Traditionally, some theologians such as Louis Berkhof distinguish between the incommunicable and communicable attributes of God. The former are those attributes which have no unqualified analogy in created things (e.g., simplicity and eternity), in other words, attributes that belong to God alone. The latter attributes are those which have some analogy in created things, especially humans (e.g., wisdom and goodness). Thus, following the classic definition of God in the Presbyterian Westminster Shorter Catechism, God is infinite, eternal and unchangeable in his being, wisdom, power, holiness, justice, goodness and truth. For example, he is wise, but infinite in his wisdom. Some such as Donald Macleod hold that all the suggested classifications are artificial and without basis.

Although there is no formal distinction in the Confession, Reformed authors have interpreted in it a specifically Reformed distinction between incommunicable and communicable attributes; the former being those which have no unqualified analogy in created things (e.g., simplicity and eternity), the latter being those which have some analogy in some created things such as humans (e.g., wisdom and goodness). The relationship between these two classes is such that the incommunicable attributes qualify all the communicable attributes, thus, God is infinite, eternal and unchangeable in his being, wisdom, power, holiness, justice, goodness and truth, following the classic definition of God in the Westminster Shorter Catechism. Thus, Article 1 is said to begin by enumerating the incommunicable attributes, but from 'almighty' to 'good' enumerates the communicable attributes.

There is a general agreement among theologians that it would be a mistake to conceive of the essence of God existing by itself and independently of the attributes or of the attributes being an additional characteristic of the Divine Being. They are essential qualities which exist permanently in his very Being and are co-existent with it. Any alteration in them would imply an alteration in the essential being of God.

Hick suggests that when listing the attributes of God, the starting point should be his self-existence ("aseity") which implies his eternal and unconditioned nature. Hick goes on to consider the following additional attributes: Creator being the source of all that composes his creation ("creatio ex nihilo") and the sustainer of what he has brought into being; personal; loving, good; and holy. Berkhof also starts with self-existence but moves on to immutability; infinity, which implies perfection eternity and omnipresence; unity. He then analyses a series of intellectual attributes: knowledge-omniscience; wisdom; veracity and then, the moral attributes of goodness (including love, grace, mercy and patience); holiness and righteousness before dealing finally with his sovereignty.

Gregory of Nyssa was one of the first theologians to argue, in opposition to Origen, that God is infinite. His main argument for the infinity of God, which can be found in Against Eunomius, is that God's goodness is limitless, and as God's goodness is essential, God is also limitless.

=== Depiction ===
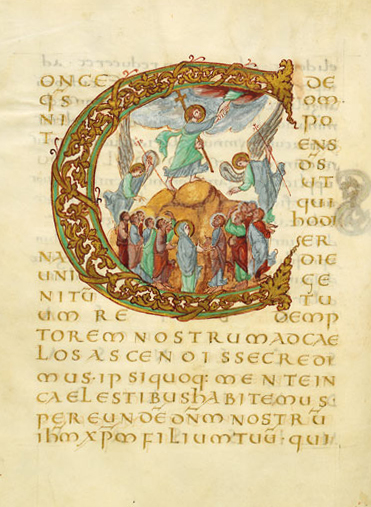
Use of the symbolic Hand of God in the Ascension from the Drogo Sacramentary, c. 850

Many early Christians believed that a number of verses within the Bible, (Note: One example is John 1:18: "No man has seen God at any time".) were meant to apply not only to God, but to all attempts aiming to depict God. However, early Christian art, such as that of the Dura Europos church, displays the Hand of God, a theological symbol representing the right hand of God, and Christ himself, along with many saints, are depicted. The Dura Europos synagogue nearby has numerous instances of the Hand of God symbol throughout its extensive decorative scheme, and is the only ancient synagogue with an extant decorative scheme. Dating to the mid-3rd century, the symbol was likely adopted into Early Christian art from Jewish art.

The Hand of God was common in Late Antique art in both the East and West, and remained the main way of symbolizing the actions or approval of God the Father in the West until the end of the Romanesque period. In art depicting specific Biblical scenes, such as the Baptism of Jesus, where a specific representation of God the Father was indicated, the Hand of God was used increasingly from the Carolingian period until the end of the Romanesque.

The use of religious images in general continued to increase up to the end of the 7th century, to the point that in 695, upon assuming the throne, Byzantine emperor Justinian II put an image of Christ on the obverse side of his gold coins, resulting in a rift which ended the use of Byzantine coin types in the Islamic world. However, the increase in religious imagery did not include depictions of God the Father. For instance, while the eighty second canon of the Council of Trullo in 692 did not specifically condemn images of the Father, it suggested that icons of Christ were preferred over Old Testament shadows and figures.

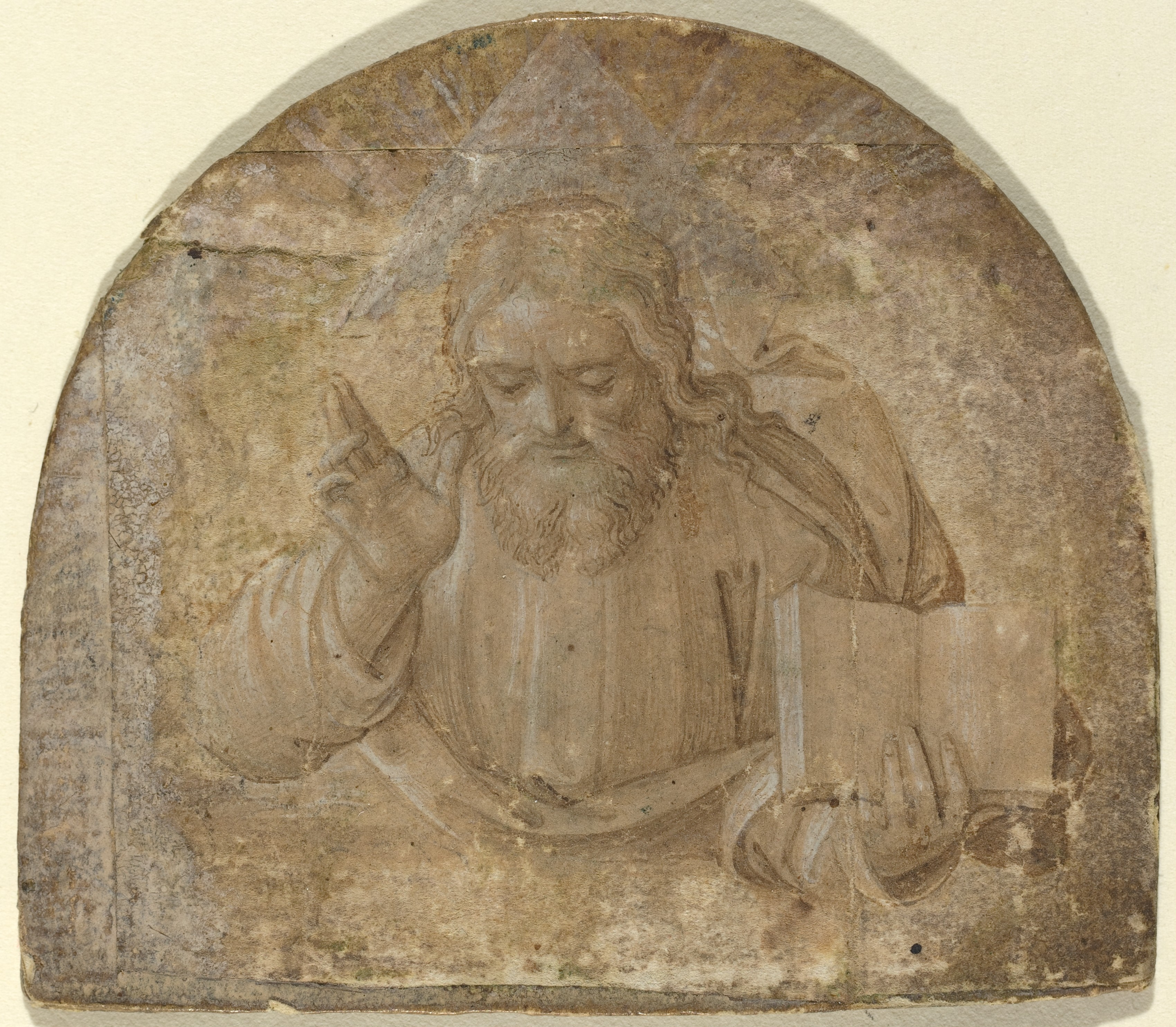
God the Father with His Right Hand Raised in Blessing, with a triangular halo representing the Trinity, Girolamo dai Libri c. 1555

The beginning of the 8th century witnessed the suppression and destruction of religious icons as the Byzantine iconoclasm (literally, "image struggle" or "war on icons") began. Emperor Leo III (717–741) suppressed the use of icons by imperial edict of the Byzantine Empire, presumably due to a military loss which he attributed to the undue veneration of icons. The edict (which was issued without consulting the church) forbade the veneration of religious images, but did not apply to other forms of art, including the image of the emperor, or religious symbols such as the cross. Theological arguments against icons then began to appear with iconoclasts arguing that icons could not represent both the divine and the human natures of Jesus at the same time. In this atmosphere, no public depictions of God the Father were even attempted and such depictions only began to appear two centuries later.

The Second Council of Nicaea in 787 effectively ended the first period of Byzantine iconoclasm and restored the honouring of icons and holy images in general. However, this did not immediately translate into large scale depictions of God the Father. Even supporters of the use of icons in the 8th century, such as John of Damascus, drew a distinction between images of God the Father and those of Christ.

In his treatise On the Divine Images, John of Damascus wrote: "In former times, God who is without form or body, could never be depicted. But now when God is seen in the flesh conversing with men, I make an image of the God whom I see". The implication is that insofar as God the Father or the Spirit did not become man, visible and tangible images and portrait icons would be inaccurate, and that what was true for the whole Trinity before Christ remains true for the Father and the Spirit, but not for the Word. John of Damascus wrote:

If we attempt to make an image of the invisible God, this would be sinful indeed. It is impossible to portray one who is without body: invisible, uncircumscribed and without form.

Around 790, Charlemagne ordered a set of four books that became known as the Libri Carolini ("Charles' books") to refute what his court understood to be the iconodule decrees of the Byzantine Second Council of Nicaea regarding sacred images. Although not well known during the Middle Ages, these books describe the key elements of the Catholic theological position on sacred images. To the Western Church, images were just objects made by craftsmen, to be utilized for stimulating the senses of the faithful, and to be respected for the sake of the subject represented, not in themselves.

The Council of Constantinople (869) (considered ecumenical by the Western Church, but not the Eastern Church) reaffirmed the decisions of the Second Council of Nicaea and helped stamp out any remaining coals of iconoclasm. Specifically, its third canon required the image of Christ to have veneration equal with that of a Gospel book:

We decree that the sacred image of our Lord Jesus Christ, the liberator and Savior of all people, must be venerated with the same honor as is given the book of the holy Gospels. For as through the language of the words contained in this book all can reach salvation, so, due to the action which these images exercise by their colors, all wise and simple alike, can derive profit from them.

Images of God the Father were not directly addressed in Constantinople in 869. A list of permitted icons was enumerated at this Council, but symbols of God the Father were not among them. However, the general acceptance of icons and holy images began to create an atmosphere in which God the Father could be symbolized.

Prior to the 10th century, no attempt was made to use a human figure to symbolize God the Father in Western art. Yet, Western art eventually required some way to illustrate the presence of the Father, so through successive representations a set of artistic styles for symbolizing the Father using a man gradually emerged around the 10th century. A rationale for the use of a human figure is the belief that God created the soul of Man in the image of his own (thus allowing humanity to transcend the other animals).

It appears that when early artists designed to represent God the Father, fear and awe restrained them from a usage of the whole human figure. Typically only a small part would be used as the image, usually the hand, or sometimes the face, but rarely a whole human figure. In many images, the figure of the Son supplants the Father, so a smaller portion of the person of the Father is depicted.

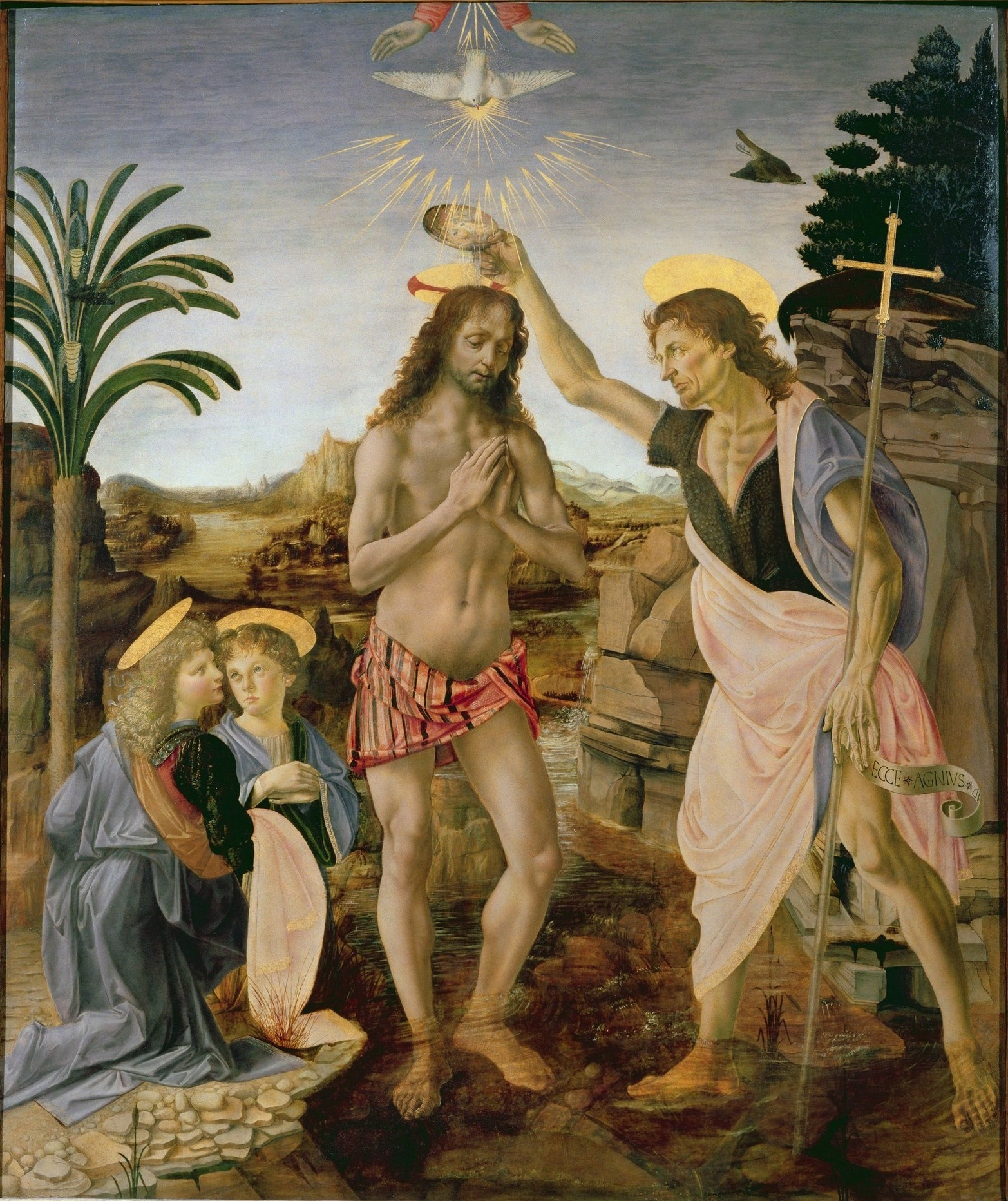
Depiction of two hands of God and the Holy Spirit as a dove in The Baptism of Christ by Andrea del Verrocchio and Leonardo da Vinci, 1472

By the 12th century depictions of God the Father had started to appear in French illuminated manuscripts, which as a less public form could often be more adventurous in their iconography, and in stained glass church windows in England. Initially the head or bust was usually shown in some form of frame of clouds in the top of the picture space, where the Hand of God had formerly appeared; the Baptism of Christ on the famous baptismal font in Liège of Rainer of Huy is an example from 1118 (a Hand of God is used in another scene). Gradually the amount of the human symbol shown can increase to a half-length figure, then a full-length, usually enthroned, as in Giotto's fresco of c. 1305 in Padua.

In the 14th century the Naples Bible carried a depiction of God the Father in the Burning bush. By the early 15th century, the Très Riches Heures du Duc de Berry has a considerable number of symbols, including an elderly but tall and elegant full-length figure walking in the Garden of Eden, which show a considerable diversity of apparent ages and dress. The "Gates of Paradise" of the Florence Baptistry by Lorenzo Ghiberti, begun in 1425 use a similar tall full-length symbol for the Father. The Rohan Book of Hours of about 1430 also included depictions of God the Father in half-length human form, which were now becoming standard, and the Hand of God becoming rarer. At the same period other works, like the large Genesis altarpiece by the Hamburg painter Meister Bertram, continued to use the old depiction of Christ as Logos in Genesis scenes. In the 15th century there was a brief fashion for depicting all three persons of the Trinity as similar or identical figures with the usual appearance of Christ.

In an early Venetian school Coronation of the Virgin by Giovanni d'Alemagna and Antonio Vivarini, (c. 1443) The Father is depicted using the symbol consistently used by other artists later, namely a patriarch, with benign, yet powerful countenance and with long white hair and a beard, a depiction largely derived from, and justified by, the near-physical, but still figurative, description of the Ancient of Days.

...the Ancient of Days did sit, whose garment was white as snow, and the hair of his head like the pure wool: his throne was like the fiery flame, and his wheels as burning fire. (Daniel 7:9)

In the Annunciation by Benvenuto di Giovanni in 1470, God the Father is portrayed in the red robe and a hat that resembles that of a Cardinal. However, even in the later part of the 15th century, the symbolic representation of the Father and the Holy Spirit as "hands and dove" continued, e.g. in Verrocchio's Baptism of Christ in 1472.

In Renaissance paintings of the adoration of the Trinity, God may be depicted in two ways, either with emphasis on The Father, or the three elements of the Trinity. The most usual depiction of the Trinity in Renaissance art depicts God the Father using an old man, usually with a long beard and patriarchal in appearance, sometimes with a triangular halo (as a reference to the Trinity), or with a papal crown, specially in Northern Renaissance painting. In these depictions, the Father may hold a globe or book (to symbolize God's knowledge and as a reference to how knowledge is deemed divine). He is behind and above Christ on the Cross in the Throne of Mercy iconography. A dove, the symbol of the Holy Spirit may hover above. Various people from different classes of society, e.g. kings, popes or martyrs may be present in the picture. In a Trinitarian pietà, God the Father is often symbolized using a man wearing a papal dress and a papal crown, supporting the dead Christ in his arms. They are depicted as floating in heaven with angels who carry the instruments of the Passion.

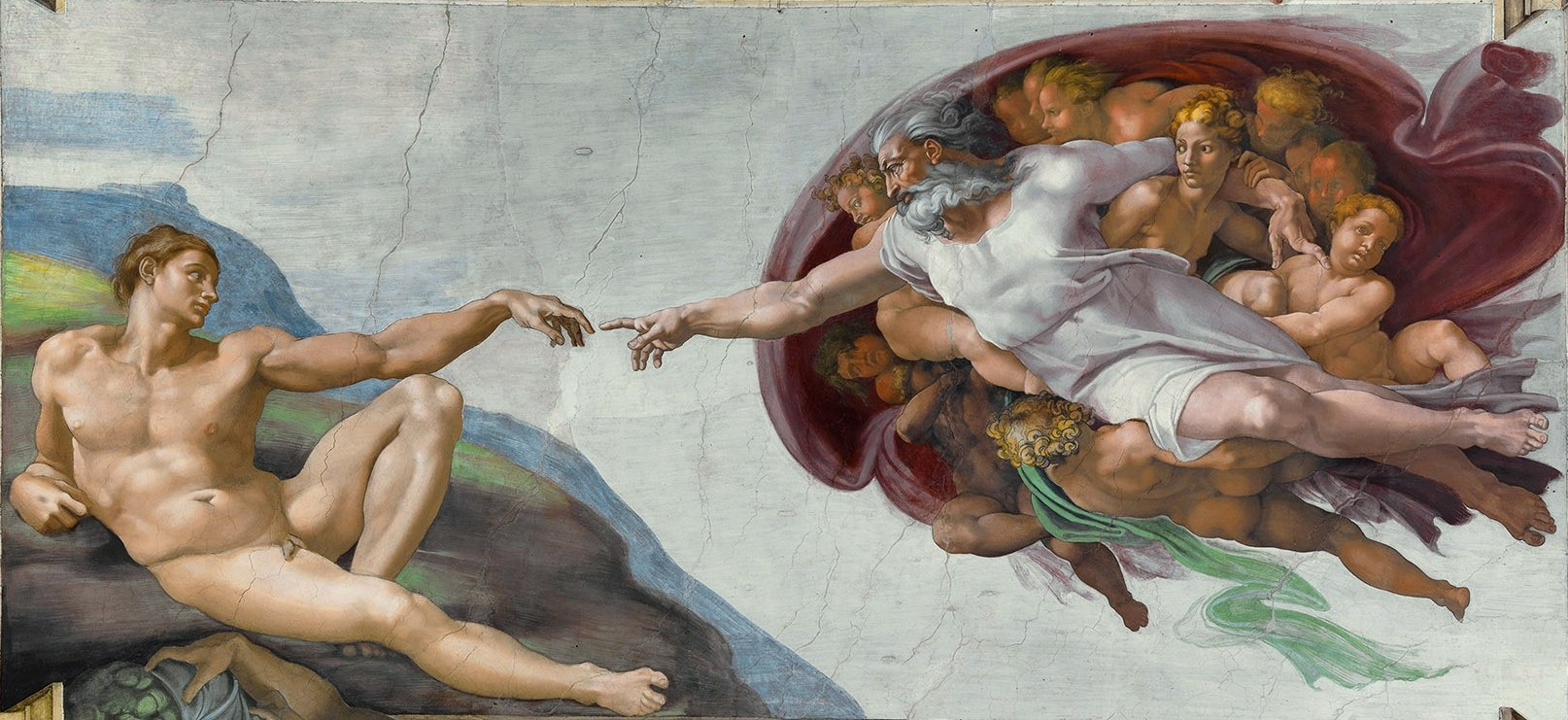
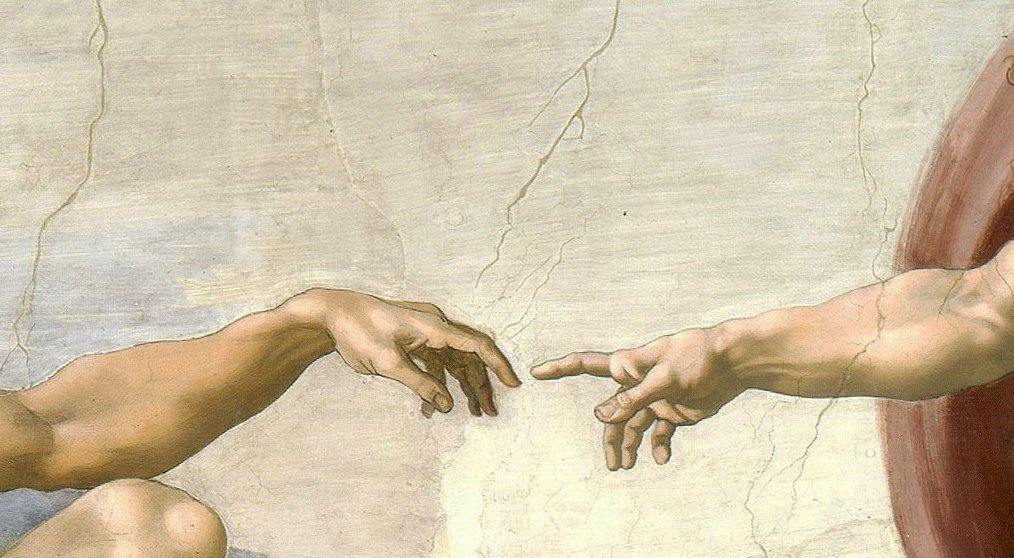
The famous The Creation of Adam by Michelangelo (below, detail of the hand of God), c. 1512

Representations of God the Father and the Trinity were attacked both by Protestants and within Catholicism, by the Jansenist and Baianist movements as well as more orthodox theologians. As with other attacks on Catholic imagery, this had the effect both of reducing church support for the less central depictions, and strengthening it for the core ones. In the Catholic Church, the pressure to restrain religious imagery resulted in the highly influential decrees of the final session of the Council of Trent in 1563. The Council of Trent decrees confirmed the traditional Catholic doctrine that images only represented the person depicted, and that veneration to them was paid to the person, not the image. The Council also reserved the right of bishops, and in cases of new artistic novelties, the Pope, to suppress images deemed non-canonical or heretical.

Traditional artistic depictions of God the Father which followed the conventions of the church were relatively uncontroversial in Catholic art thereafter, but less common, unusual depictions of the Trinity were condemned. In 1745 Pope Benedict XIV explicitly supported the Throne of Mercy depiction, referring to the "Ancient of Days", but in 1786 it was still necessary for Pope Pius VI to issue a papal bull condemning the decision of an Italian church council to remove all images of the Trinity from churches, including standard canonical ones.

God the Father is symbolized in several Genesis scenes in Michelangelo's Sistine Chapel ceiling, most famously The Creation of Adam (whose image of near touching hands of God and Adam is iconic of humanity, being a reminder that Man is created in the Image and Likeness of God (Gen 1:26)).God the Father is depicted as a powerful figure, floating in the clouds in Titian's Assumption of the Virgin in the Frari of Venice, long admired as a masterpiece of High Renaissance art. The Church of the Gesù in Rome includes a number of 16th century depictions of God the Father. In some of these paintings the Trinity is still alluded to in terms of three angels, but Giovanni Battista Fiammeri also depicted God the Father as a man riding on a cloud, above the scenes.

Rubens' Last Judgment (detail), 1617

In several of his painting, such as the Last Judgment, Rubens depicted God the Father using the image that by then had become widely accepted—a bearded patriarchal figure above the fray. While representations of God the Father were growing in Italy, Spain, Germany and the Low Countries, there was resistance elsewhere in Europe, even during the 17th century. In 1632 most members of the Star Chamber court in England (except the Archbishop of York) condemned the use of the images of the Trinity in church windows, and some considered them illegal. Later in the 17th century Sir Thomas Browne wrote that he considered the representation of God the Father using an old man "a dangerous act" that might lead to, in his words, "Egyptian symbolism". In 1847, Charles Winston was still critical of such images as a "Romish trend" (a derisive term used to refer to Roman Catholics) that he considered best avoided in England.

In 1667 the 43rd chapter of the Great Moscow Council specifically included a ban on a number of symbolic depictions of God the Father and the Holy Spirit, which then also resulted in a whole range of other icons being placed on the forbidden list, mostly affecting Western-style depictions which had been gaining ground in Orthodox icons. The Council also declared that the person of the Trinity who was the "Ancient of Days" was Christ, as Logos, not God the Father. However some icons continued to be produced in Russia, as well as Greece, Romania, and other Orthodox Christian-majority countries.

== Kingdom of God and eschatology ==
=== Kingship and Kingdom ===
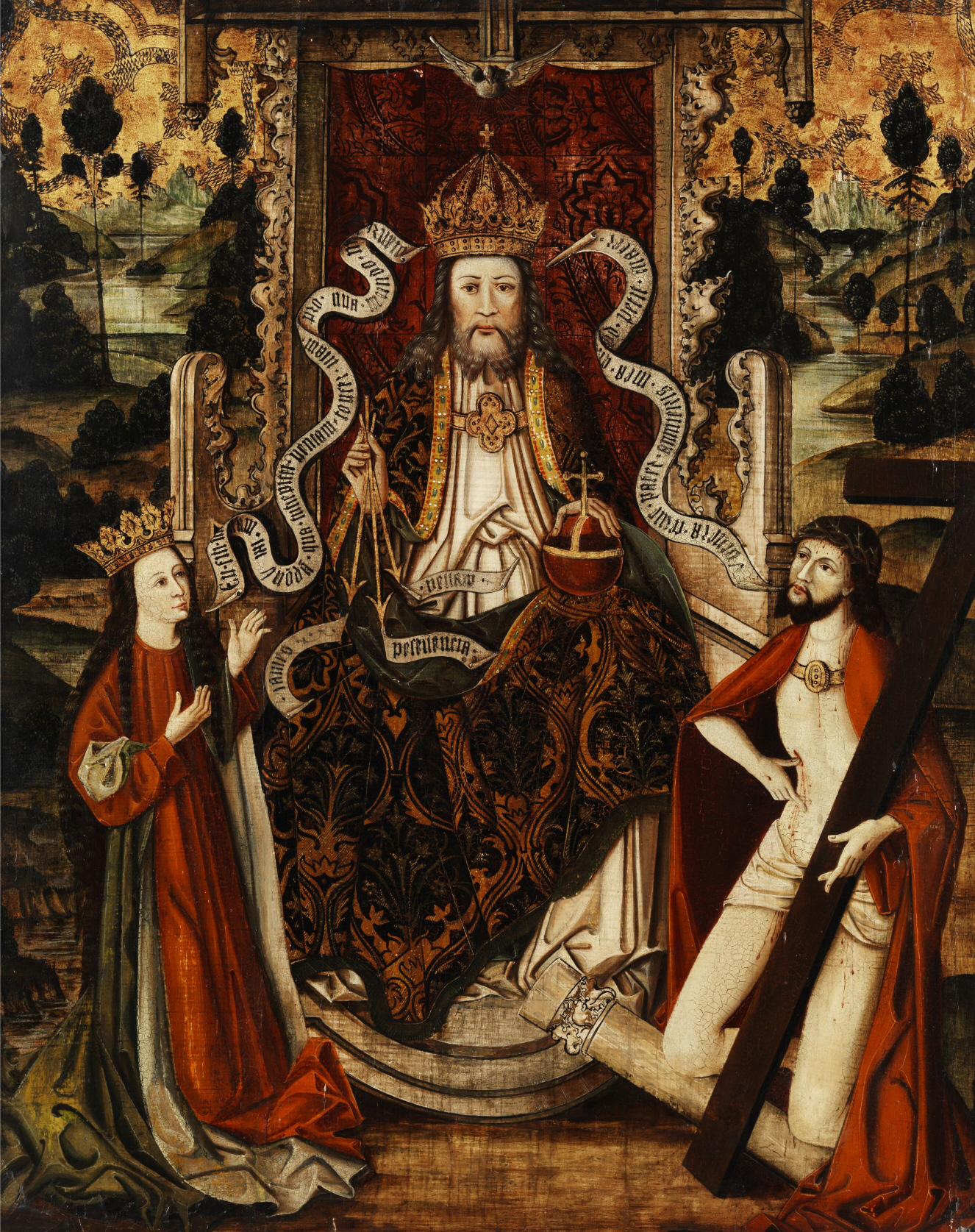
God the Father on a throne, Westphalia, Germany, late 15th century

The Christian characterization of the relationship between God and humanity involves the notion of the "Kingship of God", whose origins go back to the Old Testament, and may be seen as a consequence of the creation of the world by God. The "enthronement psalms" (Psalms 45, 93, 96, 97–99) provide a background for this view with the exclamation "The Lord is King". However, in later Judaism a more "national" view was assigned to God's Kingship in which the awaited Messiah may be seen as a liberator and the founder of a new state of Israel.

The term "Kingdom of God" does not appear in the Old Testament, although "his Kingdom" and "your Kingdom" are used in some cases when referring to God. However, the Kingdom of God (the Matthean equivalent being "Kingdom of Heaven") is a prominent phrase in the synoptic Gospels (appearing 75 times), and there is near unanimous agreement among scholars that it represents a key element of the teachings of Jesus. Yet, R. T. France points out that while the concept of "Kingdom of God" has an intuitive meaning to lay Christians, there is hardly any agreement among scholars about its meaning in the New Testament. Some scholars see it as a Christian lifestyle, some as a method of world evangelization, some as the rediscovery of charismatic gifts, others relate it to no present or future situation, but the world to come. France states that the phrase Kingdom of God is often interpreted in many ways to fit the theological agenda of those interpreting it.

=== End times ===
Interpretations of the term Kingdom of God have given rise to wide-ranging eschatological debates among scholars with diverging views, yet no consensus has emerged among scholars. From Augustine to the Protestant Reformation the arrival of the Kingdom had been identified with the formation of the Christian Church, but this view was later abandoned and by the beginning of the 20th century the apocalyptic interpretation of the Kingdom had gained ground. In this view (also called the "consistent eschatology") the Kingdom of God did not start in the 1st century, but is a future apocalyptic event that is yet to take place.

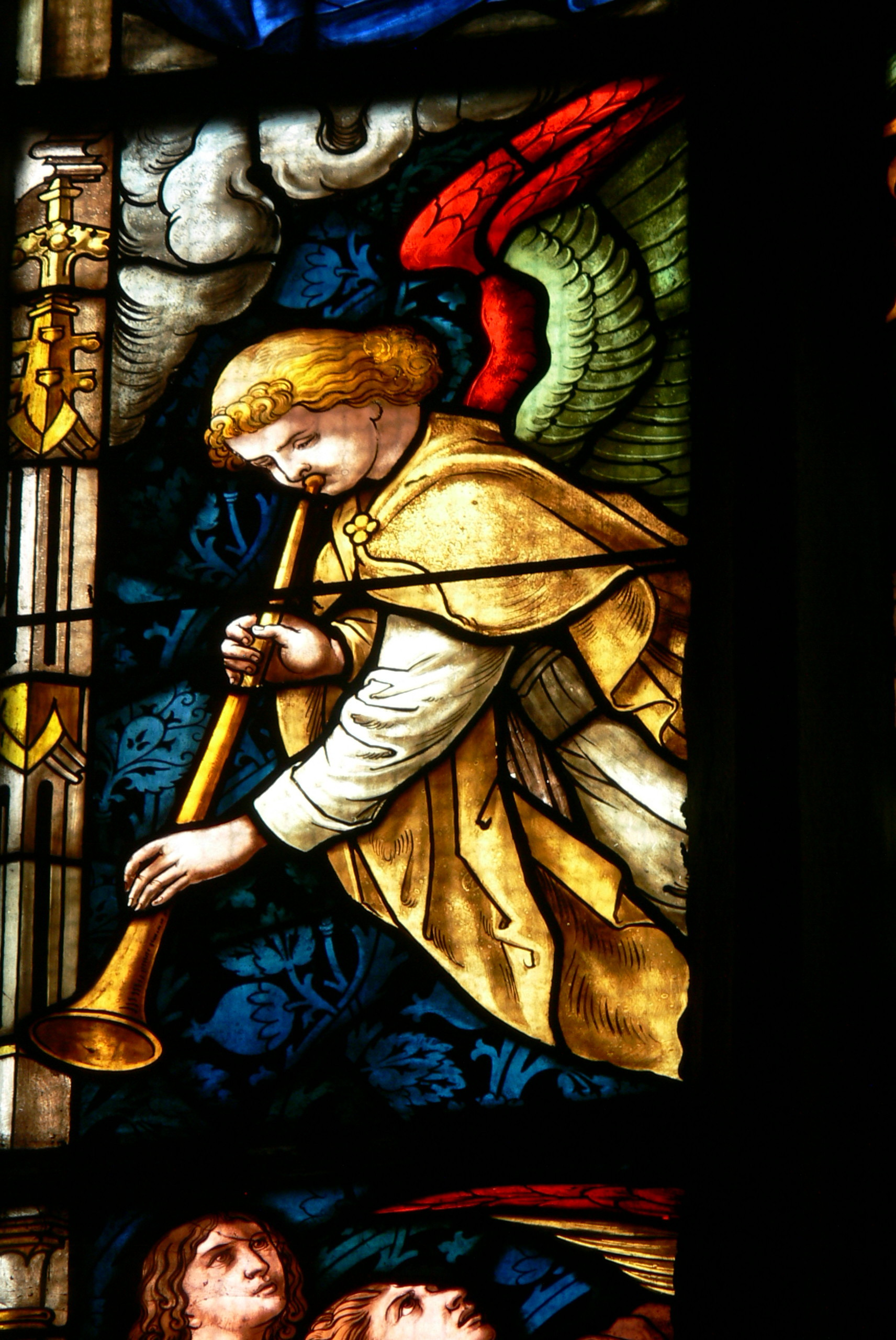
An angel blows the "last trumpet", as in 1 Corinthians 15:52, Langenzenn, Germany, 19th century

By the middle of the 20th century, realized eschatology, which in contrast viewed the Kingdom as non-apocalyptic but as the manifestation of divine sovereignty over the world (realized by the ministry of Jesus), had gathered a scholarly following. In this view the Kingdom is held to be available in the present. The competing approach of Inaugurated eschatology was later introduced as the "already and not yet" interpretation. In this view the Kingdom has already started, but awaits full disclosure at a future point. These diverging interpretations have since given rise to a good number of variants, with various scholars proposing new eschatological models that borrow elements from these.

=== Judgement ===
Hebrews 12:23 refers to "God the Judge of all", and the notion that all humans will eventually "be judged" is an essential element of Christian teachings. A number of New Testament passages (e.g., John 5:22 and Acts 10:42) and later credal confessions indicate that the task of judgement is assigned to Jesus. John 5:22 states that "neither does the Father judge any man, but he has given all judgment unto the Son". Acts 10:42 refers to the resurrected Jesus as: "he who is ordained of God to be the Judge of the living and the dead." The role played by Jesus in the judgement of God is emphasized in the most widely used Christian confessions, with the Nicene Creed stating that Jesus "sits on the right hand of the Father; shall come again, with glory, to judge the living and the dead; whose kingdom shall have no end". The Apostles' Creed includes a similar confession.

A number of gospel passages warn against sin and suggest a path of righteousness to avoid the judgement of God. For instance, the Sermon on the Mount in Matthew 5:22–26 teaches the avoidance of sin and the Parables of the Kingdom (Matthew 13:49) state that at the moment of judgement the angels will "sever the wicked from among the righteous and shall cast them into the furnace of fire". Christians can thus enjoy forgiveness that lifts them from the judgement of God by following the teachings of Jesus and through a personal fellowship with him.

== Trinitarianism ==
=== History and foundation ===
In early Christianity, the concept of salvation was closely related to the invocation of the "Father, Son and Holy Spirit". Since the 1st century, Christians have called upon God with the name "Father, Son and Holy Spirit" in prayer, baptism, communion, exorcism, hymn-singing, preaching, confession, absolution and benediction. This is reflected in the saying: "Before there was a 'doctrine' of the Trinity, Christian prayer invoked the Holy Trinity".

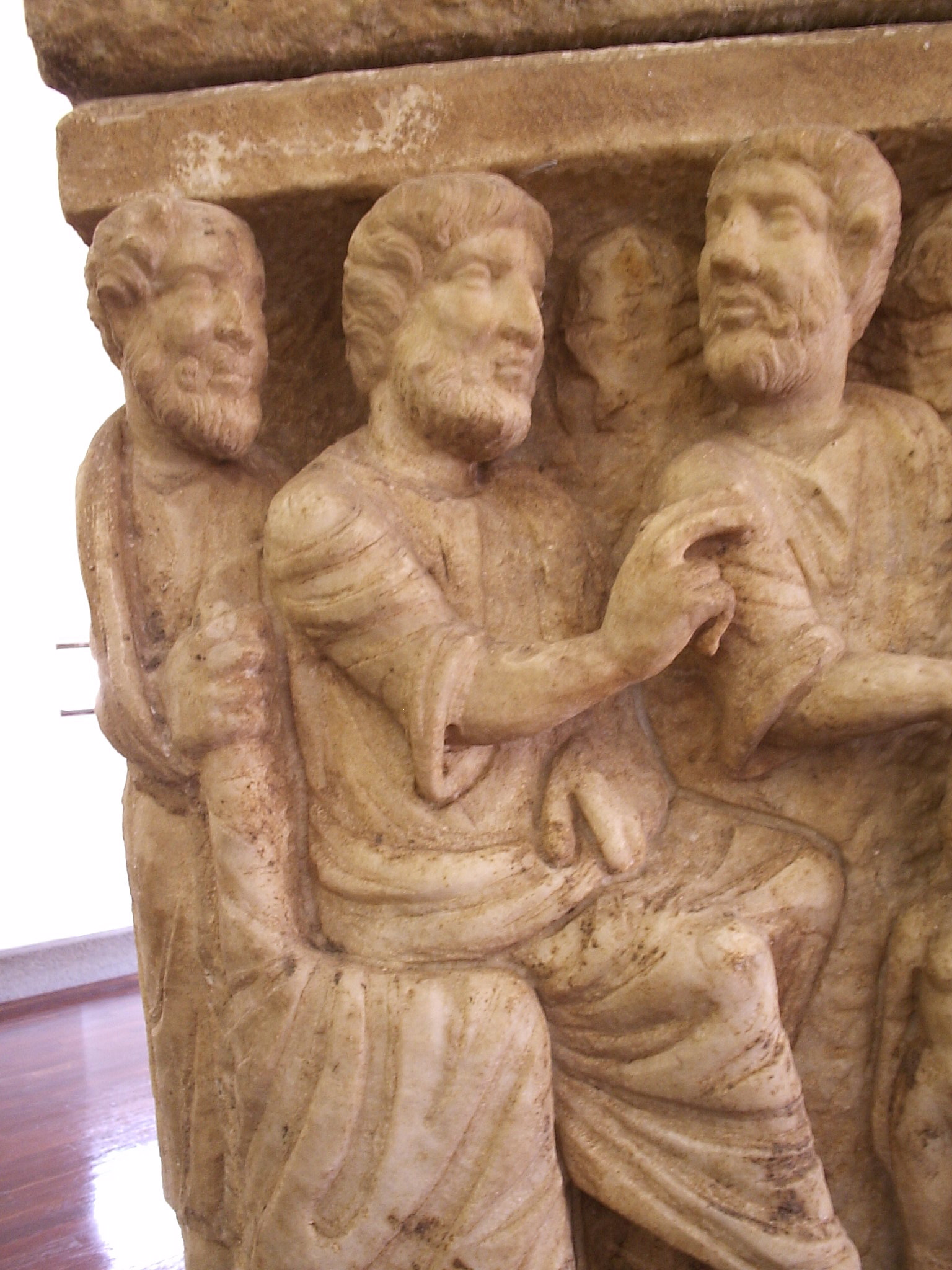
The earliest known depiction of the Trinity, Dogmatic Sarcophagus, 350 AD Vatican Museums.

The term "Trinity" does not explicitly appear in the Bible, but Trinitarians believe the concept as later developed is consistent with biblical teachings. The New Testament includes a number of the usages of the three-fold liturgical and doxological formula, e.g., 2 Corinthians 1:21–22 stating: "he that establisheth us with you in Christ, and anointed us, is God; who also sealed us, and gave [us] the earnest of the Spirit in our hearts". Christ receiving "authority and co-equal divinity" is mentioned in Matthew 28:18: "All authority hath been given unto me in heaven and on earth" as well as John 3:35, John 13:3, John 17:1. And the Spirit being both "of God" and "of Christ" appears in Galatians 4:6, the Book of Acts (16:7), John 15:26 and Romans 8:14–17.

The general concept was expressed in early writings from the beginning of the 2nd century forward, with Irenaeus writing in his Against Heresies (Book I Chapter X):

"The Church ... believes in one God, the Father Almighty, Maker of heaven, and earth, and the sea, and all things that are in them; and in one Christ Jesus, the Son of God, who became incarnate for our salvation; and in the Holy Spirit".

Around AD 213 in Adversus Praxeas (chapter 3) Tertullian provided a formal representation of the concept of the Trinity, i.e., that God exists as one "substance" but three "Persons": The Father, the Son and the Holy Spirit. In defense of the coherence of the Trinity Tertullian wrote (Adversus Praxeas 3): "The Unity which derives the Trinity out of its own self is so far from being destroyed, that it is actually supported by it." Tertullian also discussed how the Holy Spirit proceeds from the Father and the Son.

The First Council of Nicaea in AD 325 and later the First Council of Constantinople in AD 381 defined the dogma "in its simplest outlines in the face of pressing heresies" and the version used thereafter dates to 381. In the 5th century, in the west, Augustine of Hippo expanded on the theological development in his On the Trinity, while the major development in the east was due to John of Damascus in the 8th century. The theology eventually reached its classical form in the writings of Thomas Aquinas in the 13th century.

Bernhard Lohse (1928–1997) states that the doctrine of the Trinity does not go back to non-Christian sources such as Plato or Hinduism and that all attempts at suggesting such connections have floundered. The majority of Christians are now Trinitarian and regard belief in the Trinity as a test of true orthodoxy of belief.

=== The doctrine ===
A diagram of the Trinity consisting of God the Father, God the Son (Jesus), and God the Holy Spirit

The doctrine of the Trinity is considered by most Christians to be a core tenet of their faith. It can be summed up as:

The One God exists in Three Persons and One Substance.

Strictly speaking, the doctrine is a mystery that can "neither be known by unaided human reason" nor "cogently demonstrated by reason after it has been revealed"; even so, "it is not contrary to reason," being "not incompatible with the principles of rational thought". The doctrine was expressed at length in the 4th-century Athanasian Creed, of which the following is an extract:

We worship one God in Trinity, and Trinity in Unity;

Neither confounding the persons nor dividing the substance.

For there is one Person of the Father, another of the Son, and another of the Holy Spirit.

But the Godhead of the Father, of the Son, and of the Holy Spirit, is all one; the Glory equal, the Majesty co-eternal.

Such as the Father is, such is the Son, and such is the Holy Spirit.

To Trinitarian Christians (who include Catholic Christians, Eastern Orthodox Christians, and most Protestant denominations), God the Father is not at all a separate god from the Son and the Holy Spirit, the other hypostases ("Persons") of the Christian Godhead.

While "Father" and "Son" implicitly invoke masculine sex, the gender of God in Christianity has historically been treated as metaphorical, and not as representing the real nature of God.

The 20th century witnessed an increased theological focus on the doctrine of the Trinity, partly due to the efforts of Karl Barth in his four-volume Church Dogmatics. This theological focus relates the revelation of the Word of God to the Trinity is what distinguishes the "Christian concept of God" from those of all other religions.

==== The Father ====
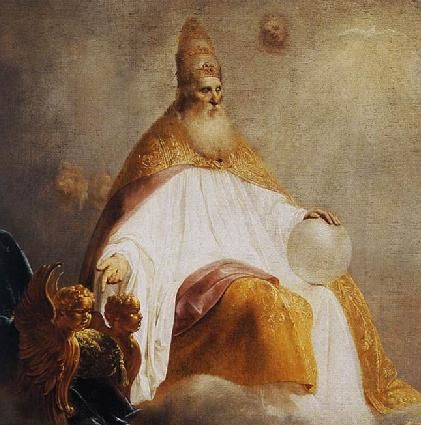
Depiction of God the Father (detail) offering the right hand throne to Christ, Pieter de Grebber, 1654.

The emergence of Trinitarian theology of God the Father in early Christianity was based on two key ideas: first, the shared identity of the Yahweh of the Old Testament and the God of Jesus in the New Testament, and second, the self-distinction and yet the unity between Jesus and his Father. An example of the unity of Son and Father is Matthew 11:27: "No one knows the Son except the Father and no one knows the Father except the Son," asserting the mutual knowledge of Father and Son.

The concept of fatherhood of God does appear in the Old Testament but is not a major theme. While the view of God as the Father was used in the Old Testament, it only became a focus in the New Testament, as Jesus frequently referred to it. This is manifested in the Lord's Prayer, which combines the earthly needs of daily bread with the reciprocal concept of forgiveness. And Jesus' emphasis on his special relationship with the Father highlights the importance of the distinct yet unified natures of Jesus and the Father, building to the unity of Father and Son in the Trinity.

The paternal view of God as the Father extends beyond Jesus to his disciples, and the entire church, as reflected in the petitions Jesus submitted to the Father for his followers at the end of the Farewell Discourse, the night before his crucifixion. Instances of this in the Farewell Discourse are John 14:20 as Jesus addresses the disciples: "I am in my Father, and you in me, and I in you" and in John 17:22 as he prays to the Father: "I have given them the glory that you gave me, that they may be one as we are one."

In Trinitarian theology, God the Father is the "arche" or "principium" (beginning), the "source" or "origin" of both the Son and the Holy Spirit, and is considered the eternal source of the Godhead. The Father is the one who eternally begets the Son, and the Father eternally breathes the Holy Spirit. The Son is eternally born from God the Father, and the Spirit eternally proceeds from the Father, and, in the Western tradition, also from the Son.

Yet, notwithstanding this difference as to origin, Father is one with, co-equal to, co-eternal, and con-substantial with the Son and the Holy Spirit, each Person being the one eternal God and in no way separated, who is the creator: all alike are uncreated and omnipotent. Thus, the Divine Unity consists of God the Father, with his Son and his Spirit distinct from God the Father and yet perfectly united together in him. Because of this, the Trinity is beyond reason and can only be known by revelation.

Trinitarians believe that God the Father is not pantheistic, in that he is not viewed as identical to the universe, but exists outside of creation, as its Creator. He is viewed as a loving and caring God, a Heavenly Father who is active both in the world and in people's lives. He created all things visible and invisible in love and wisdom, and man for his own sake.

==== The Son ====
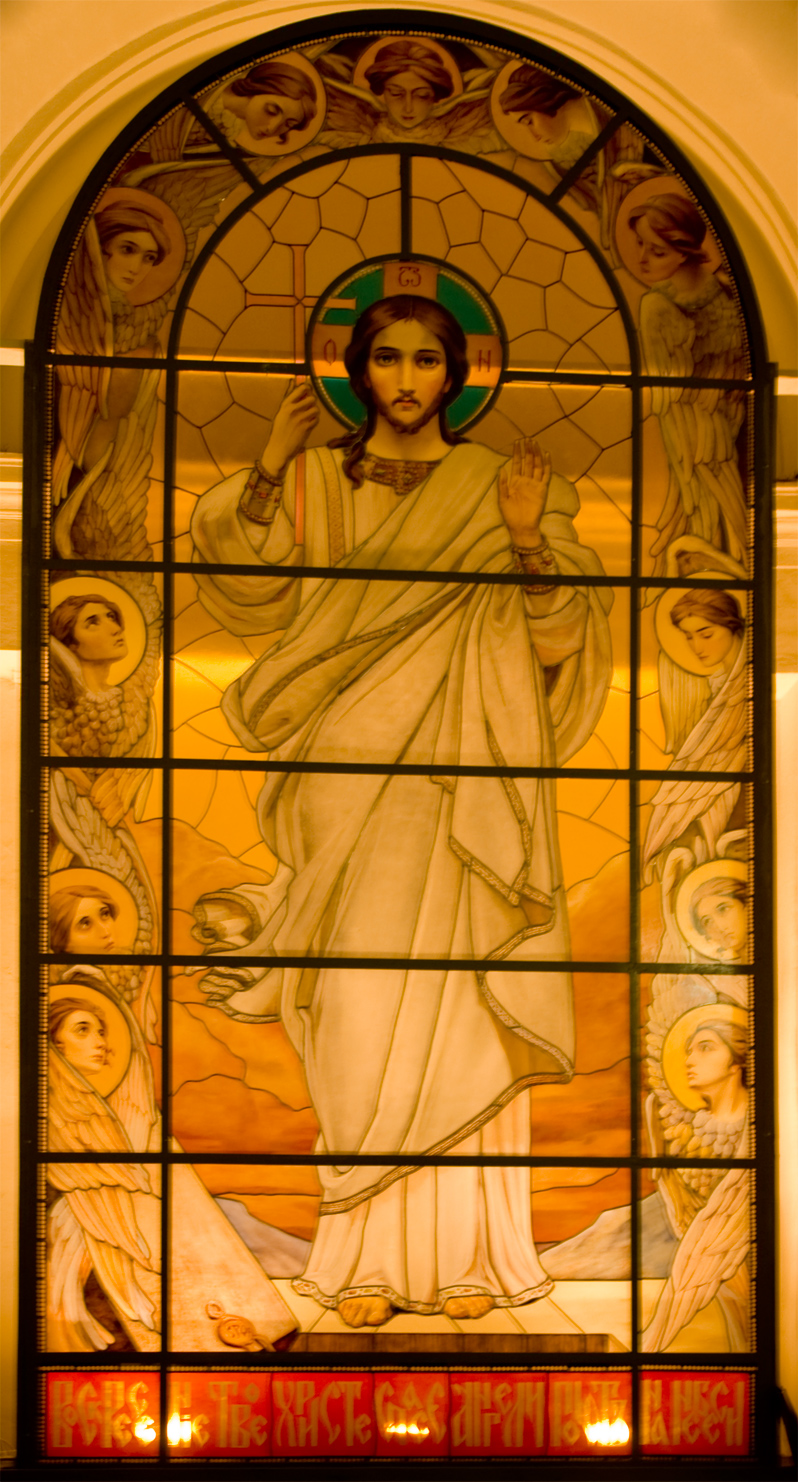
Jesus depicted in a stained glass window, Peter and Paul Cathedral, St. Petersburg, Russia.

Since early Christianity, a number of titles have been attributed to Jesus, including, Messiah (Christ) and the Son of God. Theologically, these are different attributions: Messiah refers to his fulfilling the expected Old Testament prophecies, while Son of God refers to a paternal relationship. God the Son is distinct from both Messiah and Son of God and its theology as part of the doctrine of the Trinity was formalized well over a century after those.

According to the Gospels, Jesus was conceived by the Holy Spirit and born from the Virgin Mary. The Biblical accounts of Jesus' ministry include: his baptism, miracles, preaching, teaching, and healing. The narrative of the gospels place significant emphasis on the death of Jesus, devoting about one third of the text to just seven days, namely the last week of the life of Jesus in Jerusalem. The core Christian belief is that through the death and resurrection of Jesus, sinful humans can be reconciled to God and thereby are offered salvation and the promise of eternal life. The belief in the redemptive nature of Jesus' death predates the Pauline letters and goes back to the earliest days of Christianity and the Jerusalem church. The Nicene Creed's statement that "for our sake he was crucified" is a reflection of this core belief.

The two Christological concerns as to how Jesus could be truly God while preserving faith in the existence of one God and how the human and the divine could be combined in one person were fundamental concerns from well before the First Council of Nicaea (325). However, the theology of "God the Son" was eventually reflected in the statement of the Nicene Creed of the 4th century.

The Chalcedonian Definition of 451, accepted by the majority of Christians, holds that Jesus is God incarnate and "true God and true man" (or both fully divine and fully human). Jesus, having become fully human in all respects, suffered the pains and temptations of a mortal man, yet he did not sin. As fully God, he defeated death and rose to life again. The Third Council of Constantinople in 680 then held that both divine and human wills exist in Jesus, with the divine will having precedence, leading and guiding the human will.

In mainstream Christianity, Jesus Christ as God the Son is the second Person of the Holy Trinity, due to his eternal relation to the first Person (God as Father). He is considered coequal with the Father and Holy Spirit and is all God and all human: the Son of God as to his divine nature, while as to his human nature he is from the lineage of David.

More recently, discussions of the theological issues related to God the Son and its role in the Trinity were addressed in the 20th century in the context of a "Trinity-based" perspective on divine revelation.

==== The Holy Spirit ====
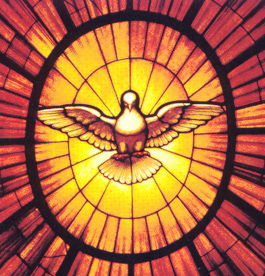
Church stained glass representation of the Holy Spirit as a dove, Bernini c. 1660.

In mainstream Christianity, the Holy Spirit is one of the three divine persons of the Trinity who make up the single substance of God; that is, the Spirit is considered to act in concert with and share an essential nature with God the Father and God the Son (Jesus). The New Testament has much to say about the Holy Spirit. The Holy Spirit's presence was especially felt following the ascension of Christ, although not to the exclusion of an early presence as attested by the Old Testament and throughout the New Testament. The Christian theology of the Holy Spirit, or pneumatology (from Greek pneuma or "spirit"), was the last piece of Trinitarian theology to be fully explored and developed, and there is thus greater theological diversity among Christian understandings of the Spirit than there is among understandings of the Son and the Father. Within Trinitarian theology, the Holy Spirit is usually referred to as the "Third Person" of the triune God—with the Father being the First Person and the Son the Second Person.

Reflecting the Annunciation in Luke 1:35, the early Apostles' Creed states that Jesus was "conceived by the Holy Spirit". The Nicene Creed refers to the Holy Spirit as "the Lord and Giver of Life" who with the Father and the Son together is "worshiped and glorified". While in the act of the Incarnation, God the Son became manifest as the Son of God, the same did not take place for God the Holy Spirit which remained unrevealed. Yet, as in 1 Corinthians 6:19 God the Spirit continues to dwell in bodies of the faithful.

In Christian theology Holy Spirit is believed to perform specific divine functions in the life of the Christian or the church. The action of the Holy Spirit is seen as an essential part of the bringing of the person to the Christian faith. The new believer is "born again of the Spirit". (Note: Though the term "born again" is most frequently used by evangelical Christians, most denominations do consider that the new Christian is a "new creation" and "born again". See for example the Catholic Encyclopedia Archived 28 February 2009 at the Wayback Machine)

The Holy Spirit enables Christian life by dwelling in the individual believers and enables them to live a righteous and faithful life. He acts as Comforter or Paraclete, one who intercedes, or supports or acts as an advocate, particularly in times of trial. He acts to convince unredeemed persons both of the sinfulness of their actions and thoughts, and of their moral standing as sinners before God. The Holy Spirit both inspired the writing of the scriptures and now interprets them to the Christian and church.

=== Trinitarian differences ===
In Eastern Orthodox theology, essence of God being that which is beyond human comprehension and can not be defined or approached by human understanding. Roman Catholic teachings are somewhat similar in considering the mysteries of the Trinity as being beyond human reason. However, differences exist in that in Roman Catholic theology and teaching, God the Father is the eternal source of the Son (begot the Son by an eternal generation) and of the Holy Spirit (by an eternal procession from the Father and the Son) and the one who breathes the Holy Spirit with and through the Son, but the Eastern Orthodox consider the Spirit to proceed from the Father alone.

Most Protestant denominations and other traditions arising since the Reformation hold general Trinitarian beliefs and theology regarding God the Father similar to that of Roman Catholicism. This includes churches arising from Anabaptism, Anglicanism, Baptist, Lutheranism, Methodism, Moravianim, Plymouth Brethren, Quakerism and Reformed Christianity. Likewise, The Oxford Dictionary of the Christian Church describes the Trinity as "the central dogma of Christian theology". However, a precise representative view of Protestant Trinitarian theology regarding "God the Father", etc., is more difficult to provide, given the diverse and less centralized nature of the various Protestant churches.

== Nontrinitarianism ==
Some Christian traditions reject the doctrine of the Trinity, and are called nontrinitarian. These groups differ from one another in their views, variously depicting Jesus as a divine being second only to God the Father, Yahweh of the Old Testament in human form, God (but not eternally God), prophet, or simply a holy man. Some broad definitions of Protestantism categorise these nontrinitarian traditions as Protestant, but most definitions do not.

Nontrinitarianism goes back to the early centuries of Christian history and groups such as the Arians, Ebionites, Gnostics, and others. These nontrinatarian views were rejected by many bishops such as Irenaeus and subsequently by the Ecumenical councils. The Nicene Creed raised the issue of the relationship between Jesus' divine and human natures. After it was rejected by the Council of Nicea, nontrinitarianism was rare among Christians for many centuries, and those rejecting the doctrine of the Trinity faced hostility from other Christians, but the 19th century saw the establishment of a number of groups in North America and elsewhere.

In Jehovah's Witnesses beliefs, only God the Father is the one almighty God, even over his Son Jesus Christ. While the Witnesses acknowledge Christ's pre-existence, perfection, and unique "Sonship" with God the Father, and believe that Christ had an essential role in creation and redemption, and is the Messiah, they believe that only the Father is without beginning.

The Church of Jesus Christ of Latter-day Saints teaches that the Godhead is a divine unity of three distinct beings: Elohim (the Father), Jehovah (the Son, or Jesus), and the Holy Ghost. In Latter-day Saint theology, the Father and the Son both possess glorified, perfected, physical bodies "as tangible as man's," whereas the Holy Ghost has a body of spirit only. Latter-day Saints recognize the divinity of the Father, Son and Holy Spirit, and understand that these beings are "one in every significant and eternal aspect imaginable except believing Them to be three persons combined in one substance..." which Latter-day Saints believe is "...a Trinitarian notion never set forth in the scriptures because it is not true." Latter-day Saints believe that God is omniscient, omnipotent, and omni-benevolent.

Oneness Pentecostals advance a form of Modalistic Monarchianism that states that there is one God, a singular divine Spirit, who manifests himself in many ways, including as Father, Son, and Holy Spirit.

== See also ==
- Attributes of God in Christianity
- Catholic Church § Nature of God
- Conceptions of God
- Diversity in early Christian theology
- Ethical monotheism
- Existence of God
- God in Abrahamic religions
  - God in Judaism
  - God in Islam
  - God in the Baháʼí Faith
  - God in Mormonism
  - Jehovah's Witnesses beliefs § God

== Bibliography ==
- Hayes, Christine (2012). "Understanding Biblical Monotheism". Introduction to the Bible. The Open Yale Courses Series. New Haven, Connecticut and London, England: Yale University Press. pp. 15–28. ISBN 9780300181791. JSTOR j.ctt32bxpm.6.
- Jenkins, David. Guide to the Debate about God. London: Lutterworth Press, 1966.
- Jinkins, Michael (2001). Invitation to Theology: A Guide to Study, Conversation & Practice. Westmont, Illinois: InterVarsity Press. ISBN 9780830815623.
- Kärkkäinen, Veli-Matti, ed. (2010). Holy Spirit and Salvation: The Sources of Christian Theology. Louisville, Kentucky: Westminster John Knox Press. ISBN 9780664231361.
- Kärkkäinen, Veli-Matti (2002). Pneumatology: The Holy Spirit in Ecumenical, International, and Contextual Perspective. Ada, Michigan: Baker Academic. ISBN 9780801024481.
- Ratzinger, Joseph (2004) [1968]. "Part One: God – Chapter II: The Biblical Belief in God". Introduction to Christianity (2nd Revised ed.). San Francisco, California: Ignatius Press. pp. 116–136. ISBN 9781586170295. LCCN 2004103523. S2CID 169456327.
- Reeves, Michael (2022). Delighting in the Trinity: An Introduction to the Christian Faith. InterVarsity Press. ISBN 978-0-8308-4707-5.
