= Naples Bible =

Second printed Hebrew Bible

The Naples Bible is the second printed Old Testament Bible in Hebrew. The first complete printed Hebrew Bible, by a single publisher, and without commentary, was published by the Soncino brothers in 1488, in Soncino. This was then followed by the Naples Bible in 1491–1493. It is not to be confused with a 14th-century illuminated manuscript Bible, in the Latin Vulgate, also known as the "Illuminated Naples Bible".
