= Permanent mold casting =

Metal casting process that employs reusable molds

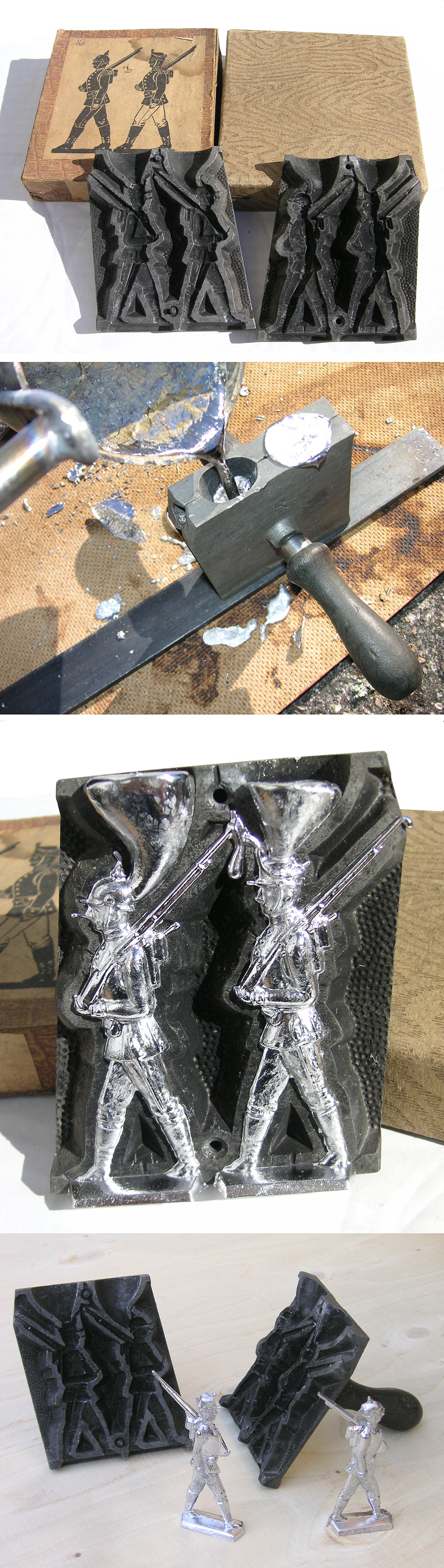
Permanent mold casting

Permanent mold casting is a metal casting process that employs reusable molds ("permanent molds"), usually made from metal. The most common process uses gravity to fill the mold, however gas pressure or a vacuum are also used. A variation on the typical gravity casting process, called slush casting, produces hollow castings. Common casting metals are aluminium, magnesium, and copper alloys. Other materials include tin, zinc, and lead alloys and iron and steel are also cast in graphite molds.

Typical products are components such as gears, splines, wheels, gear housings, pipe fittings, fuel injection housings, and automotive engine pistons.

== Process ==
There are four main types of permanent mold casting: gravity, slush, low-pressure, and vacuum.

=== Gravity process ===
The gravity process begins by preheating the mold to 150–200 °C (302–392 °F). to ease the flow and reduce thermal damage to the casting. The mold cavity is then coated with a refractory material or a mold wash, which prevents the casting from sticking to the mold and prolongs the mold life. Any sand or metal cores are then installed and the mold is clamped shut. Molten metal is then poured into the mold. Soon after solidification the mold is opened and the casting removed to reduce chances of hot tears. The process is then started all over again, but preheating is not required because the heat from the previous casting is adequate and the refractory coating should last several castings. Because this process is usually carried out on large production run work-pieces automated equipment is used to coat the mold, pour the metal, and remove the casting.

The metal is poured at the lowest practical temperature in order to minimize cracks and porosity. The pouring temperature can range greatly depending on the casting material; for instance zinc alloys are poured at approximately 370 °C (698 °F), while Gray iron is poured at approximately 1,370 °C (2,500 °F).

==== Mold ====
Molds for the casting process consist of two halves. Casting molds are usually formed from gray cast iron because it has about the best thermal fatigue resistance, but other materials include steel, bronze, and graphite. These metals are chosen because of their resistance to erosion and thermal fatigue. They are usually not very complex because the mold offers no collapsibility to compensate for shrinkage. Instead the mold is opened as soon as the casting is solidified, which prevents hot tears. Cores can be used and are usually made from sand or metal.

As stated above, the mold is heated prior to the first casting cycle and then used continuously in order to maintain as uniform a temperature as possible during the cycles. This decreases thermal fatigue, facilitates metal flow, and helps control the cooling rate of the casting metal.

Venting usually occurs through the slight crack between the two mold halves, but if this is not enough then very small vent holes are used. They are small enough to let the air escape but not the molten metal. A riser must also be included to compensate for shrinkage. This usually limits the yield to less than 60%.

Mechanical ejectors in the form of pins are used when coatings are not enough to remove casts from the molds. These pins are placed throughout the mold and usually leave small round impressions on the casting.

=== Slush ===
Slush casting is a variant of permanent molding casting to create a hollow casting or hollow cast. In the process the material is poured into the mold and allowed to cool until a shell of material forms in the mold. The remaining liquid is then poured out to leave a hollow shell. The resulting casting has good surface detail but the wall thickness can vary. The process is usually used to cast ornamental products, such as candlesticks, lamp bases, and statuary, from low-melting-point materials. A similar technique is used to make hollow chocolate figures for Easter and Christmas.

The method was developed by William Britain in 1893 for the production of lead toy soldiers. It uses less material than solid casting, and results in a lighter and less expensive product. Hollow cast figures generally have a small hole where the excess liquid is poured out.

Similarly, a process called slush molding is used in automotive dashboard manufacture, for soft-panel interiors with artificial leather, where a free-flowing (behaves like a liquid) powder plastic compound, either PVC or TPU, is poured into a hot, hollow mold and a viscous skin forms. Excess slush is then drained off, the mold is cooled, and the molded product is stripped out.

=== Low-pressure ===
Schematic of the low-pressure permanent mold casting process

Low-pressure permanent mold (LPPM) casting uses a gas at low pressure, usually between 3 and 15 psi (20 to 100 kPa) to push the molten metal into the mold cavity. The pressure is applied to the top of the pool of liquid, which forces the molten metal up a refractory pouring tube and finally into the bottom of the mold. The pouring tube extends to the bottom of the ladle so that the material being pushed into the mold is exceptionally clean. No risers are required because the applied pressure forces molten metal in to compensate for shrinkage. Yields are usually greater than 85% because there is no riser and any metal in the pouring tube just falls back into the ladle for reuse.

The vast majority of LPPM casting are from aluminum and magnesium, but some are copper alloys. Advantages include very little turbulence when filling the mold because of the constant pressure, which minimizes gas porosity and dross formation. Mechanical properties are about 5% better than gravity permanent mold castings. The disadvantage is that cycles times are longer than gravity permanent mold castings.

=== Vacuum ===
Vacuum permanent mold casting retains all of the advantages of LPPM casting, plus the dissolved gases in the molten metal are minimized and molten metal cleanliness is even better. The process can handle thin-walled profiles and gives an excellent surface finish. Mechanical properties are usually 10 to 15% better than gravity permanent mold castings. The process is limited in weight to 0.2 to 5 kg (0.44 to 11.02 lb).

== Advantages and disadvantages ==
The main advantages are the reusable mold, good surface finish, good dimensional accuracy, and high production rates. Typical tolerances are 0.4 mm for the first 25 mm (0.98 in) for the first inch) and 0.02 mm for each additional centimeter (0.002 in per in); if the dimension crosses the parting line add an additional 0.25 mm (0.0098 in). Typical surface finishes are 2.5 to 7.5 μm (100–250 μin) RMS. A draft of 2 to 3° is required. Wall thicknesses are limited to 3 to 50 mm (0.12 to 1.97 in). Typical part sizes range from 100 g to 75 kg (several ounces to 150 lb). Other advantages include the ease of inducing directional solidification by changing the mold wall thickness or by heating or cooling portions of the mold. The fast cooling rates created by using a metal mold results in a finer grain structure than sand casting. Retractable metal cores can be used to create undercuts while maintaining a quick action mold.

There are three main disadvantages: high tooling cost, limited to low-melting-point metals, and short mold life. The high tooling costs make this process uneconomical for small production runs. When the process is used to cast steel or iron the mold life is extremely short. For lower melting point metals the mold life is longer but thermal fatigue and erosion usually limit the life to 10,000 to 120,000 cycles. The mold life is dependent on four factors: the mold material, the pouring temperature, the mold temperature, and the mold configuration. Molds made from gray cast iron can be more economical to produce but have short mold lives. On the other hand, molds made from H13 tool steel may have a mold life several times greater. The pouring temperature is dependent on the casting metal, but the higher the pouring temperature the shorter the mold life. A high pouring temperature can also induce shrinkage problems and create longer cycle times. If the mold temperature is too low misruns are produced, but if the mold temperature is too high then the cycle time is prolonged and mold erosion is increased. Large differences in section thickness in the mold or casting can decrease mold life as well.
