= Foundry =

Factory that produces metal castings

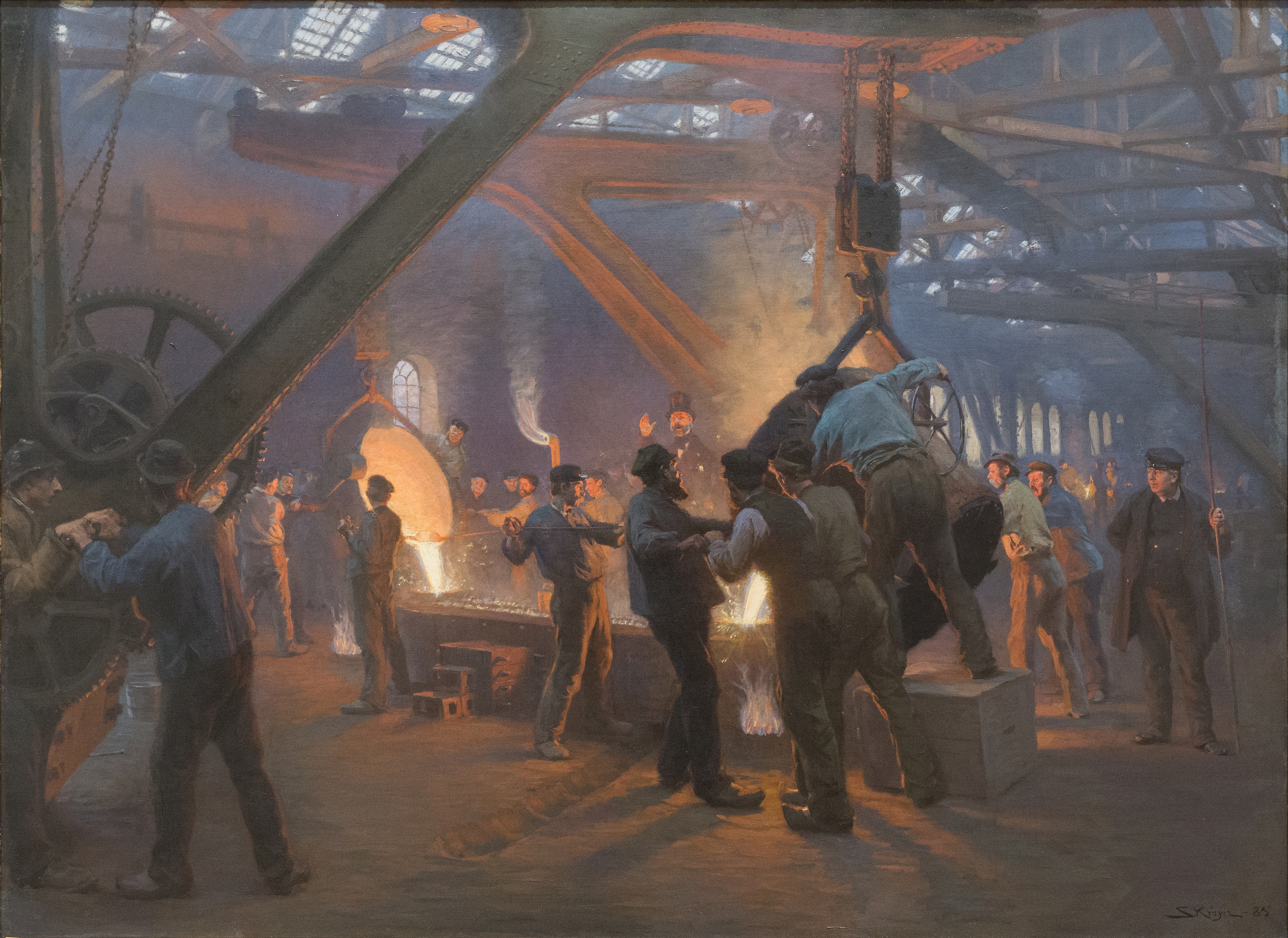
The Iron Foundry, Burmeister & Wain, by Peder Severin Krøyer, 1885

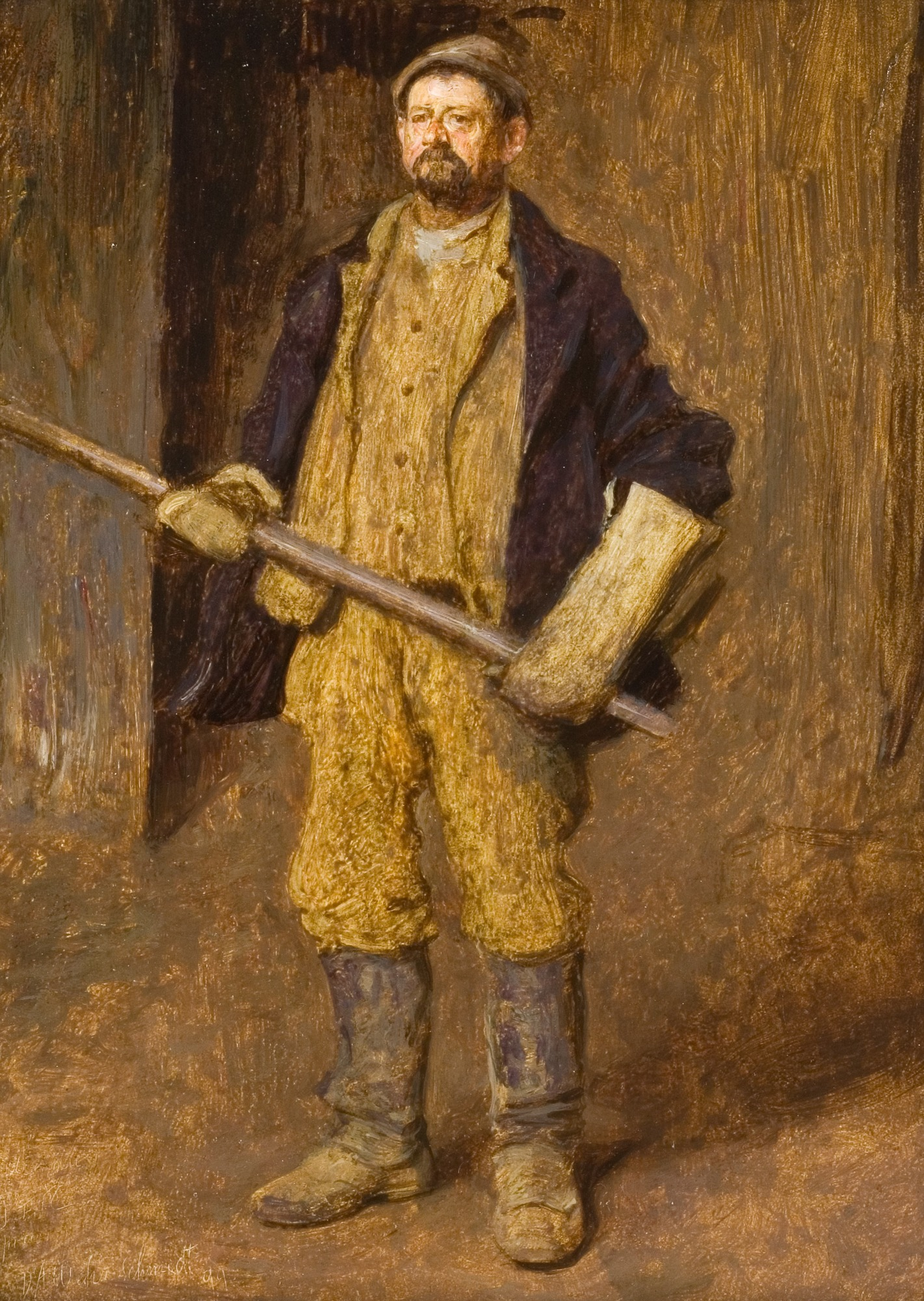
A Foundryman, pictured by Daniel A. Wehrschmidt in 1899

A foundry is a factory that produces metal castings. Metals are cast into shapes by melting them into a liquid, pouring the metal into a mold, and removing the mold material after the metal has solidified as it cools. The most common metals processed are aluminium and cast iron. However, other metals, such as bronze, brass, steel, magnesium, and zinc, are also used to produce castings in foundries. In this process, parts of desired shapes and sizes can be formed.

Foundries are one of the largest contributors to the manufacturing recycling movement, melting and recasting millions of tons of scrap metal every year to create new durable goods. Moreover, many foundries use sand in their molding process. These foundries often use, recondition, and reuse sand, which is another form of recycling.

== Process ==
In metalworking, casting involves pouring liquid metal into a mold, which contains a hollow cavity of the desired shape, and then allowing it to cool and solidify. The solidified part is also known as a casting, which is ejected or broken out of the mold to complete the process. Casting is most often used for making complex shapes that would be difficult or uneconomical to make by other methods.

=== Melting ===
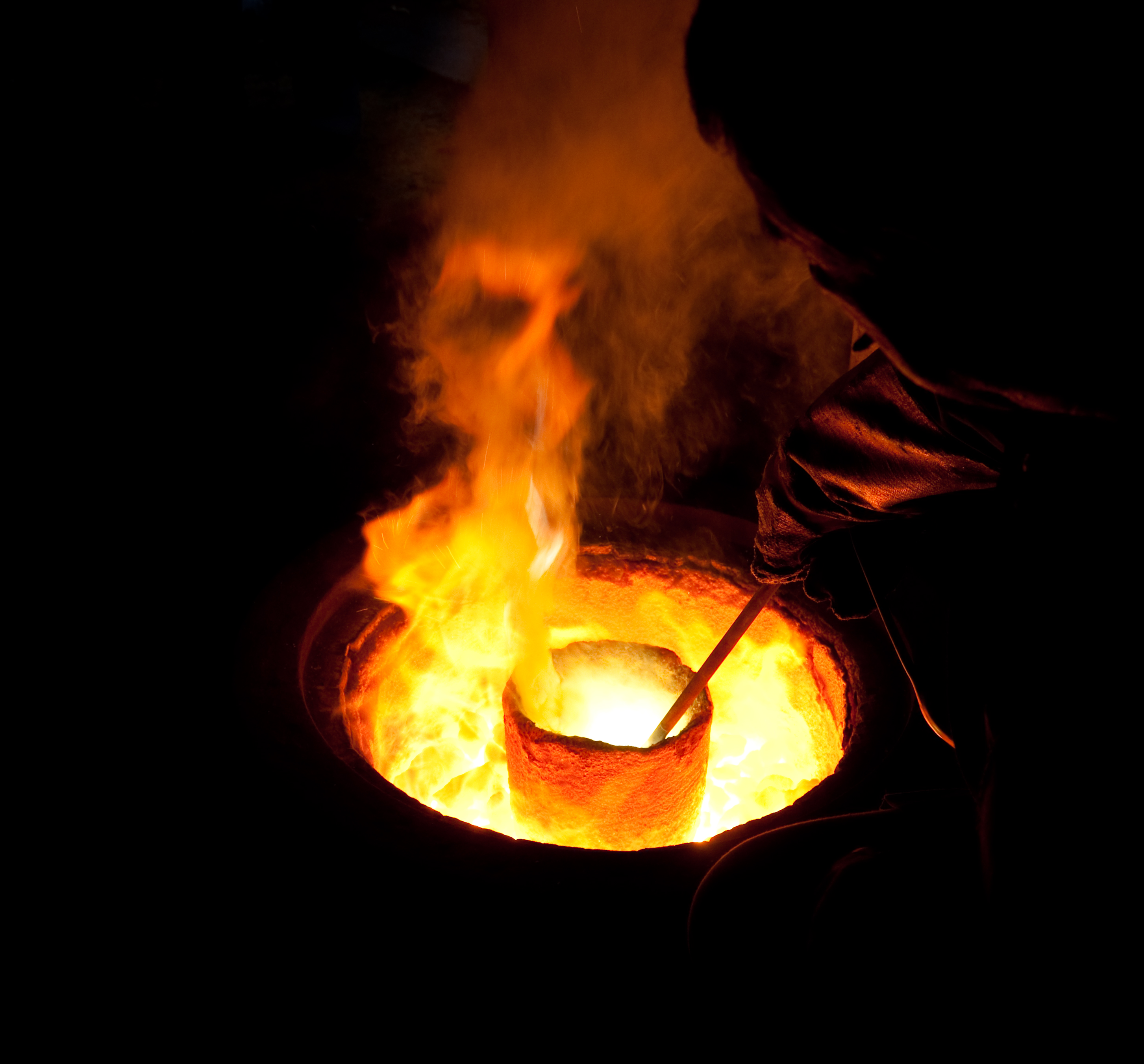
Melting metal in a crucible for casting

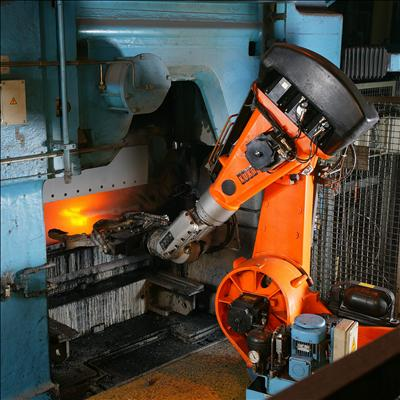
A metal die casting robot in an industrial foundry

Melting is performed in a furnace. Virgin material, external scrap, internal scrap, and alloying elements are used to charge the furnace. Virgin material refers to commercially pure forms of the primary metal used to form a particular alloy. Alloying elements are either pure forms of an alloying element, like electrolytic nickel, or alloys of limited composition, such as ferroalloys or master alloys. External scrap is material from other forming processes such as punching, forging, or machining. Internal scrap consists of gates, risers, defective castings, and other extraneous metal oddments produced within the facility.

The process includes melting the charge, refining the melt, adjusting the melt chemistry and tapping into a transport vessel. Refining is done to remove harmful gases and elements from the molten metal to avoid casting defects. Material is added during the melting process to bring the final chemistry within a specific range specified by industry and/or internal standards. Certain fluxes may be used to separate the metal from slag and/or dross, and degassers are used to remove dissolved gas from metals that readily dissolve in gasses. During the tap, final chemistry adjustments are made.

==== Furnace ====
Several specialised furnaces are used to heat the metal. Furnaces are refractory-lined vessels that contain the material to be melted and provide the energy to melt it. Modern furnace types include electric arc furnaces (EAF), induction furnaces, cupolas, reverberatory, and crucible furnaces. Furnace choice is dependent on the alloy system quantities produced. For ferrous materials EAFs, cupolas, and induction furnaces are commonly used. Reverberatory and crucible furnaces are common for producing aluminium, bronze, and brass castings.

Furnace design is a complex process, and the design can be optimized based on multiple factors. Furnaces in foundries can be any size, ranging from small ones used to melt precious metals to furnaces weighing several tons, designed to melt hundreds of pounds of scrap at one time. They are designed according to the type of metals that are to be melted. Furnaces must also be designed based on the fuel being used to produce the desired temperature. For low temperature melting point alloys, such as zinc or tin, melting furnaces may reach around 500 °C (932 °F). Electricity, propane, or natural gas are usually used to achieve these temperatures. For high melting point alloys such as steel or nickel-based alloys, the furnace must be designed for temperatures over 1,600 °C (2,910 °F). The fuel used to reach these high temperatures can be electricity (as employed in electric arc furnaces) or coke. The majority of foundries specialize in a particular metal and have furnaces dedicated to these metals. For example, an iron foundry (for cast iron) may use a cupola, induction furnace, or EAF, while a steel foundry will use an EAF or induction furnace. Bronze or brass foundries use crucible furnaces or induction furnaces. Most aluminium foundries use either electric resistance or gas heated crucible furnaces or reverberatory furnaces.

=== Degassing ===
Degassing is a process that may be required to reduce the amount of hydrogen present in a batch of molten metal. Gases can form in metal castings in one of two ways:

1. by physical entrapment during the casting process or
2. by chemical reaction in the cast material.

Hydrogen is a common contaminant for most cast metals. It forms as a result of material reactions or from water vapor or machine lubricants. If the hydrogen concentration in the melt is too high, the resulting casting will be porous; the hydrogen will exit the molten solution, leaving minuscule air pockets, as the metal cools and solidifies. Porosity often seriously deteriorates the mechanical properties of the metal.

An efficient way of removing hydrogen from the melt is to bubble a dry, insoluble gas through the melt by purging or agitation. When the bubbles go up in the melt, they catch the dissolved hydrogen and bring it to the surface. Chlorine, nitrogen, helium and argon are often used to degas non-ferrous metals. Carbon monoxide is typically used for iron and steel.

There are various types of equipment that can measure the presence of hydrogen. Alternatively, the presence of hydrogen can be measured by determining the density of a metal sample.

In cases where porosity still remains present after the degassing process, porosity sealing can be accomplished through a process called metal impregnating.

=== Mold making ===
Diagrams of two pattern types

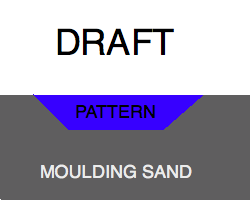
A diagram of draft on a pattern

In the casting process, a pattern is made in the shape of the desired part. Simple designs can be made in a single piece or solid pattern. More complex designs are made in two parts, called split patterns. A split pattern has a top or upper section, called a cope, and a bottom or lower section called a drag. Both solid and split patterns can have cores inserted to complete the final part shape. Cores are used to create hollow areas in the mold that would otherwise be impossible to achieve. Where the cope and drag separates is called the parting line.

When making a pattern it is best to taper the edges so that the pattern can be removed without breaking the mold. This is called draft. The opposite of draft is an undercut where there is part of the pattern under the mold material, making it impossible to remove the pattern without damaging the mold.

The pattern is made of wax, wood, plastic, or metal. The molds are constructed by several different processes dependent upon the type of foundry, metal to be poured, quantity of parts to be produced, size of the casting, and complexity of the casting. These mold processes include:

- Sand casting – Green or resin bonded sand mold.
- Lost-foam casting – Polystyrene pattern with a mixture of ceramic and sand mold.
- Investment casting – Wax or similar sacrificial pattern with a ceramic mold.
- Ceramic mold casting – Plaster mold.
- V-process casting – Vacuum with thermoformed plastic to form sand molds. No moisture, clay or resin required.
- Die casting – Metal mold.
- Billet (ingot) casting – Simple mold for producing ingots of metal, normally for use in other foundries.
- Loam molding – a built up mold used for casting large objects, such as cannon, steam engine cylinders, and bells.

=== Pouring ===
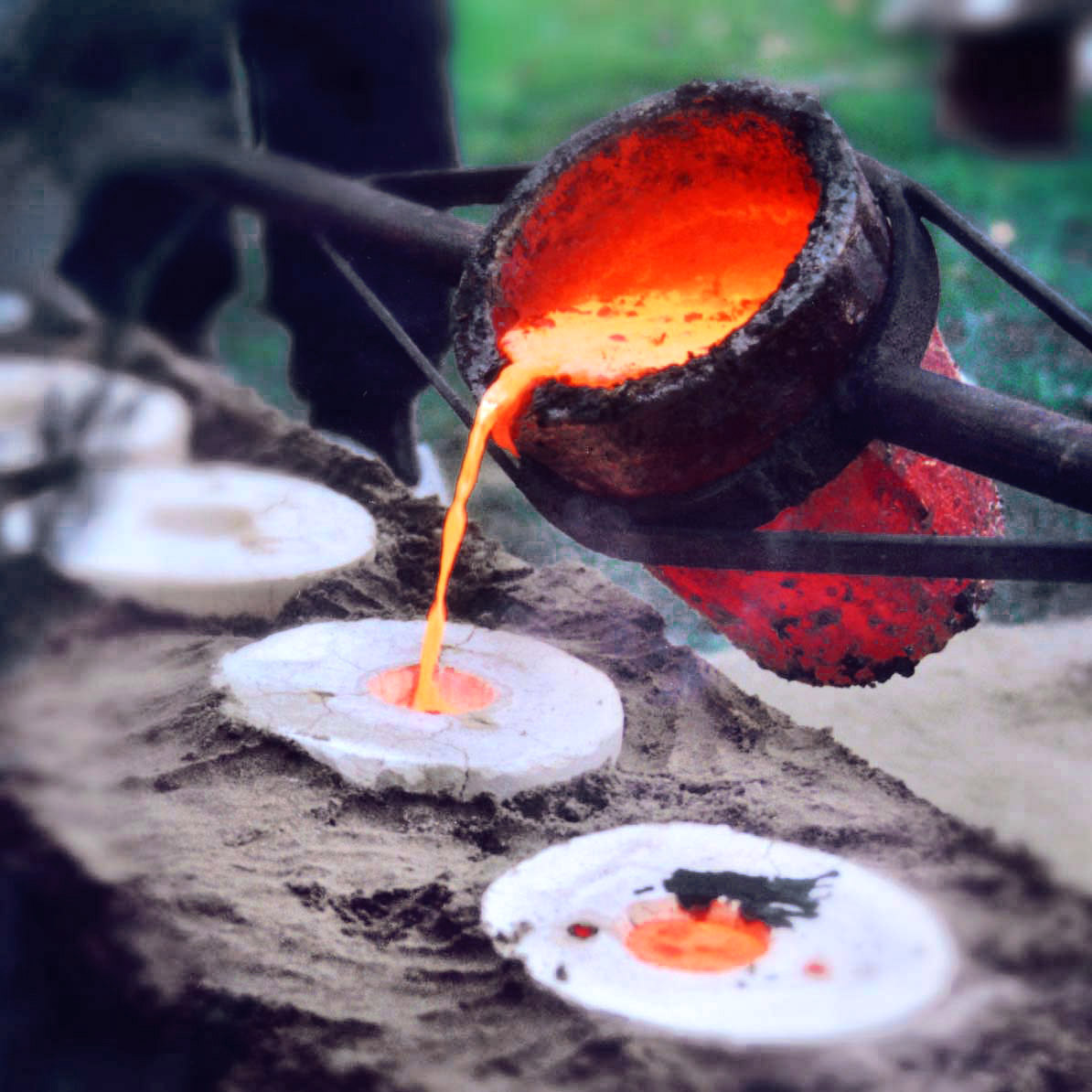
Bronze poured from a crucible into a mold, using the lost-wax casting process

In a foundry, molten metal is poured into molds. Pouring can be accomplished with gravity, or it may be assisted with a vacuum or pressurized gas. Many modern foundries use robots or automatic pouring machines to pour molten metal. Traditionally, molds were poured by hand using ladles.

=== Shakeout ===
The solidified metal component is then removed from its mold. Where the mold is sand based, this can be done by shaking or tumbling. This frees the casting from the sand, which is still attached to the metal runners and gates – which are the channels through which the molten metal traveled to reach the component itself.

=== Degating ===
Degating is the removal of the heads, runners, gates, and risers from the casting. Runners, gates, and risers may be removed using cutting torches, bandsaws, or ceramic cutoff blades. For some metal types, and with some gating system designs, the sprue, runners, and gates can be removed by breaking them away from the casting with a sledge hammer or specially designed knockout machinery. Risers must usually be removed using a cutting method (see above) but some newer methods of riser removal use knockoff machinery with special designs incorporated into the riser neck geometry that allow the riser to break off at the right place.

The gating system required to produce castings in a mold yields leftover metal – including heads, risers, and sprue (sometimes collectively called sprue) — that can exceed 50% of the metal required to pour a full mold. Since this metal must be remelted as salvage, the yield of a particular gating configuration becomes an important economic consideration when designing various gating schemes, to minimize the cost of excess sprue, and thus overall melting costs.

=== Heat treating ===
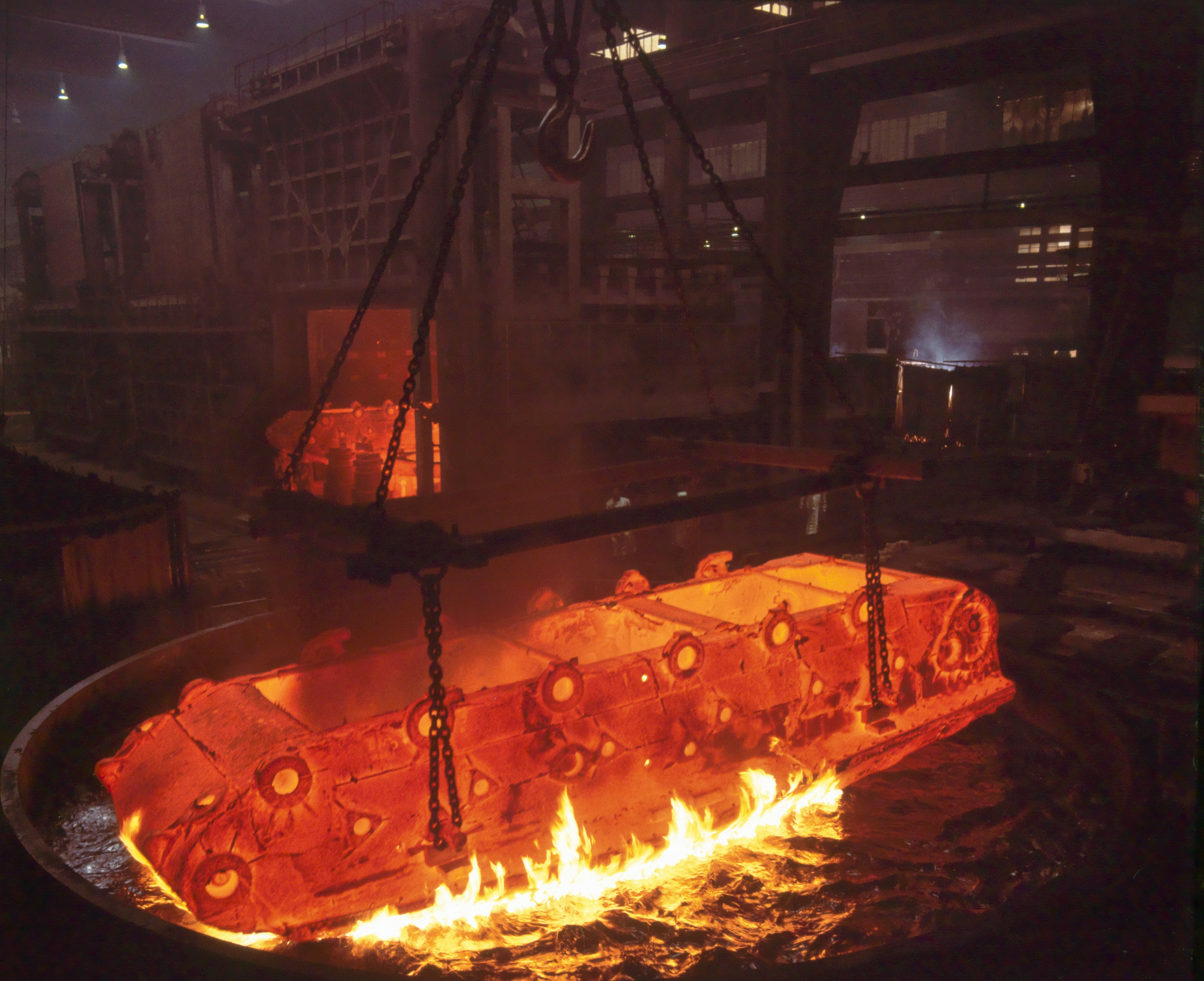
A tank hull undergoing heat treatment

Heat treating is a group of industrial and metalworking processes used to alter the physical, and sometimes chemical, properties of a material. The most common application is metallurgical. Heat treatments are also used in the manufacture of many other materials, such as glass. Heat treatment involves the use of heating or chilling, normally to extreme temperatures, to achieve a desired result such as hardening or softening of a material. Heat treatment techniques include annealing, case-hardening, precipitation strengthening, tempering, and quenching. Although the term "heat treatment" applies only to processes where the heating and cooling are done for the specific purpose of altering properties intentionally, heating and cooling often occur incidentally during other manufacturing processes such as hot forming or welding.

=== Surface cleaning ===
After degating and heat treating, sand or other molding media may remain adhered to the casting. To remove any mold remnants, the surface is cleaned using a blasting process. This means a granular media will be propelled against the surface of the casting to mechanically knock away the adhering sand. The media may be blown with compressed air, or may be hurled using a shot wheel. The cleaning media strikes the casting surface at high velocity to dislodge the mold remnants (for example, sand, slag) from the casting surface. Numerous materials may be used to clean cast surfaces, including steel, iron, other metal alloys, aluminium oxides, glass beads, walnut shells, baking powder, and many others. The blasting media is selected to develop the color and reflectance of the cast surface. Terms used to describe this process include cleaning, bead blasting, and sand blasting. Shot peening may be used to further work-harden and finish the surface.

=== Finishing ===
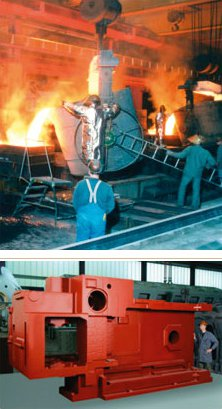
Modern foundry (c. 2000)

The final step in the process of casting usually involves grinding, sanding, or machining the component to achieve the desired dimensional accuracies, physical shape, and surface finish.

Removing the remaining gate material, called a gate stub, is usually done using a grinder or sander. These processes are used because their material removal rates are slow enough to control the amount of material being removed. These steps are done prior to any final machining.

After grinding, any surfaces that require tight dimensional control are machined. Many castings are machined in CNC milling centers. The reason for this is that these processes have better dimensional capability and repeatability than many casting processes. However, it is not uncommon today for castings to be used without machining.

A few foundries provide other services before shipping cast products to their customers. It is common to paint castings to prevent corrosion and improve visual appeal. Some foundries assemble castings into complete machines or sub-assemblies. Other foundries weld multiple castings or wrought metals together to form a finished product.

More and more, finishing processes are being performed by robotic machines, which eliminate the need for a human to physically grind or break parting lines, gating material, or feeders. Machines can reduce risk of injury to workers and lower costs for consumables – while also increasing productivity. They also limit the potential for human error and increase repeatability in the quality of grinding.

== Casting process simulation ==
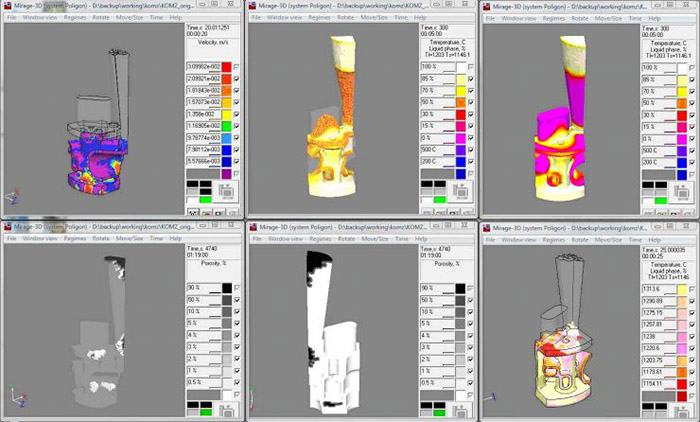
A high-performance software for the simulation of casting processes provides opportunities for an interactive or automated evaluation of results (here, for example, of mold filling and solidification, porosity and flow characteristics).

Casting processes simulation uses numerical methods to calculate cast component quality considering mold filling, solidification and cooling, and provides a quantitative prediction of casting mechanical properties, thermal stresses and distortion. Simulation accurately describes a cast component's quality up-front before production starts. The casting rigging can be designed with respect to the required component properties. This has benefits beyond a reduction in pre-production sampling, as the precise layout of the complete casting system also leads to energy, material, and tooling savings.

The software supports the user in component design, the determination of melting practice and casting methoding through to pattern and mold making, heat treatment, and finishing. This saves costs along the entire casting manufacturing route.

Casting process simulation was initially developed at universities starting from the early 1970s, mainly in Europe and in the US, and is regarded as the most important innovation in casting technology over the last 50 years. Since the late 1980s, commercial programs (such as PoligonSoft, AutoCAST and Magma) are available which make it possible for foundries to gain new insight into what is happening inside the mold or die during the casting process.

== See also ==
- Aluminium alloy inclusions
- Bellfounding
- Core (manufacturing)
- Foundry sand testing
- Ironworks
- Smelting
