= Castability =

Ease of forming a quality casting

Castability is the ease of forming a quality casting. A very castable part design is easily developed, incurs minimal tooling costs, requires minimal energy, and has few rejections. Castability can refer to a part design or a material property.

== Part design ==
Part design and geometry directly affect the castability, with volume, surface area and the number of features being the most important attributes.

If the design has undercuts or interior cavities it decreases castability due to tooling complexity. Long thin sections in a design are hard to fill. Sudden changes in wall thickness reduce castability because it induces turbulence during filling; fillets should be added to avoid this. Annulars in the path of flow should be avoided because they can cause cold shuts or misruns. A design that causes isolated hot spots decreases castability. An ideal design would have progressive directional solidification from the thinnest section to the thickest.

Location of the mold's parting line also affects castability, because a non-planar parting line also increases tooling complexity.

If a design requires a high degree of accuracy, fine surface finish or defect free surface it reduces the castability of the part. However, the casting process can be very economical for part designs that require intricate contoured surfaces, thickness variations, and internal features.

=== Quantitative analysis ===
The castability of a design can be partially quantitatively determined by the following three equations. Better castability is denoted by a larger number.

$$\frac{V_c}{V_b}$$

Where V_{c} is the volume of the casting and V_{b} is the volume of the smallest box that the casting could fit in.

$$\frac{6(V_c)^{2/3}}{A_c}$$

Where V_{c} is the volume of the casting and A_{c} is the surface area of the casting

$$\frac{1}{(1+n_f)^{0.5}}$$

Where n_{f} is the number of features (holes, pockets, slots, bosses, ribs, etc.)

== Material properties ==
Material properties that influence their castability include their pouring temperature, fluidity, solidification shrinkage, and slag/dross formation tendencies.

== See also ==
- Casting defects
