= Non-metallic inclusions =

Non-metal substances present in alloys

In metallurgy, non-metallic inclusions are chemical compounds and nonmetals that are present in steel and other alloys. They are the product of chemical reactions, physical effects, and contamination that occurs during the melting and pouring process. These inclusions are categorized by origin as either endogenous or exogenous. Endogenous inclusions, also known as indigenous, occur within the metal and are the result of chemical reactions. These products precipitate during cooling and are typically very small. Exogenous inclusions are caused by the entrapment of nonmetals. Their size varies greatly and their source can include slag, dross, flux residues, and pieces of the mold.

== Sources of inclusions formation ==
Non-metallic inclusions arise because of many physical-chemical effects that occur in molten and consolidated metal during production.

Non-metallic inclusions that arise because of different reactions during metal production are called natural or indigenous. They include oxides, sulfides, nitrides and phosphides.

Apart from natural inclusions there are also parts of slag, refractories, material of a casting mould (the material the metal contacts during production) in the metal. Such non-metallic inclusions are called foreign, accidental or exogenous.

Most inclusions in the reduction smelting of metal formed because of admixture dissolubility decreasing during cooling and consolidation.

The present-day level of steel production technology allows the elimination of most natural and foreign inclusions from the metal. However its general content in different steels can vary between wide limits and has a big influence on the metal properties.

== Classification of non-metallic inclusions ==
Non-metallic inclusions, the presence of which defines purity of steel, are classified by chemical and mineralogical content, by stability and by origin. By chemical content non-metallic inclusions are divided into the following groups:

- sulfides (simple — FeS, MnS, Al_{2}S_{3}, CaS, MgS, Zr_{2}S_{3} and others; compound — FeS·FeO, MnS·MnO and others);
- nitrides (simple — ZrN, TiN, AlN, CeN and others; compound — Nb(C, N), V(c, N) and others), which can be found in alloyed steel and has strong nitride-generative elements in its content: titanium, aluminium, vanadium, cerium and others;
- silicates
- oxides (simple — FeO, MnO, Cr_{2}O_{3}, SiO_{2}, Al_{2}O_{3}, TiO_{2} and others; compound — FeO·Fe_{2}O_{3}, FeO·Al_{2}O_{3}, FeO·Cr_{2}O_{3}, MgO·Al_{2}O_{3}, 2FeO·SiO_{2} and others;

The majority of inclusions in metals are oxides and sulfides since the content of phosphorus is very small. Silicates are very detrimental to steels, especially if it has to undergo heat treatment at a later stage.

Usually nitrides are present in special steels that contain an element with a high affinity to nitrogen.

By mineralogical content, oxygen inclusions divide into the following main groups:

- Free oxides — FeO, MnO, Cr_{2}O_{3}, SiO_{2} (quartz), Al_{2}O_{3} (corundum) and others
- Spinels — compound oxides formed by bi and trivalent elements

Ferrites, chromites and aluminates are in this group.

- silicates, which are present in steel like a glass formed with pure SiO_{2} or SiO_{2} with admixture of iron, manganese, chromium, aluminium and tungsten oxides and also crystalline silicates. Silicates are the biggest group among non-metallic inclusions. In liquid steel non-metallic inclusions are in solid or liquid condition. It depends on the melting temperature.

By stability, non-metallic inclusions are either stable or unstable. Unstable inclusions are those that dissolve in dilute acids (less than 10%concentration). Unstable inclusions are iron and manganese sulfides and also some free oxides.

Present-day levels of steel production allow to move off from the metal different inclusions. However, in general the content of inclusions in different steels varies within wide limits and has a big influence on the metal properties.

== Influence of non-metallic inclusions to the properties of steel and alloys ==
Present-day methods of steel and alloy production are unable to attain completely pure metal without any non-metallic inclusions. Inclusions are present in any steel to a greater or lesser extent according to the mixture and conditions of production. Usually the amount of non-metallic inclusions in steel is not higher than 0.1%. However, the number of inclusions in metal is very high because of their extremely small size.

Non-metallic inclusions in steel are foreign substances. They disrupt the homogeneity of structure, so their influence on the mechanical and other properties can be considerable. During deformation, which occurs from flatting, forging, and stamping, non-metallic inclusions can cause cracks and fatigue failure in steel.

When investigating the influence of non-metallic inclusions on the quality of steel, of great importance are the properties of these inclusions: size, shape, chemical and physical characteristics. All these properties depend on the chemical composition of steel, method of smelting and for certain steel grade. These properties can change within wide limits even within the same mode of production.

Different methods for analysis of non-metallic inclusions have been developed and are now in use. These make it possible to determine content, structure and amount of non-metallic inclusions in steel and alloys with high accuracy.

== See also ==
- Aluminium alloy inclusions
- Entrainment defect
- Longitudinal facial crack
