= Solidscape =

American manufacturer of 3D printers

Coordinates: 42°50′29″N 71°29′31″W

Solidscape, Inc
- Type: Private
- Industry: Computer Systems; Precision Casting; Software
- Founded: Wilton, New Hampshire (1993)
- Founder: Royden Sanders
- Headquarters: 316 Daniel Webster Highway, Merrimack, New Hampshire, USA
- Area served: Worldwide
- Key people: Alban d'Halluin; CEO; Gary Lessard; Director of Operations
- Products: 3D Printers; 3D Software; 3D Materials
- Website: www.solidscape.com

Solidscape, Inc. is a company that designs, develops and manufactures 3D printers for rapid prototyping and rapid manufacturing, able to print solid models created in CAD.

== History ==
Solidscape was founded under the name Sanders Prototype, Inc. in 1993 by Royden C. Sanders to build PC-based 3D wax printers for rapid prototyping and creating master molds used for investment casting. Sanders Prototype was originally headquartered in Wilton, New Hampshire and later moved to its current location in Merrimack, New Hampshire, USA. In early 1998, a new management team was installed, and a substantial reorganization ensued. Sanders Prototype renamed itself Solidscape, Inc. in the Fall of 2000.

The first product was the Model Maker which was a DOS-based desktop printer able to create high-resolution three-dimensional wax objects created in CAD software packages. This machine was accurate to less than 1 thousandth of an inch, allowing operators to create very small, very detailed models. The wax models could then be cast without the need of a master pattern or rubber mold.

Solidscape’s machines established themselves as a favorite among custom jewelers, who appreciated the ability to create custom designs for customers and deliver finished goods faster and more consistently than creating them by hand.

Solidscape's first machine was the Model 6 PRO. In addition to a vacuum cleaner, it shipped with a desk-size tower containing an Intel 486DX processor on a standard motherboard, a 15-inch CRT monitor and keyboard. Also installed in the PC was a proprietary interface card which interacted with the printer. The computer ran MS-DOS. The computer was required to prepare the CAD models (converting them from STL file to a proprietary format that the printer can utilize) and operate the printer. Conversion for most files required several hours to complete and printing required several more. Depending on the model to build, the whole process from file to finished output often required 24–30 hours. Most of these units were developmental models, and very few were sold. In 1997, the 6 PRO was revised to become the Modelmaker.

In 2004, Solidscape introduced the BenchTop series of 3D printers (T66BT and T612BT), a benchtop-ready solution. The BenchTop series were DOS based and did not require an external PC. The control software could run on the printer processing unit and the front-end software ModelWorks could be installed on the customer PC. Along with the BenchTop 3D printers, Solidscape launched the model-making materials InduraCast and InduraFill model-making materials.

In 2006, Solidscape introduced the higher performance BenchTop printers (T66BT2 and T612BT2).

In 2007, Solidscape introduced the benchMark series of printers (T76, R66) based on the Windows platform including touch screen functionality.

In 2009, Solidscape introduced the preXacto series of printers (D76+, D66+) dedicated to dental applications, incorporating the proprietary SCP technology and DentaCast material.

In 2010, Solidscape introduced the benchMark (T76+, R66+), incorporating the proprietary SCP technology.

In 2011, Solidscape was acquired by Stratasys, Inc (SSYS) the world market leader in 3D printing and Rapid Manufacturing systems "Wohlers Report".

In 2017, Solidscape introduced the S-series wax 3D printers. The family of printer expanded to various models including S325, S350, S360, S370, S360, S390 and S3Duo. The family leverages SCP and Solidjet technologies depending on the models

In 2018, Solidscape was acquired by Prodways Group (EPA:PWG) a major player in digital manufacturing

In 2024, Solidscape was acquired by a privately held company

== Products ==
Solidscape manufactures 3D printers, 3D materials and 3D software.

- 3D Printers receive digital input from three-dimensional data files (STL, SLC) and create solid, three-dimensional wax master patterns through an additive, layer-by-layer process with a layer thickness [mm] from .0127 to.0762 and a resolution of [dpi] 5,000 × 5,000 × 8,000 XYZ. Build envelope of [cm] 15.2W × 15.2D × 10.1H. The machine footprint is [cm] 54.9W × 49.0D × 40.9H.
- 3D Materials are non-toxic thermoplastic materials featuring lost wax casting properties: fast melt out, no ash or residue, no thermal expansion.
- 3D Software are designed to process 3D open source files (.STL,.SLC), set up the printer's resolution as well as control the motion algorithms.

== Technology ==
- Vector Printing : The proprietary printing technology in which 2 jets, build and support, move in both directions (x and y) simultaneously while depositing droplets on the build plate.
  "A Vector is a curve which is defined by two endpoints and a radius of curvature. This vector is consistently recreated by linking these three data-points and drawing the line". Vectored jetting is guided by the same principle. A start point, endpoint and radius of curvature is defined by the control software and the jet follows this path. With rasterized jetting, each point on the curve is strictly defined, so to make a complete curve, the print-head must move to each specifically defined spot, deposit material and move on. By its very nature, it must move, then stop, then move again. By utilizing a vectored path, the print-heads need not stop each time it deposits material onto the build area which results in smoother features.
- SCP (Smooth Curvature Printing) : trademark for Vector-Jetting algorithm based on motion control technology allowing to deliver continuous and smooth curves
- Solidjet: A high volume jetting technology allowing to increase print speed for vector printing
- DoD printing (Drop on Demand) : trademark for 3D printing technology whereby 6000-12000 droplets of a wax-like material are deposited onto a build plate to create 3D models.
- DWax (Dewaxing) : the proprietary technology to remove the support material from the built model. It employs a liquid solution that at the target temperature dissolves the support material.

== Applications ==
- Production of wax master patterns for mold making and investment casting applications.
- Production of small parts and assemblies that require high precision and castability.
- Applications such as jewelry and watch-making, personal consumer electronics, toys, automotive, aerospace, bio-medical, and dental restorations.

== See also ==
- Direct digital manufacturing
- Rapid prototyping
- 3D printing
- Desktop manufacturing
- Lost-wax casting
