= Hydrogen gas porosity =

Hydrogen gas porosity is an aluminium casting defect in the form of a porosity or void in an aluminium casting caused by a high level of hydrogen gas (H_{2}) dissolved in the aluminium at liquid phase. The solubility of hydrogen in solid aluminium is much smaller than in liquid aluminium. As the aluminium freezes, some of the hydrogen comes out of solution and forms bubbles, creating porosity in the solid aluminium.

Aluminium foundries want to produce high-quality aluminum castings with minimum porosity. Hydrogen porosity can be reduced by reducing the amount of hydrogen in the liquid aluminium alloy, by degassing or sparging. (Sometimes a small hydrogen concentration is intentionally maintained; some very fine hydrogen porosity can be preferable to internal voids caused by shrinkage.) Directional solidification can drive impurities to one end of the casting.

== The hydrogen problem ==
Hydrogen forms whenever molten aluminium comes into contact with water vapor, and easily dissolves into the melt. The gas tends to come out of the solution and forms bubbles when the melt solidifies.

The detrimental effects arising from the presence of an excess of dissolved hydrogen in aluminium are numerous. Hydrogen causes porosity in aluminum products leading to many casting defects, reduced mechanical properties like fatigue and lower corrosion resistance. Several methods are used to reduce the amount of dissolved hydrogen from the melt, such as furnace fluxing prior to the casting process or using in-line degassing equipment during the casting process.

== Direct hydrogen measurement ==
An on-line method of measuring hydrogen in aluminum is then required to characterize and optimize the process, which helps ensure the quality of outgoing products and monitors the performance of these degassing processes. Traditional laboratory methods, such as hot extraction, are too expensive for routine quality assurance, and too slow for effective process control. The Reduced Pressure Test (RPT) is often used on the foundry floor. The RPT is a semi-quantitative method with limited accuracy that provides an indication of the hydrogen level.

=== Hydrogen analyzer ===
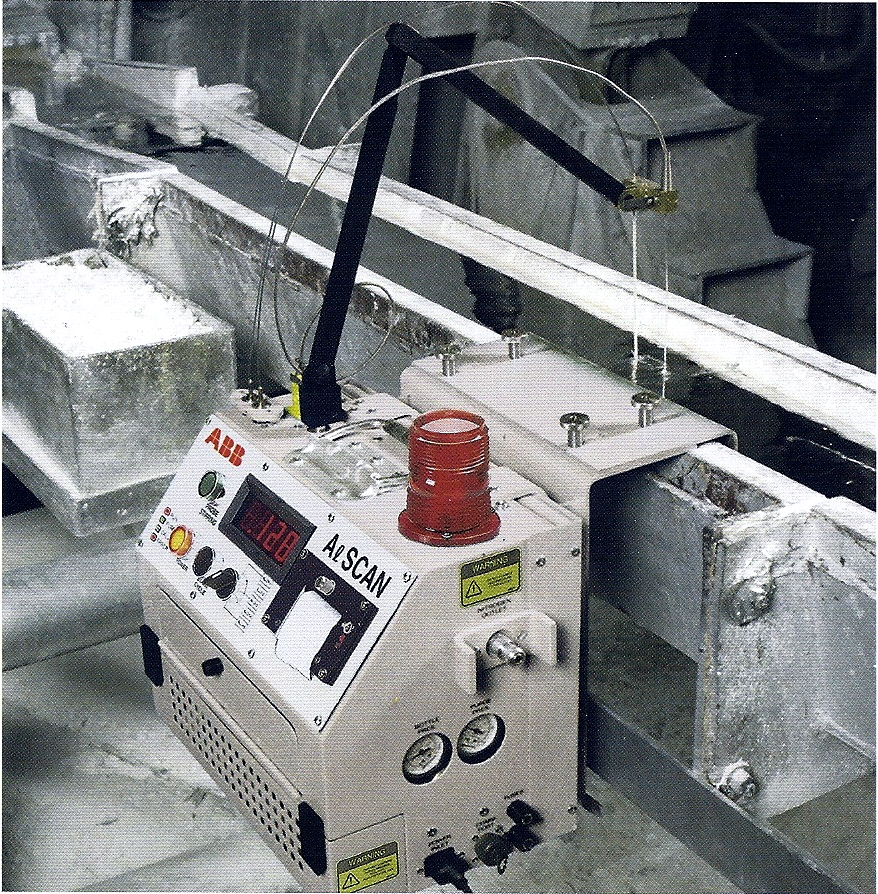
Hydrogen Gas Analyser

A hydrogen analyzer can be used for direct measurement of hydrogen in liquid aluminium. Direct monitoring of hydrogen is possible using an on-line quantitative measurement technology based on a closed-loop gas recirculation method though a porous ceramic probe.

Since its introduction in 1989, this gas recirculation method has been increasingly used by major aluminum producers.

An example of analyzer for direct hydrogen measurement in liquid aluminium is the Accurity. It works with a probe immersed in liquid aluminium and it uses the closed-loop recirculation method.

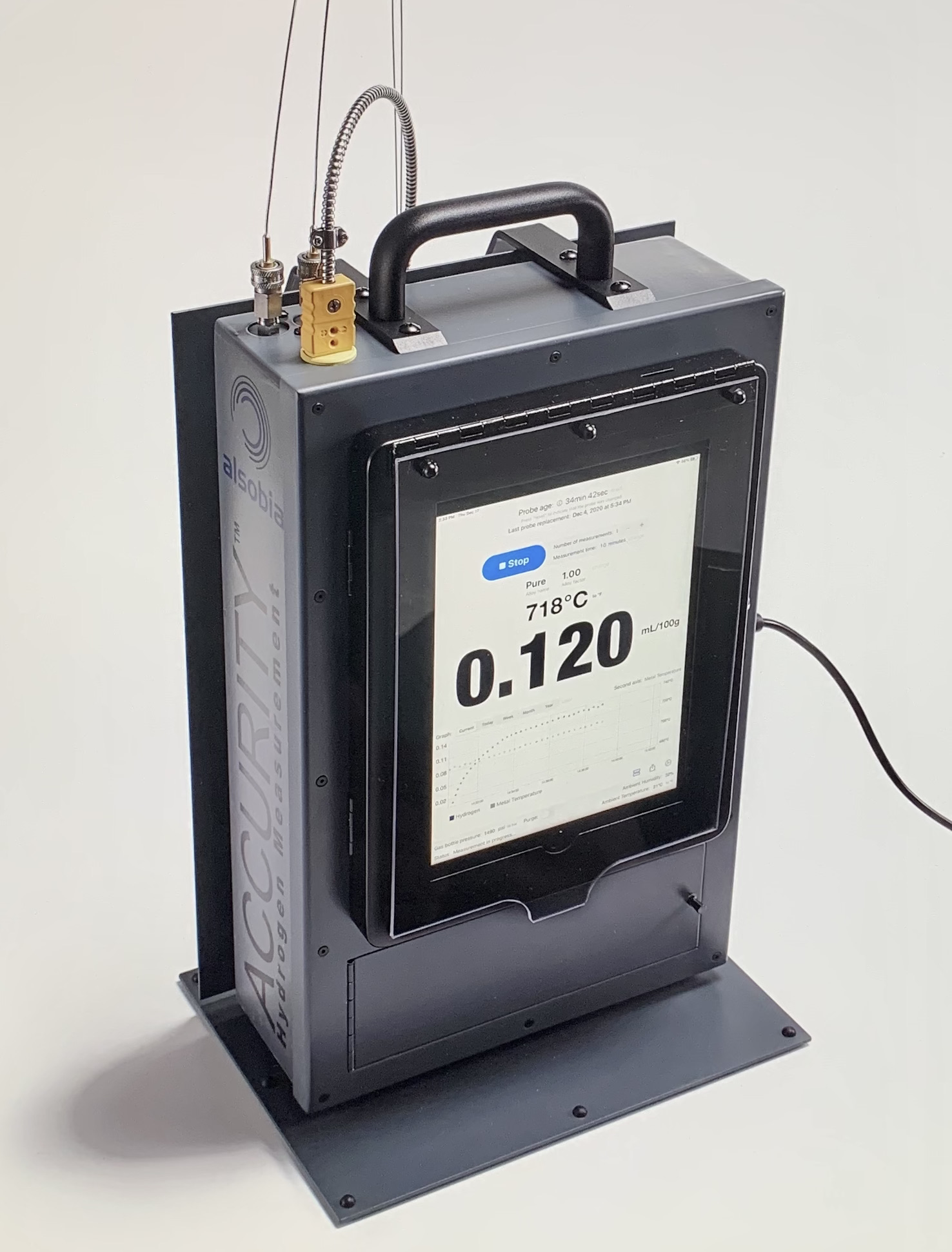
Accurity Hydrogen Measurement in Liquid Aluminium

=== Operation principle ===
The closed loop recirculation is a proven method of directly monitoring hydrogen in molten aluminium. A small volume of carrier gas, usually nitrogen, is brought in contact with the melt by means of an immersed probe, and is continuously recirculated in the closed loop until its hydrogen content reaches equilibrium with the vapor pressure of H_{2} in the melt. The H_{2} concentration in the gas is measured and converted into a reading of the gas concentration in the metal. This method is fast, reproducible, and accurate, and can be used online on the factory floor.

The amount of H_{2} in the gas loop of the instrument is determined by a thermal conductivity sensor, which provides high reproducibility and a broad measurement range.
