= Porosity sealing =

Step in the metal casting process

Porosity sealing is done through the process of vacuum impregnation. Vacuum impregnation is a preferred OEM process that seals porosity and leak paths in metal castings, sintered metal parts and electrical castings that form during the casting or molding process. Vacuum impregnation stops casting porosity (a phenomenon that occurs in the die-cast manufacturing process and allows manufacturers to use parts that would otherwise be scrapped.)

Porosity occurs naturally and is found in most materials. In metal castings, porosity is typically considered any void found in the casting. Casting porosity can be caused by gas formation or solidification while the metal is being moved from a liquid state to a solid state. This porosity can range in size, from sub-micron to voids greater than 10 mm, depending on the casting.

Casting defects caused by porosity can affect the part’s structural integrity, creating a failure point. Porosity can also prevent the part from being pressure tight. This will impact performance if the part is designed to hold gases or fluids.

== Process Standards ==
Vacuum impregnation is governed by Military Standard MIL-I-17563C and MIL-STD-276A as well as numerous proprietary and customer specifications. MIL-I-17563 tests the impregnation sealant. MIL-I-17563C demonstrates a sealant is compatible with the application and that the sealant will not degrade or fail over the life of the part. MIL-STD-276A tests the impregnation process. MIL-STD-276A provides the standards for processing to seal parts and testing process effectiveness.

== Process ==
The vacuum impregnation process seals internal leak paths to make it leak free and suitable for use. In the course of sealing castings against porosity, the parts would be processed through the following four stations:

1. Impregnation Chamber: The operator would seal the chamber and draw a vacuum. This would remove air in the porosity and leak path in the casting wall. Parts would then be covered with sealant, and positive pressure applied. More energy would be required to penetrate the porosity with sealant than to evacuate the air. The operator would then release the pressure and drain the chamber.
2. Excess Sealant Recovery: The operator would remove excess sealant through gravity, rotation or centrifugal force.
3. Wash/Rinse Station: The operator would wash residual sealant from the part's internal passages, taps, pockets and features.
4. Cure Station: The operator would polymerize the impregnated sealant in the leak path.

Vacuum impregnation should be done prior to final assembly. Specifically for metal castings, vacuum impregnation should be done after final machining. Final machining may expose any porosity, creating a leak path. These paths can cause fluids and gases to leak from the casting, causing it to be non-conforming and unusable.

== Common Applications ==
Porosity is inherent to most manufacturing processes. Porosity is only considered a defect if it is interconnected and creates a leak path can affect the part's structural integrity and performance. Vacuum impregnation seals porosity and leak paths for the following reasons.

=== Seal Leak Paths ===
This is the main reason why vacuum impregnation is used on any material-die cast, powder metal, plastic, wire harnesses. Vacuum impregnation prevents fluids or gases from leaking by sealing the porosity and leak paths. If the leak paths are not sealed, then fluids or gases may leak from the part.

=== Improve Machinability ===
Impregnation is used to improve machinability on powder metallurgy. Secondary machine operations, such as drilling, tapping, or cutting, are only marginally successful because voids between the particles cause tool chatter, reducing tool life and finish quality. Vacuum impregnation stabilizes and supports the individual powdered metal granules during machining. Vacuum impregnation improves machinability by making it more efficient, eliminating tool chatter, and improving the machined finish.

=== Prohibit Corrosion ===
Plating operations submerge the parts in acid solutions. The residual acid can seep into the porosity, which causes corrosion. Sealing the components before plating eliminates corrosion.

=== Enhance Secondary Finishing ===
The porosity may absorb oils, fluids, deburring fluids, pre-plating cleaners, and acids. If not sealed, then any gases or fluids may affect the finish by outgassing or bleeding out. Sealing the leak paths before secondary finishes will eliminate any failure mode that could develop from outgassing, chemical compatibility, or bleed out of pretreatments.

=== Improve Part Integrity ===
Vacuum impregnation can be used to part the integrity of additive manufacturing parts. An additive manufacturing part is not as dense — and thus not as strong — as a part made from traditional manufacturing processes. Vacuum impregnation can be used to strengthen the material. As the vacuum impregnation sealant cures within the perforations, it creates a bond between the part layers. This enhances the part by increasing density.

== Common Materials ==
=== Additive Manufacturing ===
Parts created through the additive manufacturing process are susceptible to the same porosity that plagues those created through more traditional methods. The porosity is inherent to the properties of the material and technology. The two primary materials that vacuum impregnation seals are plastic and sintered metal.

=== Die Castings ===
Die castings and permanent mold castings commonly contain internal porosity. This porosity is generally localized to the deepest cross-sections of the part and does not extend to the outer skin. However, if the part is also machined, the internal porosity will be exposed and the part will leak if pressurized. Machined die castings that need to hold fluids (intake manifolds, coolant connectors, transmission cases, pump housings and fluid power components) are routinely sealed for life using acrylic resins. Because the sealant is internal to the part, the exterior dimensions and appearance of the part are unchanged.

=== Electronics ===
In these parts, metal pins and wires are embedded in the plastic housing. When the parts experience heat during manufacturing or normal use, the plastic and metal expand at different rates. This expansion creates microscopic voids between the materials. While these leak paths are unavoidable, they can cause a field failure if not sealed.

=== Powder metallurgy ===
Powder metallurgy (PM) components are sealed for four main reasons.

The first is that PM parts are sealed to prevent fluids or gases from leaking under pressure. PM applications for compressed air, fuel handling or hydraulic housings are common and effective; however, they must be sealed first. If not sealed, then fluids or gases will leak from the part. Sealing the parts will not change the component's dimensional or functional characteristics.

PM parts are sealed prior to plating and to reduce internal corrosion. Plating operations typically involve submerging the parts in acid solutions. After plating, residual acid internal to the part can promote corrosion and/or preclude an acceptable plating finish. The solution to this problem is to seal the internal voids prior to plating. As explained above, the porosity is saturated with monomer and is then rinsed completely clear of the surface. The resin cures to a durable polymer. Thus, the exposed surface metal is free to be plated while the interior spaces are sealed dry.

Powder metal is also impregnated to enhance maintainability. PM parts are generally difficult to machine and some compositions may not be machinable without ruining the cutting tool. Secondary machine operations, such as drilling, tapping, or cutting, are impaired as the voids between the particles cause tool chatter, reducing tool life and degrading the finish quality. Vacuum impregnation stabilizes and supports the individual powdered metal granules during machining. This improves machinability by making it more efficient, eliminating tool chatter, and improving the machined finish.

Powder metal porosity absorbs oils, fluids, deburring fluids, pre-plating cleaners, and acids. If the porosity is not sealed, fluids may bleed out and negatively affect the finish. Sealing the porosity before secondary finishes will eliminate any failure mode that could develop from bleed out of pretreatments.
