= Entrainment defect =

Metal casting defect; intrusion of oxide layer into bulk liquid

In metallurgy, an entrainment defect is a term used to describe a defect created in a casting by the folding-over of the oxidized surface layer of the molten metal into the bulk liquid.

Outside of special cases, the surface of a molten metal is covered with a thin, solid layer of oxide. If the surface of the liquid happens to fold in on itself, or if a separate droplet falls into it, there will be a solid-on-solid interface between the two films. This can happen as a consequence of any kind of turbulence during the processing of the molten metal. Once solidified, this interface becomes functionally indistinguishable from a crack.

The presence of such crack-like entrainment in solid metal articles constitutes a metalworking defect. The continuous casting process used in the initial forming of most wrought alloys is also susceptible to entrainment. Any entrainment defects thus formed are inherited by the wrought products.

When the entrainment is initially formed, it contains some amount of trapped air. This pocket of air, however, will be chemically consumed over time. The oxygen in this pocket of air will be used up by further thickening of the oxide layer. The nitrogen may then be converted into nitrides, although this process depends on which metal it happens in.

When liquid metal is subjected to high pressure, as during die casting, liquid metal may be forced through the oxide film. This phenomenon is able to partially bond the two facing oxide surfaces, thus reducing the severity of the defect.

== See also ==
- Non-metallic inclusions
