= Directional solidification =

Types of solidification within castings

Directional solidification

Progressive solidification

Directional solidification (DS) and progressive solidification are types of solidification within castings. Directional solidification is solidification that occurs from farthest end of the casting and works its way towards the sprue. Progressive solidification, also known as parallel solidification, is solidification that starts at the walls of the casting and progresses perpendicularly from that surface.

== Theory - ==
Most metals and alloys shrink as the material changes from a liquid state to a solid state. Therefore, if liquid material is not available to compensate for this shrinkage a shrinkage defect forms. When progressive solidification dominates over directional solidification a shrinkage defect will form.

The geometrical shape of the mold cavity has a direct effect on progressive and directional solidification. At the end of tunnel-type geometries, divergent heat flow occurs, which causes that area of the casting to cool faster than surrounding areas; this is called an end effect. Large cavities do not cool as quickly as surrounding areas because there is less heat flow; this is called a riser effect. Also note that corners can create divergent or convergent (also known as hot spots) heat flow areas.

Directional solidification can be induced using chills, risers, insulating sleeves, and control over pouring rate and pouring temperature.

Directional solidification is widely used in the aerospace and power generation industries to manufacture turbine blades for jet engines and industrial gas turbines. The aligned columnar grain structure provides improved creep resistance and thermal fatigue life compared to conventionally cast components.

Directional solidification can be used as a purification process. Since most impurities will be more soluble in the liquid than in the solid phase during solidification, impurities will be "pushed" by the solidification front, causing much of the finished casting to have a lower concentration of impurities than the feedstock material, while the last solidified metal will be enriched with impurities. This last part of the metal can be scrapped or recycled. The suitability of directional solidification in removing a specific impurity from a certain metal depends on the partition coefficient of the impurity in the metal in question, as described by the Scheil equation. Directional solidification (in zone melting) is frequently employed as a purification step in the production of multicrystalline silicon for solar cells.

== Microstructural Effects ==
Directional solidification is the preferred technique for casting high temperature nickel-based superalloys that are used in turbine engines of aircraft. Some microstructural problems such as coarse dendritic structure, long dendrite side branches, and porosity hinder the full potential of single crystal ni-based alloys. This morphology can be understood by looking at the G/V ratio of a solidification where G is the temperature gradient in the melt ahead of the solidifying front and V is the rate of solidification. This ratio must be maintained within a range to ensure single crystal formation with the correct microstructure of the coarse dendrite with side branches. It has been found that increasing the solidification cooling rate further improves the mechanical properties and rupture life of single crystals grown by directional solidification due to refinement of the y’ precipitates.

In directional solidification growths of single crystals, spurious grains nucleate when molten metal flowed into a gap between the mold/seed gap and solidified. This is catastrophic to mechanical properties of Ni-based superalloys such as CMSX4, and can be minimized by keeping the tolerance of <001> from the local surface normal. Additionally, the range of axial orientations in the directional solidification starting block should be minimized in order to successfully grow a single crystal. This is difficult depending on the range of orientations in the DS starter block, and therefore makes orientation control a large area of focus.

In Ti-Al base alloys, the lamellar microstructure exhibits anisotropic properties in the lamellar direction and therefore the kinetics and orientation of its growth are integral to optimizing its mechanical properties. Selecting a directional solidification growth where the lamellar structure is parallel to the growth direction will result in a high strength and ductility. It is even more difficult to precipitate this phase since it is not formed from the liquid and instead from the solid state. The first way to overcome this challenge is by using a seed material, which is properly oriented and that nucleates new lamellae during processing with the same orientation as the original material. It is placed in front of the main bulk of material so that when the melt is solidifying it has a precedent for the correct orientation to follow. If a seed is not used, the other method of achieving the high strength single lamellar phase is to have the lamellar structure oriented along the growth direction. However, this is only successful for a small window of the solidification, as its success from the columnar growth of the beta phase followed by the equiaxed growth of the alpha phase and alloying with boron is compromised by the high thermal gradient of the cooling.

== High-temperature mechanical properties ==
The high-temperature mechanical properties of directionally solidified nickel-based superalloys depend on the orientation of the applied load relative to the solidification direction. Columnar-grained material contains elongated grains aligned approximately along the growth direction. Longitudinal loading acts parallel to this direction, whereas transverse loading acts perpendicular to it. Differences in properties between these orientations are described as anisotropy. For components operating under sustained loads at elevated temperature, this directional dependence affects both deformation and failure. Longitudinal and transverse behavior must therefore be distinguished when evaluating creep performance.

Experiments at 850 °C under applied stresses of 320–500 MPa demonstrated substantial differences between the two loading directions in a directionally solidified nickel-based superalloy. Longitudinal specimens exhibited lower steady-state creep rates, longer rupture lives, and greater elongation before fracture than transverse specimens. Increasing stress accelerated deformation and reduced rupture life in both orientations. At 320 MPa, the initial creep rates were similar during approximately the first 100 hours, but transverse specimens subsequently entered accelerating creep earlier. These observations show that orientation can affect different stages of the creep process, rather than simply producing a constant difference in deformation rate.

The same investigation identified differences in deformation mechanisms. Observations using electron microscopy indicated more uniformly distributed deformation in longitudinal specimens, whereas transverse specimens exhibited localized deformation. The authors associated these differences with the activation of different slip systems and the interaction of dislocations with strengthening γ′ precipitates. Consequently, the observed anisotropy cannot be explained exclusively by the orientation of grain boundaries; crystallographic deformation mechanisms and the evolution of the strengthening microstructure also contribute.

Creep rate and rupture life do not necessarily rank loading orientations in the same order. A study of directionally solidified IC10 alloy at 980 °C, using stresses of 110–180 MPa, found lower minimum creep rates in transverse specimens despite their shorter rupture lives. The authors related this behavior to their lower capacity for elongation before fracture. A material can therefore accumulate strain relatively slowly yet fail sooner because it tolerates less deformation. Assessments based only on minimum creep rate may overlook this distinction. Temperature, stress, and the chosen performance measure must be specified when comparing loading orientations.

The surrounding environment can also influence orientation-dependent failure. Experiments on directionally solidified Mar-M200+Hf at 750, 900, and 1100 °C found shorter transverse rupture lives than longitudinal or compositionally equivalent single-crystal specimens. Transverse failure was associated with reduced creep ductility and fracture along grain boundaries. Oxidation assisted this intergranular fracture at 900 and 1100 °C. Observations of local deformation identified crack development at high-angle boundaries and between grains undergoing substantial creep deformation. These results connect the grain structure produced during solidification to subsequent damage during service.

These effects matter for turbine blades and guide vanes, whose complex geometry can expose some regions to stresses perpendicular to the growth direction. Evaluating transverse properties alongside longitudinal properties helps characterize the limitations of the material under such loading conditions.

comparison of loading-direction effects on creep
Material	Temperature	Reported orientation effect	Source
Mar-M200+Hf	750, 900, 1100 ˚C	Transverse specimens had shorter rupture lives; oxidation assisted intergranular fracture at 900 and 1100 °C	
Nickel-based alloy investigated by Long et al.	850 ˚C	Longitudinal specimens had lower steady-state creep rates and longer rupture lives	
IC10	980 ˚C	Transverse specimens had lower minimum creep rates but shorter rupture lives	
