= Aluminium dross recycling =

Aluminium dross

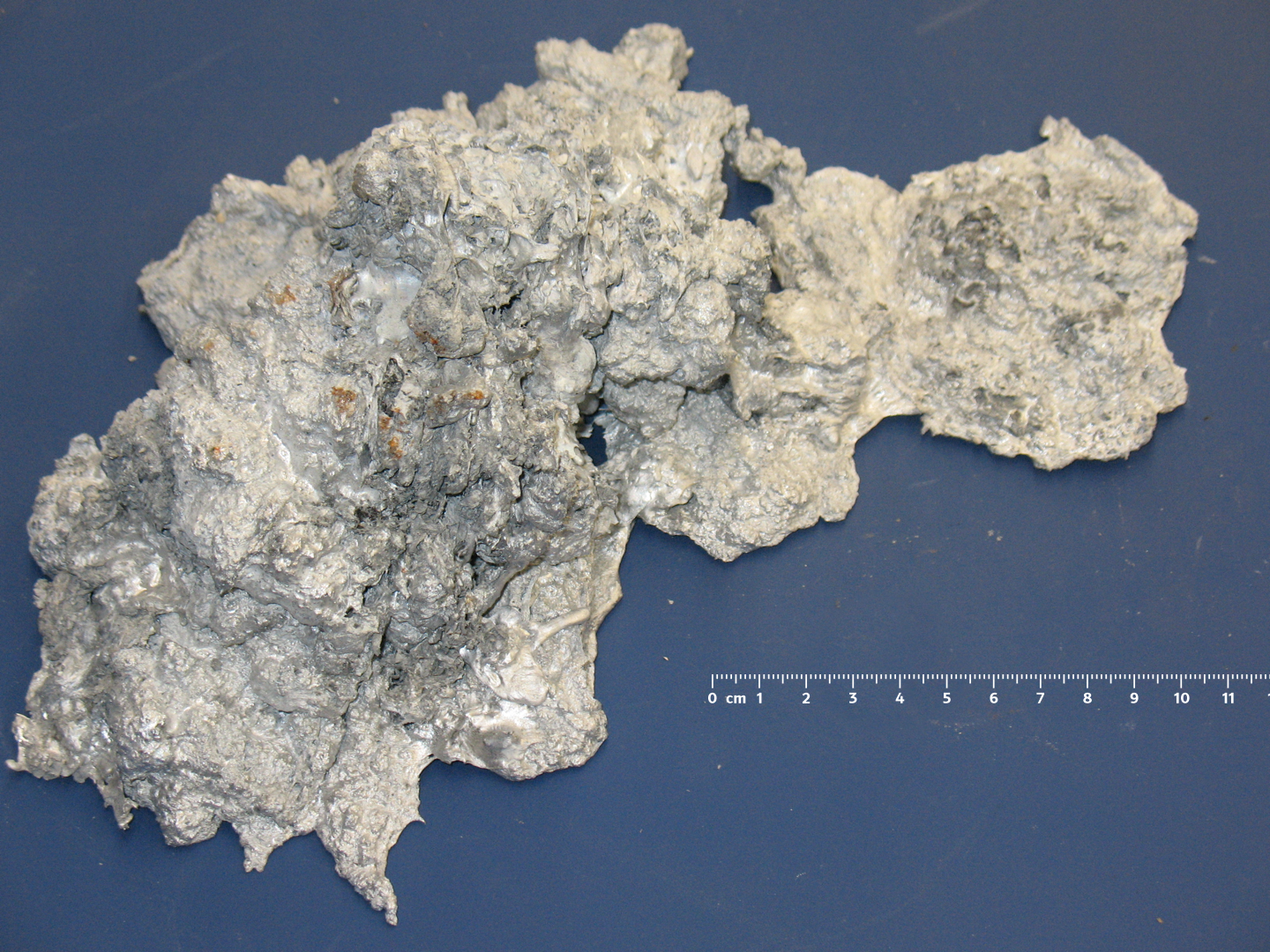
Aluminium dross

Aluminium dross, a byproduct of the aluminium smelting process, can be mechanically recycled to separate the residual aluminium metal from the aluminium oxide.

== Thermo-mechanical metal extraction ==
The mechanical process of recycling does not use any toxic chemicals previously used in the process of extracting the valuable aluminium in the dross.

Hot dross processing is a system whereby the majority of metal is recovered without chemically reducing the aluminium oxides. The dross is first crushed then separated into aluminium rich particles and aluminium oxide rich particles based on density. The metal rich particles are then melted in a furnace to remove the remaining oxide particles.

== Mechanical extraction vs chemical ==
The recovery of aluminium from dross has traditionally caused severe environmental issue with highly alkaline waste waters, a waste product that is rich in waste flux and that evolves ammonia gas on contact with water and can spontaneously combust if allowed to get wet A novel method developed in New Zealand claims to be an environmentally sensitive method, non-toxic, and different from previous methods which resulted in a concentrated highly toxic salt cake residue.

== Products made with aluminum dross ==
A variety of products can be made from the residual aluminium dross after it is recycled into aluminium oxide. See more information on aluminium oxide. Aluminium oxide has a variety of industrial uses which includes being used in paint, dye, concrete, explosives, and fertilizer.

== Difference from dross recycling ==
Aluminium dross recycling is a completely different process to strictly aluminium recycling. Aluminium recycling is where pure aluminium products (previously used in another form) are re-melted into aluminium ingots and then re-used to new aluminium products. While aluminium dross recycling is where the dross, a byproduct of the smelting process in the creation of aluminium from bauxite, can be mechanically recycled thus separating the residual aluminium from the aluminium oxide.
