= Sprue (manufacturing) =

Channel through which liquid material enters a mold

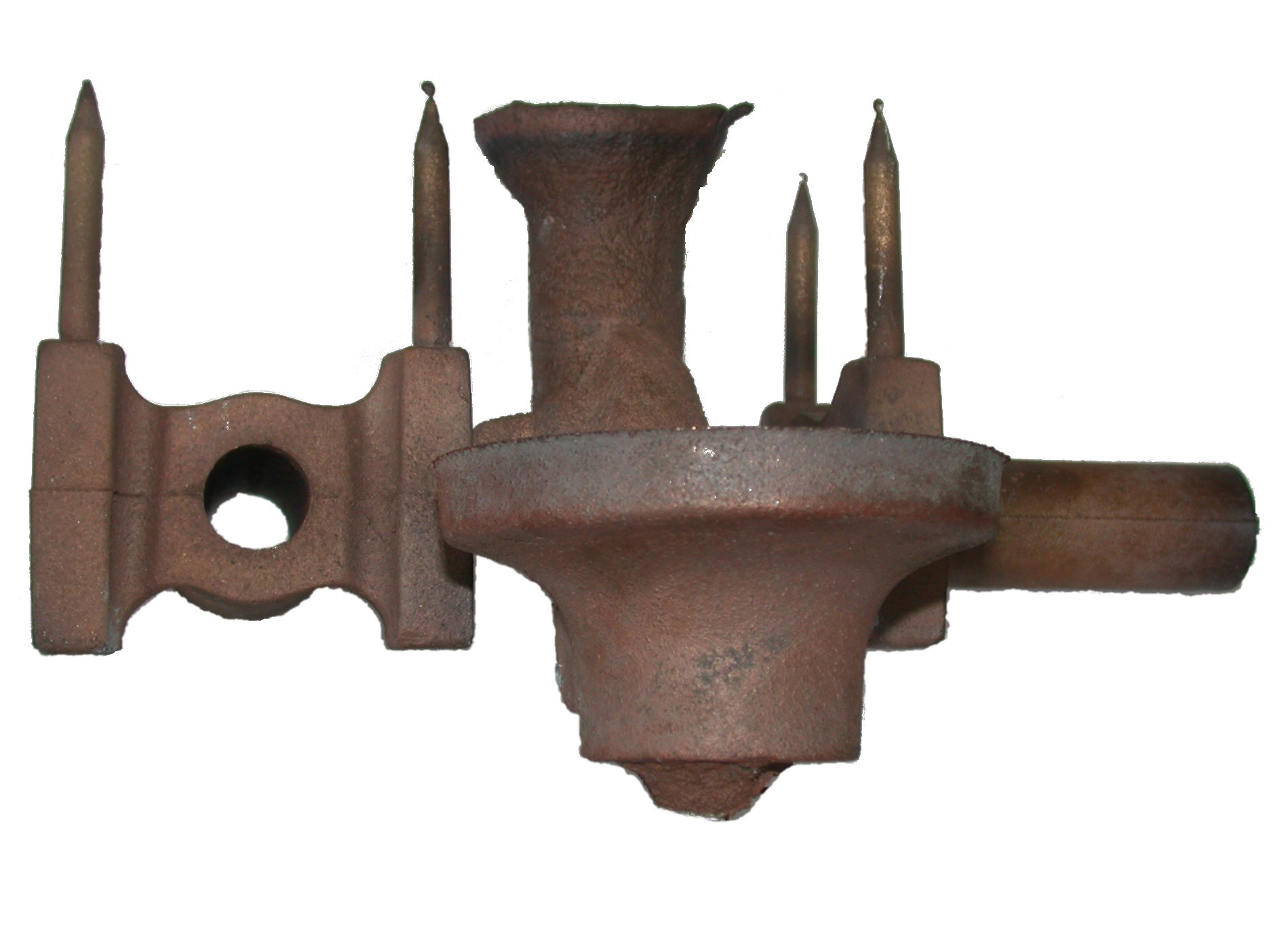
Bronze casting showing sprue and risers

A sprue is a large diameter vertical channel through which liquid material is introduced into a mold. It connects the pouring basin to the runner. In many cases it controls the flow of material into the mold. During casting or molding, the material in the sprue will solidify and need to be removed from the finished part. It is usually tapered downwards to minimize turbulence and formation of air bubbles.

== Casting ==
In casting, a sprue is the passage through which a molten material is introduced into a mold, and the term also refers to the excess material which solidifies in the sprue passage.

=== Function ===
Sprues can serve as filters, as heat sinks, and as feeders. Bronze, in particular, has a high shrinkage rate as it is cooling. A sprue is tapered with its bigger end at the top to receive the liquid metal, the smaller end is connected to the runner.

=== Sprue design ===
The design of the sprue gating and runner is also essential for casting. The design can incorporate either bottom or vertical gating.

For bottom gating:

$$t_f = \frac {2 A_m(\sqrt {h_t}-\sqrt {h_t-h_m})} {A_g \sqrt{2g}}$$

where:

$t_f$ = Time for filling

$A_m$ = Area of mold

$A_g$ = Area of gate

$g$ = Acceleration due to gravity

$h_t$ = Total height

$h_m$ = Height of mold cavity

This equation may change if the height of gating is equal to height of casting material.

Then the equation will be:

$$t_f = \frac {2 A_m\sqrt {h_t-(h_t-h_m)}} {A_g \sqrt {2g}}$$

or, simplified,

$$t_f = \frac {2 A_m\sqrt {h_m}} {A_g \sqrt {2g}}$$

where:

$t_f$ = Time for filling

$A_m$ = Area of mold

$A_g$ = Area of gate

$g$ = Acceleration due to gravity

$h_t$ = Total height (Height of gating + height of mold cavity)

$h_m$ = Height of mold cavity

== Injection molding ==
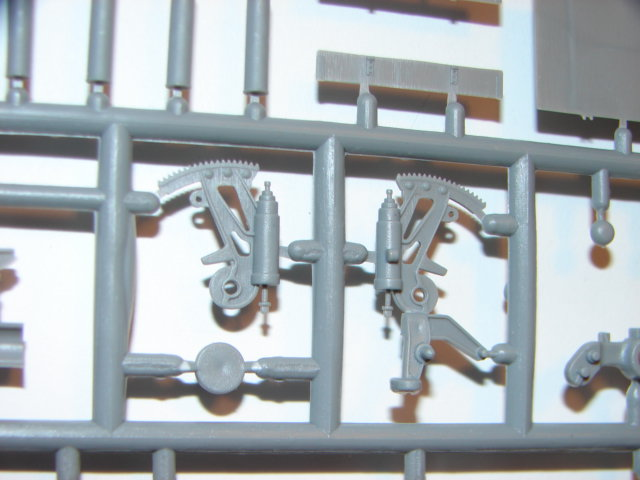
Plastic sprue

In injection molding, sprue refers to the passage through which a liquid material (such as polystyrene or polyvinyl chloride) flows into a die, where the material solidifies to form parts. Sprue also refers to the material that solidifies in these passages, forming a framework that attaches the parts in a roughly planar arrangement.

=== Sprues, runners, and gates ===
Some moldmakers distinguish the sprue, the gate, and the runner. The sprue is a large-diameter channel through which plastic flows, usually around the edges of the part or along straight lines. The runner is a smaller channel from the sprue to the individual part. An analogy may be found in a water system that employs a water main (sprue) and smaller pipes (runners) to individual houses. The gate is the location at which the molten plastic enters the mold cavity and is often evidenced by a small nub or projection (the "gate mark") on the molded piece.

Many scale-model kits are made from injection-molded plastic. Hobbyists typically remove the parts of a model kit from the runner using a sharp craft knife or razor saw. The sprues usually form a rectangle with the runners and parts inside which makes them easier to box.

Model makers sometimes use sprues or runners as raw material to fabricate additional parts, such as railings on model ships, antenna wires on airplanes, or greebles on fictional spacecraft.

Sprues in model kits often include engravings to identify the parts by number.

== See also ==
- Chvorinov's rule
