= Chvorinov's rule =

Concept in applied physics

Chvorinov's rule is a physical relationship that relates the solidification time for a simple casting to the volume and surface area of the casting. It was first expressed by Czech engineer Nicolas Chvorinov in 1940.

== Description ==
According to the rule, a casting with a larger surface area and smaller volume will cool more quickly than a casting with a smaller surface area and a larger volume under otherwise comparable conditions. The relationship can be mathematically expressed as:

$$t = B \left( \frac{V}{A} \right)^n$$

Where t is the solidification time, V is the volume of the casting, A is the surface area of the casting that contacts the mold, n is a constant, and B is the mold constant.

This relationship can be expressed more simply as:

$$t = BM^n$$

Where the modulus M is the ratio of the casting's volume to its surface area:

$$M = \frac{V}{A}$$

The mold constant B depends on the properties of the metal, such as density, heat capacity, heat of fusion and superheat, and the mold, such as initial temperature, density, thermal conductivity, heat capacity and wall thickness.

=== Mold Constant ===
The S.I. unit for the mold constant B is seconds per metre squared (s/m^{2}). According to Askeland, the constant n is usually 2, however Degarmo claims it is between 1.5 and 2. The mold constant B can be calculated using the following formula:

$$B = \left[ \frac{\rho_\mathrm{m} L}{\left(T _\mathrm{m} - T_0\right)} \right ]^2 \left[ \frac{\pi}{4k\rho c} \right] \left[ 1 + \left(\frac{c_\mathrm{m}\Delta T_\mathrm{s}}{L} \right)^2 \right],$$

Where

T_{m} = melting or freezing temperature of the liquid (in kelvins),
T_{0} = initial temperature of the mold (in kelvins),
ΔT_{s} = T_{pour} − T_{m} = superheat (in kelvins),
L = latent heat of fusion (in [J·kg^{−1}]),
k = thermal conductivity of the mold (in [W·m^{−1}·K^{−1})]),
ρ = density of the mold (in [kg·m^{−3}]),
c = specific heat of the mold (in [J·kg^{−1}·K^{−1}]),
ρ_{m} = density of the metal (in [kg·m^{−3}]),
c_{m} = specific heat of the metal (in [J·kg^{−1}·K^{−1}]).

It is most useful in determining if a riser will solidify before the casting, because if the riser solidifies first then defects like shrinkage or porosity can form.
