= Sparging (chemistry) =

Method using bubbling a gas through liquid

In chemistry, sparging, also known as gas flushing in metallurgy, is a technique in which a gas is bubbled through a liquid in order to remove other dissolved gas(es) and/or dissolved volatile liquid(s) from that liquid. It is a method of degassing. According to Henry's law, the concentration of each gas in a liquid is proportional to the partial pressure of that gas (in the gaseous state) in contact with the liquid. Sparging introduces a gas that has little or no partial pressure of the gas(es) to be removed, and increases the area of the gas-liquid interface, which encourages some of the dissolved gas(es) to diffuse into the sparging gas before the sparging gas escapes from the liquid. Many sparging processes, such as solvent removal, use air as the sparging gas. To remove oxygen, or for sensitive solutions or reactive molten metals, a chemically inert gas such as nitrogen, argon, or helium is used.

== Liquid chromatography ==
Solvents used in high-performance liquid chromatography (HPLC) are often sparged with helium.

== Engineering ==
In biochemical engineering, sparging can remove low-boiling liquids from a solution. The low-boiling components evaporate more rapidly, so the gas bubbles remove more of them from the bulk solution containing higher-boiling components. It is an alternative to distillation, and it does not require heat.

== Environmental chemistry ==
In environmental chemistry, air sparging is an in situ remediation technique that removes volatile pollutants from contaminated groundwater and soil.

== Metallurgy ==
In metallurgy, gas flushing removes dissolved gases from the molten metal prior to the material being processed. For example, before casting aluminium alloys, argon bubbles are injected into liquid aluminium using a rotary degasser. The argon bubbles rise to the surface, bringing with them some of the dissolved hydrogen. The degassing step reduces the occurrence of hydrogen gas porosity. In the steel making process, this method is used very commonly for duplex steel and some high reactivity metals.

== See also ==
- Froth flotation, the use of gas bubbles to separate or extract hydrophobic liquids and/or solids from hydrophilic liquids
