= Riser (casting) =

Reservoir in a manufacturing mold

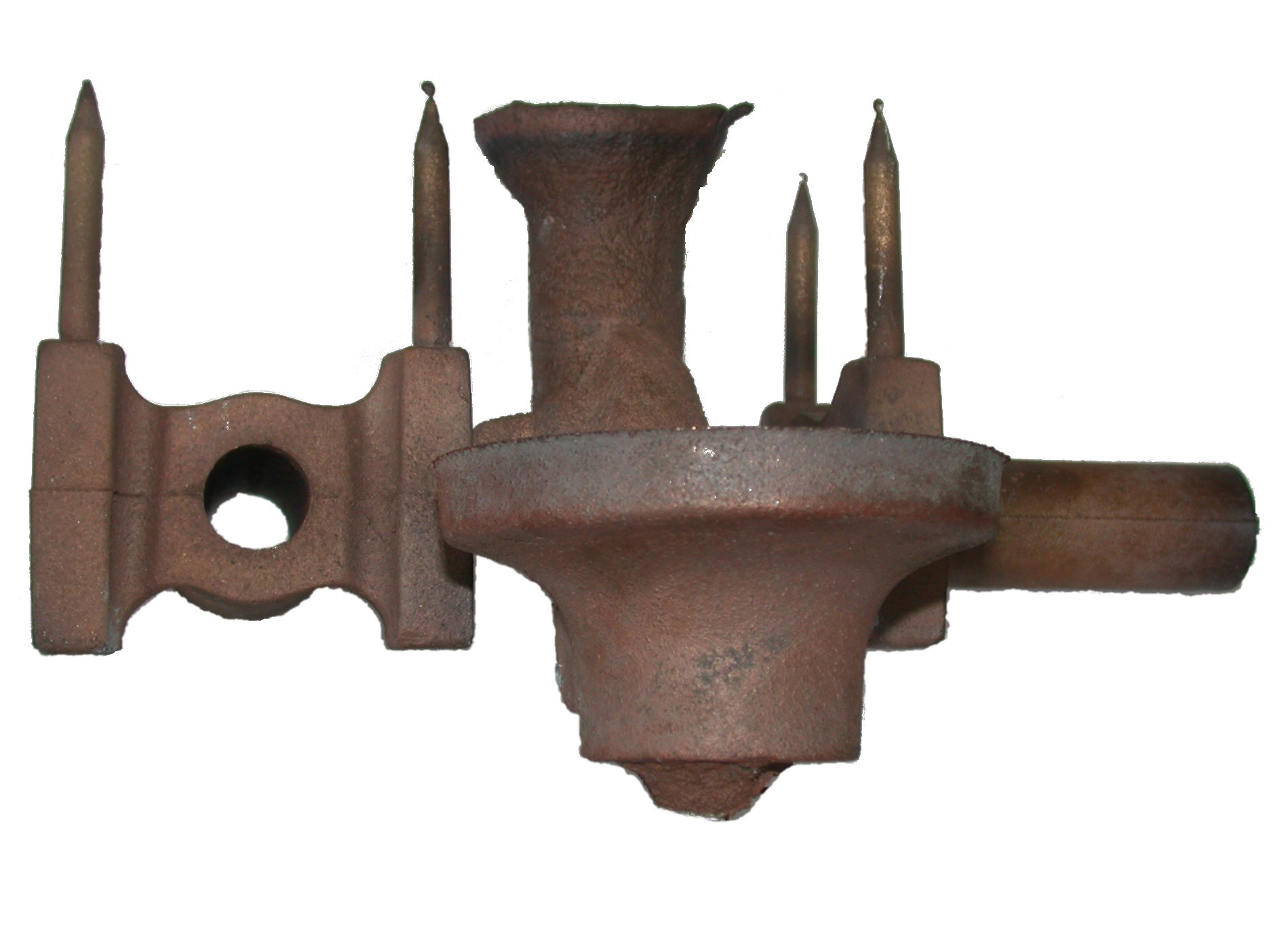
A bronze casting showing the sprue and risers

A riser, also known as a feeder, is a reservoir built into a metal casting mold to prevent cavities due to shrinkage. Most metals are less dense as a liquid than as a solid so castings shrink upon cooling, which can leave a void at the last point to solidify. Risers prevent this by providing molten metal to the casting as it solidifies, so that the cavity forms in the riser and not the casting. Risers are not effective on materials that have a large freezing range, because directional solidification is not possible. They are also not needed for casting processes that utilized pressure to fill the mold cavity.

== Theory ==
Risers are only effective if three conditions are met: the riser cools after the casting, the riser has enough material to compensate for the casting shrinkage, and the casting directionally solidifies towards the riser.

For the riser to cool after the casting, the riser must cool more slowly than the casting. Chvorinov's rule briefly states that the slowest cooling time is achieved with the greatest volume and the least surface area; geometrically speaking, this is a sphere. So, ideally, a riser should be a sphere, but this isn't a very practical shape to insert into a mold, so a cylinder is used instead. The height to diameter ratio of the cylinder varies depending on the material, location of the riser, size of the flask, etc.

The shrinkage must be calculated for the casting to confirm that there is enough material in the riser to compensate for the shrinkage. If it appears there is not enough material then the size of the riser must be increased.

The casting must be designed to produce directional solidification, which sweeps from the extremities of the mold cavity toward the riser(s). Thus, the riser can feed molten metal continuously to part of the casting that is solidifying. One method to achieve this is by placing the riser near the thickest and largest part of the casting, as that part of the casting will cool and solidify last. If this type of solidification is not possible, multiple risers that feed various sections of the casting or chills may be necessary.

== Types ==
Different types of risers

A riser is categorized based on three criteria: where it is located, whether it is open to the atmosphere, and how it is filled. If the riser is located on the casting then it is known as a top riser, but if it is located next to the casting it is known as a side riser. Top risers are advantageous because they take up less space in the flask than a side riser, plus they have a shorter feeding distance. If the riser is open to the atmosphere it is known as an open riser, but if the riser is completely contained in the mold it is known as a blind riser. An open riser is usually bigger than a blind because the open riser loses more heat to mold through the top of the riser. Finally, if the riser receives material from the gating system and fills before the mold cavity it is known as a live riser or hot riser. If the riser fills with material that has already flowed through the mold cavity it is known as a dead riser or cold riser. Live risers are usually smaller than dead risers. Top risers are almost always dead risers and risers in the gating system are almost always live risers.

The connection of the riser to the molding cavity can be an issue for side risers. On one hand the connection should be as small as possible to make separation as easy as possible, but, on the other, the connection must be big enough for it to not solidify before the riser. The connection is usually made short to take advantage of the heat of both the riser and the molding cavity, which will keep it hot throughout the process.

There are risering aids that can be implemented to slow the cooling of a riser or decrease its size. One is using an insulating sleeve and top around the riser. Another is placing a heater around only the riser.

=== Hot tops ===
A hot top, also known as a feeder head, is a specialized riser, used to help counteract the formation of pipes when casting ingots. It is essentially a live open riser, with a hot ceramic liner instead of just the mold materials. It is inserted into the top of the ingot mould near the end of the pour, and the rest of the metal is then poured. Its purpose is to maintain a reservoir of molten metal, which drains down to fill the pipe as the casting cools. The hot top was invented by Robert Forester Mushet who named it a Dozzle. With a hot top only 1 to 2% of the ingot goes to waste, prior to its use, up to 25% of the ingot was wasted.

== Yield ==
The efficiency, or yield, of a casting is defined as the weight of the casting divided by the weight of the total amount of metal poured. Risers can add a lot to the total weight being poured, so it is important to optimize their size and shape. Risers exist only to ensure the integrity of the casting, they are removed after the part has cooled, and their metal is remelted to be used again; as a result, riser size, number, and placement should be carefully planned to reduce waste while filling all the shrinkage in the casting.

One way to calculate the minimum size of a riser is to use Chvorinov's rule by setting the solidification time for the riser to be longer than that of the casting. Any time can be chosen but 25% longer is usually a safe choice, which is written as follows:

$$t_{\text{riser}} = 1.25t_{\text{casting}}$$

or

$$\left( \frac{V}{A} \right)^n_\text{riser} = 1.25\left( \frac{V}{A} \right)^n_\text{casting}$$

Because all of the mold and material factors are the same for n. If a cylinder is chosen for the geometry of the riser and the height to diameter ratio is locked, then the equation can be solved for a diameter, which makes this method a simple way to calculate the minimum size for a riser. Note that if a top riser is used the surface area that is shared between the riser and the casting should be subtracted from the area on the casting and the riser.
