= Thermo-mechanical fatigue =

Thermo-mechanical fatigue (short TMF) is the overlay of a cyclical mechanical loading, that leads to fatigue of a material, with a cyclical thermal loading. Thermo-mechanical fatigue is an important point that needs to be considered, when constructing turbine engines or gas turbines.

== Failure mechanisms ==
There are three mechanisms acting in thermo-mechanical fatigue

- Creep is the flow of material at high temperatures
- Fatigue is crack growth and propagation due to repeated loading
- Oxidation is a change in the chemical composition of the material due to environmental factors. The oxidized material is more brittle and prone to crack creation.

Each factor has more or less of an effect depending on the parameters of loading. In phase (IP) thermo-mechanical loading (when the temperature and load increase at the same time) is dominated by creep. The combination of high temperature and high stress is the ideal condition for creep. The heated material flows more easily in tension, but cools and stiffens under compression. Out of phase (OP) thermo-mechanical loading is dominated by the effects of oxidation and fatigue. Oxidation weakens the surface of the material, creating flaws and seeds for crack propagation. As the crack propagates, the newly exposed crack surface then oxidizes, weakening the material further and enabling the crack to extend. A third case occurs in OP TMF loading when the stress difference is much greater than the temperature difference. Fatigue alone is the driving cause of failure in this case, causing the material to fail before oxidation can have much of an effect.

TMF still is not fully understood. There are many different models to attempt to predict the behavior and life of materials undergoing TMF loading. The two models presented below take different approaches.

== Models ==
There are many different models that have been developed in an attempt to understand and explain TMF. This page will address the two broadest approaches, constitutive and phenomenological models. Constitutive models utilize the current understanding of the microstructure of materials and failure mechanisms. These models tend to be more complex, as they try to incorporate everything we know about how the materials fail. These types of models are becoming more popular recently as improved imaging technology has allowed for a better understanding of failure mechanisms. Phenomenological models are based purely on the observed behavior of materials. They treat the exact mechanism of failure as a sort of "black box". Temperature and loading conditions are input, and the result is the fatigue life. These models try to fit some equation to match the trends found between different inputs and outputs.

=== Damage accumulation model ===
The damage accumulation model is a constitutive model of TMF. It adds together the damage from the three failure mechanisms of fatigue, creep, and oxidation.

$\frac {1} {N_f} = \frac {1} {N_f^{fatigue}} + \frac {1} {N_f^{oxidation}} + \frac {1} {N_f^{creep}}$

where $N_f$ is the fatigue life of the material, that is, the number of loading cycles until failure. The fatigue life for each failure mechanism is calculated individually and combined to find the total fatigue life of the specimen.

==== Fatigue ====
The life from fatigue is calculated for isothermal loading conditions. It is dominated by the strain applied to the specimen.

$\frac {\Delta \epsilon_m} {2} = C(2N_f^{fatigue})^d$

where $C$ and $d$ are material constants found through isothermal testing. Note that this term does not account for temperature effects. The effects of temperature are treated in the oxidation and creep terms.

==== Oxidation ====
The life from oxidation is affected by temperature and cycle time.

$\frac {1} {N_f^{oxidation}} = \left(\frac {h_{cr}\delta_0} {B\Phi^{oxidation}K_p^{eff}}\right)^{\frac {-1} {\beta}} \frac {2(\Delta \dot{\epsilon_m})^{\frac {2} {\beta} +1}} {\epsilon^{1-\alpha / \beta}}$

where $K_p^{eff} = \frac {1} {t_c} \int_0^t D_0 exp \left(\frac {-Q} {RT(t)} \right) dt$

and $\Phi^{oxidation} = \frac {1} {t_c} \int_0^t exp \left[-\frac {1} {2} \left(\frac{(\dot{\epsilon_{th}} / \dot{\epsilon_m}) + 1} {\dot{\zeta}^{oxidation}} \right)^2 \right] dt$

Parameters are found by comparing fatigue tests done in air and in an environment with no oxygen (vacuum or argon). Under these testing conditions, it has been found that the effects of oxidation can reduce the fatigue life of a specimen by a whole order of magnitude. Higher temperatures greatly increase the amount of damage from environmental factors.

==== Creep ====
$D^{creep} = \Phi^{creep} \int_0^t Ae^{(-\Delta H/RT(t))} \left(\frac {\alpha_1 \bar{\sigma} + \alpha_2 \sigma_H} {K} \right)^m dt$

where $\Phi^{creep} = \frac {1} {t_c} \int_0^t exp \left[ -\frac {1}{2} \left( \frac {(\dot{\epsilon_{th}}/ \dot{\epsilon_m})-1} {\dot{\zeta}^{creep}} \right)^2 \right] dt$

==== Benefit ====
The damage accumulation model is one of the most in-depth and accurate models for TMF. It accounts for the effects of each failure mechanism.

==== Drawback ====
The damage accumulation model is also one of the most complex models for TMF. There are several material parameters that must be found through extensive testing.

=== Strain-rate partitioning ===
Strain-rate partitioning is a phenomenological model of thermo-mechanical fatigue. It is based on observed phenomenon instead of the failure mechanisms. This model deals only with inelastic strain and ignores elastic strain completely. It accounts for different types of deformation and breaks strain into four possible scenarios:

- PP – plastic in tension and compression
- CP – creep in tension and plastic in compression
- PC – plastic in tension and creep in compression
- CC – creep in tension and compression

The damage and life for each partition is calculated and combined in the model

$\frac {1} {N_f} = \frac {F_{pp}} {N'_{pp}} + \frac {F_{cc}} {N'_{cc}} + \frac {F_{pc}} {N'_{pc}} + \frac {F_{cp}} {N'_{cp}}$

where $F_{pp}=\frac {\Delta \epsilon_{pp}} {\Delta \epsilon_{inelastic}}, F_{cc}=\frac {\Delta \epsilon_{cc}} {\Delta \epsilon_{inelastic}}, F_{pc}=\frac {\Delta \epsilon_{pc}} {\Delta \epsilon_{inelastic}}, F_{cp}=\frac {\Delta \epsilon_{cp}} {\Delta \epsilon_{inelastic}}$

and $N'_{pp}$ etc., are found from variations of the equation $\Delta \epsilon_{inelastic} = A_{pp}(N'_{pp})^{C_{pp}}$

where A and C are material constants for individual loading.

==== Benefit ====
Strain-Rate Partitioning is a much simpler model than the damage accumulation model. Because it breaks down the loading into specific scenarios, it can account for different phases in loading.

==== Drawback ====
The model is based on inelastic strain. This means that it does not work well with scenarios of low inelastic strain, such as brittle materials or loading with very low strain. This model can be an oversimplification. Because it fails to account for oxidation damage, it may overpredict specimen life in certain loading conditions.

== Looking forward ==
The next area of research is attempting to understand TMF of composites. The interaction between the different materials adds another layer of complexity. Zhang and Wang are currently investigating the TMF of a unidirectional fiber reinforced matrix. They are using a finite element method that accounts for the known microstructure. They have discovered that the large difference in the thermal expansion coefficient between the matrix and the fiber is the driving cause of failure, causing high internal stress.
