= Undercut (manufacturing) =

Special type of recessed surface

In manufacturing, an undercut is a special type of recessed surface that is inaccessible using a straight tool. In turning, it refers to a recess in a diameter generally on the inside diameter of the part. In milling, it refers to a feature which is not visible when the part is viewed from the spindle. In molding, it refers to a feature that cannot be molded using only a single pull mold. In printed circuit board construction, it refers to the portion of the copper that is etched away under the photoresist.

== Turning ==
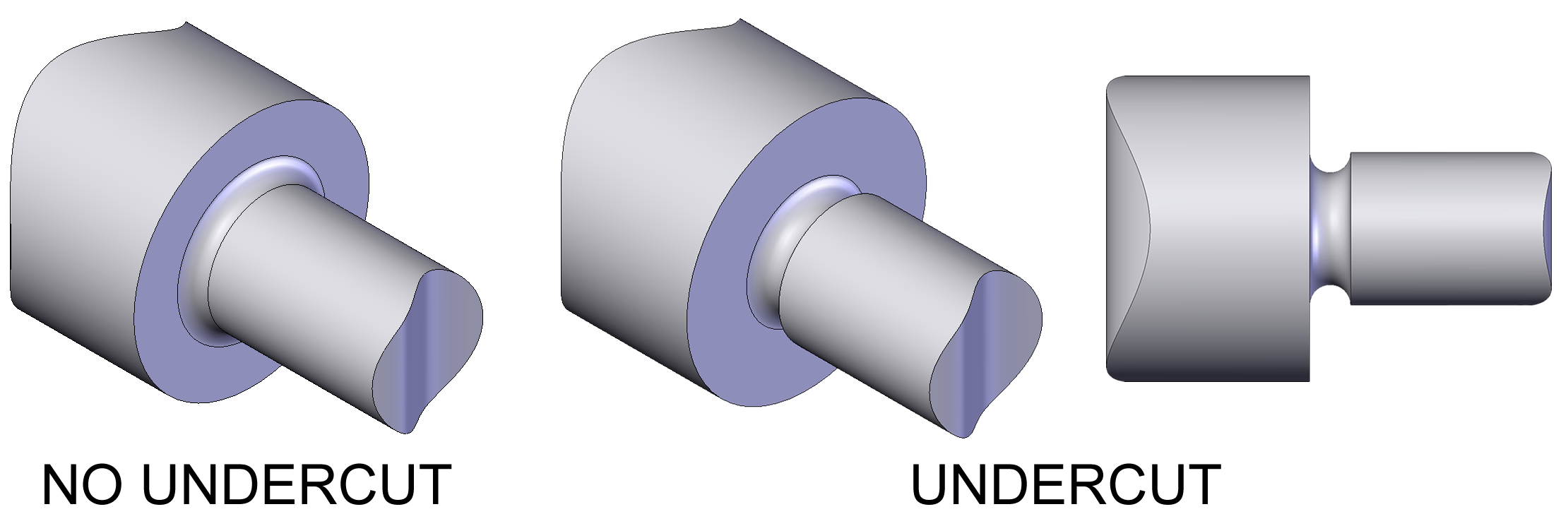
An example of a turned part with and without an undercut

On turned parts an undercut is also known as a neck or "relief groove". They are often used at the end of the threaded portion of a shaft or screw to provide clearance for the cutting tool.

== Molding ==
A simple example of molding an external undercut

Undercut - Any indentation or protrusion in a shape that will prevent its withdrawal from a one-piece mold.

== Milling ==
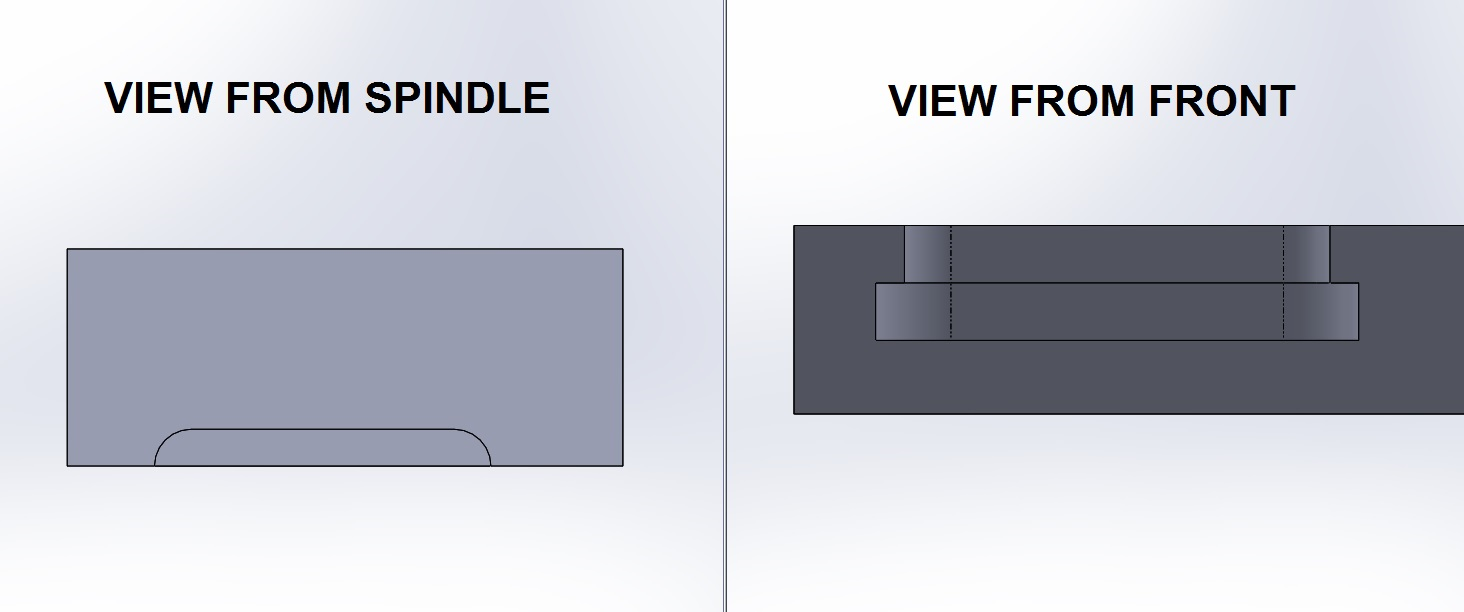
Top and Front view of a milled undercut slot

In milling the spindle is where a cutting tool is mounted. In some situations material must be cut from a direction where the feature can not be seen from the perspective of the spindle and requires special tooling to reach behind the visible material.

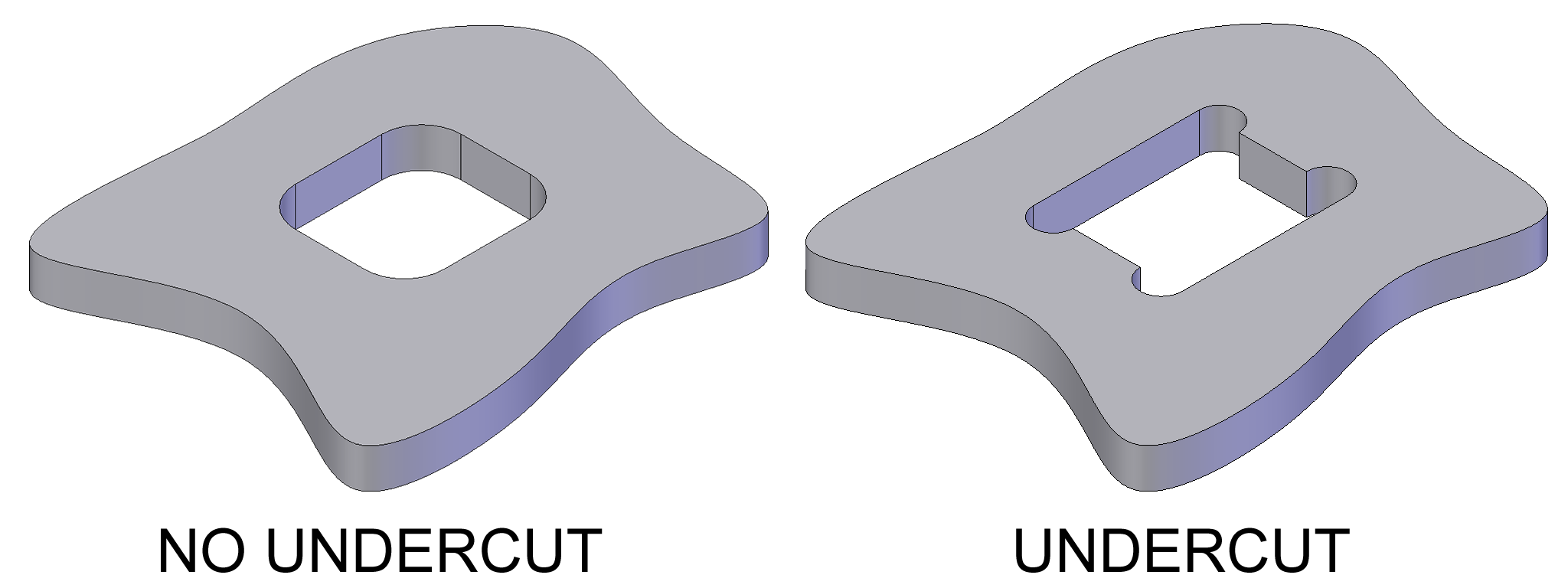
An example of a machining undercut

The corners may be undercut to remove the radius that is usually left by the milling cutter this is commonly referred to as a relief.

== Etching ==
Undercuts from etching (microfabrication) are a side effect, not an intentional feature.
