= Aluminium alloy inclusions =

Usually non-metallic particle present in liquid aluminum alloy

In metallurgy, an inclusion is a solid particle in liquid aluminium alloy. It is usually non-metallic and can be of different nature depending on its source.

== Problems related to inclusions ==
Inclusions can create problems in the casting when they are large and in too high concentration. Here are examples of problems related to inclusions:

- Pinholes in light gauge foil
- Flange cracks in beverage containers
- Surface streaks in bright automotive trim and lithographic material
- Breakage in wire drawing operation
- Increased tool wear and tear
- Increased porosity
- Loss of pressure tightness of engine blocks
- Poor machinability
- Cosmetic defect in apparent surfaces
- Diminished mechanical properties (e.g. Ultimate Tensile Strength, Yield Strength, Elongation)

== Inclusion types ==
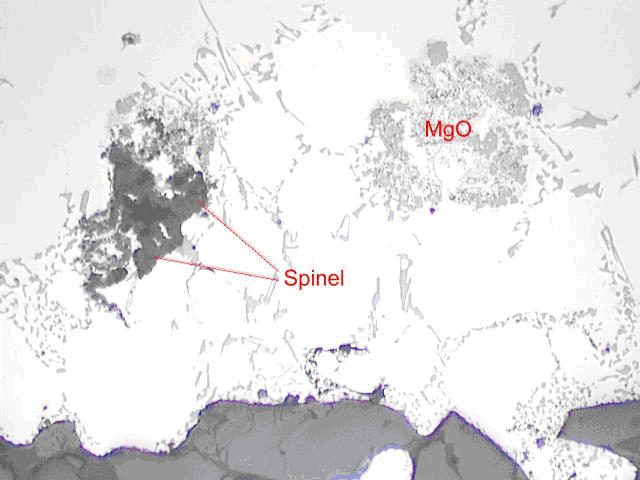
Spinel and magnesium oxide inclusions as seen under microscope from a PoDFA sample

=== Oxide films ===
In contact with ambient air, liquid aluminium reacts with the oxygen and form an oxide film layer (gamma-Al_{2}O_{3}). This layer becomes thicker with time. When molten aluminium is disturbed, this oxide film gets mixed inside the melt.

=== Aluminium carbide ===
In primary aluminium production, aluminium carbides (Al_{4}C_{3}) originates from the reduction of alumina where carbon anodes and cathodes are in contact with the mix. Later in the process, any carbon tools in contact with the liquid aluminium can react and create carbides.

=== Magnesium oxides ===
In aluminium alloys containing magnesium, magnesium oxides (MgO), cuboids (MgAl_{2}O_{4}-cuboid) and metallurgical spinel (MgAl_{2}O_{4}-spinel) can form. They result from the reaction between magnesium and oxygen in the melt. More of them will form with time and temperature.

Spinel can be highly detrimental because of its big size and high hardness.

=== Refractory materials ===
Particles of refractory material in contact with aluminium can detach and become inclusions. We can find graphite inclusions (C), alumina inclusions (alpha-Al_{2}O_{3}), CaO, SiO_{2}, …

After some time, graphite refractory in contact with aluminium will react to create aluminum carbides (harder and more detrimental inclusions).

In aluminium alloy containing magnesium, the magnesium reacts with some refractories to create rather big and hard inclusions similar to spinels.

Unreacted refractory particles can originate from the degradation of refractory materials which comes in contact with the melt.

=== Chlorides ===
Chloride inclusions (MgCl_{2}, NaCl, CaCl_{2}, …) are a special type of inclusion as they are liquid in liquid metal. When aluminium solidifies, they form spherical voids similar to hydrogen gas porosity but the void contains a chloride crystal formed when aluminium became colder.

=== Fluxing salt ===
Fluxing salt, like chlorides are also liquid inclusions. They come from flux treatments added to the melt for cleaning.

=== Intentionally added inclusions ===
Titanium boride (TiB_{2}) is intentionally added to the melt for grain refinement to improve mechanical properties.

Phosphorus is added to the melt hypereutectic alloys for modification of the silicon phase for better mechanical properties. This creates AlP inclusions.

Boron treatment inclusions ( (Ti, V)B_{2} ) form when boron is added to the melt to increase conductivity by precipitating vanadium and titanium.

=== Less frequently found inclusions ===
The following inclusion types can also be found in aluminium alloys: alumina needles (Al_{2}O_{3}), nitrides (AlN), iron oxides (FeO), manganese oxides (MnO), fluorides (Na_{3}AlF_{6}, NaF, CaF_{2}, …), aluminium borides (AlB_{2}, AlB_{12}), borocarbides (Al_{4}C_{4}B).

Bone ash (Ca_{3}(PO_{4})_{2}) sometimes added to patch cracks in the trough can be found as inclusions in the melt.

== Inclusion measurement ==
Several methods exist to measure the inclusion content in liquid aluminium. The most common methods are PoDFA, Prefil, K-Mold and LiMCA. Measuring the inclusions is of great help to understand the impact of furnace preparation, alloying practice, feedstock mix, settling time, and similar parameters on melt cleanliness.

=== PoDFA ===
The PoDFA method provides information on the composition and concentration of the inclusions in molten aluminum. PoDFA is widely used for process characterization and optimization, as well as product improvement. It allows to quickly and accurately assess the effects of various operating practices on metal cleanliness or identify filtration efficiency.

The PoDFA method was developed by Rio Tinto Alcan in the 70s. The metallographic analysis method has been optimized for over the years on a wide variety of alloys.

The measurement principle is the following: A predetermined quantity of liquid aluminum is filtered under controlled conditions using a very fine porosity filter. Inclusions in the melt are concentrated at the filter surface by a factor of about 10,000. The filter, along with the residual metal, is then cut, mounted and polished before being analyzed under an optical microscope by a trained PoDFA metallographer.

=== Prefil ===
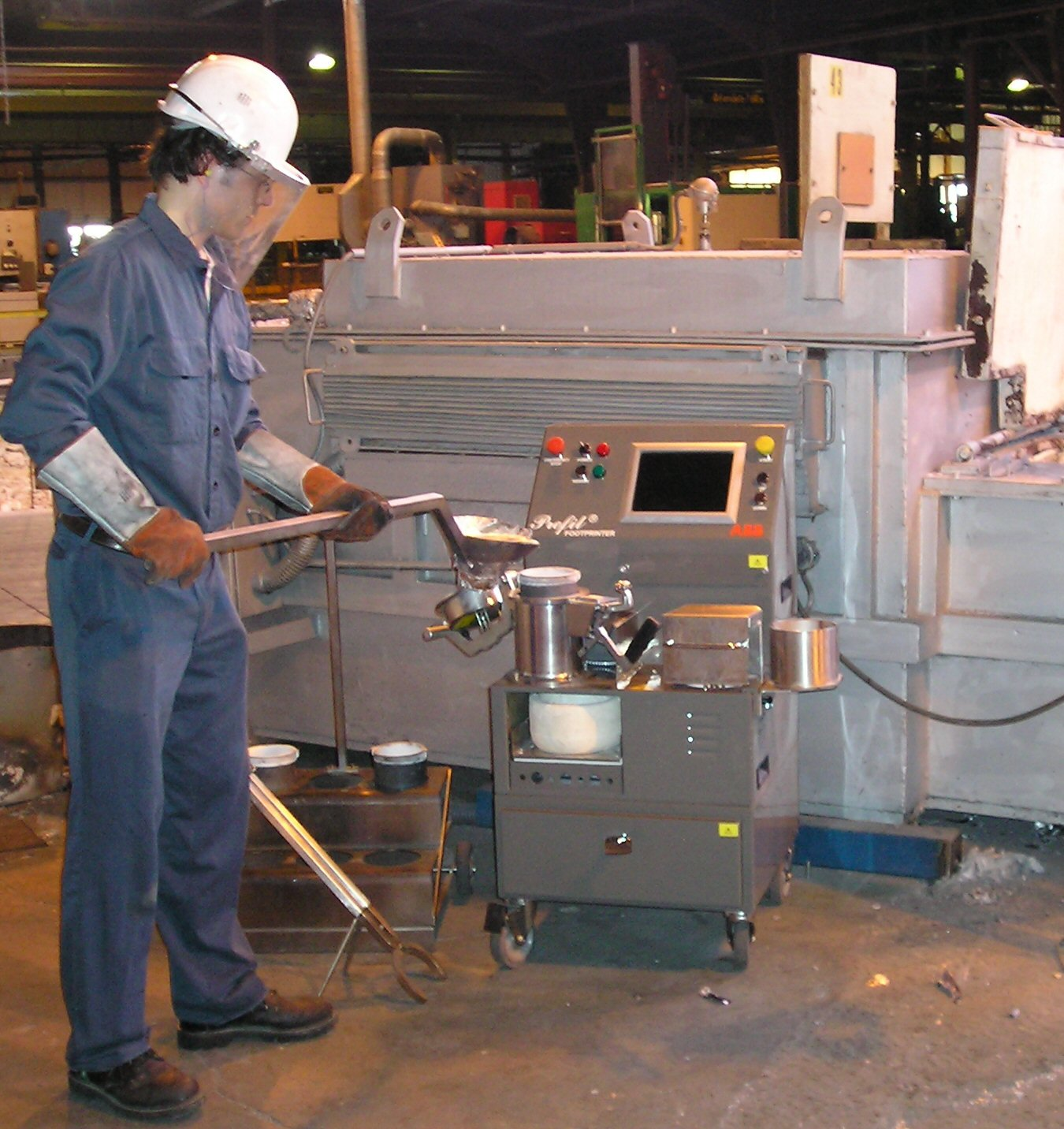
Pressure Filtration Melt Cleanliness Analyzer: Prefil-Footprinter for inclusion measurement in liquid aluminium

The Prefil method is similar to PoDFA but, in addition to the metallographic analysis, Prefil provides also an immediate feedback on metal cleanliness from the metal flowrate through the filter. Because everything about the filtration is well controlled (pressure, metal temperature, ...), the only parameter affecting the filtration speed is the inclusion content. One can determine the cleanliness level from the filtration curve (weight of metal filtered as a function of time).

=== K-Mold ===
K-Mold is a fracture test method. Liquid metal is cast into a mold containing notches. Once solidified, the resulting bar is bent to expose a fracture surface. The visual observation of inclusions on the fracture is used to determine a K-value for the melt and compared to a preset standard. This method is rather imprecise and therefore only suitable when metal contains large inclusions and inclusion clusters.

=== LiMCA ===
The LiMCA method measures the total concentration and size distribution of inclusions present in aluminum alloys. Its measuring principle is based on an objective and user-independent method. The LiMCA CM system can characterize the cleanliness of a melt at time intervals in the order of one minute. It can therefore monitor, in real-time, the evolution of cleanliness along a cast as a function of process parameters and melt-handling practices.

The heart of the LiMCA measuring system consists of a closed glass tube (electrically insulating material) bearing a small orifice at its bottom. The tube is positioned in liquid metal. By creating a vacuum inside the tube, the metal with the suspended inclusions to be detected is forced through the small orifice. Two electrodes are necessary: one inside the tube and the other outside. Both electrodes are immersed in the liquid metal. A constant electric current is applied between the electrodes. The current flows through the liquid metal by the small orifice in the tube. When an inclusion enters the orifice, it displaces its volume of conducting fluid, temporarily raising the electrical resistance. The increase of resistance generates a voltage pulse. The magnitude of the voltage pulse is a function of the volume of the particle. The duration of the pulse is related to the transit time of the inclusion. The voltage pulses are amplified and their amplitude measured digitally. The size distribution and total concentration are displayed in real-time on a computer screen.

== Inclusion removal ==
In order to get a good quality product, removing the inclusion becomes necessary. Liquid metal filtration through a ceramic medium is an efficient way to clean the metal. Different types of ceramic media are used in-line in foundries, such as ceramic foam filters, porous tube filters, bonded ceramic filters, and deep bed filters.

== See also ==
- Non-metallic inclusions for inclusions in steel
- Hydrogen gas porosity
