= Dross =

Impurities in molten metal

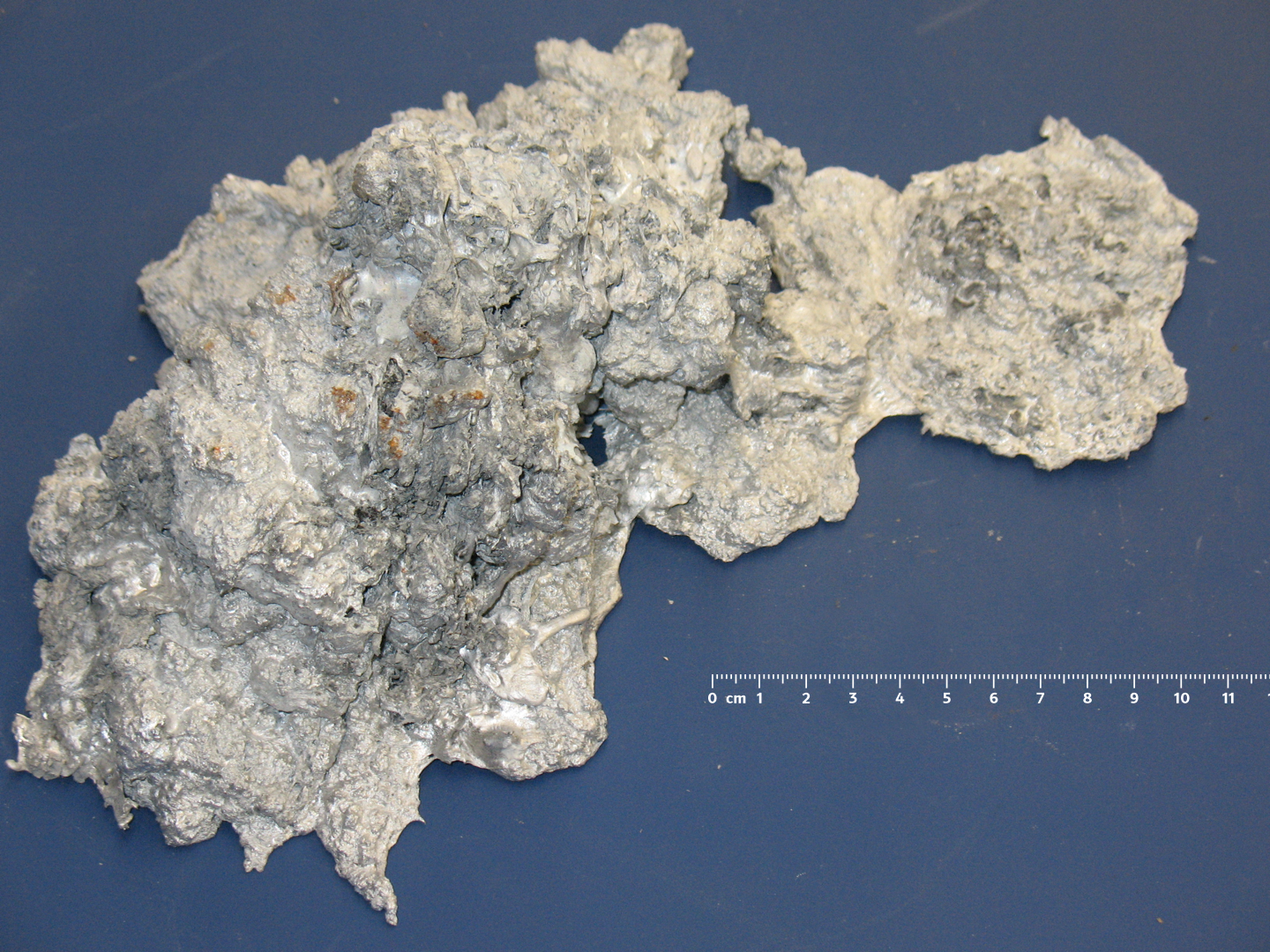
Aluminium dross

Dross is a mass of solid impurities floating on a molten metal or dispersed in the metal, such as in wrought iron. It forms on the surface of low-melting-point metals such as tin, lead, zinc or aluminium or alloys by oxidation of the metal. For higher melting point metals and alloys such as steel and silver, oxidized impurities melt and float making them easy to pour off.

With wrought iron, hammering and later rolling remove some dross. With tin and lead the dross can be removed by adding sodium hydroxide pellets, which dissolve the oxides and form a slag. If floating, dross can also be skimmed off.

Dross, as a solid, is distinguished from slag, which is a liquid. Dross product is not entirely waste material; for example, aluminium dross can be recycled and is also used in secondary steelmaking for slag deoxidation.

== Etymology and usage ==
The term dross derives from the Old English word dros, meaning the scum produced when smelting metals (extracting them from their ores). By the 15th century it had come to refer to rubbish in general. Dregs, and the geological term druse are also thought to be etymologically related. Popular non-metalworking uses of the word are derogatory:

- poorly written or plagiarized journalism - "that article is utter dross", a stronger term than filler
- undesirable, unprofitable work - "let's home in on the lion's share and outsource the dross"; synonyms: corvée and drudgery which are growing archaisms in business (noun); as strong a term as dogsbody work

== See also ==
- Aluminium alloy inclusions
- Slag
