= DISAMATIC =

Sand mold production line

DISAMATIC is an automatic production line used for fast manufacturing of sand molds for sand casting. This process is often used to mass manufacture metal castings for the automotive and machine industries.

== History ==
In 1957, Vagn Aage Jeppesen, professor at the Technical University of Denmark, claimed a patent for a device producing flaskless molds of sand mixtures with vertical parting lines for casting metal parts. In 1960, the Danish company Dansk Industri Syndikat A/S (DISA) acquired the patent and began its implementation.

In 1962, a half scale prototype of a DISAMATIC sand molding machine with flaskless and vertically parted molds. During the International Foundry Trade Fair (GIFA) in 1962 in Düsseldorf, the scale model was demonstrated on DISA's stand. This resulted in sales of two first DISAMATICs to European foundries. The first automatic DISAMATIC molding lines could produce up to 240 complete sand molds per hour.

== Process ==
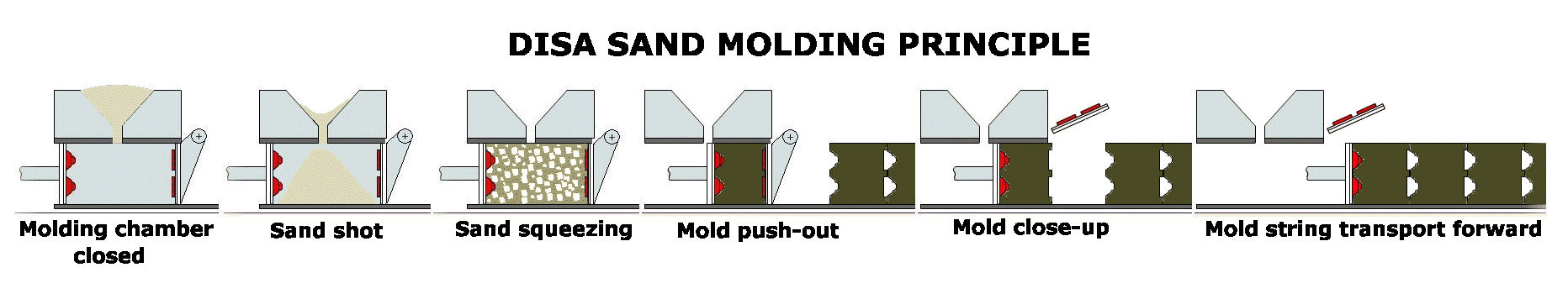

DISAMATIC consists of a molding machine and mold transporting conveyor. A molding sand mixture, usually green sand or bentonite, is blown into a rectangular steel chamber using compressed air. The molding sand is then squeezed between two patterns, which are on the two ends of the chamber. After squeezing, one of the chamber plates swings open and the opposite plate pushes the finished mold onto a conveyor. Finally, any cores are automatically set into the mold cavity while the next mold is being prepared. The cycle repeats until a chain of finished molds butt up to each other on the conveyor.

The molds are then filled with molten metal and placed on a cooling conveyor, which moves at the same pace as the fabrication conveyor. At the end of the conveyor the solidified castings are separated from the molds and processed further, while the sand is directed to the sand preparation plant for reconditioning and reuse in the next cycles of the DISAMATIC molding process.
