= Shell molding =

Expendable mold casting process

Shell molding, also known as shell-mold casting, is an expendable mold casting process that uses resin covered sand to form the mold. As compared to sand casting, this process has better dimensional accuracy, a higher productivity rate, and lower labour requirements. It is used for small to medium parts that require high precision. Shell molding was developed as a manufacturing process during the mid-20th century in Germany. It was invented by German engineer Johannes Croning. Shell mold casting is a metal casting process similar to sand casting, in that molten metal is poured into an expendable mold. However, in shell mold casting, the mold is a thin-walled shell created from applying a sand-resin mixture around a pattern. The pattern, a metal piece in the shape of the desired part, is reused to form multiple shell molds. A reusable pattern allows for higher production rates, while the disposable molds enable complex geometries to be cast. Shell mold casting requires the use of a metal pattern, oven, sand-resin mixture, dump box, and molten metal.

Shell mold casting allows the use of both ferrous and non-ferrous metals, most commonly using cast iron, carbon steel, alloy steel, stainless steel, aluminium alloys, and copper alloys. Typical parts are small-to-medium in size and require high accuracy, such as gear housings, cylinder heads, connecting rods, and lever arms.

The shell mold casting process consists of the following steps:

Pattern creation - A two-piece metal pattern is created in the shape of the desired part, typically from iron or steel. Other materials are sometimes used, such as aluminium for low volume production or graphite for casting reactive materials.

Mold creation - First, each pattern half is heated to 175–370 °C (347–698 °F) and coated with a lubricant to facilitate removal. Next, the heated pattern is clamped to a dump box, which contains a mixture of sand and a resin binder. The dump box is inverted, allowing this sand-resin mixture to coat the pattern. The heated pattern partially cures the mixture, which now forms a shell around the pattern. Each pattern half and surrounding shell is cured to completion in an oven and then the shell is ejected from the pattern.

mold assembly - The two shell halves are joined and securely clamped to form the complete shell mold. If any cores are required, they are inserted prior to closing the mold. The shell mold is then placed into a flask and supported by a backing material.

Pouring - The mold is securely clamped together while the molten metal is poured from a ladle into the gating system and fills the mold cavity.

Cooling - After the mold has been filled, the molten metal is allowed to cool and solidify into the shape of the final casting.

Casting removal - After the molten metal has cooled, the mold can be broken and the casting removed. Trimming and cleaning processes are required to remove any excess metal from the feed system and any sand from the mold.

Examples of shell molded items include gear housings, cylinder heads and connecting rods. It is also used to make high-precision molding cores.

== Process ==
The process of creating a shell mold consists of six steps:

1. Fine silica sand that is covered in a thin (3–6%) thermosetting phenolic resin and liquid catalyst is dumped, blown, or shot onto a hot pattern. The pattern is usually made from cast iron and is heated to 230 to 260 °C (446 to 500 °F). The sand is allowed to sit on the pattern for a few minutes to allow the sand to partially cure.
2. The pattern and sand are then inverted so the excess sand drops free of the pattern, leaving just the "shell". Depending on the time and temperature of the pattern the thickness of the shell is 10 to 20 mm (0.4 to 0.8 in).
3. The pattern and shell together are placed in an oven to finish curing the sand. The shell now has a tensile strength of 350 to 450 psi (2.4 to 3.1 MPa).
4. The hardened shell is then stripped from the pattern.
5. Two or more shells are then combined, via clamping or gluing using a thermoset adhesive, to form a mold. This finished mold can then be used immediately or stored almost indefinitely.
6. For casting, the shell mold is placed inside a flask and surrounded with shot, sand, or gravel to reinforce the shell.

The machine that is used for this process is called a shell molding machine. It heats the pattern, applies the sand mixture, and bakes the shell.

== Details ==
Setup and production of shell mold patterns takes weeks, after which an output of 5–50 pieces/hr-mold is attainable. Common materials include cast iron, aluminum and copper alloys. Aluminum and magnesium products average about 13.5 kg (30 lb) as a normal limit, but it is possible to cast items in the 45–90 kg (100–200 lb) range. The small end of the limit is 30 g (1 oz). Depending on the material, the thinnest cross-section castable is 1.5 to 6 mm (0.06 to 0.24 in). The minimum draft is 0.25 to 0.5 degrees.

Typical tolerances are 0.005 mm/mm or in/in because the sand compound is designed to barely shrink and a metal pattern is used. The cast surface finish is 0.3–4.0 micrometers (50–150 μin) because a finer sand is used. The resin also assists in forming a very smooth surface. The process, in general, produces very consistent castings from one casting to the next.

The sand-resin mix can be recycled by burning off the resin at high temperatures.

== Advantages and disadvantages ==
Advantages

- Very large parts
- Complex, accurate shapes with fine details and good surface finishes
- Reduced machining costs
- Shell molding can be completely automated for mass production.
- High production rate, low labor costs if automated.
- Short lead time possible.
- Many material options.
- Low tooling and equipment cost.
- There are few problems due to gases, because of the absence of moisture in the shell, and the little gas that is still present easily escapes through the thin shell. When the metal is poured some of the resin binder burns out on the surface of the shell, which makes shaking out easy.

Disadvantages

- The gating system must be part of the pattern because the entire mold is formed from the pattern, which can be expensive.
- The resin for the sand is expensive, although not much is required because only a shell is being formed.
- Poor material strength.
- High porosity possible.
- Secondary machining often required.
- High labor cost if done manually.

== Applications ==
Cylinder head, connecting rod, Engine blocks and manifolds, machine bases.
