= Iron founder =

An iron founder (also iron-founder or ironfounder) in its more general sense is a worker in molten ferrous metal, generally working within an iron foundry. However, the term 'iron founder' is usually reserved for the owner or manager of an iron foundry, a person also known in Victorian England as a 'master'. Workers in a foundry are generically described as 'foundrymen'; however, the various craftsmen working in foundries, such as moulders and pattern makers, are often referred to by their specific trades.

Historically the appellation "founder" was given to the supervisor of a blast furnace, and persons who made castings in iron or other heavy metal. The term is also often applied to the company or works in which an iron foundry operates.

== See also ==
- Foundry
- Casting (metalworking)
- Bellfounding
- Coremaking
- Foundry sand testing
- Smelting
