= Foundry sand testing =

Foundry sand testing is a process used to determine if the foundry sand has the correct properties for a certain casting process. The sand is used to make moulds and cores via a pattern. In a sand casting foundry there are broadly two reasons for rejection of the casting — metal and sand — each of which has a large number of internal variables. The defects arising from the sand can be prevented by using sand testing equipment to measure the various properties of the sand.

== Process ==
The testing process is divided into four stages: sampling of the bulk material, sample sand preparation, specimen preparation and testing.

It is done at three different points of the process: upon first arrival from the supplier, en transport for processing (usually on a conveyor), and after processing. In each situation it is important to take a representative sample by mixing the sand or by taking multiple samples in different locations. Also, the sample must be stored in an airtight container to keep from spoiling it.

There are more than 25 basic tests, however only the important ones for the given casting process are used. The basic tests measure the following parameters: wet tensile strength, cone jolt, mouldability, friability, moisture content, permeability, green compression strength, compactibility, loss on ignition, volatiles content, grain size & distribution, dust (dead clay) content, and active clay content, impact strength. Each of these tests can lead you to obtain specific characteristics of sand which can be crucial to the quality of casting. Advanced testing tests for other parameters, such as splitting strength, shear strength, and high-temperature compression strength.

== Sand control ==
Green sand is made up of basic sand (shell sand), bentonite or another binder, pitch powder or coal dust, and uninvited dust. Green sand properties cannot be standardized for all foundries and castings as such, yet place to place and job to job the specifications can be set to maintain minimal amount of rejection. A basic set of parameters to test are:

1. Fineness number (grain size/AFS Number) of the base sand
2. Moisture content in the mixture (ranges from 2-7% depending on the casting method)
3. Permeability (ability of compacted mould to pass air through it)
4. Total clay content (dust content)
5. Active clay content (presence of active bentonite/clay which can readily bond)
6. Compressive strength
7. Hardness ('B' or 'C' Scale)

For parameters 1, 2, 4 and 5 standard bulk material sampling methods can be applicable or sampling can be done with help of sand muller, sand sampler and sand splitter to do it in a standardized manner.

== See also ==
- Sand rammer
- Sand molding
