= Core (manufacturing) =

Device used in casting and molding

A core is a device used in casting and moulding processes to produce internal cavities and reentrant angles (an interior angle that is greater than 180°). The core is normally a disposable item that is destroyed to get it out of the piece. They are most commonly used in sand casting, but are also used in die casting and injection moulding.

For example, cores define multiple passages inside cast engine blocks. One model of GM V-8 engine requires 5 dry-sand cores for every casting.

== Materials required to make cores ==
- Core sand
- Bentonite clay
- Pulverized coal
- Resin oil

== Advantages and disadvantages ==
Cores are useful for features that cannot tolerate draft or to provide detail that cannot otherwise be integrated into a core-less casting or mold.

The main disadvantage is the additional cost to incorporate cores.

== Requirements ==
There are seven requirements for cores:

1. Green strength: In the green condition, there must be adequate strength for handling
2. In the hardened state, it must be strong enough to handle the forces of casting; therefore, the compression strength should be 100 to 300 psi (0.69 to 2.07 MPa).
3. Permeability must be very high to allow for the escape of gases.
4. Friability: As the casting or molding cools, the core must be weak enough to break down as the material shrinks. Moreover, they must be easy to remove during shakeout.
5. Good refractoriness is required as the core is usually surrounded by hot metal during casting or molding.
6. A smooth surface finish.
7. Minimum generation of gases during metal pouring.

== Types ==
Many types of cores are available. The selection of the correct type of core depends on production quantity, production rate, required precision, required surface finish, and the type of metal being used. For example, certain metals are sensitive to gases that are given off by certain types of core sands; other metals have too low of a melting point to properly break down the binder for removal during the shakeout.

=== Green-sand cores ===
Green-sand cores

Green-sand cores makes casting long narrow features difficult or impossible. Even for long features that can be cast it still leave much material to be machined. A typical application is a through hole in a casting.

=== Dry-sand cores ===
The simplest way to make a dry-sand cores is in a dump core box, in which sand is packed into the box and scraped level with the top. A wood or metal plate is then placed over the box, and then the two are flipped over and the core segment falls out of the core box. The core segment is then baked or hardened. Multiple core segments are then hot glued together or attached by some other means. Any rough spots are filed or sanded down. Finally, the core is lightly coated with graphite, silica, or mica to give a smoother surface finish and greater resistance to heat. Single-piece cores do not need to be assembled because they are made in a split core box. A split core box, like it sounds, is made of two halves and has at least one hole for sand to be introduced. For simple cores that have constant cross-sections they can be created on special core-producing extruders. The extrusions are then cut to the proper length and hardened. More complex single-piece cores can be made in a manner similar to injection moldings and die castings.

Types of core:

- cold box
- half core box
- dump core box
- split core box
- left and right core box
- gang core box
- strickle core box
- loose piece core box

=== Lost cores ===
Cores are used for complex injection moldings in the fusible core injection molding process. First, a core is made from a fusible alloy or low melting temperature polymer. It is then placed inside the injection mold's dies and the plastic is shot into the mold. The molding is then removed from the mold with the core still in it. Finally, the core is melted or washed out of the molding in a hot bath.

== Binders ==
Special binders are introduced into core sands to add strength. The oldest binder was vegetable oil, however now synthetic oil is used, in conjunction with cereal or clay. The core is then baked in a convection oven between 200 and 250 °C (392 and 482 °F). The heat causes the binder to cross-link or polymerize. While this process is simple, the dimensional accuracy is low.

Another type of binder process is called the hot-box process, which uses a thermoset and catalyst for a binder. The sand with the binder is packed into a core box that is heated to approximately 230 °C (446 °F) (which is where the name originated from). The binder that touches the hot surface of the core box begins to cure within 10 to 30 seconds. Depending on the type of binder it may require further baking to fully cure. Cores produced using this method are sometimes referred to as "shell-core" because often, only the outside layer of the core is hardened when in contact with the hot corebox. When the corebox is opened and the core removed, the uncured sand inside the core is dumped out to be reused. This practice can also be observed in some cold-box coremaking practices, though cold box shell-core making is much less common.

In a similar vein, the cold-box process uses a binder that is hardened through the use of special gases. The binder coated sand is packed into a core box and then sealed so that a curing gas can be introduced. These gases are often toxic (i.e. amine gas) or odorous (i.e. SO_{2}), so special handling systems must be used. However, because high temperatures are not required the core box can be made from metal, wood, or plastic. An added benefit is that hollow core can be formed if the gas is introduced via holes in the core surface which cause only the surface of the core to harden; the remaining sand is then just dumped out to be used again. For example, a cold-box sand casting core binder is sodium silicate which hardens on exposure to carbon dioxide.

Special binders are used in air-set sands to produce core at room temperature. These sands do not require a gas catalyst because organic binders and a curing catalyst are mixed together in the sand which initiates the curing process. The only disadvantage with this is that after the catalyst is mixed in there is a short time to use the sand. A third way to produce room temperature cores is by shell molding.

The term no-bake sands can refer to either the cold-box process or air-set process.

=== Other considerations ===
To increase the strength of cores internal wires and rods can be added. To enhance collapsibility, straw can be added to the middle of the core or a hollow core can be used. This attribute is especially important for steel casting because a large amount of shrinkage occurs.

Except for very small cores, all cores require vent holes to release gases. These are usually formed by using small wires to create holes from the surface of the mold to the core. When this is not feasible cinder and coke can be added to the core to increase permeability.

== Chaplets ==
A diagram of chaplet usage

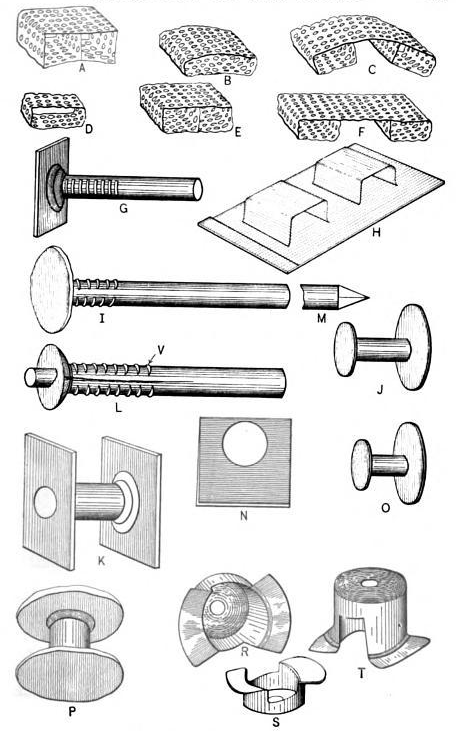
Various types of chaplets

If Fub^{what is it?}≤0, no chaplet is used.

If Fub>0, chaplets is used.

As mentioned earlier, cores are usually supported by two core prints in the mold. However, there are situations where a core only uses one core print so other means are required to support the cantilevered end. These are usually supplied in the form of chaplets. These are metal supports that bridge the gap between the mold surface and the core. Since the chaplets become part of the casting, the chaplets must be of the same or similar material as the metal being cast. Moreover, their design must be optimized because if they are too small they will completely melt and allow the core to move, but if they are too big then their whole surface cannot melt and fuse with the poured metal. Their use should also be minimized because they can cause casting defects or create weak spots in the casting. It is usually more critical to ensure the upper chaplets are stronger than the lower ones because the core will tend to float upward in the molten metal.

== Cheeks ==
A cheek used to create a pulley

When casting a reentrant angle, instead of using a core a cheek can be used. This is a third segment in the flask, in addition to the cope and drag. This allows the entire mold to be made from green sand and from removable patterns. The disadvantage of this is more mold-making operations are required, but it is usually advantageous when the quantities are low. However, if large quantities of casting are required, it is usually more cost effective to simply use a core.

== See also ==
- Core plug
