= Permeability (foundry sand) =

Property of foundry sand

Standard permeability meter

Permeability is a property of foundry sand with respect to how well the sand can vent, i.e. how well gases pass through the sand. And in other words, permeability is the property by which we can know the ability of material to transmit fluid/gases. The permeability is commonly tested to see if it is correct for the casting conditions.

== Affecting factors ==
The grain size, shape and distribution of the foundry sand, the type and quantity of bonding materials, the density to which the sand is rammed, and the percentage of moisture used for tempering the sand are important factors in regulating the degree of permeability.

== Significance ==
An increase in permeability usually indicates a more open structure in the rammed sand, and if the increase continues, it will lead to penetration-type defects and rough castings. A decrease in permeability indicates tighter packing and could lead to blows and pinholes.

== Testing procedure ==
- On a prepared mould surface as a sample, permeability can be checked with use of a mould permeability attachment to permeability meter, readings such obtained are of relative permeability, and not absolute permeability. The relative permeability reading on a mould surface is only used to gauge sample-to-sample variation.
- On standard specimen as a sample
  - For sands that can be compressed, e.g.: bentonite-bonded sand, also known as green sand, a compressed or rammed sample is used to check permeability.
  - For sand that cannot be compressed, e.g.: Resin-coated sands, a freely filled sample is used. To check such a sample, user may have to use an attachment to the permeability meter called a core permeability tube.

The absolute permeability number, which has no units, is determined by the rate of flow of air, under standard pressure, through a rammed cylindrical specimen. DIN standards define the specimen dimensions to be 50 mm in diameter and 50 mm tall, while the American Foundry Society defines it to be two inches in diameter and two inches tall. rammed cylindrical specimen.

formula is

PN = (VxH)/PxAxT

where

- V = volume of air in ml passing through the specimen
- H = Height of the specimen in cm
- A = Cross sectional area of specimen in cm2
- P = Pressure of air in cm of water
- T = Time in minutes

American Foundry Society has also released a chart where back pressure (P) from a rammed specimen placed on a permeability meter is correlated with a Permeability number. The Permeability number so measured is used in foundries for recording permeability value.
