= Ceramsite sand =

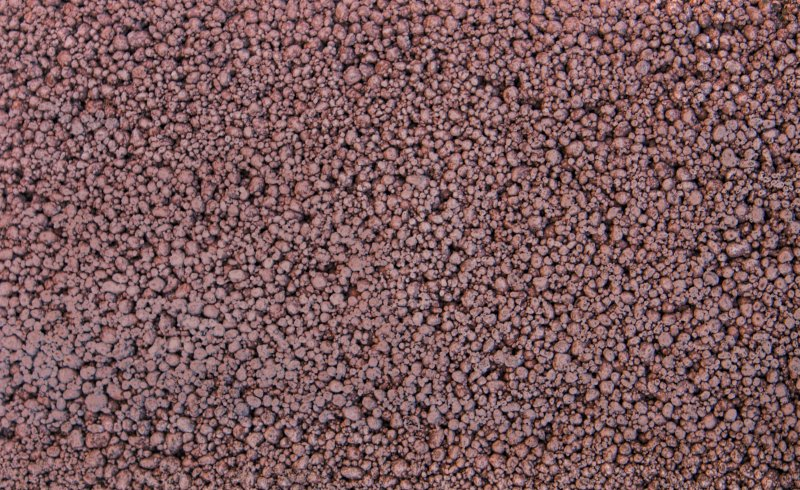
Ceramsite structure

Ceramsite sand is an artificial foundry sand originating in China. It is a substitute for chromite sand and zircon sand in the foundry and petroleum industries. Ceramsite sand has been used in 3D printing to produce molds, but the printed layer is prone to deviation from the location of the original object, known as pushing dislocation.
