= Cope and drag =

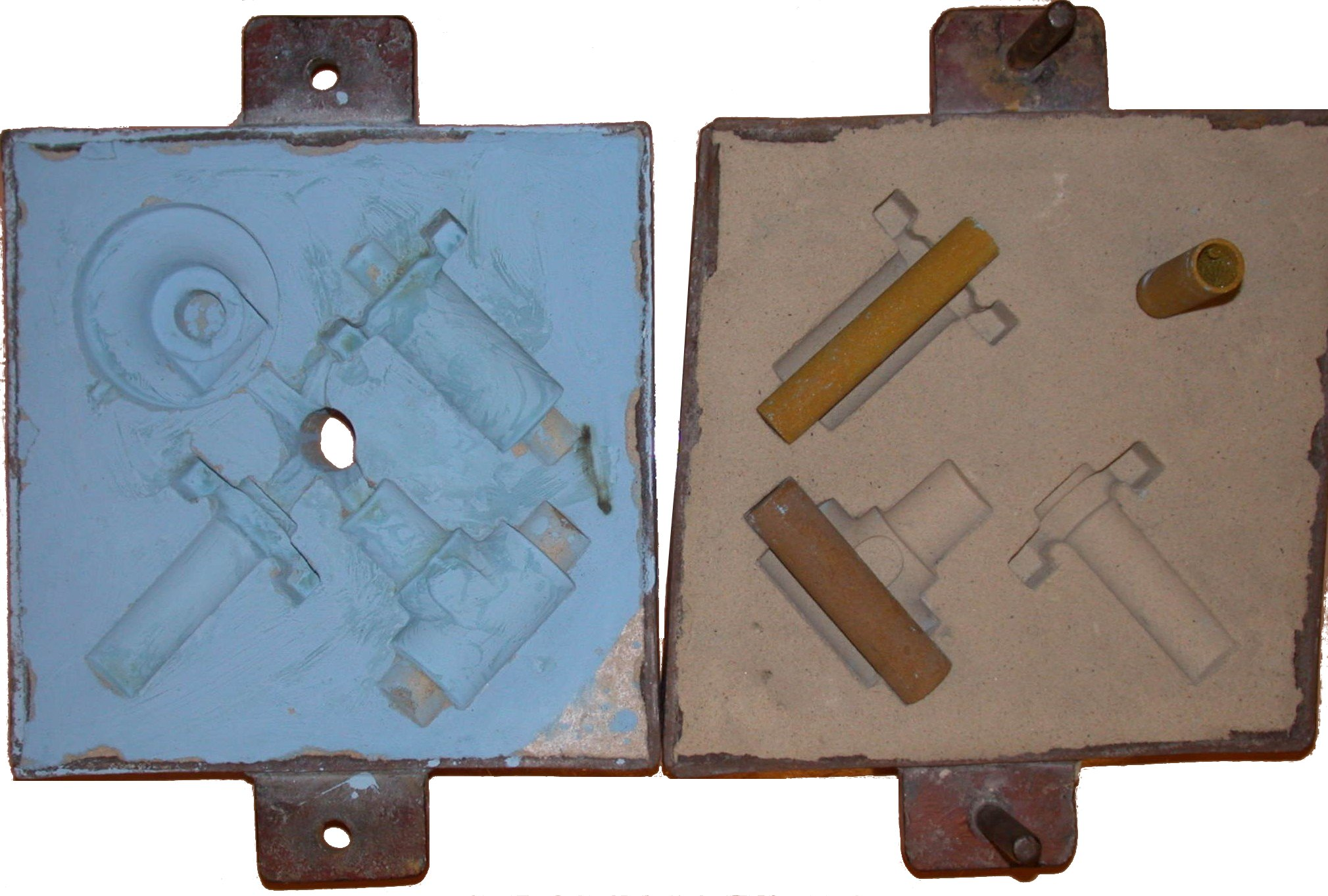
Cope and drag with cores in place on the drag

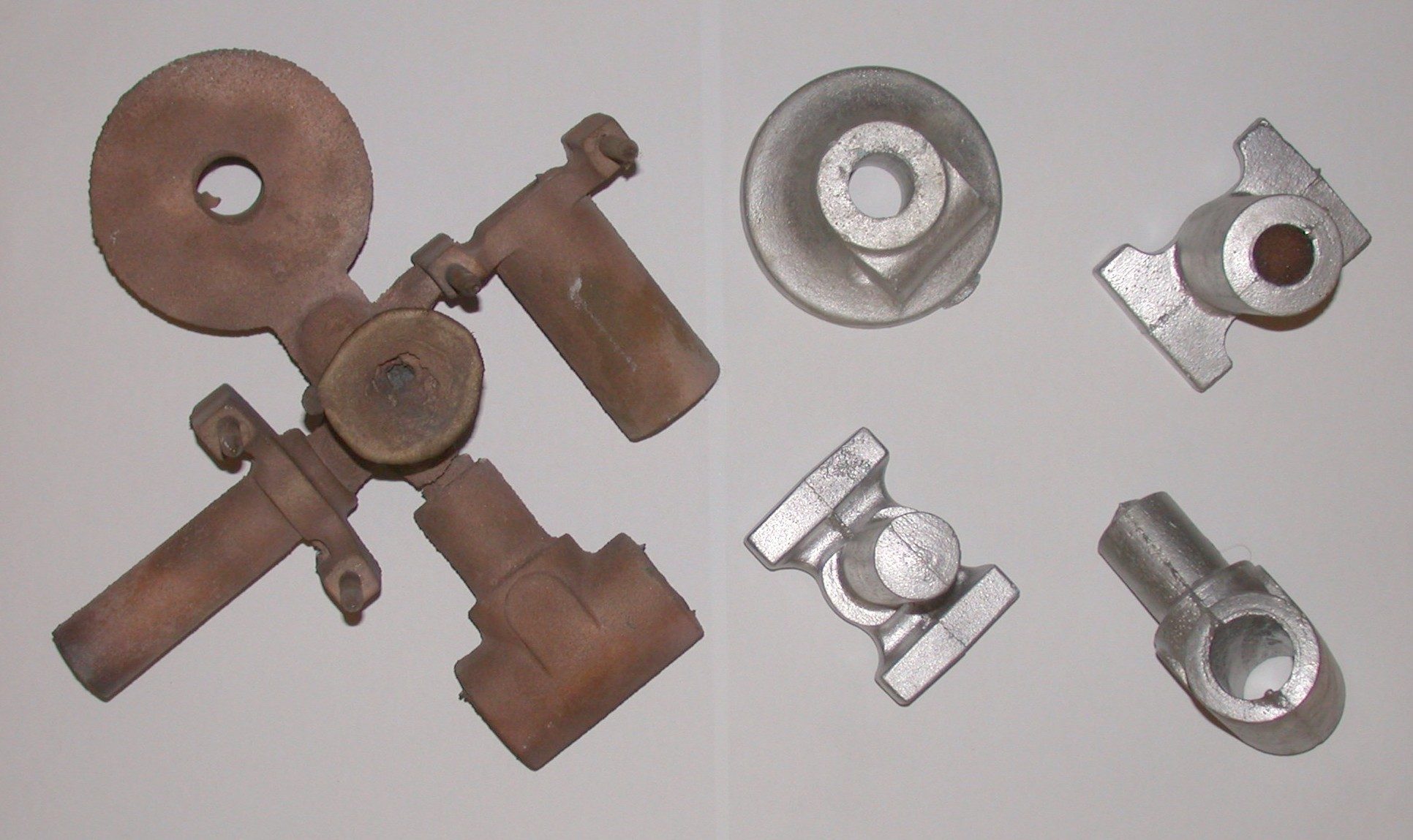
Two sets of castings (bronze and aluminum) from the above sand mold

In foundry work, the terms cope and drag refer respectively to the top and bottom parts of a two-part casting flask, used in sand casting. The flask is a wood or metal frame, which contains the molding sand, providing support to the sand as the metal is poured into the mold. In flaskless molding, the same terms are used, cope for the top or upper piece and drag for the bottom or lower piece.

In the simplest sand-casting procedure, the drag is placed upside down on a board, around a pattern of the part to be cast. The pattern is a model of the desired casting. Talcum powder is often dusted over the pattern to aid in the removal of the pattern. Sand is sifted over the pattern until the model is covered by a few inches of sand. More sand is then dumped into the drag, and rammed with a wooden wedge, or mechanically vibrated to pack the sand down. The sand is then struck level with the top edge of the drag, using a wooden or metal strake. A board is then placed on top of the drag and the drag is flipped over.

Then, the cope is placed on the drag, and dowels (or pins) are put in the sand to make holes for the sprue and one or more risers. Talcum powder and sand are again sifted over the pattern and rammed to fill the cope. The pins are then carefully pulled out of the sand. The critical part of the operation is to separate the cope and drag to remove the pattern. The pattern may be vibrated with a powered vibrator, or the pattern, and maybe the cope and drag flask, will be lightly tapped with a small hammer. The pattern is lifted from the sand, leaving a molding cavity. A passageway for metal to enter the mold, called a "gate", is then cut from the sprue hole to the void left by the pattern, and a runner is cut from the sand to allow metal to flow into the riser.

The flask is then put back together, and metal can be poured into the mold. The metal will flow down the sprue, into the mold cavity, and back up the riser (of which there may be several). Once the metal has cooled enough to solidify, the flask can then be separated again, and the sand removed to reveal the rough casting. The rough casting is separated from the sprue and riser(s) either by sawing them off or just breaking the thin metal of the gates and runners.

In some cases, the part design is more complicated, and intermediate flasks and mold sections are needed between the cope and drag. These sections are called cheeks.

== Sources ==
- Davis, Joseph R., ed. (1996). Cast Irons (Illustrated, 2nd ed.). ASM International. pp. 157–160. ISBN 0871705648.
