= Molding sand =

Molding sand, also known as foundry sand, is a sand that when moistened and compressed or oiled or heated tends to pack well and hold its shape. It is used in the process of sand casting for preparing the mold cavity.

== Green sand ==
Green sand is an aggregate of sand, bentonite clay, pulverized coal and water. Its principal use is in making molds for metal casting. The largest portion of the aggregate is a sand, usually silica or sometimes olivine. There are many recipes for the proportion of clay, but they all strike different balances between moldability, surface finish, and ability of the hot molten metal to degas. The coal, typically referred to in as sea-coal, which is present at a ratio of less than 5%, partially combusts in the surface of the molten metal, leading to the offgassing of organic vapors.

Sand casting is one of the earliest forms of casting practiced due to the simplicity of materials involved. It still remains one of the cheapest ways to cast metal because of that same simplicity. Other methods of casting, such as those using shell molds, boast higher quality of surface finish but have a higher cost.

Green sand (like other casting sands) is usually housed in what foundry workers refer to as "flask", which are nothing other than boxes without a bottom or lid. The box is split into two halves which are stacked together in use. The top and bottom halves are referred to as the cope and drag flask respectively.

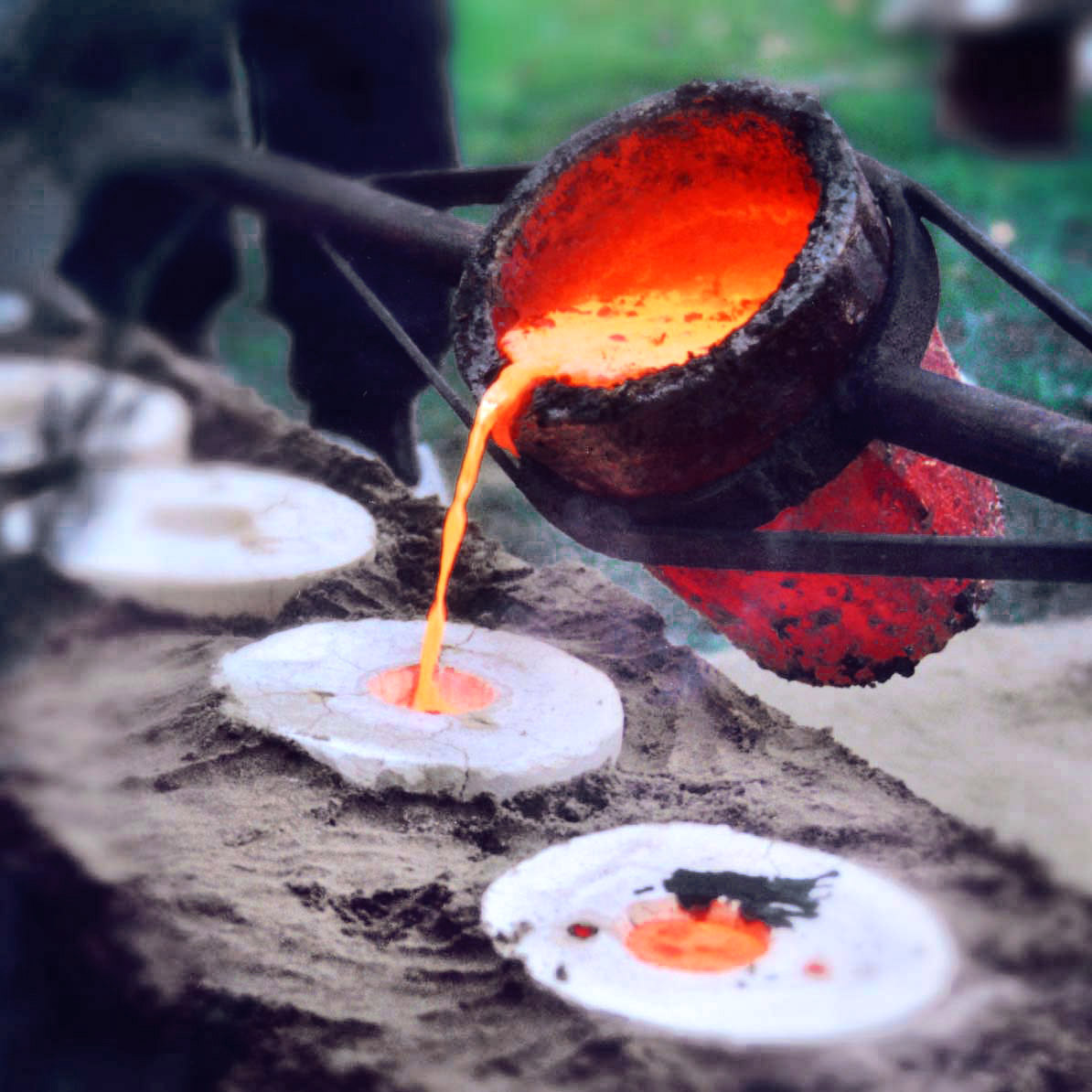
A crucible containing bronze is poured into the Green Sand, which contains a hollow shape below, that will become the finished cast.

Not all Green sand is green in color. But considered "green" in the sense that it is used in a wet state (akin to green wood). According to the Cast Metals Federation website, an alternative casting method is to heat-dry the molded sand before pouring the molten metal. This dry sand casting process results in a more rigid mold better suited to heavier castings.

== See also ==
- Cope and drag
- DISAMATIC
- Foundry sand testing
- Hand mould
- Sand casting
- Sand rammer
- Ceramsite sand

== History ==
There is no clear record in history to attribute the first metal casting and use of molding sand, but ancient artefacts and writings allude to a period around 3200 B.C..

Molding sand was initially used exclusively for bronze casts, which was pioneered by the ancient Chinese.

Greensand casting may have been used to produce Brass produce, along the Meuse Valley, of the Low Countries, as early as the 15th century.

Italian Vannoccio Biringuccio, and German Georgius Agricola, both published books in the 16th century, on the processes of sand casting.

Abraham Darby I, obtained an English patent in 1707, for his process to produce, coke smelted, Cast iron products from greensand molds.

In modern times, the United States produces 8.4 million tons of iron castings, 1.4 million tons of steel castings, 1.7 million tons of aluminum castings, and 321 thousand tons of copper castings annually. Much of the modern metal industry has innovated because of a massive increase in sand quality due to better instrumentation, as well as metallurgy, and better understanding of metal properties.
