= Veining (metallurgy) =

Metallurgical casting defect

In metallurgy a veining (or finning) is the occurrence of a sheet like casting defect, produced by molten metal penetration into a sand casting mould.

Veining

a defect on the surface of a casting appearing as fins, veins or wrinkles and associated with excessive thermal movement of the sand, especially core sand

— AFS Metalcasting Dictionary.

== Description ==
Veining occurs as 'vein' like projections from a casting, usually at right angles to the casting's surface; the phenonoma can occur in any alloy, and is commonly seen in ferrous or copper based castings.

Veining has been attributed to temperature differences at distance from the molten metal resulting in differential thermal expansion in the sand leading to strain in, and failure of the sand mould. Research has shown that a main cause of veining is thermal expansion of the silica sand in combination with reduction in sand volume above 573C (after the alpha to beta silica phase transformation) due to softening/sintering and/or melting of sand grains, which results in cracking/voids.

Veining can be reduced or avoided by the use of more refractory non-silica sands (zircon, chromite etc); by flux additives which lower the temperature of silica transition to tridymite or cristobalite, or which sinter the sand increasing resistance to failure; or by organic additives which are decomposed to carbon at high temperature, which then bonds to silica increasing strength, imparting veining resistance.

== See also ==
- Quartz inversion, 573C silica phase change leading to cracking in ceramics
