= Sand rammer =

A sand rammer is a piece of equipment used in foundry sand testing to make test specimen of molding sand by compacting bulk material by free fixed height drop of fixed weight for 3 times. It is also used to determine compactibility of sands by using special specimen tubes and a linear scale.

Sand Rammer

== Mechanism ==
Sand rammer consists of calibrated sliding weight actuated by cam, a shallow cup to accommodate specimen tube below ram head, a specimen stripper to strip compacted specimen out of specimen tube, a specimen tube to prepare the standard specimen of 50 mm diameter by 50 mm height or 2 inch diameter by 2 inch height for an AFS standard specimen.

== Specimen preparation ==
The cam is actuated by a user by rotating the handle, causing a cam to lift the weight and let it fall freely on the frame attached to the ram head. This produces a standard compacting action to a pre-measured amount of sand. Demonstration of this apparatus can be seen here: "Sand Rammer Demonstration" on YouTube

Variety of standard specimen for Green Sand and Silicate based (CO_{2})sand are prepared using a sand rammer along with accessories

Specimen	Type of sand
Compression (Cylindrical)	Green Sand and Silicate based sand
Tensile Specimen	Silicate based sand
Transverse Specimen	Silicate based sand

The object for producing the standard cylindrical specimen is to have the specimen become 2 inches high (plus or minus 1/32 inch) with three rams of the machine. After the specimen has been prepared inside the specimen tube, the specimen can be used for various standard sand tests such as the permeability test, the green sand compression test, the shear test, or other standard foundry tests.

The sand rammer machine can be used to measure compactability of prepared sand by filling the specimen tube with prepared sand so that it is level with the top of the tube. The tube is then placed under the ram head in the shallow cup and rammed three times. Compactability in percentage is then calculated from the resultant height of the sand inside the specimen tube.

A rammer is mounted on a base block on a solid foundation, which provides vibration damping to ensure consistent ramming.

== Used for sand types ==
- Green sand
- Oil sand
- CO_{2} sand
- Raw sand i.e. base sand i.e. un-bonded sand.

== Prerequisites ==
Prerequisite equipments for sand rammer may vary from case to case basis or testing scenario:
Case 1: If the prepared sand is ready

- Tube filler accessory to fill sample tube with sand. Advantage is it lets the sand fill in from fixed distance and riddles it before filling.

Case 2: Experiment by preparing new sand sample If sand needs to be prepared before making specimen following equipments may be needed

- Laboratory sand muller or laboratory sand mixer (for core sands)

Case 3: For low compressive strength sands and mixtures:

- Split specimen tube
