= Quartz inversion =

P-T Diagram for SiO2, Low Quartz, α-quartz, has a trigonal crystal system, while High Quartz, β-quartz, has a hexagonal crystal system.

The room-temperature form of quartz, α-quartz, undergoes a reversible change in crystal structure at 573 °C to form β-quartz. This phenomenon is called an inversion, and for the α to β quartz inversion is accompanied by a linear expansion of 0.45%. This inversion can lead to cracking of ceramic ware if cooling occurs too quickly through the inversion temperature. This is called dunting, and the resultant faults are known as dunts. To avoid such thermal shock faults, cooling rates not exceeding 50 °C/hour have been recommended.

At 870 °C quartz ceases to be stable but, in the absence of fluxes, does not alter until a much higher temperature is reached, when, depending on the temperature and nature of the fluxes present, it is converted into the polymorphs of cristobalite and / or tridymite. These polymorphs also experience temperature-induced inversions. The inversion of cristobalite at 220 °C can be advantageous to achieve the cristobalite squeeze. This puts the glazes into compression and so helps prevent crazing.

The size of the silica particles influences inversions, conversions and other properties of the ceramic body. The presence of other ceramic raw materials can influence the thermal behaviour of quartz, including:

- Talc promotes the conversion of quartz to cristobalite, and if sufficient alumina is available the formation of cordierite.
- Nepheline syenite increases the dissolution of silica.
- Petalite promotes the formation of cristobalite.
- Alumina can react with silica to form mullite.

== See also ==
- Veining (metallurgy), sand casting defect associated with the alpha to beta silica phase change
