= Sand slinger =

Machine that directs sand, gravel and has two types of machines

Sand slinger is the term for two different types of machines. Both of which use a short conveyor belt to direct sand, gravel or similar materials to varying locations.

== Stationary mold filling machine ==
A stationary sand slinger is a type of machine used for filling and uniform ramming of sand in casting molds, and is particularly advantageous with large molds. This machine consists of a heavy base, a bin or hopper to carry sand, and a bucket elevator to which a number of buckets and a swinging arm are attached, which carries a conveyor belt and the sand impeller head.

The sand slinger fills the flask uniformly with sand under a high pressure stream throwing the sand with high speed using the impeller.

== Mobile aggregate moving truck ==
A slinger truck is usually a dump truck equipped with a pivoted conveyor belt used to sling dry bulk material, usually sand or gravel, for a distance of several metres.
