= American Foundry Society =

Organization

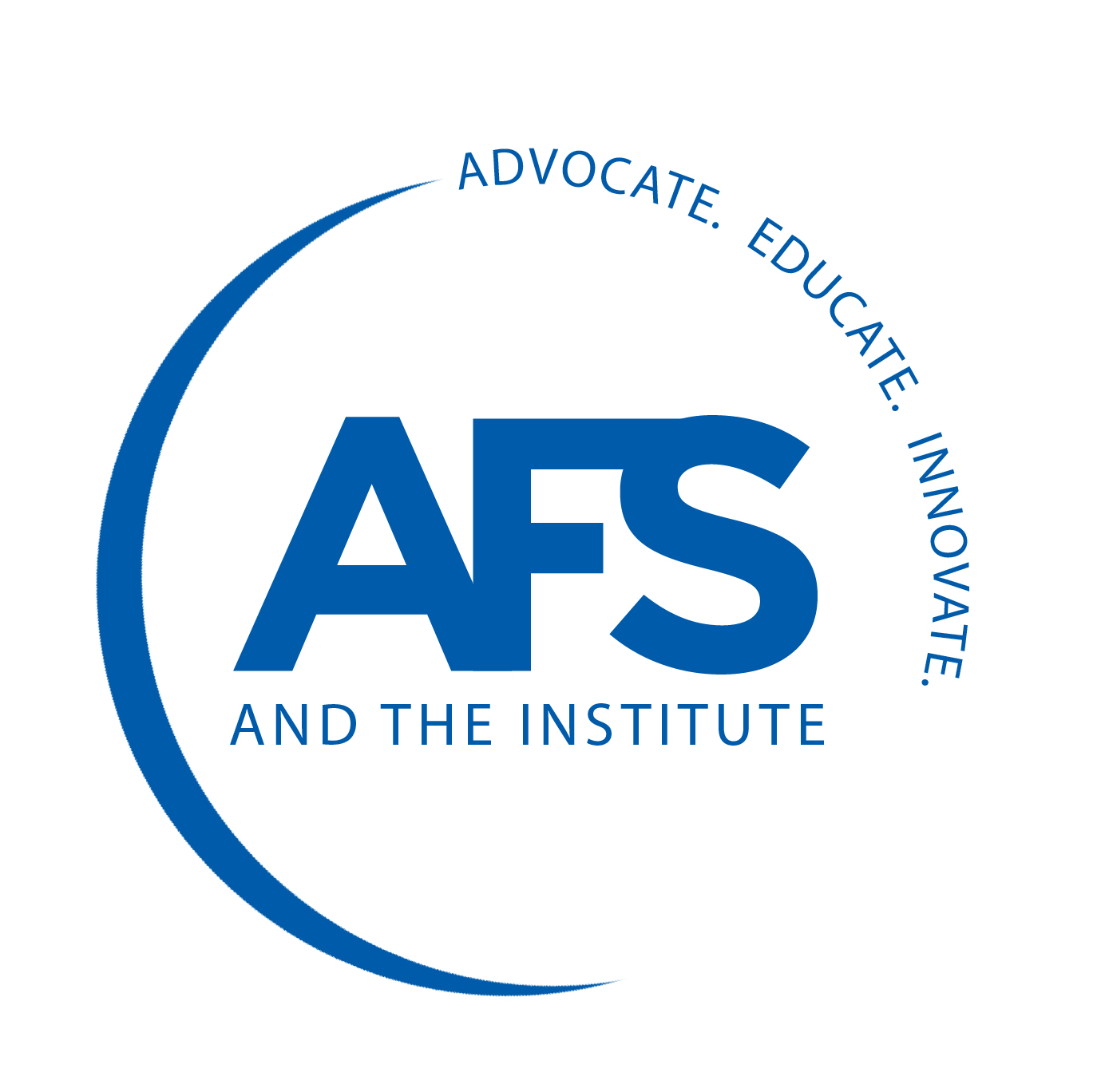
- Abbreviation: AFS
- Established: 1896
- Type: Professional association
- Headquarters: Schaumburg, Illinois
- Services: Lobbying, education, research, networking and public relations
- President: David Gilson
- Volunteers: 1,000
- Website: www.afsinc.org

The American Foundry Society (AFS) is a professional, technical and trade association for foundries and the broader metal casting industry. The society promotes the interests of foundries to policymakers, provides training for foundry workers, and supports research and technological advancements in foundry science and manufacturing.

AFS represents ferrous and nonferrous foundries based in North America, as well as industry suppliers and end-users of metal castings from around the world. The society has individual and corporate members across 48 countries, organized into regional chapters and student chapters in the United States, Canada and Mexico. AFS presents Metalcasting Congress, a yearly industry conference, as well as CastExpo, a trade show and exposition that occurs every three years.

AFS is based in Schaumburg, Illinois, and also maintains an office in Washington, D.C. Justin Scott, Ph.D. is CEO of the organization, joining in January of 2026.

== History ==
The American Foundry Society traces its roots to 1896, when the American Foundrymen's Association was formed.

For a number of years prior to the founding of the society, many local bodies of foundrymen met for mutual protection in regard to labor, prices and interchange of technical information. The attendance was usually strong in these organizations in times of prosperity but waned when economic conditions slowed. Early in 1896 the Philadelphia Foundrymen's Society through discussion with its members conceived that a more general, larger benefit might be gained through organizing a wider group of foundrymen. They invited foundrymen from around the country to Philadelphia for a meeting. The response was spontaneous and well received. On May 12, 1896, the American Foundrymen's Association was formed.

The organization's name was subsequently changed to The American Foundrymen's Society. In 2000, it was renamed the American Foundry Society, or AFS.

== Organization ==
The Society has approximately 1,100 corporate members and 7,000 individual members. There are 40 regional chapters, as well as 40 student chapters at colleges and universities. AFS is organized into 13 Divisions with committees under each division:

- Engineering Division and Smart Manufacturing
- Additive Manufacturing Division
- Aluminum and Light Metals Division
- Copper Alloy Division
- Molding Methods & Materials Division
- Cast Iron Division
- Melting Methods & Materials Division
- Steel Division
- Environmental, Health & Safety Division
- Lost Foam Division
- Government Affairs Division
- Human Resources Division
- Marketing Division
- Women in Metalcasting
- Young Professionals

In addition to these divisions, the organization has technical staff to assist with engineering services, a system to support research, and an extensive library containing more than 18,000 articles available free of charge to all members.

AFS also operates the AFS Institute, previously known as the Cast Metals Institute. The AFS Institute provides classroom training, web courses and e-learning for foundry professionals across all major alloys and foundry processes.

== Past Presidents ==
- 2026-2027: John Lancaster, General Motors
- 2025-2026: David Gilson, SinterCast
- 2024-2025: Angela Schmeisser, St. Mary's Foundry
- 2023-2024: Brad Muller, Charlotte Pipe & Foundry
- 2022-2023: Adam San Solo, Neenah Enterprises
- 2020-2022: Mike Lenahan, Badger Mining Corp.
- 2019-2020: Peter Reich, LAEMPE REICH
- 2018-2019: Jean Bye, Dotson Iron Castings
- 2017-2018: Patricio Gil, Blackhawk de Mexico
- 2016-2017: Jeff Cook, Eagle Alloy
- 2015-2016: Bruce W. Dienst, Simpson Technologies
- 2014-2015: Christopher C. Norch, Denison Industries
- 2013-2014: Dennis Dotson, Dotson Iron Castings
- 2012-2013: Michael L. Selz, Charlotte Pipe & Foundry
- 2011-2012: Tim McMillin, Fairmount Minerals
- 2010-2011: Henry W. Lodge, Lodge Manufacturing Company (Lodge (company))
- 2009-2010: Steve Reynolds, Lufkin Industries
- 2007-2009: Paul Mikkola, Metal Casting Technology Inc.
- 2006-2007: Albert Lucchetti, Cumberland Foundry
- 2005-2006: James Keffer, EBAA Iron Sales
- 2004-2005: Charles M. Kurtti, Neenah Foundry Company
- 2003-2004: Arthur Edge, American Cast Iron Pipe Company
- 2002-2003: Paul B. Cervellero, Inductotherm Corp.
- 2001-2002: Donald L. Huizenga, Kurdziel Industries
- 2000-2001: Donald E. Gaertner, Metalcasting Equipment Inc.
- 1999-2000: Jack Pohlman, Taylor-Pohlman
- 1998-1999: Jack Moore, Stahl Specialty Co.
- 1997-1998: George Boyd, Sr., Goldens' Foundry
- 1996-1997: Henry W. Dienst, Simpson Technologies
- 1995-1996: Dwight J. Barnhard, Superior Aluminum Castings
- 1994-1995: Thomas E. Woehlke, Lawran Foundry
- 1993-1994: Daniel M. Goodyear, Pennsylvania Steel Foundry & Machine
- 1992-1993: Ray H. Witt, CMI International
- 1991-1992: R. Conner Warren, Citation Corp.
- 1990-1991: Jerry Agin, The Hill & Griffith Co.
- 1989-1990: James D. Pearson (ACMA Chairman), Aurora Industries
- 1989-1990: Alvin W. Singleton, Intermet Corp.
- 1988-1989: Tim Hitchcock, Hitchcock Industries
- 1987-1988: Albert W. Gruer (ACMA Chairman), Waupaca Foundry
- 1987-1988: Anton Dorfmueller, Ashland Chemical
- 1986-1987: John L. Kelly, Textron
- 1985-1986: William M. O’Neill, Alloy Engineering & Casting Co.
- 1984-1985: George N. Booth, Ford Motor Company
- 1983-1984: Hugh Sims, Jr., Vulcan Engineering
- 1982-1983: Eugene E. Paul, The Dalton Foundries
- 1981-1982: Lawrence S. Krueger Pelton Casteel
- 1980-1981: Charles E. Drury, Hayes-Albion Corp
- 1979-1980: J.R. Bodine, Bodine Aluminum
- 1978-1979: John A. Wagner, Jr., Wagner Castings
- 1977-1978: Roy Nosek, Beardsley & Piper Div., Pettibone Corp.
- 1975-1977: Tom Wiltse, General Motors
- 1975: Frank Ryan, St. Paul Brass Foundry
- 1974-1975: Charles Fausel, Lester B. Knight & Associates
- 1973-1974: Sam Clow, Clow water systems company
- 1972-1973: Burleigh E. Jacobs, Grede Foundries
- 1971-1972: J. Douglas James, Urick Foundry Co.
- 1970-1971: Clyde Sanders, American Colloid
- 1969-1970: John O’Meara, Banner Iron Works
- 1968-1969: Bernard Ames, Columbian Bronze
- 1967-1968: Charles F. Seelbach, Jr., Forest City Foundries
- 1966-1967: Dale Hall, Oklahoma Steel Castings
- 1965-1966: Warren Jeffrey, McWane Cast Iron Pipe Co.
- 1964-1965: Thomas Lloyd, Albion Malleable Iron Co.
- 1963-1964: Allen Slichter, Pelton Steel Casting Co.
- 1962-1963: John A. Wagner, Wagner Castings Co.
- 1961-1962: Albert L. Hunt, Superior Foundry
- 1960-1961: Norman Dunbeck, International Minerals & Chemical
- 1959-1960: Charles Nelson, Dow Chemical
- 1958-1959: Lewis Durdin, Dixie Bronze Co.
- 1957-1958: Harry Dietert, Harry W. Dietert Co.
- 1956-1957: Frank W. Shipley, Caterpillar Tractor Co.Caterpillar Inc.
- 1955-1956: Bruce L. Simpson, National Engineering Co.
- 1954-1955: Frank Dost, Sterling Foundry
- 1953-1954: Collins Carter, Albion Malleable Iron Co.
- 1952-1953: I. Richards Wagner, Electric Steel Castings Co.
- 1951-1952: Walter L. Seelbach, Superior Foundry
- 1950-1951: Walton Woody, National Malleable & Steel Castings Co.
- 1949-1950: E.W. Horlebein, Gibson & Kirk Co.
- 1948-1949: W.B. Wallis, Pittsburgh Lectromelt Furnace Co.
- 1947-1948: Max Kuniansky, Lynchburg Foundry
- 1946-1947: S.V. Wood, Minneapolis Electric Steel Castings Co.
- 1945-1946: Fred J. Walls, International Nickel Co.
- 1944-1945: Ralph Teetor, Cadillac Malleable Iron Co
- 1943-1944: Lee C. Wilson, American Chain & Cable Co.
- 1942-1943: D.P. Forbest, Gunite Foundries Corp.
- 1941-1942: Herbert S. Simpson, National Engineering Co.
- 1940-1941: L.N. Shannon, Stockham Pipe Fitting Co.
- 1939-1940: Henry S. Washburn, Plainville Casting Co.
- 1938-1939: Marshall Post, Plainville Casting Co.
- 1937-1938: H. Bornstein, Deere & Co. John Deere
- 1936-1937: James Wick, Jr. Falcon Bronze Co.
- 1934-1936: Dan Avey, The Foundry
- 1933-1934: Frank Lanahan, Fort Pitt Malleable Iron Co.
- 1932-1933: T.S. Hammond, Whiting Corp.
- 1931-1932: E.H. Ballard, General Electric Co. General Electric
- 1930-1931: Nathaniel Patch, Lumen Bearing Co.
- 1929-1930: Fred Erb, Erb-Joyce Foundry Co.
- 1928-1929: S.T. Johnson, S. Obermayer Co.
- 1926-1928: S. Wells Utley, Detroit Steel Casting Co.
- 1925-1926: A.B. Root, Jr., Hunt-Spiller Manufacturing Co.
- 1924-1925: L.W. Olson, Ohio Brass Co.
- 1923-1924: G.H. Clamer, Ajax Metal Co.
- 1922-1923: C.R. Messinger, Chain Belt Co.
- 1920-1922: W.R. Bean, Eastern Malleable Iron Co.
- 1919-1920: Carl Koch, Fort Pitt Steel Casting Co.
- 1918-1919: A.O. Backert, Penton Publishing
- 1917-1918: B.D. Fuller, Westinghouse Electric Manufacturing
- 1916-1917: J.P. Pero, Missouri Malleable Iron Co.
- 1914-1916: Robert Bull, Commonwealth Steel Co.
- 1913-1914: Alfred Howell, Phillips & Buttorff Co.
- 1912-1913: Henry Miles, Buffalo Foundry & Machine
- 1910-1912: Major Joseph Speer, Pittsburgh Valve Foundry & Construction Co.
- 1909-1910: Arthur Waterfall, Russell Wheel & Foundry
- 1908-1909: L.L. Anthies, Anthes Foundry Ltd.
- 1907-1908: Stanley Flagg, Jr., Stanley G. Flagg & Co.
- 1906-1907: William McFadden, Mackintosh, Hemphill Co.
- 1905-1906: Thomas West, Thomas D. West Foundry
- 1904-1905: Chris Wolff, L. Wolff Manufacturing Co.
- 1903-1904: Willis Brown, Walker Foundry
- 1902-1903: A.W. Walker, Walker-Pratt Manufacturing Co.
- 1901-1902: John Sadlier, Springfield Foundry Co.
- 1900-1901: W. A. Jones, W.A. Jones Foundry & Machine Co.
- 1899-1900: Joseph S. Seaman, Seaman-Sleeth Co.
- 1898-1899: C.S. Bell, C.S. Bell Co.
- 1896-1898: Francis Schumann, Tacony Iron & Metal Co.

== Regional Activity ==
Regional Chapters organize educational events and hold chapter meetings, usually at monthly intervals, to promote technical or business subjects related to foundries and the foundry business.

== Journal ==
- International Journal of Metalcasting

== Related Industry Resources ==
- The Non-Ferrous Founders' Society
- American Iron and Steel Institute (AISI)
- Foundrylink
- American Iron and Steel Institute (AISI)
- Foundry-Planet
