= Draft (engineering) =

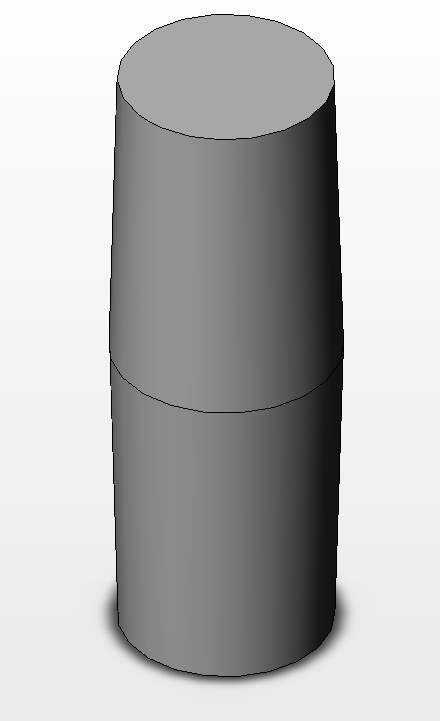
A cylinder with longitudinal draft

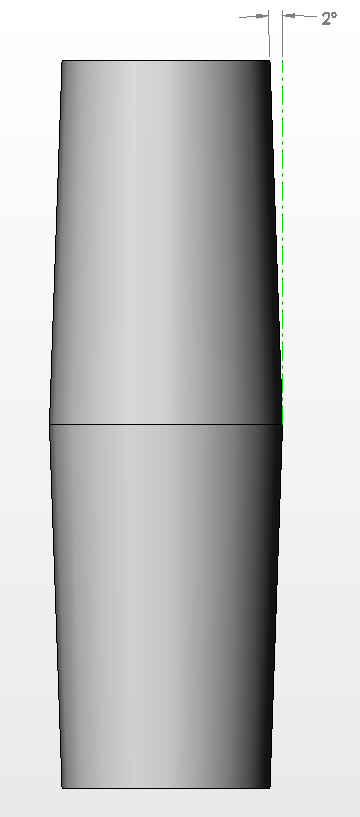
Profile view of a drafted cylinder with the draft dimension

In engineering, draft is the amount of taper for molded or cast parts perpendicular to the parting line. It can be measured in degrees or mm/mm (in/in).

Consider the fabrication of a hollow plastic box, without lid. Once the plastic has hardened around the mold, the mold must be removed. As the plastic hardens, it may contract slightly. By tapering the sides of the mold by an appropriate "draft angle", for instance 2° (two degrees), the mold will be easier to remove. This is a practice that is used, in applicable cases, when working with fiberglass.

If the mold is to be removed from the top, the box should taper in towards the bottom, such that measuring the bottom internal dimension will yield a smaller length and width than measuring the top from which the mold is extracted.

By specifying the opening length and width, a draft angle, and a depth, it is not necessary to specify the dimensions for the internal surface, as these may be calculated from the above.

The manufacture of a part that incorporates zero or negative angles may require a mold that can be separated into two or more parts, in order to release the casting.
