= Pattern (casting) =

Form used in casting to replicate a shape

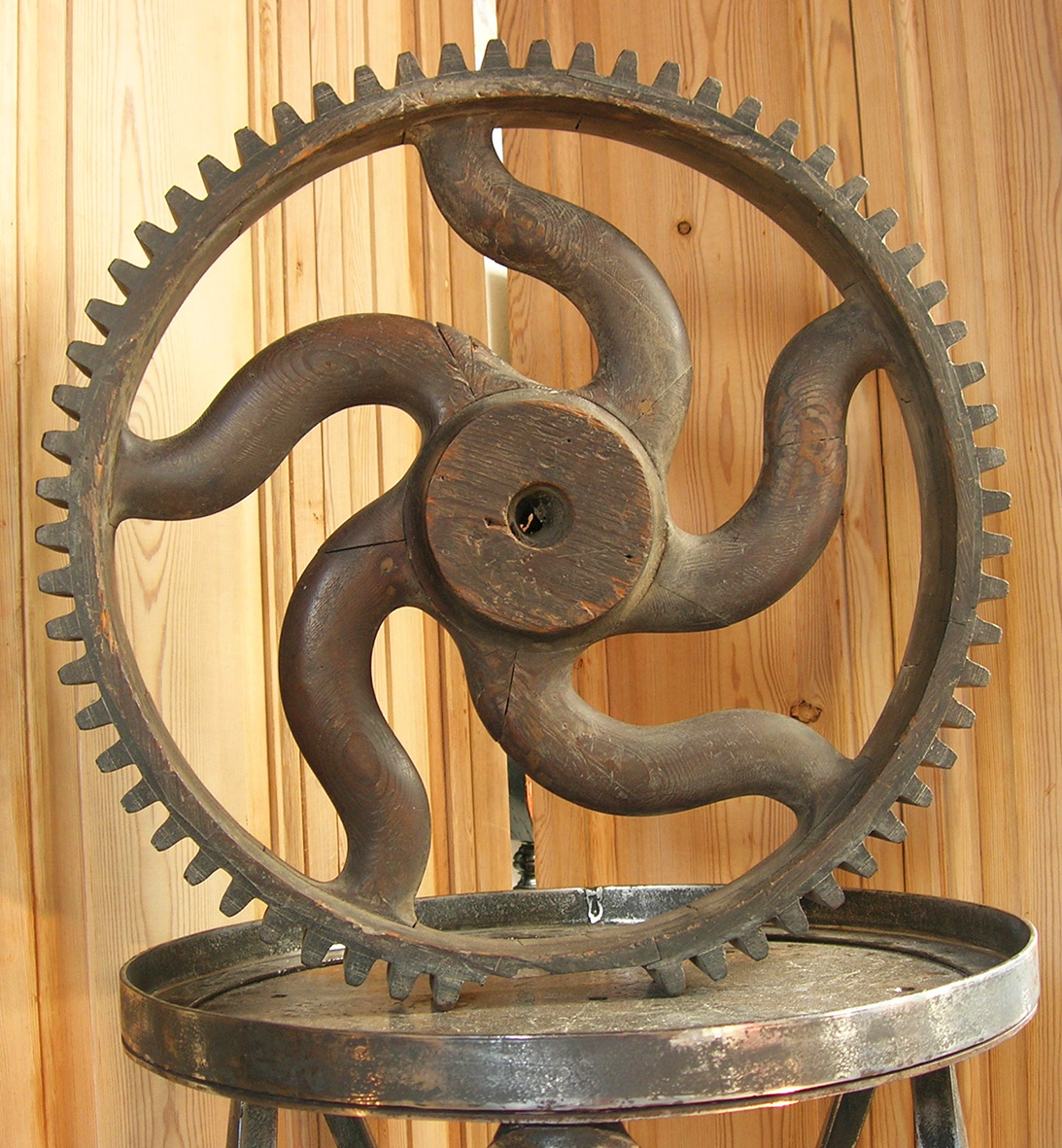
Wooden pattern for a cast-iron gear with curved spokes

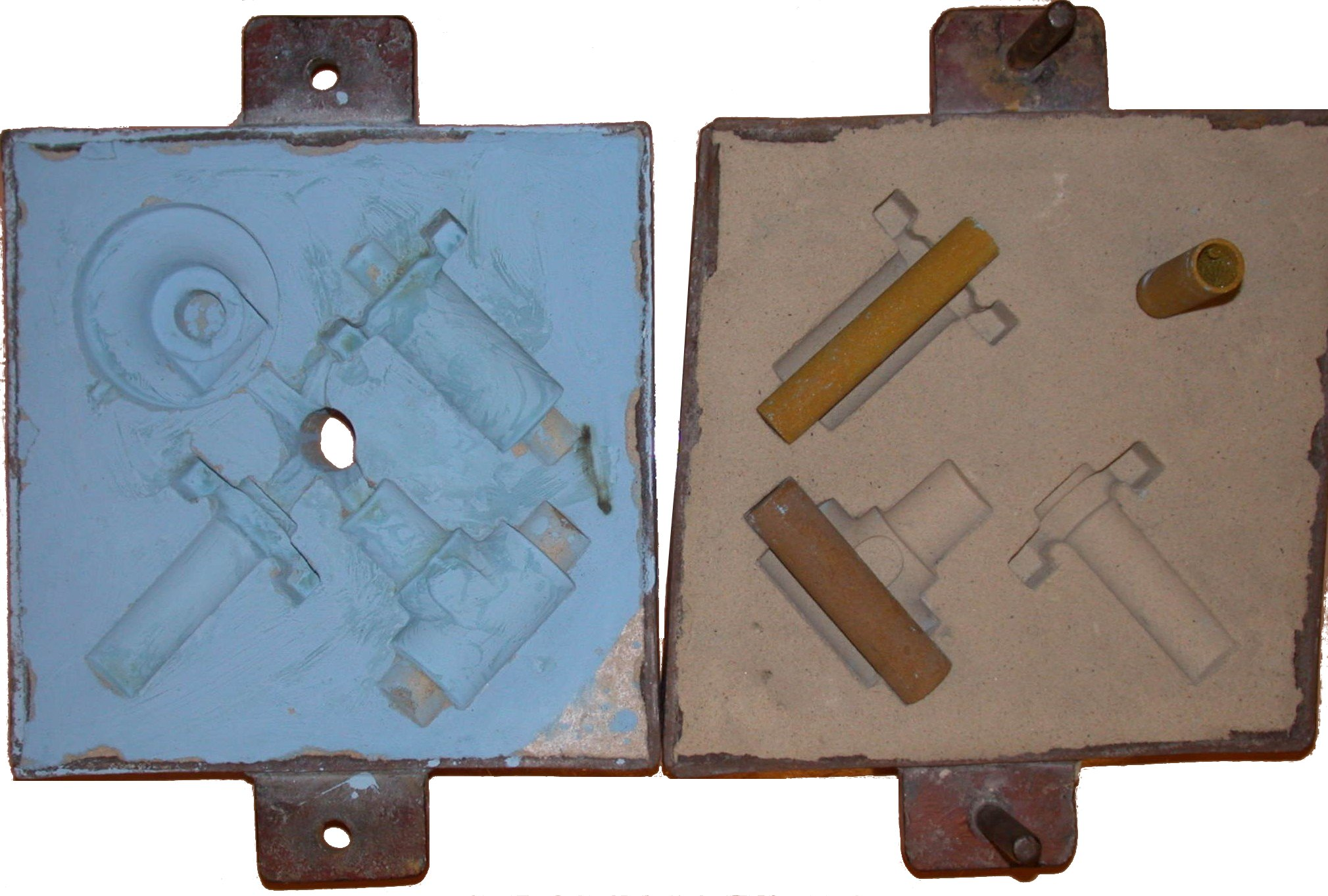
The top and bottom halves of a sand casting mould showing the cavity prepared by patterns. Cores to accommodate holes can be seen in the bottom half of the mould, which is called the drag. The top half of the mould is called the cope.

In casting, a pattern is a replica of the object to be cast, used to form the sand mould cavity into which molten metal is poured during the casting process. Once the pattern has been used to form the mould, the pattern is then removed and molten metal is poured into the cavity to produce the casting. The pattern is non-consumable and can be reused to produce further sand moulds almost indefinitely.

Due to the fact that almost all metals contract or shrink as their temperature falls, casting patterns must be made larger in size than the actual casting they will produce. Aluminium casting contraction is ~1.3% for example, so patternwork for a cast aluminium part would be made 1.3% bigger than the cast part itself.

Patterns used in sand casting may be made of wood, metal, plastics or other materials. Patterns are made to exacting standards of construction, so that they can last for a reasonable length of time, according to the quality grade of the pattern being built, and so that they will repeatably provide a dimensionally acceptable casting.

== Patternmaking ==
The making of patterns, called patternmaking (sometimes styled pattern-making or pattern making), is a skilled trade that is related to the trades of tool and die making and moldmaking, but also often incorporates elements of fine woodworking. Patternmakers (sometimes styled pattern-makers or pattern makers) learn their skills through apprenticeships and trade schools over many years of experience. Although an engineer may help to design the pattern, it is usually a patternmaker who executes the design.

== Materials used ==
Typically, materials used for pattern making are wood, metal or plastics. Wax and Plaster of Paris are also used, but only for specialized applications. Sugar pine wood is the most commonly used material for patterns, primarily because it is soft, light, and easy to work. Honduras mahogany was used for more production parts because it is harder and would last longer than pine. Once properly cured, it is about as stable as any wood available, not subject to warping or curling. Once the pattern is built, the foundry does not want it changing shape. True Honduras mahogany is harder to find now because of the decimation of the rain forests, so now there is a variety of woods marketed as mahogany. Fiberglass and plastic patterns have gained popularity in recent years because they are water proof and very durable. Metal patterns are long lasting and do not succumb to moisture, but they are heavier, more expensive and difficult to repair once damaged.

Wax patterns are used in an alternative casting process called investment casting. A combination of paraffin wax, bees wax and carnauba wax is used for this purpose. In this case the wax "pattern" is melted out from the mould cavity which is normally a rigid plaster like material rather than sand, so the wax "pattern" can only be used once.

Plaster of Paris is usually used in making master dies and molds, as it gains hardness quickly, with a lot of flexibility when in the setting stage.

== Design ==
=== Sprues, gates, risers, cores, and chills ===
The patternmaker or foundry engineer decides where the sprues, gating systems, and risers are placed with respect to the pattern. Where a hole is desired in a casting, a core may be used which defines a volume or location in a casting where metal will not flow into. Sometimes chills may be placed on a pattern surface prior to molding, which are then formed into the sand mould. Chills are heat sinks which enable localized rapid cooling. The rapid cooling may be desired to refine the grain structure or determine the freezing sequence of the molten metal which is poured into the mould. Because they are at a much cooler temperature, and often a different metal from what is being poured, they do not attach to the casting when the casting cools. The chills can then be reclaimed and reused.

The design of the feeding and gating system is usually referred to as methoding or methods design. It can be carried out manually, or interactively using general-purpose CAD software, or semi-automatically using special-purpose software (such as AutoCAST)

== Types of Patterns ==
Patterns are made of wood, metal, ceramic, or hard plastics and vary in complexity.

A single piece pattern, or loose pattern, is the simplest. It is a replica of the desired casting—usually in a slightly larger size to offset the contraction of the intended metal. Gated patterns connect a number of loose patterns together with a series of runners that will be detached after shake-out. Segmented or multi-piece patterns create a casting in several pieces to be joined in post-processing.

Match plate patterns are patterns with the top and bottom parts of the pattern, also known as the cope and drag portions, mounted on opposite sides of a board. This adaptation allows patterns to be quickly moulded out of the molding material. A similar technique called a cope and drag pattern is often used for large castings or large production runs: in this variation, the two sides of the pattern are mounted on separate pattern plates that can be hooked up to horizontal or vertical machines and moulded with the molding material. When the parting lines between the cope and drag are irregular, a follow board can be used to support irregularly shaped, loose patterns.

Sweep patterns are used for symmetric molds, which are contoured shapes rotated around a center axis or pole through the molding material. A sweep pattern is a form of skeleton pattern: any geometrical pattern that creates a mold by being moved through the molding material.

Skeleton pattern comes into play when the entire setup made of wood or metal is costlier. It is made usually as a part with some gaps left unfilled and those unfilled parts are filled or covered by loam sand or clays. Strickle board or Strike-off board is used to scrape the excess clay if applied to the gaps. E.g. Turbine Casing, Soil and Water pipe bends, valve bodies and boxes.

== Allowances ==
To compensate for any dimensional changes which will happen during the (solid) cooling process, allowances are usually made in the pattern.

=== Liquid Shrinkage ===
Almost all metals shrink volumetrically during solidification, this is known as liquid shrinkage. Another way of saying that is almost all metals undergo a volume increase upon melting, or liquidus temperature. Typical "volume shrinkage" is in the range between 3.5% to 10.0% depending on the alloy. Some graphitic cast irons, when cast in heavier sections, under well controlled conditions, can exhibit a slight positive yield. Type Metal is also known, and used, for its ability to hold a true and sharp cast, and retain correct dimensions after cooling. Normally when making engineering cast parts the "method" is designed along with the pattern - being the riser size, number of risers, and location of risers. Additionally downsprue(s), runner bar(s), and ingate(s) are also designed in "the method". The "method" thus ensures the molten metal is delivered, the mould filled correctly, and the risers filled to "feed" the "shrinking volume" of liquid to the casting during solidification. This "method" is done by a "methods engineer", who may be a patternmaker (with additional training), a founding engineer, or metallurgist who is familiar with concept of volume increase / volume loss associated with melting and casting / solidification. Example: Assume steel at 7.85 density (solid) and 6% shrinkage, or better said, a 6% volume increase when molten. A mould has been made to cast a 100 kg block, based on the solid density of steel. The liquid density of steel is only 94% that of its solid density value - about 7.38 when liquid. Thus when the 100 kg block (solid calculation) is filled with liquid it contains a mass of only 94 kg. The 6 kg, has to be supplied from a "riser" or "feeder" during solidification - thus the solid object now has a mass of 100 kg. The method is a system to deal with the volume loss during solidification. This (technically) is not an allowance.

This extra size that is given on the pattern for metal contraction is called "the contraction allowance". These values are typically between 0.6% and 2.5%. This is accounted for using a contraction rule, which is an oversized rule. Contraction rules are generally available for the common industrially cast alloys. Alternately, the Patternmaker will simply add a nominated percentage to all dimensions. An example of this allowance - if a bush were required to be 1500mm O/D, 1000mm I/D and 300mm high using a 2% contraction rule: The Patternmaker would make the pattern 1530mm O/D, (as it will contract in), 1020 I/D (as material tend to contract towards the centre or Centre of gravity ) - important to note that allowance is added even to the inside diameter as material tend to contact towards the centre. The core used is either made up of collapsible sand or it is given enough hollow space at the centre of the core to allow metal to expand. Finally, the height dimension would be 306mm.

The contraction amount can also be varied slightly by the sand system being used for the mould and any cores, for example clay-bonded sand, chemical bonded sands, or other bonding materials used within the sand. Exact values can vary between different foundries due to the sand systems being used. Each foundry, by gauging its own patterns and castings, can refine its own contraction allowances.

Shrinkage and Contraction can again be classified into liquid shrinkage and solid contraction. Liquid shrinkage is the reduction in volume during the process of solidification (liquid to solid), the liquid shrinkage is accounted for by risers. Solid contraction is the reduction in dimensions during the cooling of the (solid) cast metal. Contraction allowance takes into account only the solid contraction.

=== Draft allowance ===
When the pattern is to be removed from the sand mold, there is a possibility that any leading edges may break off, or get damaged in the process. To avoid this, a taper is provided on the pattern, so as to facilitate easy removal of the pattern from the mold, and hence reduce damage to edges. The taper angle provided is called the Draft angle. The value of the draft angle depends upon the complexity of the pattern, the type of molding (hand molding or machine molding), height of the surface, etc. Draft provided on the casting is usually 1 to 3 degrees on external surfaces (5 to 8 internal surfaces).

=== Finishing or Machining allowance ===
The surface finish obtained in sand castings is generally poor (dimensionally inaccurate), and hence in many cases, the cast product is subjected to machining processes like turning or grinding in order to improve the surface finish. During machining processes, some metal is removed from the piece. To compensate for this, a machining allowance (additional material some times referred to as green) should be given in the casting. the amount of finish allowance depends on the material of the casting, size of casting, volume of production, method of molding, etc.

=== Shake allowance ===
Usually during removal of the pattern from the mold cavity, the pattern is rapped all around the faces, in order to facilitate easy removal. In this process, the final cavity is enlarged. To compensate for this, the pattern dimensions need to be reduced. There are no standard values for this allowance, as it is heavily dependent on the personnel. This allowance is a negative allowance, and a common way of going around this allowance is to increase the draft allowance. Shaking of the pattern causes an enlargement of the mould cavity and results in a bigger casting.

=== Distortion allowance ===
During cooling of the mould, stresses developed in the solid metal may induce distortions in the cast. This is more evident when the mould is thinner in width as compared to its length. This can be eliminated by initially distorting the pattern in the opposite direction.

== Demand ==
Patterns continue to be needed for sand casting of metals. For the production of gray iron, ductile iron and steel castings, sand casting remains the most widely used process. For aluminum castings, sand casting represents about 12% of the total tonnage by weight (surpassed only by die casting at 57%, and semi-permanent and permanent mold at 19%; based on 2006 shipments). The exact process and pattern equipment is always determined by the order quantities and the casting design. Sand casting can produce as little as one part, or as many as a million copies.

Although additive manufacturing modalities such as SLS or SLM have potential to replace casting for some production situations, casting is still far from being completely displaced. Wherever it provides suitable material properties at competitive unit cost, it will remain in demand.
