= Flask (metal casting) =

Tooling to contain a mold in metal casting

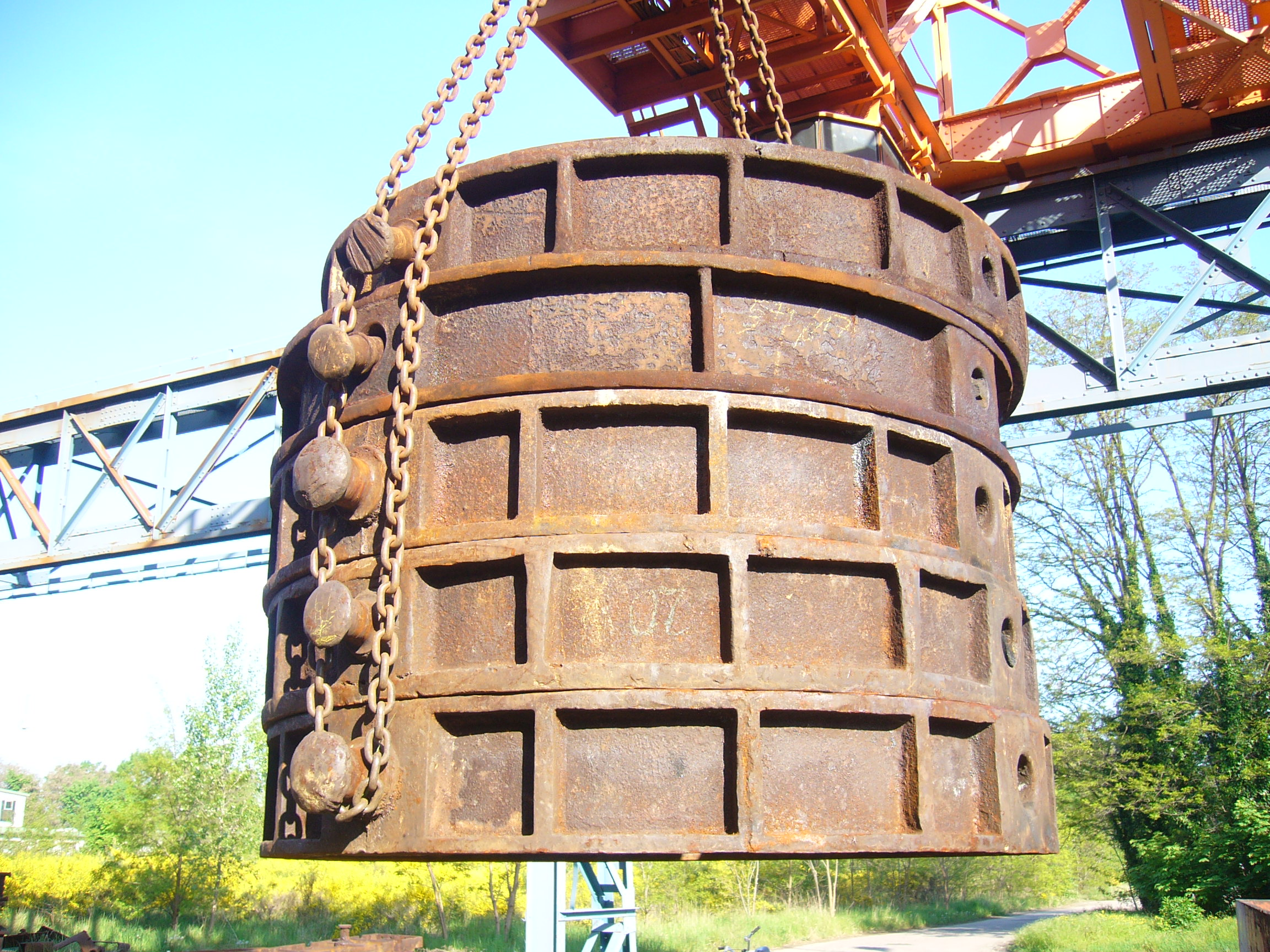
Round flasks

A flask is a type of tooling used to contain a mold in metal casting. A flask has only sides, and no top or bottom, and forms a frame around the mold, which is typically made of molding sand. The shape of a flask may be square, rectangular, round or any convenient shape. A flask can have any size so long as it is larger than the pattern being used to make the sand mold. Flasks are commonly made of steel, aluminum or even wood. A simple flask has two parts: the cope and the drag. More elaborate flasks may have three or even four parts.

== Flask design ==
Flasks are often designed with bars that extend to span two opposite sides. The bars act as reinforcement to the molding sand, which is relatively weak in tensile strength. The bars help support the sand through the molding and pouring operation.

Flasks are designed with an alignment or registration feature, so that the two flasks can be aligned to one another to ensure a casting can be more dimensionally accurate and also in small flasks, so that they cannot be fitted together the wrong way.

Flasks usually have handles or trunnions designed into their construction, which assist in handling the flasks with cranes or other lifting machinery.

Some flasks are used to form a mold and are removed before pouring the casting, so another mold can be made. Other flasks are designed to contain the mold through the pouring operation, and then the casting is shaken out of the mold. The flasks are then used again and again.

Flasks are usually (though not always) the property of the foundry making the casting. The number of available flasks of a given size can be a limiting factor in the overall production rate.
