= Lo-Ex =

Lo-Ex is an aluminium alloy with a very small thermal expansion co-efficient. It contains approximately 14 per cent silicon, 2 per cent nickel, and 1 per cent each of copper and magnesium.

== Applications ==
It has been used extensively and successfully over the years for all types of piston, including in Hillman Imp, and Terraplane engines.

LM13 is a related alloy in the Lo-Ex series, also widely used for diesel engine pistons. This alloy contains 12% silicon, 1% copper and 1% magnesium. Both of these alloys have also been used in a strengthened form, reinforced by an MMC or hybrid composite of alumina or zirconium ceramic fibres. These alloys have been worked by squeeze casting or stir casting.
