= Squeeze casting =

Casting method that applies very high pressure to the cooling metal

Squeeze casting is a casting method that combines die casting and forging. It starts with low-pressure casting, followed by the application of very high pressure as the material cools, producing a high-quality casting. This is often carried out using a hydraulic press as part of the casting apparatus.

Squeeze casting was originally created to make stronger metal parts for use in the construction and defense industries. The metal parts created by this process are more resistant to wear and heat and have historically been very expensive to produce. The market for these parts has grown to include the agricultural and automotive industries.

== History ==
Although several people have been credited with the creation of squeeze casting, the idea of squeeze casting (SC) was first patented in 1819 by Hollinggrak (27) and further developed by Chernov in 1878. Together, the team of scientists devised a new way to combine extremely high temperatures and 1.035 bar (15.000 psi) of pressure to reshape molten metal. Along the way, there were many drawbacks to this creation. Some problems they encountered included combining the exact temperature with the correct pressure in order to form the strongest metal. However, even with so many challenges, it was officially patented in 1994.

One of the greatest drawbacks that inventors of squeeze casting have encountered is the configuration of re-entrant cavities and internal passages that use the core. One of the possible solutions brought up was creating a core from conventional sand coring. Although this method seemed like a valid solution, the high temperatures from molten metal easily penetrated the core made from sand. Along the way, other inventors have also come up with different methods such as using traditional salt cores, but like sand coring, they are equally, if not more susceptible to stress and cracking.

When working with complex processes such as squeeze casting, balancing multiple performance and production factors can be challenging. For example, efforts to reduce component weight may lead to significant increases in manufacturing costs. In other cases, reducing squeeze cast production costs can result in castings with proportionally reduced mechanical strength. Despite these challenges, ongoing research and development have led engineers and manufacturers to refine and improve the process over time, resulting in the modern squeeze casting process used today.

== Creating squeeze casts ==
1. Heat metal to melting temperature
2. Inject into die and add 1.035 bar (15.000 psi) to shape molten metal
3. Heat over melting temperature
4. Extract material and rinse through water
5. Remove metal produced from the die to cool down

After getting through these challenges, the real benefits of these processes were discovered. Squeeze casting allows for the addition of an insulating layer around the metal core. This results in a layer that prevents the die cavity's heat from melting the core that is being produced. With the insulating layer intact, the construction of this core allows it to be more easily extracted all while leaving behind the protective-insulating layer. Moreover, through this process, a low-cost option of producing squeeze cores that is able to withstand high pressures has been made open to the public.

== Market ==
The product of this process has many practical applications but most of its uses lie in the defense industry. Squeeze cast parts are most frequently found in military vehicles because of their strength and durability in areas where it is needed most – this product has the strength to carry about 40 tonnes of pressure. Furthermore, another reason why it is used in so many markets is that it reduces 35% of the weight of most metals. Created just over fifteen years ago, the process continues to get better to a point where decreasing the price of production has become a priority.

== Patents ==
The patent for this product can be found on the list of google patents. There, it lists a clear description of each part integral to the function and process used to create squeeze-cast metals. For example, it describes what temperatures and pressures are required, what function each step serves, and how it relates to the whole process.

The original patent holder of squeeze casting was Cmi International Inc., but since then, there have been many patent transfers. All of which, have been companies competing in the same field for a greater share of the market. For example, Gibbs Die Casting Aluminum Corporation, Ube Industries Ltd and Mazda Motor Corporation are all multinational corporations that have contributed and competed for a share of the market. Lastly, even though there are many contenders in the market, most of the companies in this market have been attempting to improve these products by decreasing weight all while increasing the strength of these metals.
