= Silicon tombac =

Silicon tombac (German: Siliziumtombak) is an alloy made of copper (80%), zinc (16%) and silicon (4%).

== General properties ==
The silicon content leads to a strengthening of the metal matrix. The appearance is similar to ordinary brass. Silicon tombac has good friction bearing characteristics and is corrosion resistant but is not resistant to ammonia atmosphere. The strength properties are largely retained at application temperatures up to 200 °C. It is a special alloy in terms of the combination of casting process and casting temperature. In most cases, parts made of silicon tombac, are produced through the high pressure die casting process, which is normally specialized on metals with relatively low melting temperatures. But in this case the temperature melting range of silicon tombac is in the area of 950 to 1000 °C, which is relatively high for casting into permanent moulds. The advantage is the productivity of this highly automated casting process. The disadvantage is the temperature stress of the surface of the permanent mould, so that the lifetime of these moulds is limited.

== Comparison to investment cast steel parts ==
High pressure die cast silicon tombac is often used as an alternative for investment cast steel parts, because the mechanical strength is comparable (500 MPa), but the production process is more efficient. There can be found a break-even-point when comparing both processes, whereas the advantages of high pressure die casting regularly predominate at high unit numbers (for instance greater than 5000 units) to produce. This alloy has outstanding casting properties and good strength properties, which is required for the die casting process. It is often chosen for small to medium size parts in terms of casting metal volume. For large parts often investment casting of steels is applied because of the lower material cost.

== Metallurgical aspects ==
The silicon content limits the solubility of zinc in copper in the α-phase. In the given alloy the maximum amount of silicon at a very high zinc content is added. The consequence is that the α-phase crystallized silicon supersaturated when it comes to high cooling rates of the alloy. As a result the α-solid solution does not disintegrate, which leads to the described high mechanical properties.
