= Cryogenic deflashing =

Cryogenic deflashing is a deflashing process that uses cryogenic temperatures to aid in the removal of flash on cast or molded workpieces. These temperatures cause the flash to become stiff or brittle and to break away cleanly. Cryogenic deflashing is the preferred process when removing excess material from oddly shaped, custom molded products.

== Process ==
Parts are loaded into a parts basket. A cryogen, such as liquid nitrogen, is used to cool the workpieces; once cooled they are tumbled and blasted with media pellets, ranging size from 0.006 to 0.080 inches (0.15 to 2.03 mm). In some instances, cryogenic deflashing does not utilize a blasting action, relying instead only on the tumbling of the parts to remove flash on the outer edges.

== Advantages ==
Cryogenic deflashing provides various advantages over manual deflashing and other traditional deflashing methods.

- The process maintains part integrity and critical tolerances.
- Since it is a batch process, the price per piece is far less as many more parts can be processed in a given amount of time.
- Cryogenic deflashing extends mold life. Rather than replace or repair a mold (which typically involves downtime and high cost), the parts can be deflashed. This is typical of parts molded at the end of their product lifetime.
- The process is computer controlled, therefore removing the human operator variable from the process.
- The process offers consistent results from lot to lot.
- Cryogenic deflashing is non-abrasive.
- The cost per part is generally well below any alternative technique.

== Applications ==
A wide range of molded materials can utilize cryogenic deflashing with proven results. These include:

- Silicones
- Plastics – (both thermoset & thermoplastic)
- Rubbers – (including neoprene & urethane)
- Liquid-crystal polymer (LCP)
- Glass-filled nylons
- Aluminum zinc die cast

Examples of applications that use cryogenic deflashing include:

- O-rings & gaskets
- Catheters and other in-vitro medical
- Insulators and other electric / electronic
- Valve stems, washers and fittings
- Tubes and flexible boots
- Face masks & goggles

Today, many molding operations are using cryogenic deflashing instead of rebuilding or repairing molds on products that are approaching their end-of-life. It is often more prudent and economical to add a few cents of production cost for a part than invest in a new molding tool that can cost hundreds of thousands of dollars and has a limited service life due to declining production forecasts.

In other cases, cryogenic deflashing has proven to be an enabling technology, permitting the economical manufacture of high quality, high precision parts fabricated with cutting edge materials and compounds.
