= Parting line =

Line where the two halves of a bearing meet

A parting line, in industrial casting of molds, is the border line between the two halves of the mold (known as the “core” and the “cavity.”).

Parting lines are clearly visible on both moulded products and the moulds that produced them. In moulded products, the parting lines show as flash -- the thin line of excess material left at the parting line. Many molders will repair or even replace the mold tooling so that the parting line flash is reduced to an acceptable tolerance or eliminated altogether. Secondary operations to remove parting line flash include hand trimming, vibratory tumbling, media blasting and cryogenic deflashing.

The parting line is sometimes a starting point for the mold parting surface.

In engineering drawing, a parting line is often abbreviated as PL.

ASME's Y14.8 standard specifies a symbol for parting line. Engineering applications (seals, tight running molded parts) that require precision for shape control, call for removal of flashes.
