= Brass =

Alloy of copper and zinc

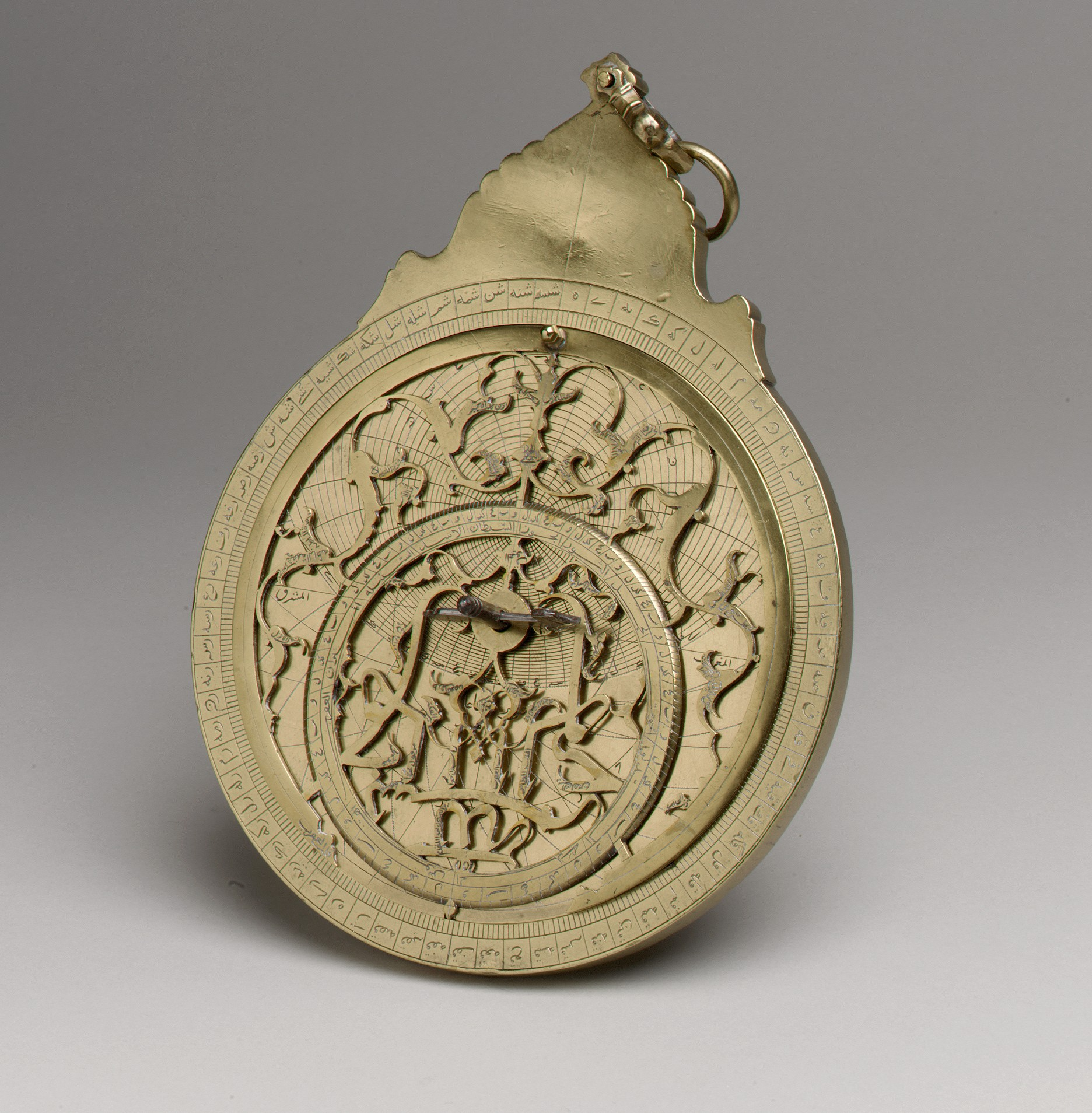
Islamic Golden Age brass astrolabe

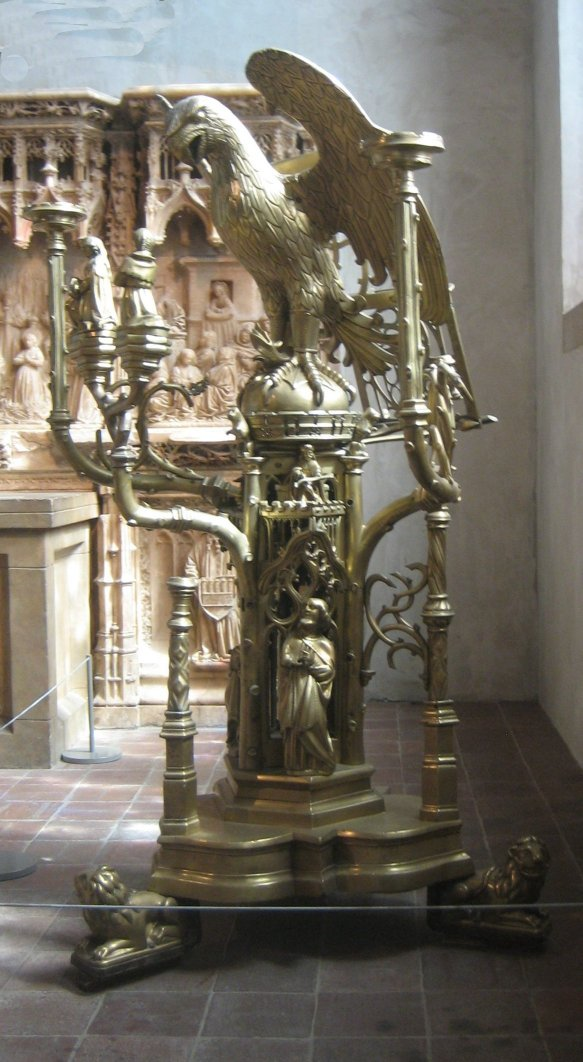
Brass lectern with an eagle, attributed to Aert van Tricht, Limburg (Netherlands), circa 1500

Brass is an alloy of copper and zinc, in proportions which can be varied to achieve different colours and mechanical, electrical, acoustic, and chemical properties but are generally greater in copper by 2:1. In use since prehistoric times, it is a substitutional alloy: atoms of the two constituents may replace each other within the same crystal structure.

Brass is similar to bronze, a copper alloy that contains tin instead of zinc. Both bronze and brass may include small amounts of a range of other elements, including arsenic, lead, phosphorus, aluminium, manganese, silicon, and (in marine brass) tin. Historically, the distinction between the two alloys has been inconsistent, and increasingly museums use the more general term "copper alloy".

Brass has long been popular for its bright, golden appearance and used for cabinetry and furniture fittings such as drawer pulls, hinges, and doorknobs. It has also been widely used for sculpture and utensils because of its low melting point, high workability (both with hand tools and with modern turning and milling machines), durability, and electrical and thermal conductivity. Brasses with higher copper content are softer and more golden coloured; conversely, those with less copper and more zinc are harder and more silvery.

Brass is commonly used in applications where corrosion resistance and low friction are required, such as locks, hinges, gears, bearings, ammunition casings, zippers, plumbing, hose couplings, valves, scuba regulators, and electrical plugs and sockets. It is used extensively for musical instruments such as horns and bells. The composition of brass makes it a favorable substitute for copper in costume and fashion jewelry, as it exhibits greater resistance to corrosion.

Brass is not as hard as bronze, so is not suitable for most weapons and tools. It is also not suitable for marine usage, as the zinc will be leached from the alloy by reacting with minerals in salt water, leaving the porous copper behind. Marine brass, a kind with added tin, avoids this dealloying transformation, as does bronze.

Brass is often used in equipment that must be non-sparking, such as fittings and tools used near flammable or explosive materials.

== Properties ==
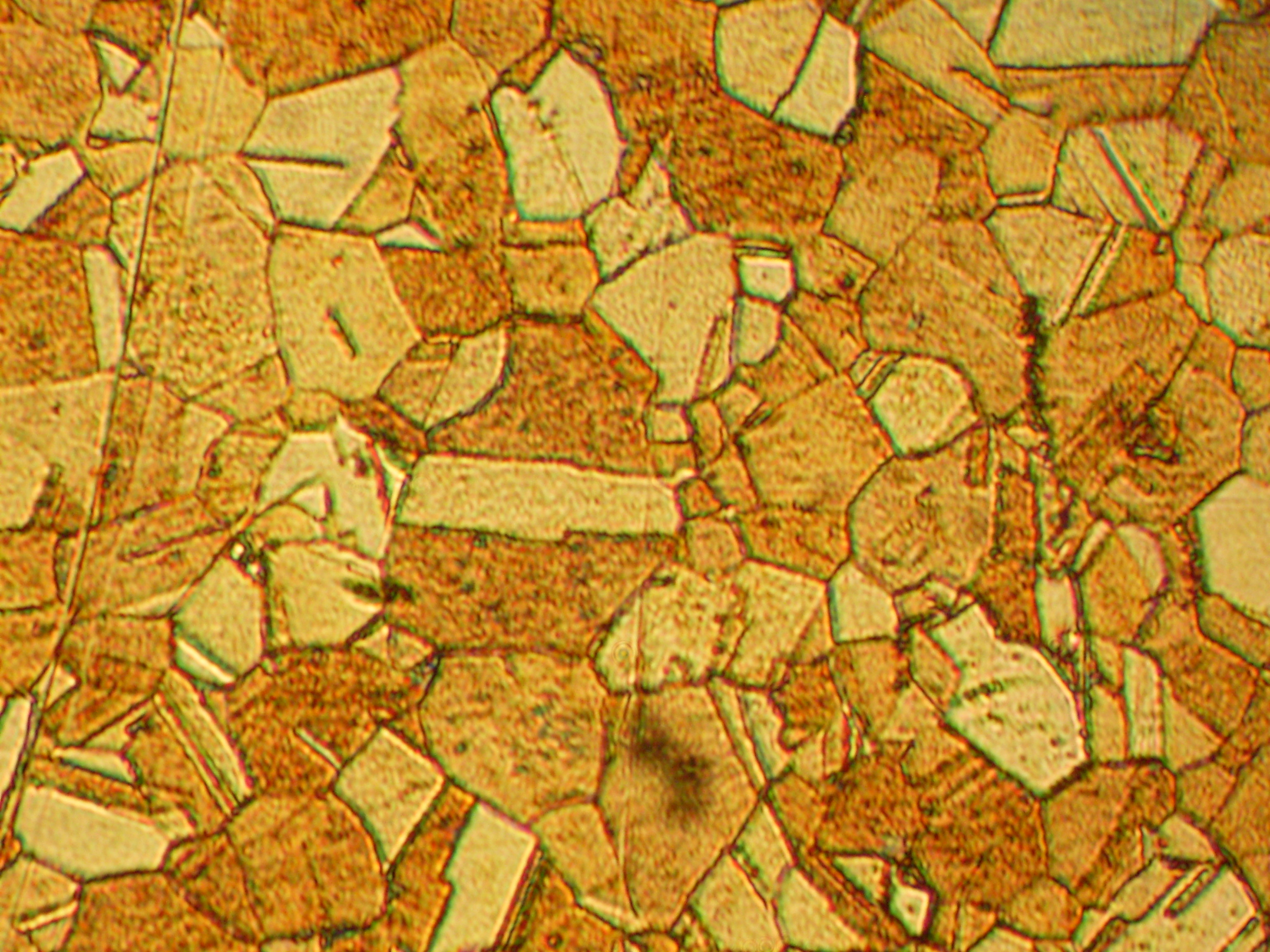
Microstructure of rolled and annealed brass (400× magnification)

Brass is more malleable than bronze or zinc. The relatively low melting point of brass (900 to 940 °C; 1,650 to 1,720 °F, depending on composition) and its flow characteristics make it a relatively easy material to cast. By varying the proportions of copper and zinc, the properties of the brass can be changed, allowing hard and soft brasses. The density of brass is 8.4 to 8.73 g/cm^{3} (0.303 to 0.315 lb/cu in).

Today, almost 90% of all brass alloys are recycled. Because brass is not ferromagnetic, ferrous scrap can be separated from it by passing the scrap near a powerful magnet. Brass scrap is melted and recast into billets that are extruded into the desired form and size. The general softness of brass means that it can often be machined without the use of cutting fluid, but with exceptions.

Aluminium makes brass stronger and more corrosion-resistant. It also causes a highly beneficial hard layer of aluminium oxide (Al_{2}O_{3}) to be formed on the surface that is thin, transparent, and self-healing. Tin has a similar effect and finds its use especially in seawater applications (naval brasses). Combinations of iron, aluminium, silicon, and manganese make brass wear- and tear-resistant. The addition of as little as 1% iron to a brass alloy results in an alloy with a noticeable magnetic attraction.

Binary phase diagram

Brass corrodes in the presence of moisture, chlorides, acetates, ammonia, and certain acids. This often happens when the copper reacts with sulfur to form a brown and eventually black surface layer of copper sulfide, which if regularly exposed to slightly acidic water such as urban rainwater, can then oxidize in air to form a patina of green-blue copper carbonate. Depending on how the patina layer was formed, it may protect the underlying brass from further damage.

Although copper and zinc have a large difference in electrical potential, the resulting brass alloy does not experience internalized galvanic corrosion because of the absence of a corrosive environment within the mixture. However, if brass is placed in contact with a "more" noble metal such as silver or gold in such an environment, the brass will corrode galvanically; conversely, if brass is in contact with a "less" noble metal such as zinc or iron, the less noble metal will corrode and the brass will be protected.

== Lead content ==
To enhance the machinability of brass, lead is often added in concentrations of about 2%. Since lead has a lower melting point than the other constituents of the brass, it tends to migrate towards the grain boundaries in the form of globules as it cools from casting. The pattern the globules form on the surface of the brass increases the available lead surface area, which in turn, affects the degree of leaching. In addition, cutting operations can smear the lead globules over the surface. These effects can lead to significant lead leaching from brasses of comparatively low lead content.

=== Regulations, California, US ===
In October 1999, the California attorney general sued 13 key manufacturers and distributors over lead content. In laboratory tests, state researchers found the average brass key, new or old, exceeded the California Proposition 65 limits by an average factor of 19, assuming handling twice a day. In April 2001, manufacturers agreed to reduce lead content to 1.5%, or face a requirement to warn consumers about lead content. Keys plated with other metals are not affected by the settlement, and may continue to use brass alloys with a higher percentage of lead content.

Also in California, lead-free materials must be used for "each component that comes into contact with the wetted surface of pipes and pipe fittings, plumbing fittings and fixtures". On 1 January 2010, the maximum amount of lead in "lead-free brass" in California was reduced from 4.0 to 0.25% lead.

== Corrosion-resistant brass for harsh environments ==
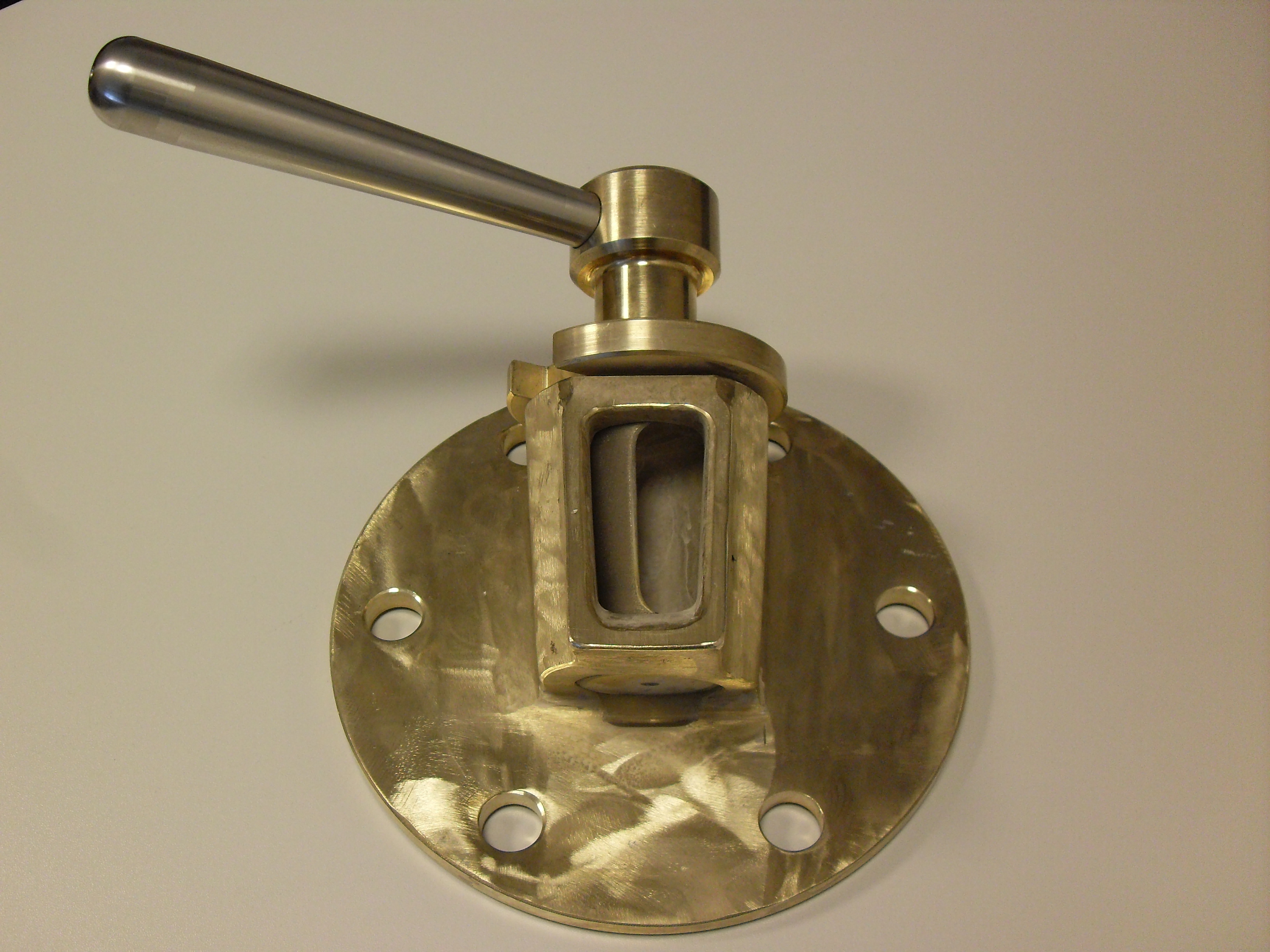
Brass sampling cock with stainless steel handle

Dezincification-resistant (DZR or DR) brasses, sometimes referred to as CR (corrosion resistant) brasses, are used where the risk of corrosion is large and where normal brasses do not meet the requirements. Applications with high water temperatures, chlorides present, or deviating water qualities (soft water) play a role. For example, DZR-brass is used in water boiler systems. This brass alloy must be produced with great care, with special attention placed on a balanced composition and proper production temperatures and parameters to avoid long-term failures.

An example of DZR brass is C352 brass, with about 30% zinc, 61–63% copper, 1.7–2.8% lead, and 0.02–0.15% arsenic. The lead and arsenic significantly suppress zinc loss.

"Red brasses", a family of alloys with high copper proportion and generally less than 15% zinc, are more resistant to zinc loss. One of the metals called red brass is 85% copper, 5% tin, 5% lead, and 5% zinc. Copper alloy C23000, which is also known as red brass, contains 84–86% copper and 0.05% each iron and lead, with the balance being zinc.

Another such material is gunmetal, from the family of red brasses. Gunmetal alloys contain roughly 88% copper, 8–10% tin, and 2–4% zinc. Lead can be added for ease of machining or for bearing alloys.

"Naval brass", for use in seawater, contains 40% zinc, but also 1% tin. The tin addition suppresses zinc leaching.

The NSF International requires brasses with more than 15% zinc, used in piping and plumbing fittings, to be dezincification-resistant.

== Use in musical instruments ==
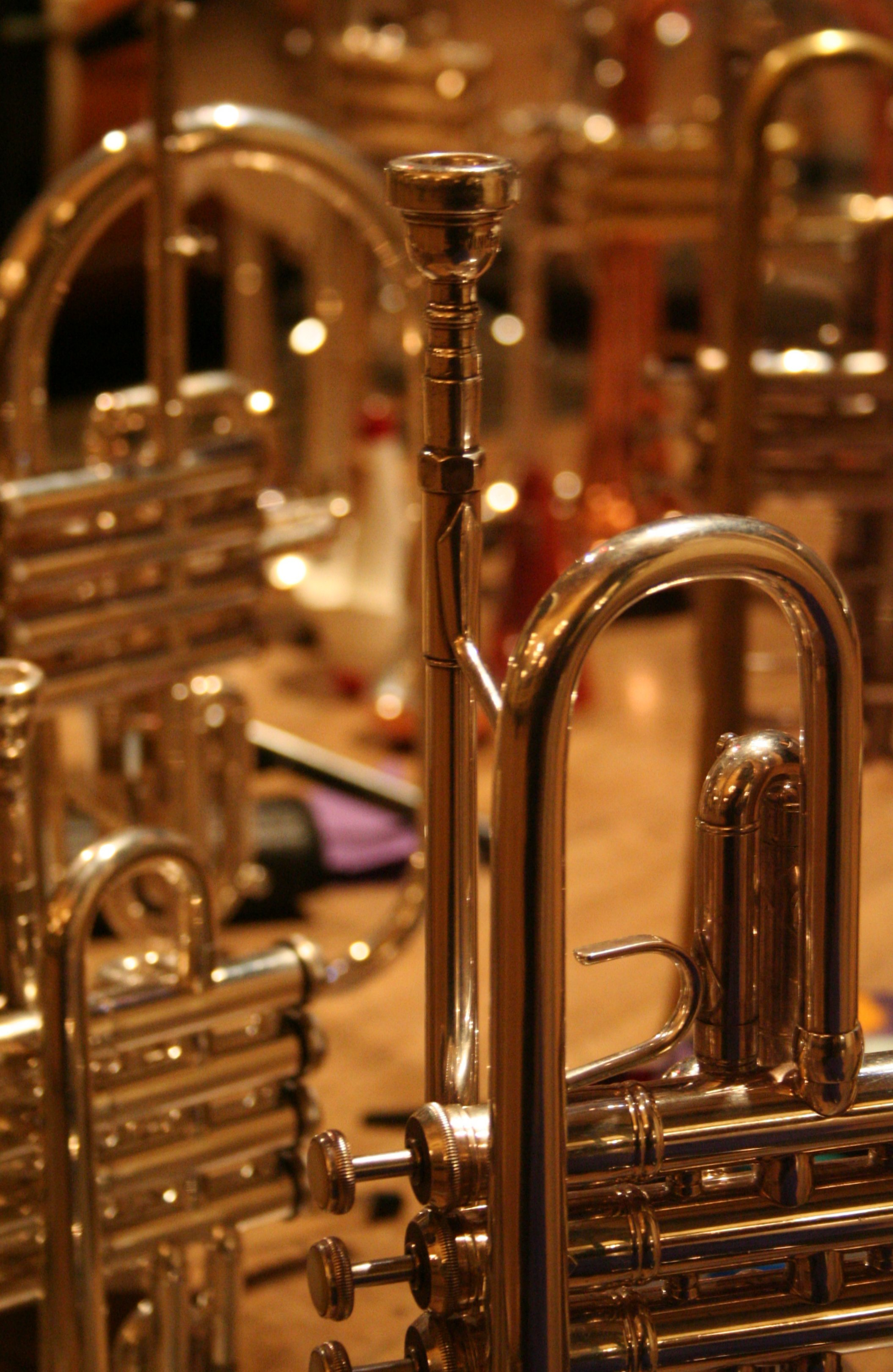
A collection of brass instruments

The high malleability and workability, relatively good resistance to corrosion, and traditionally attributed acoustic properties of brass, have made it the usual metal of choice for construction of musical instruments whose acoustic resonators consist of long, relatively narrow tubing, often folded or coiled for compactness; silver and its alloys, and even gold, have been used for the same reasons, but brass is the most economical choice. Collectively known as brass instruments, or simply "the brass", these include the trombone, tuba, trumpet, cornet, flugelhorn, baritone horn, euphonium, tenor horn, and French horn, and many other "horns", many in variously sized families, such as the saxhorns.

Other wind instruments may be constructed of brass or other metals, and indeed most modern student-model flutes and piccolos are made of some variety of brass, usually a cupronickel alloy similar to nickel silver (also known as German silver). Clarinets, especially low clarinets such as the contrabass and subcontrabass, are sometimes made of metal because of limited supplies of the dense, fine-grained tropical hardwoods traditionally preferred for smaller woodwinds. For the same reason, some low clarinets, bassoons, and contrabassoons feature a hybrid construction, with long, straight sections of wood, and curved joints, neck, and/or bell of metal. The use of metal also avoids the risks of exposing wooden instruments to changes in temperature or humidity, which can cause sudden cracking. Though the saxophones and sarrusophones are classified as woodwind instruments, they are normally made of brass for similar reasons, and because their wide, conical bores and thin-walled bodies are more easily and efficiently made by forming sheet metal than by machining wood.

The keywork of most modern woodwinds, including wooden-bodied instruments, is also usually made of an alloy such as nickel silver. Such alloys are stiffer and more durable than the brass used to construct the instrument bodies, but still workable with simple hand tools—a boon to quick repairs. The mouthpieces of both brass instruments and, less commonly, woodwind instruments are often made of brass among other metals as well.

Next to the brass instruments, the most notable use of brass in music is in various percussion instruments, most notably cymbals, gongs, and orchestral (tubular) bells (large "church" bells are normally made of bronze). Small handbells and "jingle bells" are also commonly made of brass.

The harmonica is a free reed aerophone, also often made from brass. In organ pipes of the reed family, brass strips (called tongues) are used as the reeds, which beat against the shallot (or beat "through" the shallot in the case of a "free" reed). Although not part of the brass section, snare drums are also sometimes made of brass. Some parts on electric guitars are also made from brass, especially inertia blocks on tremolo systems for its tonal properties, and for string nuts and saddles for both tonal properties and its low friction.

== Germicidal and antimicrobial applications ==
The bactericidal properties of brass have been observed for centuries, particularly in marine environments where it prevents biofouling. Depending upon the type and concentration of pathogens and the medium they are in, brass kills these microorganisms within a few minutes to hours of contact.

A large number of independent studies confirm this antimicrobial effect, even against antibiotic-resistant bacteria such as MRSA and VRSA. The mechanisms of antimicrobial action by copper and its alloys, including brass, are a subject of intense and ongoing investigation.

== Season cracking ==
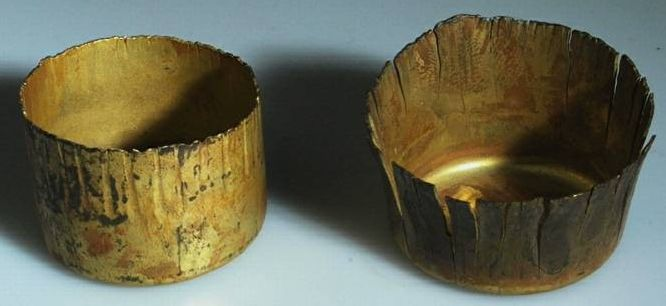
Cracking in brass caused by ammonia attack

Brass is susceptible to stress corrosion cracking, especially from ammonia or substances containing or releasing ammonia. The problem is sometimes known as season cracking after it was first discovered in brass cartridges used for rifle ammunition during the 1920s in the British Indian Army. The problem was caused by high residual stresses from cold forming of the cases during manufacture, together with chemical attack from traces of ammonia in the atmosphere. The cartridges were stored in stables and the ammonia concentration rose during the hot summer months, thus initiating brittle cracks. The problem was resolved by annealing the cases, and storing the cartridges elsewhere.

== Types ==
Class	Proportion by weight (%)		Notes
Class	Copper	Zinc	Notes
Alpha brasses	> 65	< 35	Alpha brasses are malleable, can be worked cold, and are used in pressing, forging, or similar applications. They contain only one phase, with face-centred cubic crystal structure. With their high proportion of copper, these brasses have a more golden hue than others. The alpha phase is a substitution solid solution of zinc in copper. It is close in properties to copper, tough, strong, and somewhat difficult to machine. Best formability is with 32% of zinc. Corrosion-resistant red brasses, with 15% of zinc or less, belong here.
Alpha-beta brasses	55–65	35–45	Also called duplex brasses, these are suited for hot working. They contain both α and β' phases; the β'-phase is ordered body-centred cubic, with zinc atoms in the centre of the cubes, and is harder and stronger than α. Alpha-beta brasses are usually worked hot. The higher proportion of zinc means these brasses are brighter than alpha brasses. At 45% of zinc the alloy has the highest strength.
Beta brasses	50–55	45–50	Beta brasses can only be worked hot, and are harder, stronger, and suitable for casting. The high zinc-low copper content means these are some of the brightest and least-golden of the common brasses.
White brass	< 50	> 50	These are too brittle for general use. The term may also refer to certain types of nickel silver alloys as well as Cu-Zn-Sn alloys with high proportions (typically 40%+) of tin and/or zinc, as well as predominantly zinc casting alloys with copper additives. These have virtually no yellow colouring at all, and instead have a much more silvery appearance.
Gamma brasses	33–39	61–67	There are also Ag-Zn and Au-Zn gamma brasses, Ag 30–50%, Au 41%. The gamma phase is a cubic-lattice intermetallic compound, Cu_{5}Zn_{8}.

Other phases than α, β and γ are ε, a hexagonal intermetallic CuZn_{3}, and η, a solid solution of copper in zinc.

=== Brass alloys ===
Alloy name	Proportion by weight (%) Copper, - Zinc - , - Tin - , Lead -				Other	Notes
Alloy name	Copper	Zinc	Tin	Lead	Other	Notes
Abyssinian gold (Commercial bronze [C220])	90	10				
Admiralty brass	69	30	1			Tin inhibits loss of zinc in many environments.
Aich's alloy	60.66	36.58	1.02		1.74% iron	Designed for use in marine service owing to its corrosion resistance, hardness and toughness. A characteristic application is to the protection of ships' bottoms, but more modern methods of cathodic protection have rendered its use less common. Its appearance resembles that of gold.
Aluminium brass	77.5	20.5			2% aluminium	Aluminium improves corrosion resistance. It is used for heat exchanger and condenser tubes.
Arsenical brass					Arsenic; frequently aluminium	Used for boiler fireboxes.
Arsenical brass 259	70	29.5		≤0.05	Arsenic 0.2-0.6, Iron ≤0.05	Heat exchangers, plumbing requiring excellent corrosion resistance in water.
Brastil	-	-	-	-	Copper, Silicon, Zinc	An alloy of copper, zinc, and silicon which has an incredibly high tensile strength and is corrosion resistant. Doehler Die Casting Co. of Toledo, Ohio were known for the production of Brastil. It was notably tested in 1932 on an M1911 pistol as it was cheaper than steel at the time as a cost-effective measure.
California lead-free brass				< 0.25		Defined by California Assembly Bill AB 1953 contains "not more than 0.25 percent lead content". Prior upper limit was 4%.
Cartridge brass (C260)	70	30	—	≤ 0.07		Good cold working properties. Used for ammunition cases, plumbing, and hardware. Also, used in token coins as alloy C260.
Common brass	63	37				Also called rivet brass. Cheap and standard for cold working.
DZR brass					Arsenic	Dezincification resistant brass with a small percentage of arsenic.
Delta metal	55	41–43			1–3% iron with the balance consisting of various other metals.	The proportions used make the material harder and suitable for valves and bearings.
Free machining brass (C360)	61.5	35.5		2.5–3.7	0.35% iron	Also called 360 or C360 brass. High machinability.
Gilding metal	95	5				Softest type of brass commonly available. Gilding metal is typically used for ammunition bullet "jackets"; e.g., full metal jacket bullets. Almost red in colour.
Gunmetal	88	2-4	8-10			E.g. British Admiralty gunmetal. Has variations. (also may be classified as a bronze alloy due to its high tin content and low proportion of zinc)
High brass	65	35				Has a high tensile strength and is used for springs, screws, and rivets.
Leaded brass				> 0		An alpha-beta brass with an addition of lead for improved machinability.
Low brass	80	20				Light golden colour, very ductile; used for flexible metal hoses and metal bellows.
Manganese brass	77	12			7% manganese, 4% nickel	Used as cladding for United States "golden" dollar coins. Other manganese brass alloy compositions exist.
Muntz metal	60	40			Traces of iron	Used as a lining on boats.
Naval brass (C464)	59	40	1			Similar to admiralty brass. Also known as Tobin bronze, 464, or C464.
Naval brass, high lead (C485)	60.5	37.5	1.8	0.7		Naval brass with added lead for machinability. Also known as 485, or C485.
Nickel brass	70–76	20–24.5			4–5.5% nickel	The outer ring of the bi-metallic one pound and two pound sterling coins and the one euro coin, plus the centre part of the two euro coin. Formerly used for the round one pound coin.
Nordic gold	89	5	1		5% aluminum	Used in 10, 20, and 50 cent euro coins.
Orichalcum	75-80	15-20		Trace	Trace amounts of nickel and iron	Determined from 39 ingots recovered from an ancient shipwreck in Gela, Sicily.
Pinchbeck	89% or 93%	11% or 7%				Invented in the early 18th century by Christopher Pinchbeck. Resembles gold to a point where people can buy the metal as budget gold "effect" jewelry.
Prince's metal	75	25				A type of alpha brass. Due to its yellow colour, it is used as an imitation of gold. Also called Prince Rupert's metal, the alloy was named after Prince Rupert of the Rhine.
Ounce metal	85	5	5	5		Sometimes called "red brass"
Alloy C23000	84–85.9	14-16		minimum 0.07%	minimum 0.05% iron	Sometimes called "red brass"
Red brass, Rose brass (C230)	85	5	5	5		Both an American term for the copper-zinc-tin alloy known as gunmetal, and an alloy which is considered both a brass and a bronze. It is also used to make token coins. Red brass is also an alternative name for copper alloy C23000, which is composed of 14–16% zinc, a minimum 0.05% iron and minimum 0.07% lead content, and the remainder copper. It may also refer to ounce metal (Cu 85.0, Zn 5.0, Pb 5.0, Sn 5.0).
Rich low brass, Tombac	80-97	5–20				Often used in jewelry applications. Many variations.
Silicon tombac	80	16			4% silicon	Used as an alternative for investment cast steel parts.
Tonval brass				> 0		Also called CW617N or CZ122 or OT58. It is not recommended for sea water use, being susceptible to dezincification.
Yellow brass	67	33				An American term for 33% zinc brass.

== History ==
Although forms of brass have been in use since prehistory, its true nature as a copper-zinc alloy was not understood until the post-medieval period because the zinc vapor which reacted with copper to make brass was not recognized as a metal. The King James Bible makes many references to "brass" to translate "nechosheth" (bronze or copper) from Hebrew to English. The earliest brasses may have been natural alloys made by smelting zinc-rich copper ores. By the Roman period brass was being deliberately produced from metallic copper and zinc minerals using the cementation process, the product of which was calamine brass, and variations on this method continued until the mid-19th century. It was eventually replaced by speltering, the direct alloying of copper and zinc metal which was introduced to Europe in the 16th century.

Brass has sometimes historically been referred to as "yellow copper".

=== Early copper-zinc alloys ===
In West Asia and the Eastern Mediterranean early copper-zinc alloys are now known in small numbers from a number of 3rd millennium BC sites in the Aegean, Iraq, the United Arab Emirates, Kalmykia, Turkmenistan and Georgia and from 2nd millennium BC sites in western India, Uzbekistan, Iran, Syria, Iraq and Canaan. Isolated examples of copper-zinc alloys are known in China from the 1st century AD, long after bronze was widely used.

The compositions of these early "brass" objects are highly variable and most have zinc contents of between 5% and 15% wt which is lower than in brass produced by cementation. These may be "natural alloys" manufactured by smelting zinc rich copper ores in redox conditions. Many have similar tin contents to contemporary bronze artefacts and it is possible that some copper-zinc alloys were accidental and perhaps not even distinguished from copper. However the large number of copper-zinc alloys now known suggests that at least some were deliberately manufactured and many have zinc contents of more than 12% wt which would have resulted in a distinctive golden colour.

By the 8th–7th century BC Assyrian cuneiform tablets mention the exploitation of the "copper of the mountains" and this may refer to "natural" brass. "Oreikhalkon" (mountain copper), the Ancient Greek translation of this term, was later adapted to the Latin aurichalcum meaning "golden copper" which became the standard term for brass. In the 4th century BC Plato knew orichalkos as rare and nearly as valuable as gold and Pliny describes how aurichalcum had come from Cypriot ore deposits which had been exhausted by the 1st century AD. X-ray fluorescence analysis of 39 orichalcum ingots recovered from a 2,600-year-old shipwreck off Sicily found them to be an alloy made with 75–80% copper, 15–20% zinc and small percentages of nickel, lead and iron.

=== Roman world ===
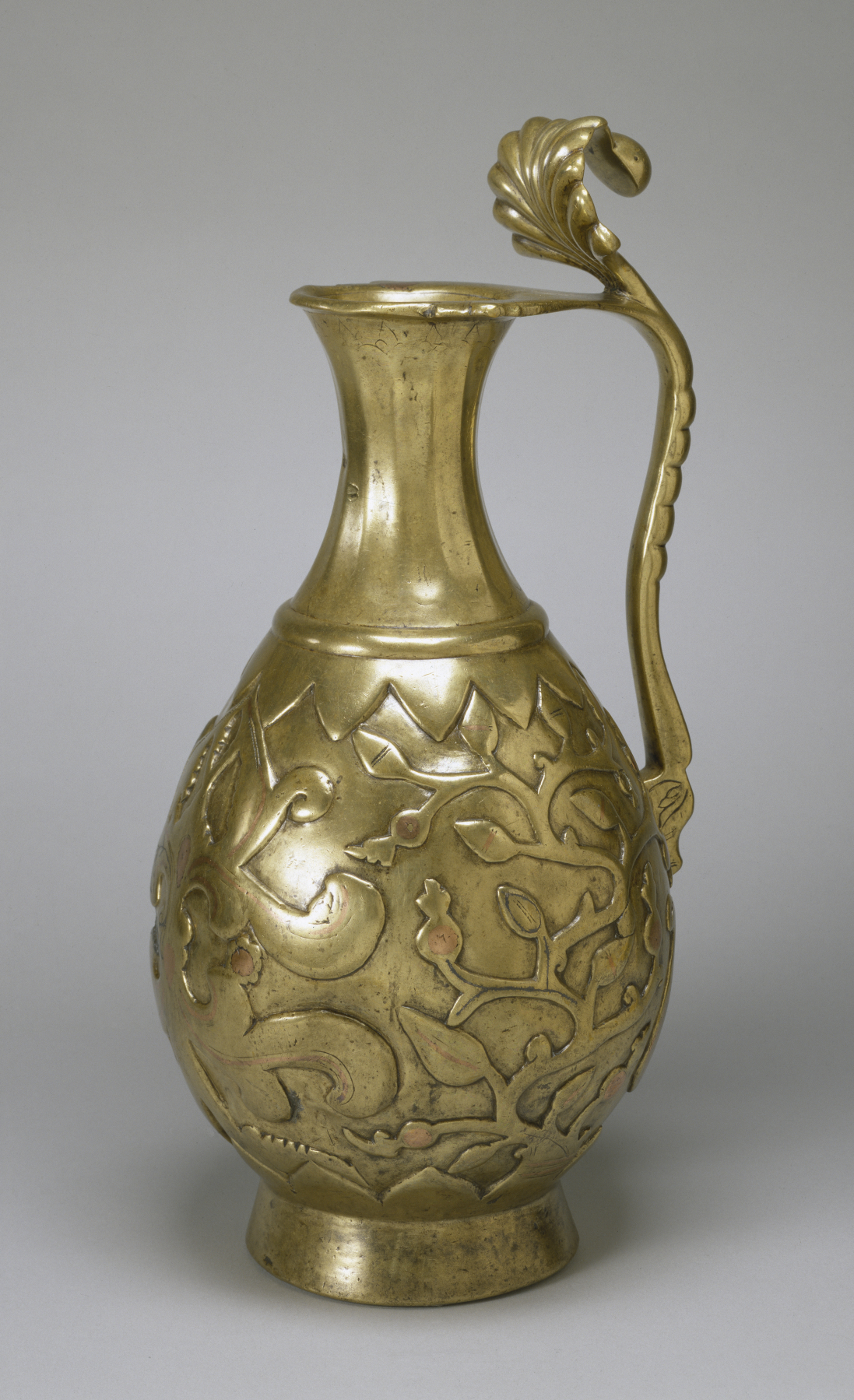
7th-century Persian ewer in brass with copper inlay, Walters Art Museum, Baltimore, Maryland, US

During the later part of first millennium BC the use of brass spread across a wide geographical area from Britain and Spain in the west to Iran, and India in the east. This seems to have been encouraged by exports and influence from the Middle East and eastern Mediterranean where deliberate production of brass from metallic copper and zinc ores had been introduced. The 4th century BC writer Theopompus, quoted by Strabo, describes how heating earth from Andeira in Turkey produced "droplets of false silver", probably metallic zinc, which could be used to turn copper into oreichalkos. In the 1st century BC the Greek Dioscorides seems to have recognized a link between zinc minerals and brass describing how Cadmia (zinc oxide) was found on the walls of furnaces used to heat either zinc ore or copper and explaining that it can then be used to make brass.

By the first century BC brass was available in sufficient supply to use as coinage in Phrygia and Bithynia, and after the Augustan currency reform of 23 BC it was also used to make Roman dupondii and sestertii. The uniform use of brass for coinage and military equipment across the Roman world may indicate a degree of state involvement in the industry, and brass even seems to have been deliberately boycotted by Jewish communities in Palestine because of its association with Roman authority.

Brass was produced by the cementation process where copper and zinc ore are heated together until zinc vapor is produced which reacts with the copper. There is good archaeological evidence for this process and crucibles used to produce brass by cementation have been found on Roman period sites including Xanten and Nidda in Germany, Lyon in France and at a number of sites in Britain. They vary in size from tiny acorn sized to large amphorae like vessels but all have elevated levels of zinc on the interior and are lidded. They show no signs of slag or metal prills suggesting that zinc minerals were heated to produce zinc vapor which reacted with metallic copper in a solid state reaction. The fabric of these crucibles is porous, probably designed to prevent a buildup of pressure, and many have small holes in the lids which may be designed to release pressure or to add additional zinc minerals near the end of the process. Dioscorides mentioned that zinc minerals were used for both the working and finishing of brass, perhaps suggesting secondary additions.

Brass made during the early Roman period seems to have varied between 20% and 28% wt zinc. The high content of zinc in coinage and brass objects declined after the first century AD and it has been suggested that this reflects zinc loss during recycling and thus an interruption in the production of new brass. However it is now thought this was probably a deliberate change in composition and overall the use of brass increases over this period making up around 40% of all copper alloys used in the Roman world by the 4th century AD.

=== Medieval period ===
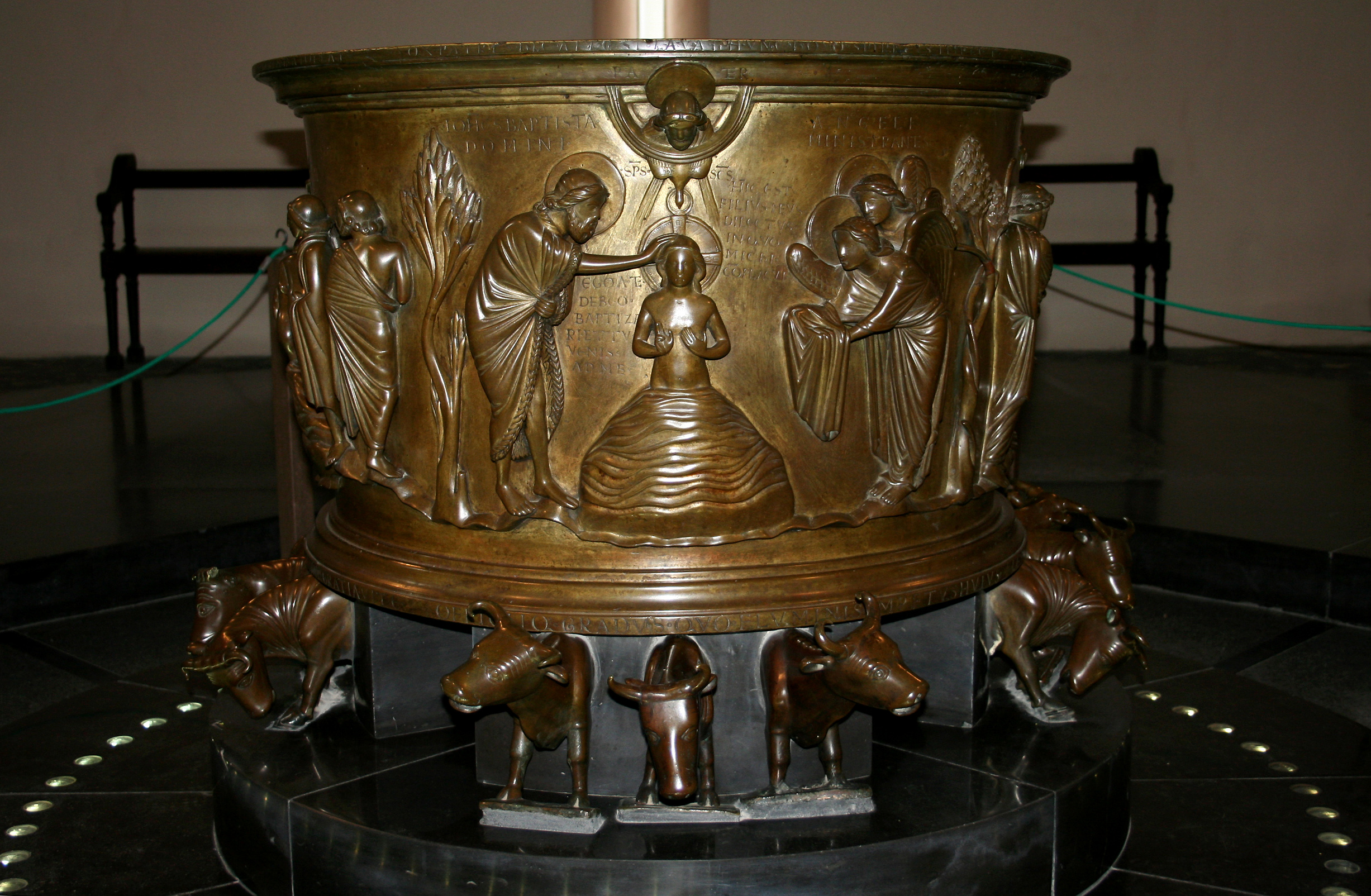
Baptism of Christ on the 12th-century baptismal font at St Bartholomew's Church, Liège

Little is known about the production of brass during the centuries immediately after the collapse of the Roman Empire. Disruption in the trade of tin for bronze from Western Europe may have contributed to the increasing popularity of brass in the east and by the 6th–7th centuries AD over 90% of copper alloy artefacts from Egypt were made of brass. However other alloys such as low tin bronze were also used and they vary depending on local cultural attitudes, the purpose of the metal and access to zinc, especially between the Islamic and Byzantine world. Conversely the use of true brass seems to have declined in Western Europe during this period in favor of gunmetals and other mixed alloys but by about 1000 brass artefacts are found in Scandinavian graves in Scotland, brass was being used in the manufacture of coins in Northumbria and there is archaeological and historical evidence for the production of calamine brass in Germany and the Low Countries, areas rich in calamine ore.

These places would remain important centres of brass making throughout the Middle Ages period, especially Dinant. Brass objects are still collectively known as dinanderie in French. The baptismal font at St Bartholomew's Church, Liège in modern Belgium (before 1117) is an outstanding masterpiece of Romanesque brass casting, though also often described as bronze. The metal of the early 12th-century Gloucester Candlestick is unusual even by medieval standards in being a mixture of copper, zinc, tin, lead, nickel, iron, antimony and arsenic with an unusually large amount of silver, ranging from 22.5% in the base to 5.76% in the pan below the candle. The proportions of this mixture may suggest that the candlestick was made from a hoard of old coins, probably Late Roman. Latten is a term for medieval alloys of uncertain and often variable composition often covering decorative borders and similar objects cut from sheet metal, whether of brass or bronze. Especially in Tibetan art, analysis of some objects shows very different compositions from different ends of a large piece. Aquamaniles were typically made in brass in both the European and Islamic worlds.

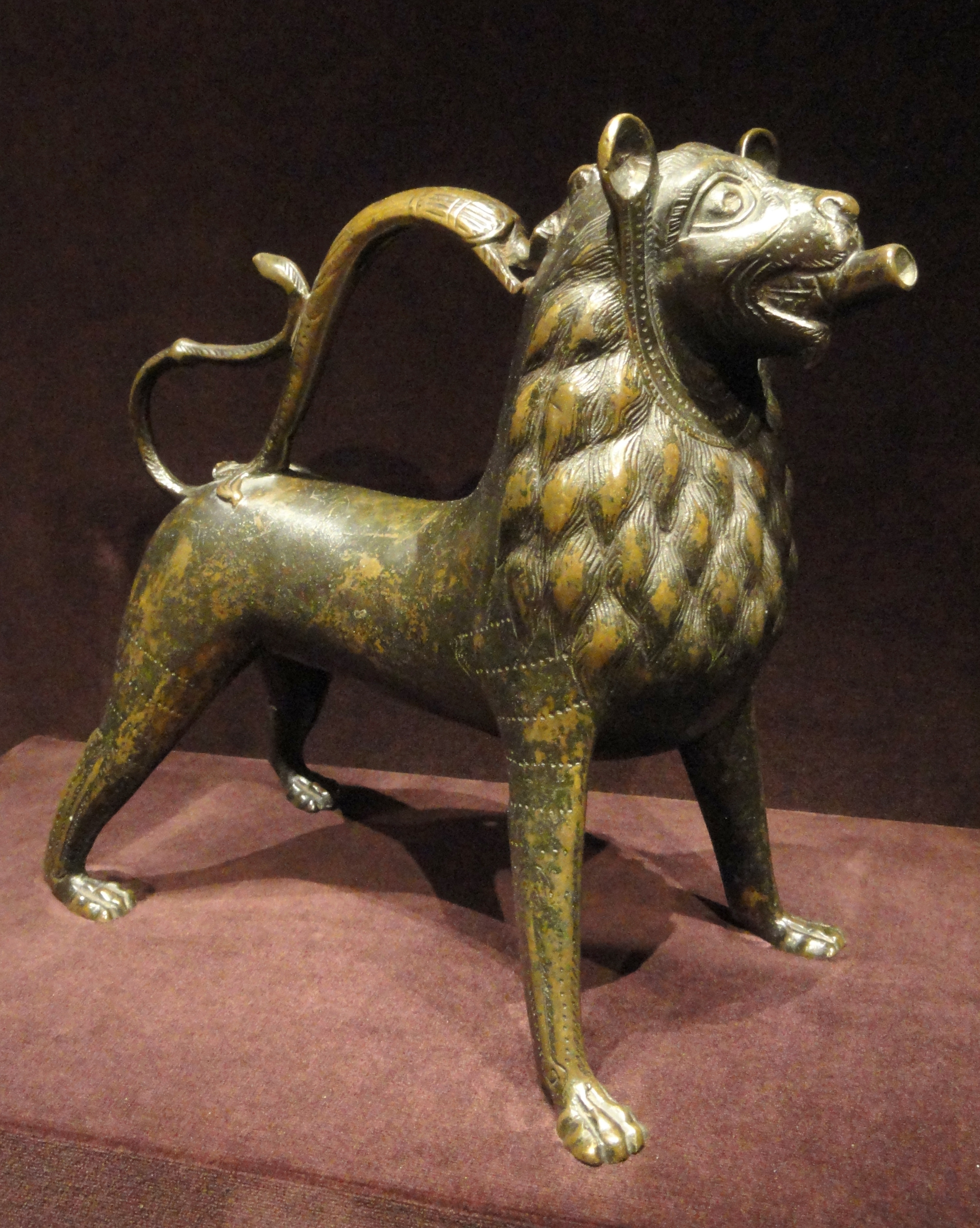
Brass aquamanile from Lower Saxony, Germany, c. 1250

The cementation process continued to be used but literary sources from both Europe and the Islamic world seem to describe variants of a higher temperature liquid process which took place in open-topped crucibles. Islamic cementation seems to have used zinc oxide known as tutiya or tutty rather than zinc ores for brass-making, resulting in a metal with lower iron impurities. A number of Islamic writers and the 13th century Italian Marco Polo describe how this was obtained by sublimation from zinc ores and condensed onto clay or iron bars, archaeological examples of which have been identified at Kush in Iran. It could then be used for brass making or medicinal purposes. In 10th century Yemen al-Hamdani described how spreading al-iglimiya, probably zinc oxide, onto the surface of molten copper produced tutiya vapor which then reacted with the metal. The 13th century Iranian writer al-Kashani describes a more complex process whereby tutiya was mixed with raisins and gently roasted before being added to the surface of the molten metal. A temporary lid was added at this point presumably to minimize the escape of zinc vapor.

In Europe a similar liquid process in open-topped crucibles took place which was probably less efficient than the Roman process and the use of the term tutty by Albertus Magnus in the 13th century suggests influence from Islamic technology. The 12th century German monk Theophilus described how preheated crucibles were one sixth filled with powdered calamine and charcoal then topped up with copper and charcoal before being melted, stirred then filled again. The final product was cast, then again melted with calamine. It has been suggested that this second melting may have taken place at a lower temperature to allow more zinc to be absorbed. Albertus Magnus noted that the "power" of both calamine and tutty could evaporate and described how the addition of powdered glass could create a film to bind it to the metal. German brass making crucibles are known from Dortmund dating to the 10th century AD and from Soest and Schwerte in Westphalia dating to around the 13th century confirm Theophilus' account, as they are open-topped, although ceramic discs from Soest may have served as loose lids which may have been used to reduce zinc evaporation, and have slag on the interior resulting from a liquid process.

=== Africa ===
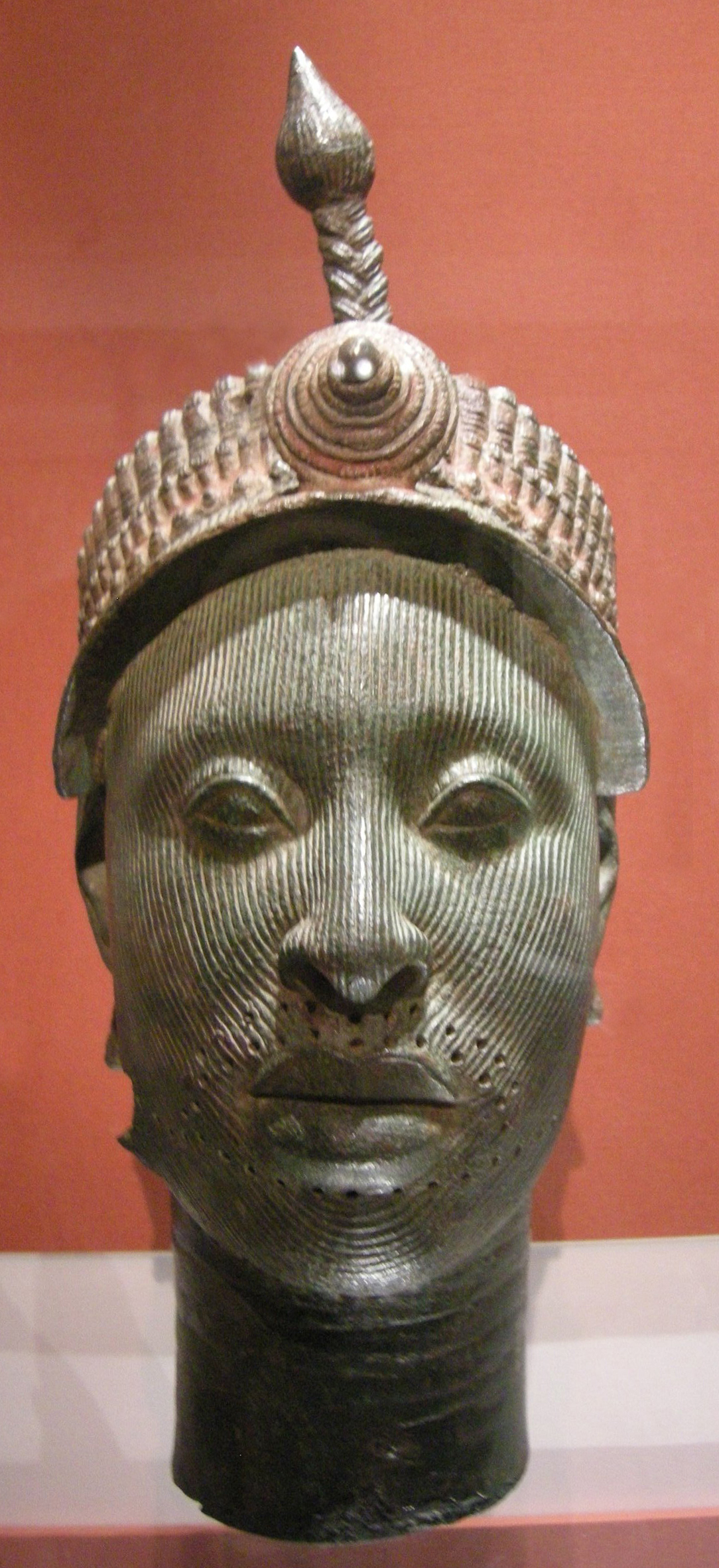
12th century "Bronze Head from Ife", actually of "heavily leaded zinc-brass"

Some of the most famous objects in African art are the lost wax castings of West Africa, mostly from what is now Nigeria, produced first by the Kingdom of Ife and then the Benin Empire. Though normally described as "bronzes", the Benin Bronzes, now mostly in the British Museum and other Western collections, and the large portrait heads such as the Bronze Head from Ife of "heavily leaded zinc-brass" and the Bronze Head of Queen Idia, both also British Museum, are better described as brass, though of variable compositions. Work in brass or bronze continued to be important in Benin art and other West African traditions such as Akan goldweights, where the metal was regarded as a more valuable material than in Europe. Brass Manilla (money) bracelets were also used as a means of exchange, across West Africa, into the 20th century.

=== Renaissance and post-medieval Europe ===
The Renaissance saw important changes to both the theory and practice of brassmaking in Europe. By the 15th century there is evidence for the renewed use of lidded cementation crucibles at Zwickau in Germany. These large crucibles were capable of producing c.20 kg of brass. There are traces of slag and pieces of metal on the interior. Their irregular composition suggests that this was a lower temperature, not entirely liquid, process. The crucible lids had small holes which were blocked with clay plugs near the end of the process presumably to maximize zinc absorption in the final stages. Triangular crucibles were then used to melt the brass for casting.

16th-century technical writers such as Biringuccio, Ercker and Agricola described a variety of cementation brass making techniques and came closer to understanding the true nature of the process noting that copper became heavier as it changed to brass and that it became more golden as additional calamine was added. Zinc metal was also becoming more commonplace. By 1513 metallic zinc ingots from India and China were arriving in London and pellets of zinc condensed in furnace flues at the Rammelsberg in Germany were exploited for cementation brass making from around 1550.

Eventually it was discovered that metallic zinc could be alloyed with copper to make brass, a process known as speltering, and by 1657 the German chemist Johann Glauber had recognized that calamine was "nothing else but unmeltable zinc" and that zinc was a "half ripe metal". However some earlier high zinc, low iron brasses such as the 1530 Wightman brass memorial plaque from England may have been made by alloying copper with zinc and include traces of cadmium similar to those found in some zinc ingots from China.

However, the cementation process was not abandoned, and as late as the early 19th century there are descriptions of solid-state cementation in a domed furnace at around 900–950 °C and lasting up to 10 hours. The European brass industry continued to flourish into the post medieval period buoyed by innovations such as the 16th century introduction of water powered hammers for the production of wares such as pots. By 1559 the Germany city of Aachen alone was capable of producing 300,000 cwt of brass per year. After several false starts during the 16th and 17th centuries the brass industry was also established in England taking advantage of abundant supplies of cheap copper smelted in the new coal fired reverberatory furnace. In 1723 Bristol brass maker Nehemiah Champion patented the use of granulated copper, produced by pouring molten metal into cold water. This increased the surface area of the copper helping it react and zinc contents of up to 33% wt were reported using this new technique.

In 1738 Nehemiah's son William Champion patented a technique for the first industrial scale distillation of metallic zinc known as distillation per descencum or "the English process". This local zinc was used in speltering and allowed greater control over the zinc content of brass and the production of high-zinc copper alloys which would have been difficult or impossible to produce using cementation, for use in expensive objects such as scientific instruments, clocks, brass buttons and costume jewelry. However Champion continued to use the cheaper calamine cementation method to produce lower-zinc brass and the archaeological remains of bee-hive shaped cementation furnaces have been identified at his works at Warmley.

By the mid-to-late 18th century developments in cheaper zinc distillation such as John-Jaques Dony's horizontal furnaces in Belgium and the reduction of tariffs on zinc as well as demand for corrosion-resistant high zinc alloys increased the popularity of speltering and as a result cementation was largely abandoned by the mid-19th century.

The hilt of Sirohi swords (16-19th century CE) were made up of brass in India.

== See also ==
- Brass bed, a bed frame with brass head and foot
- Brass rubbing
- List of copper alloys

== General references ==
- Bayley, J. (1990). "The Production of Brass in Antiquity with Particular Reference to Roman Britain". In Craddock, P. T. (ed.). 2000 Years of Zinc and Brass. London: British Museum.
- Craddock, P. T. and Eckstein, K (2003). "Production of Brass in Antiquity by Direct Reduction". In Craddock, P. T. and Lang, J. (eds.). Mining and Metal Production Through the Ages. London: British Museum.
- Day, J. (1990). "Brass and Zinc in Europe from the Middle Ages until the 19th century". In Craddock, P. T. (ed.). 2000 Years of Zinc and Brass. London: British Museum.
- Day, J. (1991). "Copper, Zinc and Brass Production". In Day, J. and Tylecote, R. F. (eds.). The Industrial Revolution in Metals. London: The Institute of Metals.
- Martinon Torres, M.; Rehren, T. (2002). "Agricola and Zwickau: theory and practice of Renaissance brass production in SE Germany". Historical Metallurgy. 36 (2): 95–111.
- Rehren, T. and Martinon Torres, M. (2008) "Naturam ars imitate: European brassmaking between craft and science". In Martinon-Torres, M. and Rehren, T. (eds.). Archaeology, History and Science: Integrating Approaches to Ancient Material. Left Coast Press.
