= UBE Corporation =

Japanese chemicals company

UBE Corporation UBE株式会社
- Company type: Public (K.K)
- Traded as: TYO: 4208; FSE: 4208; Nikkei 225 Component
- Industry: Chemicals
- Founded: June 1897; 129 years ago
- Founder: Sukesaku Watanabe
- Headquarters: Seavans North Building, 1-2-1, Shibaura, Minato-ku, Tokyo 105-8449, Japan (Tokyo head office); 1978-96 Kogushi, Ube, Yamaguchi 755-8633, Japan (Ube head office)
- Area served: Worldwide
- Key people: Michio Takeshita (president and CEO)
- Products: Chemicals; Plastics; Pharmaceuticals; Cement; Building materials; Industrial machinery; Power generation; Defense technology
- Revenue: ▲$ 6.3 billion USD (FY 2013) (¥ 650.5 billion JPY) (FY 2013)
- Net income: ▲$ 122 million USD (FY 2013) (¥ 12.6 billion JPY) (FY 2013)
- Number of employees: 9,849 (consolidated as of March 31, 2022)
- Website: Official website

UBE Corporation (UBE株式会社, Yū-bī-ī Kabushiki-gaisha) is a Japanese chemical company manufacturing chemicals, plastics, battery materials, pharmaceuticals, cement, construction materials, and machinery.

The former company name is Ube Industries, Ltd. (宇部興産株式会社, Ube Kōsan Kabushiki-gaisha)

The company was founded in 1897 when Sukesaku Watanabe —an industrialist, a member of the House of Representatives of Japan and a deputy mayor of Ube— established Okinoyama Coal Mine, the predecessor of the present Ube industries.

Since then, the company has established six core business units: Chemicals & plastics, specialty chemicals & products, cement, pharmaceuticals, machinery and metal products, energy and environment.

The company is listed on the Tokyo Stock Exchange and Fukuoka Stock Exchange, and is a constituent of the Nikkei 225 stock index.

Ube Industries is a member of the Mitsubishi UFJ Financial Group (MUFJ) keiretsu.

== History ==
- 1897: Okinoyama Coal Mine (沖ノ山炭鉱組合, Okinoyama Tankō Kumiai) is established as a silent partnership
- 1914: Ube Shinkawa Iron Works (宇部新川鉄工所, Ube Shinkawa Tekkōjo) is established as a silent partnership.
- 1923: Ube Cement Production, Ltd. (宇部セメント製造, Ube Cement Seizō) is established.
- 1933: Ube Nitrogen Industry, Ltd. (宇部窒素工業, Ube Chisso Kōogyō) is established.
- 1942: Ube Industries, Ltd. is established through amalgamation of the four foregoing companies.
- 1993: Capital investment is made in PQM of Spain (now Ube Chemical Europe, S.A.)
- 1997: Thai Caprolactam Public Co., Ltd. and Ube Nylon (Thailand) Ltd. (now UBE Chemicals (Asia) Public Company Ltd.) open for business.
- 1998: Ube-Mitsubishi Cement Corporation (joint venture with Mitsubishi Materials Corporation) is established.

== Main products ==
=== Chemicals and plastics ===
- Caprolactam
- Polyamide
- Synthetic rubber
- Ammonia
- Acrylonitrile butadiene styrene
- Polyethylene

=== Speciality chemicals and products ===
- Liquid electrolyte
- Diol
- dimethyl carbonate
- Polyimide
- High Purity Silicon Nitride Powder
- N2 Separation Membranes

=== Pharmaceutical ===
- Pharmaceutical materials
- Pharmaceutical licenses

=== Cement and construction materials ===
- Cement
- Concrete
- Limestone
- Magnesia

=== Energy and environment ===
- Coal

=== Machinery and metal products ===
- Aluminum wheels
- Bridges
- Injection molding machines
- Die casting machines

=== Defense technology ===
Ube provides advanced materials for various defense and aerospace applications, for example it's Tyranno fiber (a material incorporating a silicon/titanium mix) is used as a stealth material in the X-2 experimental aircraft.

== Corporate governance ==
=== Board directors ===
- Chairperson and Director
  - Hiroaki Tamura
- President and Representative Director
  - Michio Takeshita (CEO, also holds the post of vice chairperson of the Japan Chemical Industry Association)
- Representative Director
  - Kazuhiko Okada
- Directors
  - Akinori Furukawa (CCO, General Director of General affairs and Personnel Office)
  - Makoto Umetsu (General Director of Research and Development)
  - Yoshiomi Matsumoto (He was vice president of the Industrial Bank of Japan)
  - Mitsutaka Motoda (He is President of the Sanwa Research Institute and used to be Senior managing director of Sanwa bank)

== Locations (UBE Group) ==
=== Japan ===
- Tokyo (Headquarters)
- Ube (Headquarters, R&D, Plant, Bulk terminal, Limestone mine)
- Fukuoka (Sales branch, Plant)
- Chiba (R&D, Plant)
- Osaka (Plants, Sales branch)
- Nagoya (Sales branch)

The presidents of the Ube Chamber of Commerce and Industry are elected from retired persons of The company. Serving president Yasuhisa Chiba (he was Representative Director of Ube industries) also holds the post of vice chairperson of the Chemical Society of Japan. Some employees of the Ube Group are elected to assemblyman.

=== Worldwide ===
- Thailand (Sales branch, R&D, Plant)
- Spain (Sales branch, R&D, Plant)
- Nantong, China (Plant)
- U.S. (Sales branch, Plant)
- Seoul, South Korea (Sales branch)
- Shanghai, China (Sales branch)
- Hongkong, China (Sales branch)
- Singapore (Sales branch)
- Düsseldorf, Germany (Sales branch)
- São Paulo, Brazil (Sales branch)
- Taiwan (Sales branch)
- Mexico City (Sales branch)

etc.

UBE Group is doing business worldwide, especially Thailand (Rayong Province) and Spain (Province of Castellón) are main sites for petrochemical business. UBE Chemicals (Asia) Public Company Ltd. (UCHA) is one of the cogent chemical companies in Thailand. The company is the sole caprolactam producer in Thailand. Dr. Charunya Phichitkul, the president of UCHA also holds the post of vice chairperson of the petrochemical Industry Club The Federation of Thai Industries.

== See also ==
- Ceramic matrix composite

== Gallery ==
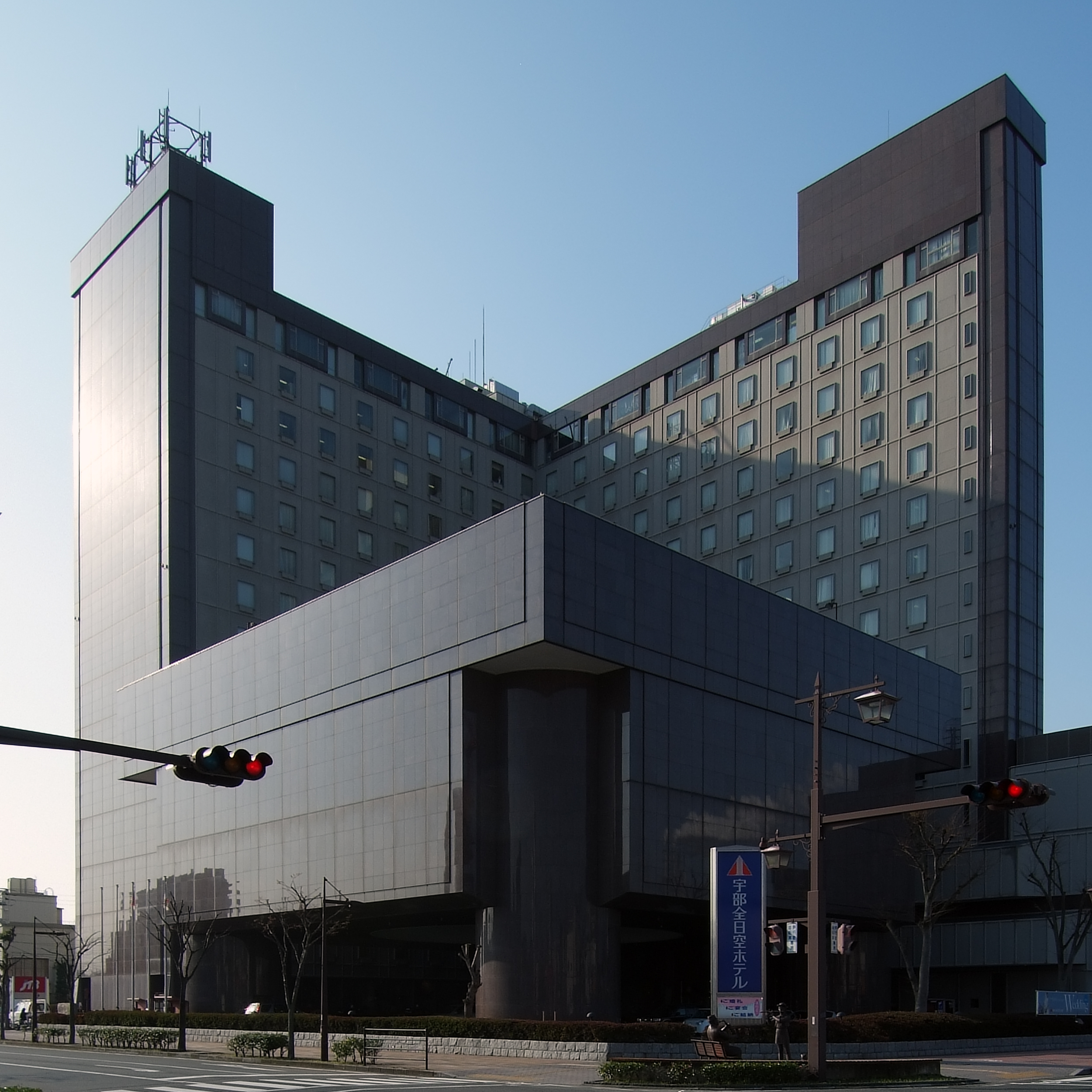
Ube Kosan Building in Ube City

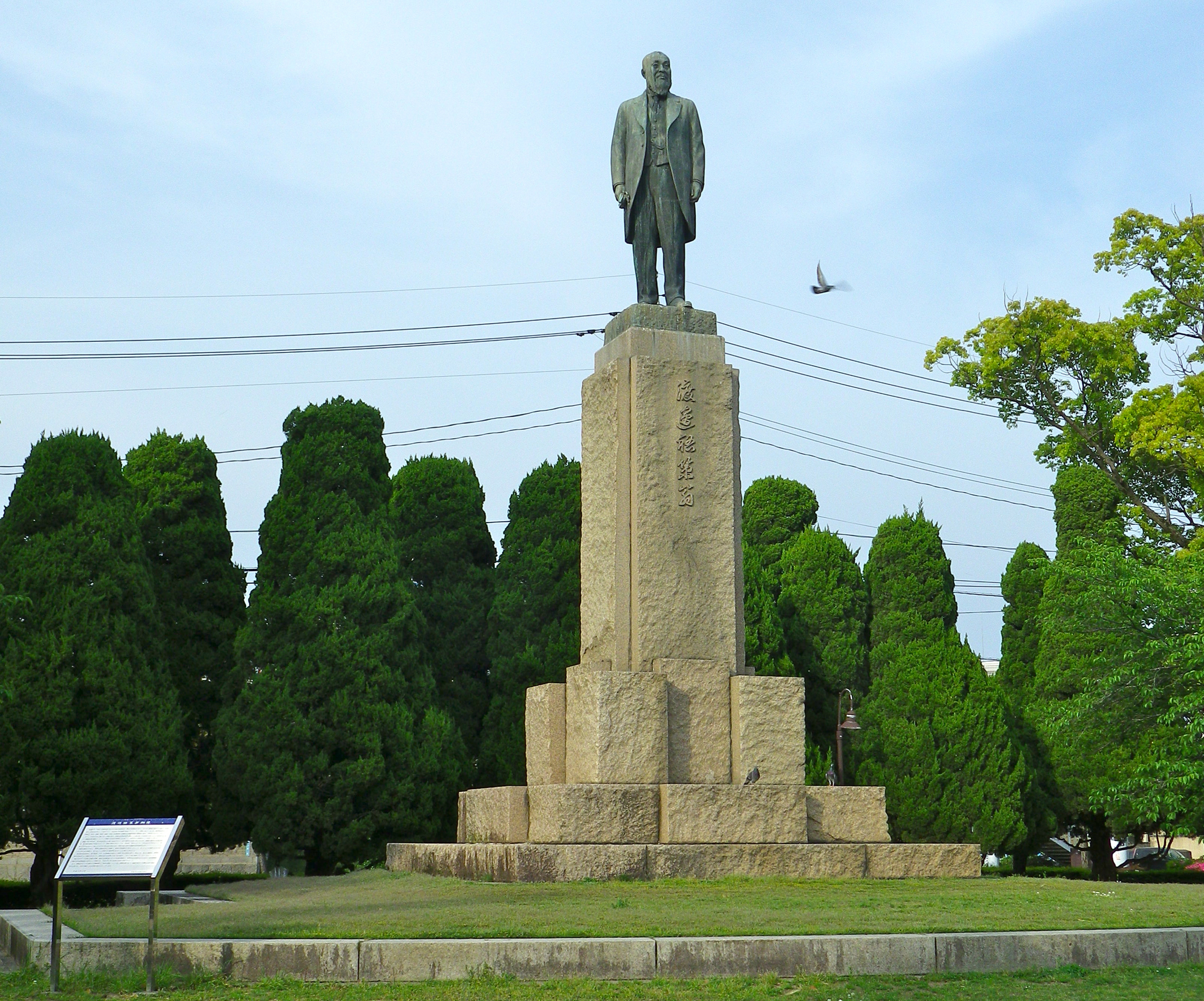
Statue of company founder Sukesaku Watanabe

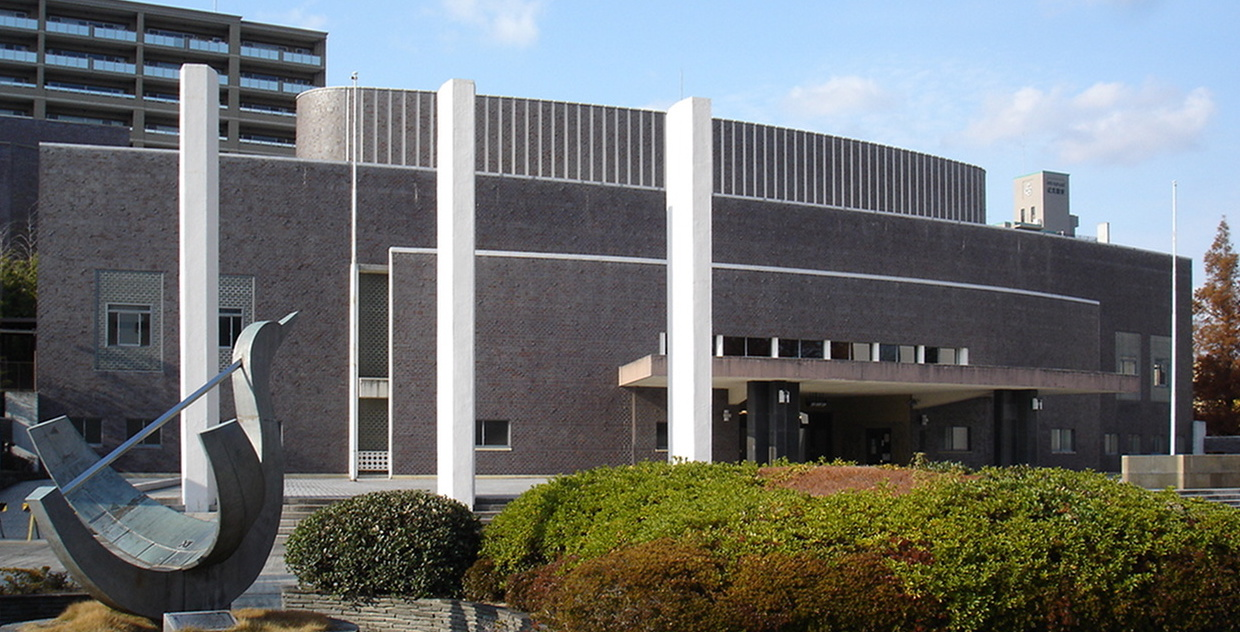
Watanabe Memorial Hall

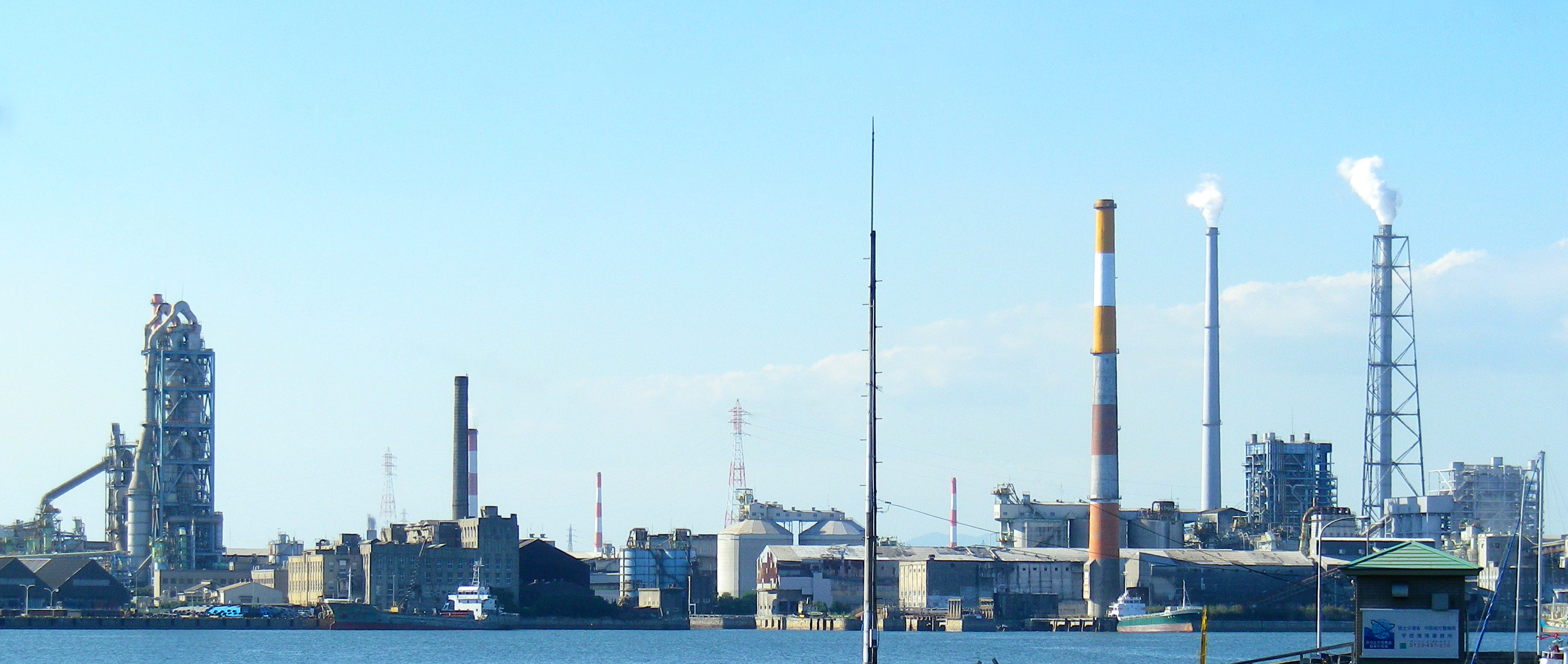
Ube's chemical plant in Ube, Yamaguchi

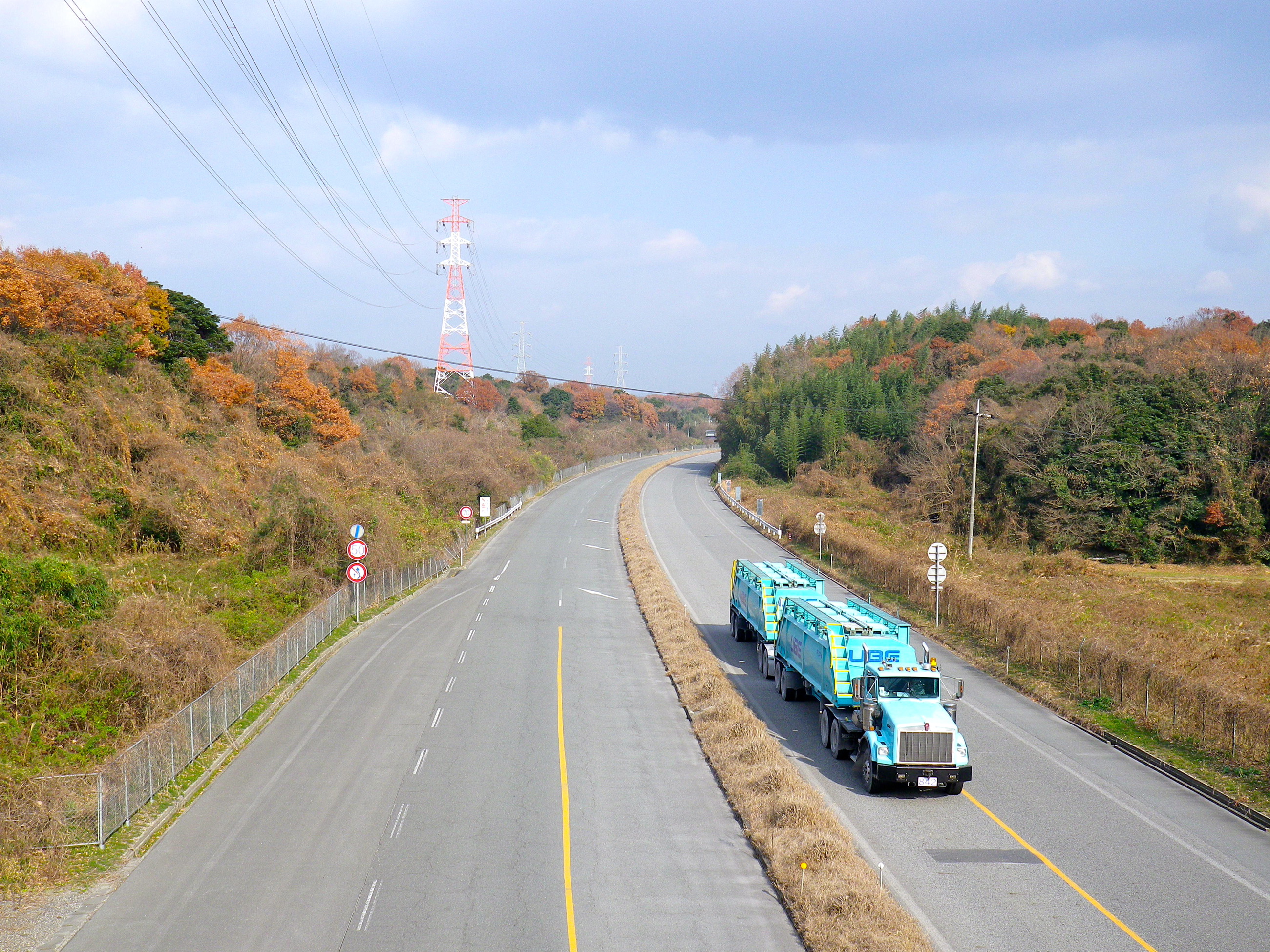
Ube mine expressway, a Ube dedicated road in Yamaguchi prefecture
