= Centrifugal casting =

Centrifugal casting is a manufacturing process that may refer to:

- Centrifugal casting (industrial), on an industrial scale
- Centrifugal casting (silversmithing), for a smaller scale
- Spin casting, or centrifugal rubber mold casting
