= MMT Observatory =

Part of the Fred Lawrence Whipple Observatory

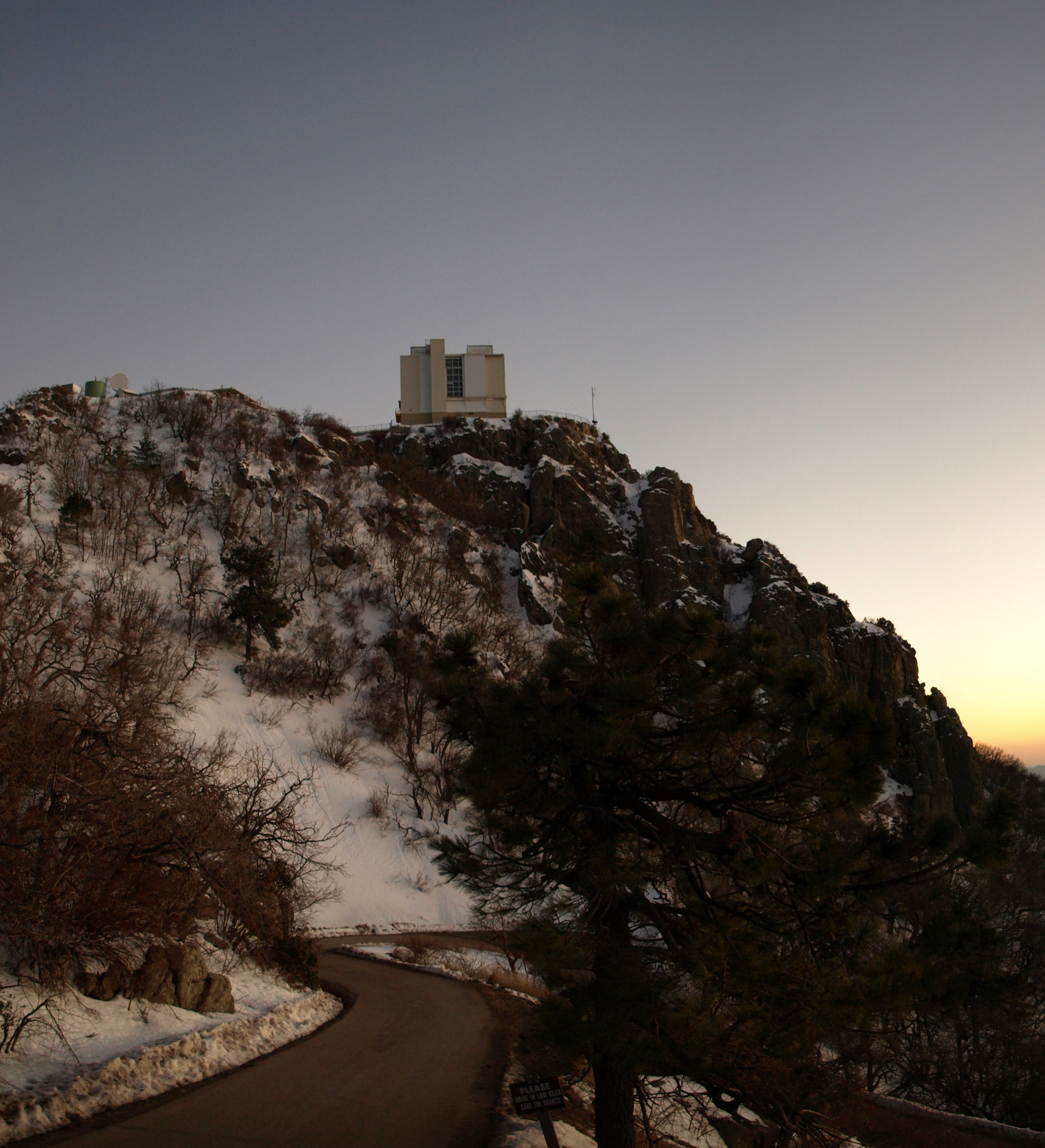
- MMT Observatory
- Alternative names: MMTO
- Location(s): Arizona
- Coordinates: 31°41′18″N 110°53′06″W
- Altitude: 2,616 m (8,583 ft)
- Diameter: 6.5 m (21 ft 4 in)
- Website: www.mmto.org
- Location of MMT Observatory
- Related media on Commons

The MMT Observatory (MMTO) is an astronomical observatory on the site of Fred Lawrence Whipple Observatory (IAU observatory code 696). The Whipple observatory complex is located on Mount Hopkins, Arizona, US (55 km south of Tucson) in the Santa Rita Mountains. The observatory is operated by the University of Arizona and the Smithsonian Institution, and has a visitor center in nearby Amado, Arizona. The MMTO is the home of the MMT (formerly Multiple Mirror Telescope), which has a primary mirror 6.5 m in diameter. The name comes from the six smaller mirrors originally used before the single primary mirror was installed in 1998. The primary mirror has a special lightweight honeycomb design made by the University of Arizona's Steward Observatory Mirror Laboratory. The MMT is housed in a building which allows the walls and roof around the telescope to be completely rolled back, allowing it to cool down very quickly in order to improve observation.

== Multiple Mirror Telescope (1979–1998) ==
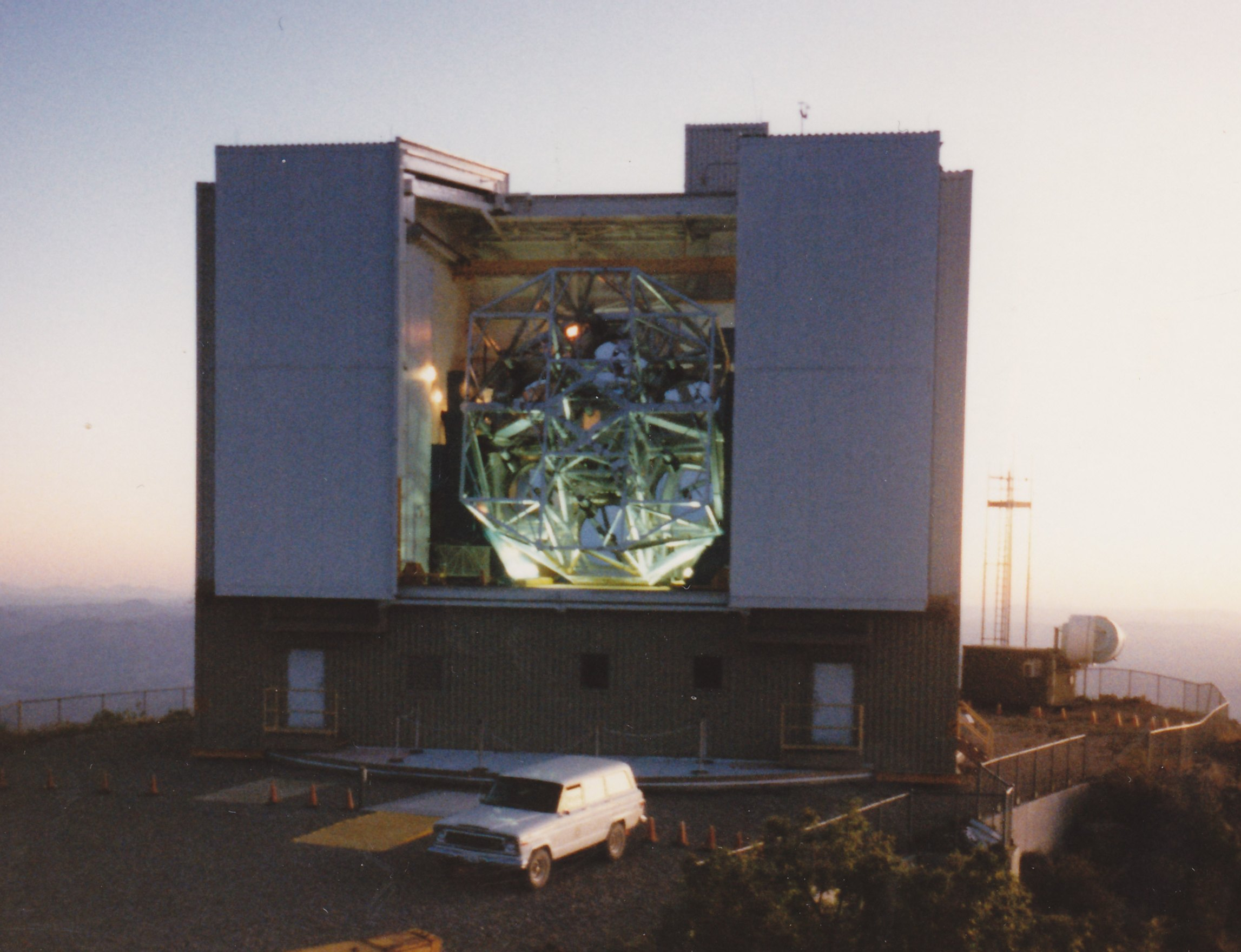
The MMT in 1981, showing its six primary mirrors

The Multiple Mirror Telescope operated between 1979 and 1998 with six honeycombed borosilicate mirrors by Corning, each with a diameter of 72 inches (1.8 m), which were donated by the NRO after cancellation of the reconnaissance mission KH-10 (codename DORIAN) based on the Manned Orbiting Laboratory. These mirrors were providing the equivalent gathering area of a 4.5-meter telescope, making it the third largest optical telescope in the world at the time of its dedication. It featured ambitious design innovations including its unusual optical design proposed by Aden Meinel, a co-rotating building and an altitude-azimuth mount.

With the exception of the Large Altazimuth Telescope and William Herschel's 40-foot telescope, major optical telescopes prior to the MMT used equatorial mounts. The MMT heralded a change in telescope design; all major optical telescopes since the MMT have been built with altitude-azimuth mounts. Several technologies pioneered at the MMT contributed to the success of the subsequent generation of large telescopes. These included: high dynamic-range servos for the altitude-azimuth mount; highly accurate pointing that eliminated the need for sky charts; co-alignment and co-phasing of multiple telescopes; improvements to optical performance by attention to the thermal environment of the facility; contributions to vacuum coatings deposition, optics cleaning, and maintenance; and early experiments in co-phased adaptive optics.

== MMT (since 1998) ==
One of the reasons for its original multiple mirror design was the difficulty of casting large mirrors. One solution to this problem was found by Roger Angel of Steward Observatory, of the University of Arizona, which casts mirrors having a honeycomb structure, in the interior of a rotating oven. This made it possible to replace the six mirrors with a single 6.5-meter mirror. The original building and part of the structure were reused. The new mirror was the first of its size to be cast and polished in the Steward Observatory Mirror Laboratory. The updated MMT, its name no longer an acronym, was rededicated on 20 May 2000.

In late 2002, a novel deformable secondary mirror was added to the telescope. While other adaptive optics designs do their corrections with additional mirrors, minimizing the number of warm surfaces in the light path produces better results in infrared wavelengths. The MMT AO system contributed to the design of the Large Binocular Telescope, which achieved record breaking Strehl ratios with its AO system in 2010.

From 2004 to 2010, approximately 8% of MMT observing time was made accessible to the entire astronomical community via the US National Science Foundation's Telescope System Instrumentation Program (TSIP), administered by the National Optical Astronomy Observatory (NOAO).

== See also ==
- Massive Monolithic Telescope A telescope made from a single piece of glass
- List of astronomical observatories
- List of largest optical reflecting telescopes
- List of largest optical telescopes in the continental United States
