= Centrifugal casting (silversmithing) =

Casting technique where a small mould is poured, then spun on the end of an arm

In silversmithing, centrifugal casting is a casting technique where a small mould is poured, then spun on the end of an arm. The centrifugal force thus generated encourages a successful pour.

== Processes ==
Centrifugal casting, or centrifuging, is used as a means of casting small, detailed parts or jewelry. An articulated arm is free to spin around a vertical axle, which is driven by an electric motor or a spring. The entire mechanism is enclosed in a tub or drum to contain hot metal should the mold break or an excess of metal be used. Single use molds are prepared using the lost wax method. A small amount of metal in a crucible next to the mold is heated with a torch. When the metal is molten the arm is released, forcing (by centrifugal force) the metal into the mold. The high forces imposed on the metal overcome the viscosity, resulting in a finely detailed workpiece. A similar advantage may be obtained by vacuum casting or pressure casting.

For casting of small parts using hot metal, a disk shaped mold is contained within a rotating drum, and molten metal is poured into the center.

== Machinery ==
Many machines are available which can perform centrifugal casting, and they are relatively simple to construct. All that is required is an arm which rotates with an adequate amount of centrifugal force, a container on the end of said arm to hold both a mold and the material to be cast into the mold.

== See also ==
- Centrifugal casting (industrial) – Casting technique that is typically used to cast thin-walled cylinders
- Spin casting – Method of utilizing centrifugal force to produce castings from a rubber mold
- Spin casting (mirrors) – Technique for constructing large parabolic mirrors
