= Stone mould =

Within the history of metalworking, medieval stone moulds are well represented in the Herbert Art Gallery & Museum in Coventry with over 169 examples. The moulds from Coventry are from a highly calcareous mudstone of Jurassic type.

Such stone comes from Southam, Long Itchington and Harbury, all less than 15 miles from Coventry. There must have been a well organised trade in raw material, production and export sales of the finished product but despite this no documentary evidence has been preserved of the industry. The trade must be between user and supplier directly. Excavations at Bayley Lane in 1988 produced 69 stone moulds so Coventry must have been one of the production centres.

Some moulds were used as a one use mould for objects made from precious metals for an elite clientele, but most were for more mundane objects such as belt buckles and were used until they were broken or cracked. Moulds changed along with fashion which allows them to be dated quite accurately.

== See also ==
- Casting (metalworking)
