= Spin casting (mirrors) =

Technique for constructing large parabolic mirrors

Spin casting is a technique for constructing large parabolic mirrors by using the curved surface formed by a rotating liquid (e.g. in a rotating furnace). It is distinct from the spin casting or centrifugal rubber mold casting (CRMC) technique used for casting metal or plastics.

Pioneered by Roger Angel at the Steward Observatory's mirror lab, this makes large (8.4 metres or 28 feet) thin parabolic mirrors by spinning the oven as the glass is melted and cooled.

The term is applied to the fabrication of large telescope mirrors, where the natural paraboloid curve followed by the molten glass greatly reduces the amount of grinding required. Rather than being cast by pouring glass into a mold (with top and bottom), an entire turntable containing the peripheral mold, and the back pattern (a honeycomb pattern to lighten the finished product) is contained within a furnace and charged with the glass material used. The assembly (or rotating furnace) is then heated while spun at slow speed until the glass is liquid, then gradually cooled over a period of months.

== See also ==
- Rotating furnace – Device for making axially symmetric paraboloids technique
- Liquid-mirror telescope – Telescope whose mirror is a reflective liquid

== Bibliography ==
- Goble, L. W., et al. "Spincasting of a 3.5-m diameter f/1.75 mirror blank in borosilicate glass." Advances in Fabrication and Metrology for Optics and Large Optics. Vol. 966. International Society for Optics and Photonics, 1989.
- Hill, J. M., and J. R. P. Angel. "The Casting of the 6.5 m Borosilicate Mirror for the MMT Conversion." European Southern Observatory Conference and Workshop Proceedings. Vol. 42. 1992.
