= Spin casting =

Method of utilizing centrifugal force to produce castings from a rubber mold

Spin casting, also known as centrifugal rubber mold casting (CRMC), is a method of utilizing inertia to produce castings from a rubber mold. Typically, a disc-shaped mold is spun along its central axis at a set speed. The casting material, usually molten metal or liquid thermoset plastic, is then poured in through an opening at the top-center of the mold. The filled mold then continues to spin as the metal (or thermoset plastic) solidifies.

== General description ==
The two defining characteristics of spin casting are semi-permanent (non-expendable) rubber molds, and the use of inertial force. These make the process relatively unique compared to machined die-based and expendable mold casting methods. These qualities enable operators to design original models using media such as polymer clay, which has an easy to carve, Plasticine-like consistency and when heated using a conventional oven hardens enough to hold up under the vulcanization process, producing an original mold where models are then cast for the production mold. These qualities also encourage operators to use casting materials specially formulated for low melting points and viscosities. Most spin casting is done with pewter and zinc alloys or thermoset plastics.

== Silicone molds ==
The spin casting process typically uses vulcanized silicone or organic rubber as the mold-making substrate. Vulcanization is an integral step that occurs halfway through the mold-making process. Prior to vulcanization, the mold rubber is a soft and malleable solid-like fluid, in many ways very similar to Silly Putty. Because of the clay-like nature at this stage, the mold is easily cut or shaped to accommodate irregular models. Vulcanization serves two purposes: establishing the negative space inside the mold as well as hardening the rubber so it will remain strong and rigid during casting.

After vulcanization, before it is usable, the mold must undergo gating and venting. This involves carving channels to ensure proper air and material flow during the casting process. Gating and venting is typically done by hand using a sharp knife or scalpel and varies in time depending upon the complexity of the mold. The final product is a cured rubber mold, which can withstand anywhere from hundreds to over a thousand casting cycles before replacement is needed.

== Casting materials ==
=== Metal ===
Generally, the casting materials used for competing processes like metal die casting and injection molding are similar, but not suitable for spin casting. For example, a typical zinc die-casting alloy such as Zamak 3 can be used but will solidify too rapidly from a molten state when cast with centrifugal force. This typically results in incomplete filling of the mold as well as a rough, porous finish, called orange peel. Zamak 2, of a slightly different composition, was originally developed as a gravity-cast alloy with greater finished strength but was found to work well with spin-casting. Its extra copper content encourages the eutectic behaviour and gives a lower freezing point. It has become known as 'Kirksite' and has given rise to a range of dedicated spin-casting alloys, some with additional components, such as magnesium, to control the surface finish.

To ensure replicable casting cycles of accurate reproductions with a high quality finish, the spin casting process requires casting materials with the following qualities, for the following reasons:

- Low temperature operation - Spin casting is a low temperature process, as overexposure to high temperatures causes the rubber mold to degrade. Depending on the actual compound, the mold may become overly soft or hard while forming cracks and chips.
- Slow solidification and low viscosity - Uniform and unrestricted flow of the casting material has a substantial effect on the quality and finish of the final items.

=== Plastic ===
Aside from the aforementioned metal alloys, thermoset resins and plastics work well with spin casting as they can be introduced as liquids and will set or solidify while the mold spins. In general, spin casting encourages the use of casting materials that are liquid upon introduction to the mold and solidify at a slow, uniform rate during the spin cycle.

== Equipment ==
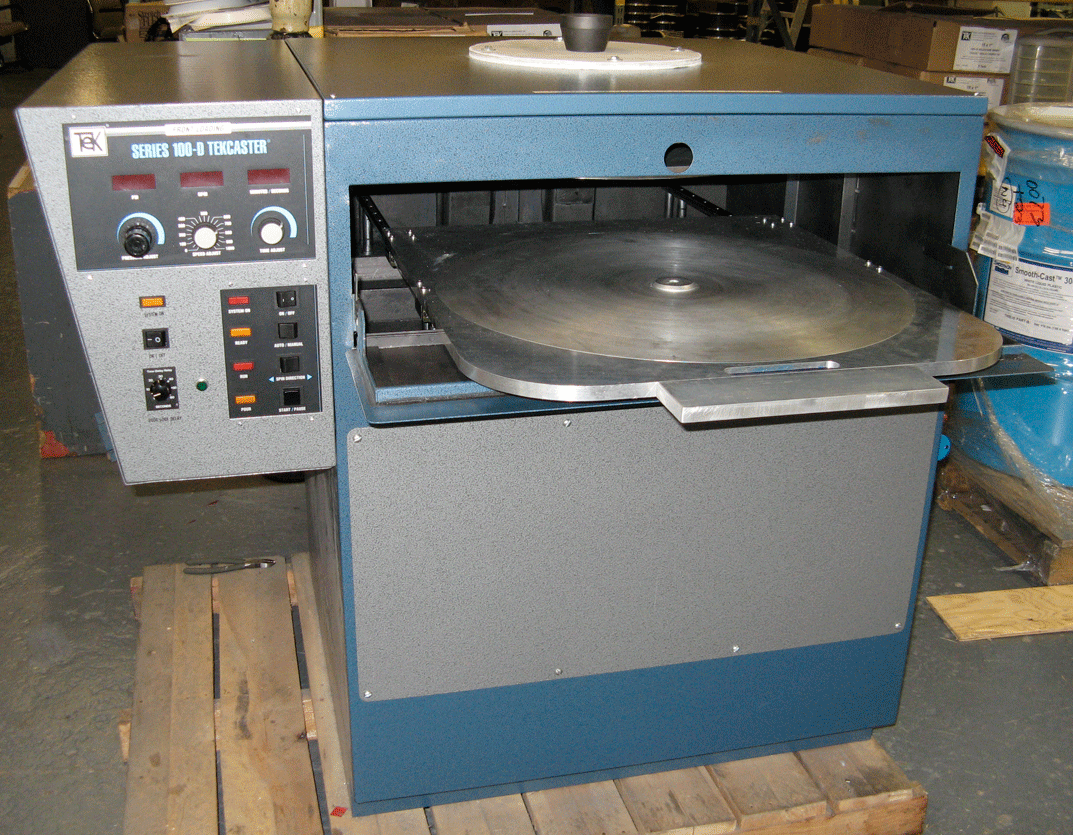
A 24" front-loading spin caster

=== Spin caster ===
During the casting process, the finished mold spins along its central axis for anywhere from 30 seconds to several minutes depending upon the chosen casting material. Internally, a spin casting machine or spin caster consists of a motor and pressure clamping system, which holds and positions the mold properly while it spins at a steady rate. These components are placed inside of a machine body, which shields against flashing of molten metal or liquid plastic that is inadvertently ejected from the mold during the spinning process. Without the proper containment, hot melted flashing can be a serious hazard to nearby persons.

Commercial spin casting machines are available in two different types, front-loading and top-loading. Owing to the weight and bulkiness of spin casting molds, front loading machines tend to offer several advantages regarding ease of use and time savings. Rubber molds can become quite heavy, especially at larger diameters and when casting metal. Because loading and unloading the caster is performed by hand, it is easiest and less fatiguing to manipulate the mold at waist level in one fluid motion as allowed by a front-loading spin caster. This is important in production spin casting, to maximize the number of casting cycles per hour.

Top loading machines tend to be cheaper and theoretically have less of a restriction on maximum mold thickness.

=== Vulcanizer ===
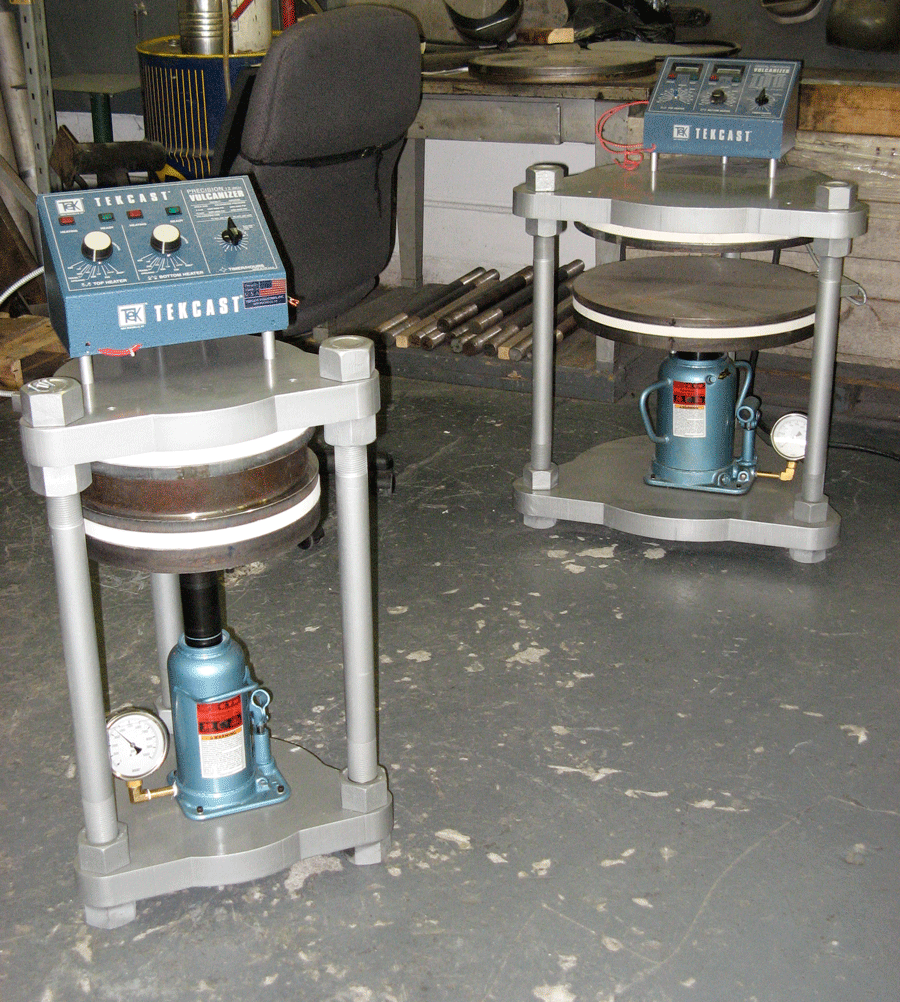
12" and 18" vulcanizing presses

Vulcanization is a necessary step to prepare the uncured silicone mold for spin casting. Under controlled heat and pressure the silicone slowly cures to a heat-resistant, flexible, permanent mold. The vulcanizing press or vulcanizer uniformly compresses the mold while exposing it to heat for several hours. The vulcanizer consists of a pair of parallel heated platens mounted on a hydraulic press. Smaller or home-made vulcanizers may compress the mold via screws or a heavy duty clamp instead of hydraulic pressure. Some spin casting operations choose to forgo running their own vulcanizer and procure molds from a supplier.

=== Melting furnace ===
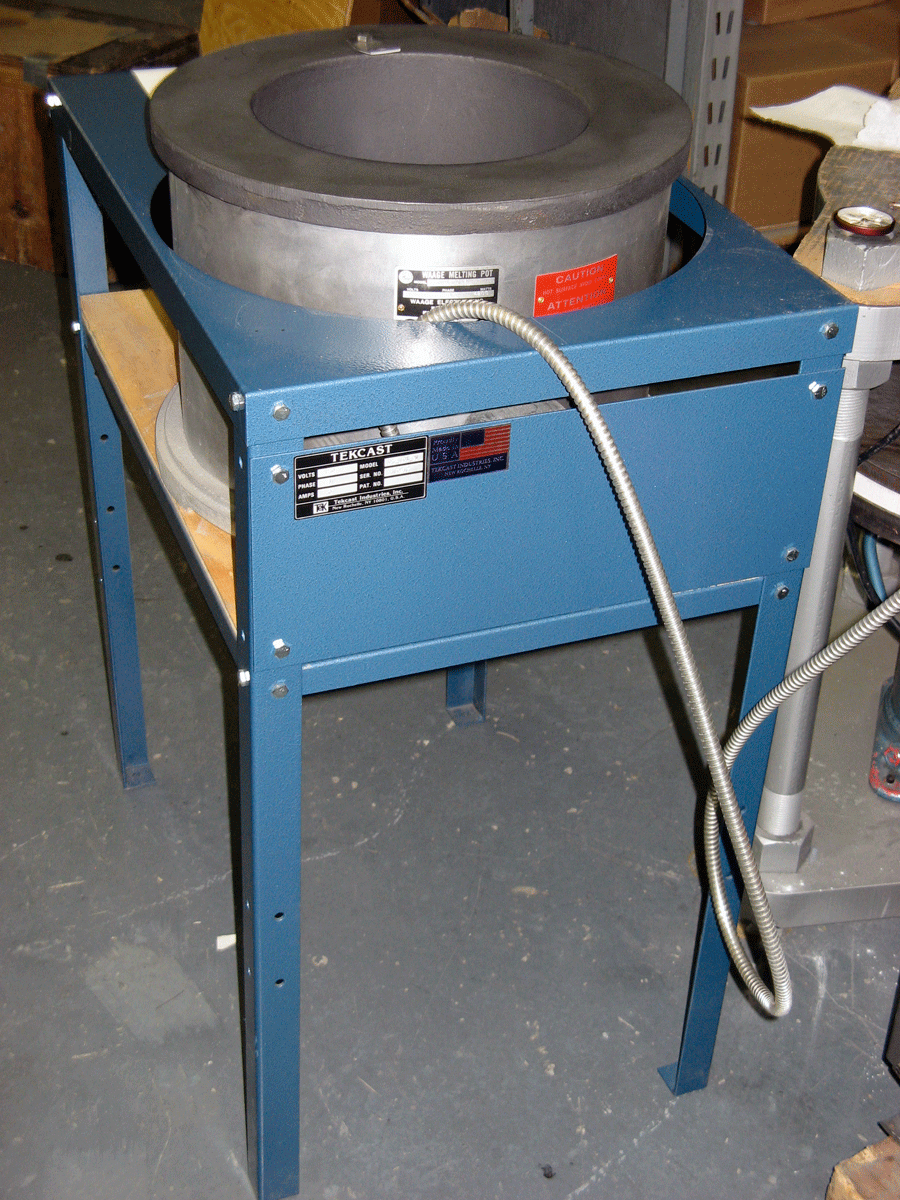
An electric melting furnace

A melting furnace is necessary only when spin casting metal. The metal must be molten prior to introduction into the mold. It is necessary for a spin casting furnace to have a temperature controller, as there is an optimal range for each metal. For example, a particular zinc alloy is typically cast between 413 and 427 °C (775 and 801 °F), whereas it actually melts much lower around 260 °C (500 °F). If the metal is introduced to the mold at a higher temperature (in this case, above 427 °C or 801 °F), it will wear the silicone prematurely, shortening the mold life. If the metal is introduced at significantly lower temperatures (below 413 °C or 775 °F), its solidification time will similarly be shortened resulting in incomplete or low quality castings. Spin casting metal requires a furnace with fine temperature control, and knowledge of proper casting temperature.

== Similar processes ==
Spin casting is a favored method for fabricating items in the specified materials – low temperature metals and thermoset plastics. Compared to the two main competing processes, injection molding and (zinc) die-casting, spin casting has significant advantages in terms of startup cost and ease of use. In some cases, spin casting can also be an alternative to sand casting, plaster mold casting or investment casting. These three techniques (sand, plaster and lost wax) are not directly comparable as each utilizes an expendable mold.

Comparison of spin casting to various other casting processes
	Spin casting	Die casting	Injection molding
Mold material	Vulcanized rubber	Machined tool steel	Machined aluminum, brass or tool steel
Casting material	Zinc, tin, lead, pewter, thermoset plastics, pattern wax	Zinc, aluminum, magnesium	Most thermoplastics
Average cost of tooling (USD)	$7,500–20,000	$50,000–2,500,000	$25,000–150,000
Ability to make design changes	Easiest	Very difficult	Very difficult
Typical initial lead time	4 hours to 2 days	12 to 24 weeks	12 to 24 weeks
Casting tolerances	Very close	Closest	Closest
Piece price	Very low	Lowest	Lowest
Size range	0.5–12 in (13–305 mm)	0.5–24 in (13–610 mm)	0.5–24 in (13–610 mm)

The disparity in tooling cost and lead time is a result of the expensive and time-consuming machining required to produce the precision metal molds (dies) used with die-casting and plastic injection molding. The precision tooling and resilient nature of the machined metal die yields a long-lasting mold and slight improvements to casting tolerances. Thermoplastics and die casting metal alloys are in wider use than their specialized spin casting analogs, and are typically cheaper.

== Applications ==
Spin casting is commonly used for the manufacture of the following types of items:

- Gaming miniatures and figurines – in both metal and plastics.
- Fishing lures and fishing tackle components including jig heads and lead weights.
- Decorative and novelty type items – belt buckles, pins, emblems, medallions, trophies, assorted souvenirs etc.
- Industrial manufacturing and replacement part production.
- Rapid prototyping / rapid manufacturing – spin casting is an excellent adjunct process as it allows the quick and efficient production of fully functional copies from fragile rapid prototype models.

Because of low start up costs and ease of use, spin casting is available to individuals and businesses unable to make the deep investments required by die casting, injection molding or similar processes. These users include smaller business and design houses that would normally contract their work to production "job" shops, as well as hobbyists producing unique items for personal enjoyment. Thus, spin casting is accessible to a broader range of applications than competing technologies.

== See also ==
- Centrifugal casting (industrial) – Casting technique that is typically used to cast thin-walled cylinders, on an industrial scale
- Centrifugal casting (silversmithing) – Casting technique where a small mould is poured, then spun on the end of an arm, for a smaller scale
- Spin coating – Industrial procedure
- Rotating furnace – Device for making axially symmetric paraboloids
