= List of toy soldiers brands =

This is a list of worldwide brands and manufactures of toy soldiers.

A

- A Call To Arms
- Accurate
- Adventure Force
- Andrea Miniatures
- Airfix
- Almark
- Armourfast
- Atlantic (company)
- Aurora Plastics Corporation
- Armies In Plastic

B

- Barcelona Universal Models (BUM)
- Barclay
- Benbros
- Bergen Toy & Novelty Co. or Beton
- Billy V
- Britains
- BMC Toys
- Brevett
- Burlington Equestrian Models

C

- Caesar
- CBG Mignot
- Chota Sahib incorporating all former Studio Sarum Figurine ranges in 54MM and 90 MM Scale Full Copyright registered.
- Chialu
- Classic Toy Soldiers
- Co.Ma.
- Coates and Shin
- The Corps
- Crescent Toys

D

- Dorset Toy soldiers
- Dapol
- Dark Dream Studio
- Deetail – A Britains brand.
- Ducal Makes all former Jack and Thelma Duc series figures in 54MM Scale Metal.Full Copyright Registered.
- Dulcop
- Durso

E

- Eagle Games
- Eduard
- Elastolin
- Elite Force
- Emhar
- Ente Scambi Coloniali Internazionali (ESCI)
- Expeditionary force
- Evolution

F

- First To Fight
- Fleurbaix Toy Soldiers
- Fujimi
- Fun Little Toys
- Figurart

G

- GerMan
- Giant
- Greenbrier International
- Gulliver

H

- Hasegawa
- HaT
- Hegemony
- Heller
- Herald Miniatures – A Britains brand.
- Hero Force
- (Heyde) - Dresden, Germany before World War II

I

- Ideal Toy Company
- IMEX
- Italeri

J

- Jack Scruby
- John Hill & Company
- Joyin

K

- Kienel
- King And Country
- Kombat

L

- Liberty Imports
- Little Legion
- Legio
- Linear-A
- Linear-B
- Leyla
- Lineol
- Lone Star Toys
- Louis Marx and Company
- Lucky Toys
- LW

M

- Manoil
- Mars
- Matchbox
- Metch
- Miniart
- MM
- Model Kasten
- Model Products Corporation (MPC)
- Mountford Military Models Incorporating the entire former Artillery Range and Figures and Kits in 1/32 Scale Full Copyright registered.
- Monogram

N

- Nexus

O

- Odemar
- Orion
- Osul

P

- Panzer vs Tanks
- Pegasus
- Plastic Soldier Company (PSC)
- Pobeda
- Preiser
- Prince August

Prince August Q

- Quiralu

R

- RedBox
- Rose Ancient Series Figures Incorporating all former John Eden and ROSE Russel Gammge Ancient figures in 1/32 scale Full Copyright Registered

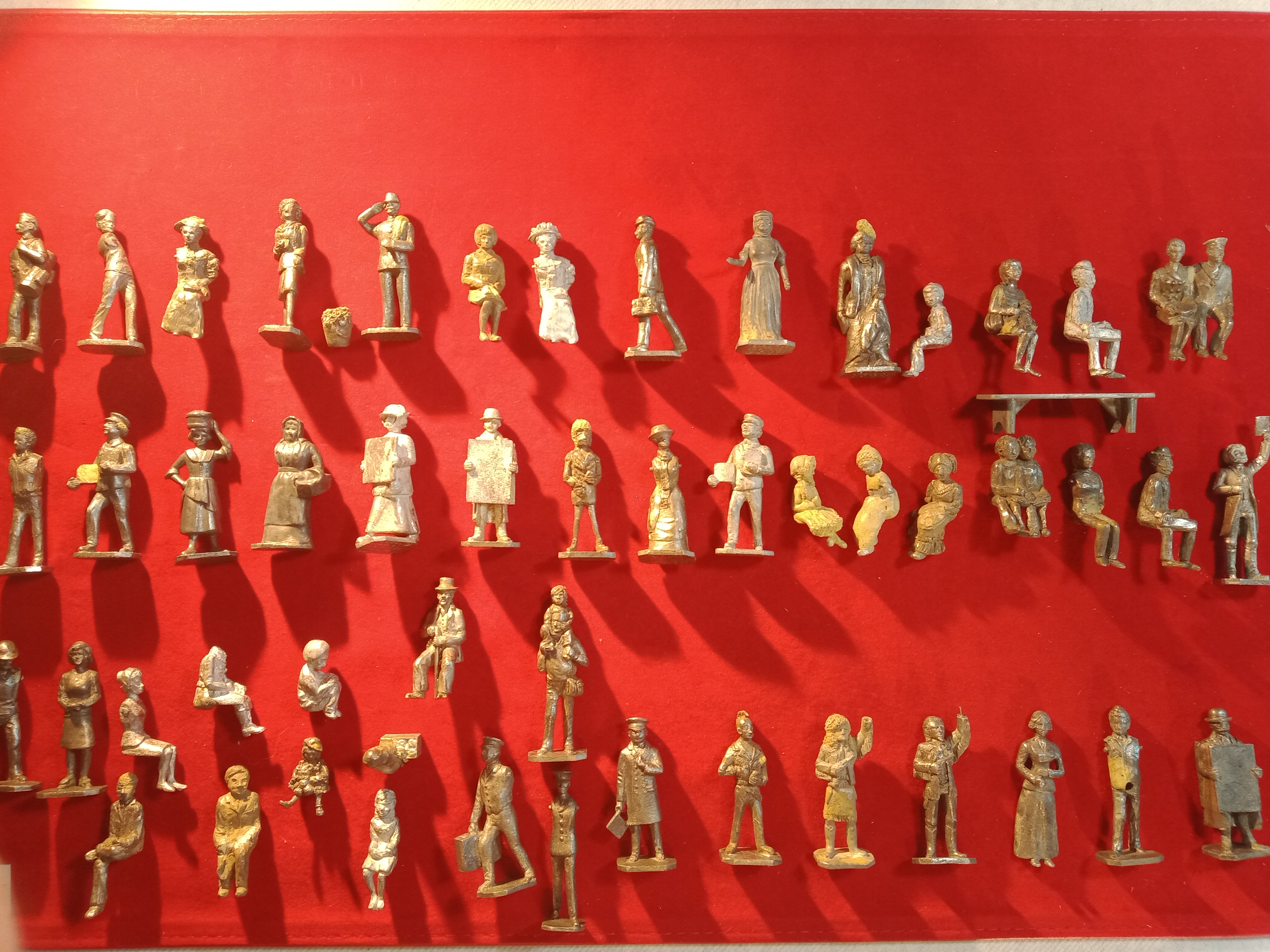

- Rosedale Large Scale Figures and 54 MM Figures and Metal Kits.
- Revell

S

- Schylling
- SCS Direct
- Studio Paris Art Incorporating in entirety all Ex "Sarum Soldiers" figurine range. "Studio Figurines" and all Ex Sarum " Chota Sahib" Figures in 54 MM and 90 Mm Scale.(An E.U. Business Zone Company). NOTE NOT "Studio Model Design"Full Copyright Registered
- Sanderson
- Strelets

T

- Trophy Miniatures of Wales
- T-Model
- Tamiya
- Testor's
- Timpo Toys
- Tim Mee Toys
- Toxso
- Toymendous
- Toysmith
- Tragik
- Trico
- True Heroes
- T.S.S.D.

U

- Ultima Ratio
- Under Two Flags
- Universal Plastics

V

- Valdemar
- Valiant
- Vertunni

W

- Wend-Al
- warhansa
- Waterloo 1815
- WowToyz

X Y

- Ykreol

Z

- Zvezda
