= Benbros =

Toy manufacturer from the United Kingdom

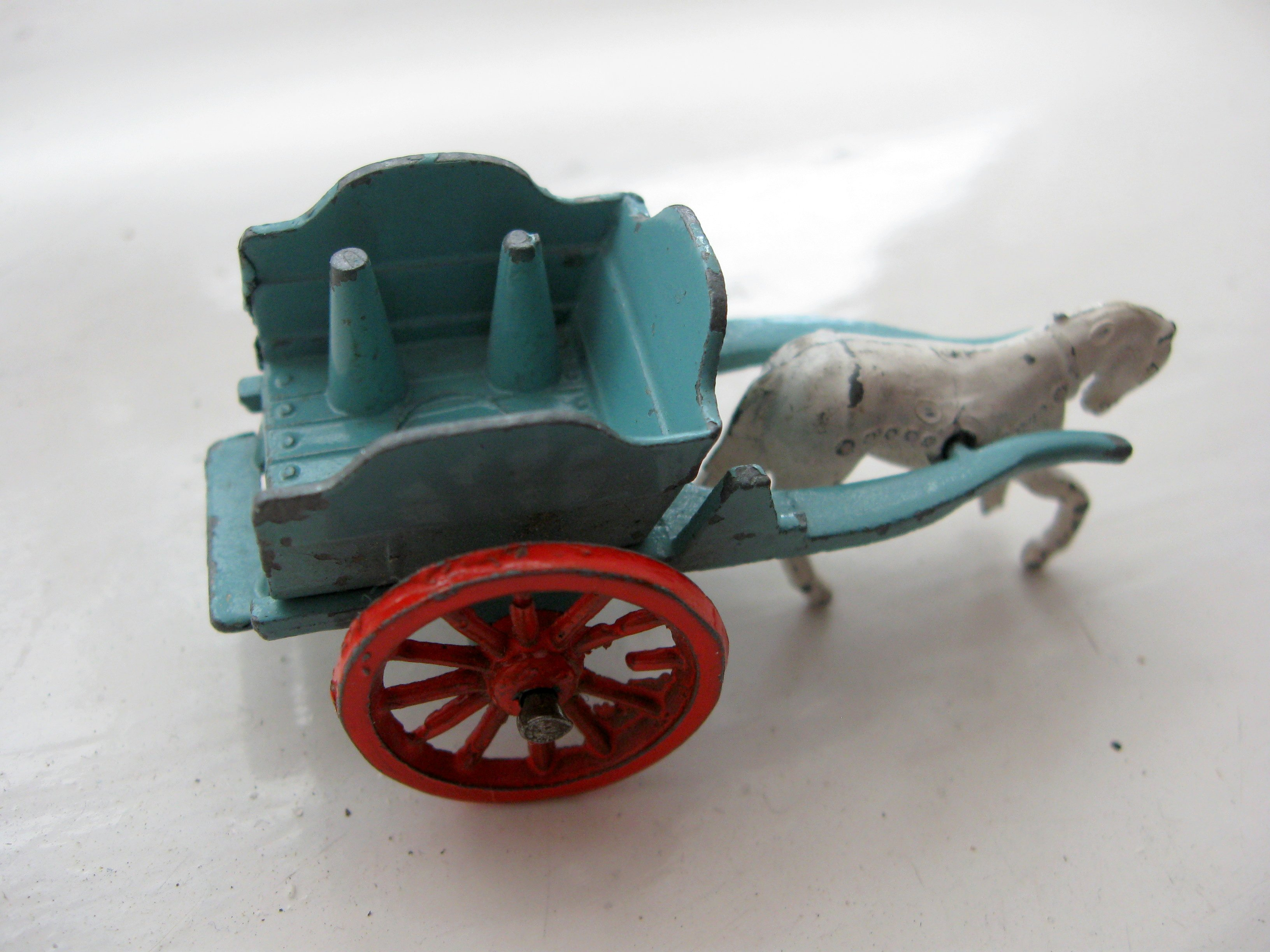
Benbros model of horse drawn water cart, circa 1959

Benbros (London) Ltd was a British toy company in existence from the late 1940s to 1965.

The company was founded by two brothers, Jack and Nathan Benenson, the name, a contraction of "Benenson Brothers", was adopted in 1951 and the company was based at 145, Gosport Road, Walthamstow.

Benbros produced:

- Die cast metal model cars and farm machinery under the names of "Qualitoys" and "T.V. Series" that came packed in a box that looked like a television set that were later retitled "Mighty Midgets".
- "Zebra Toys" that came in black and white striped boxes that were better quality models.
- Hollow cast metal Robin Hood, cowboy and Indian figures and toy soldiers.

Timpo Toys sold several of their moulds to Benbros, which can lead to collectors to having difficulty identifying which company made some figures.
