= Durso =

Durso is a surname. Notable people with the surname include:

- Edwin Durso, American television executive
- Joe Durso (1924–2004), American sportswriter
- Joe Durso (handballer) (born 1955), American handball player
- John Durso Jr., American communications consultant
- Robert Durso (born 1959), Italian-American pianist
- Rodney Durso, American contemporary artist and graphic designer
