= Imperial Productions (New Zealand) =

New Zealand toy soldier manufacturer

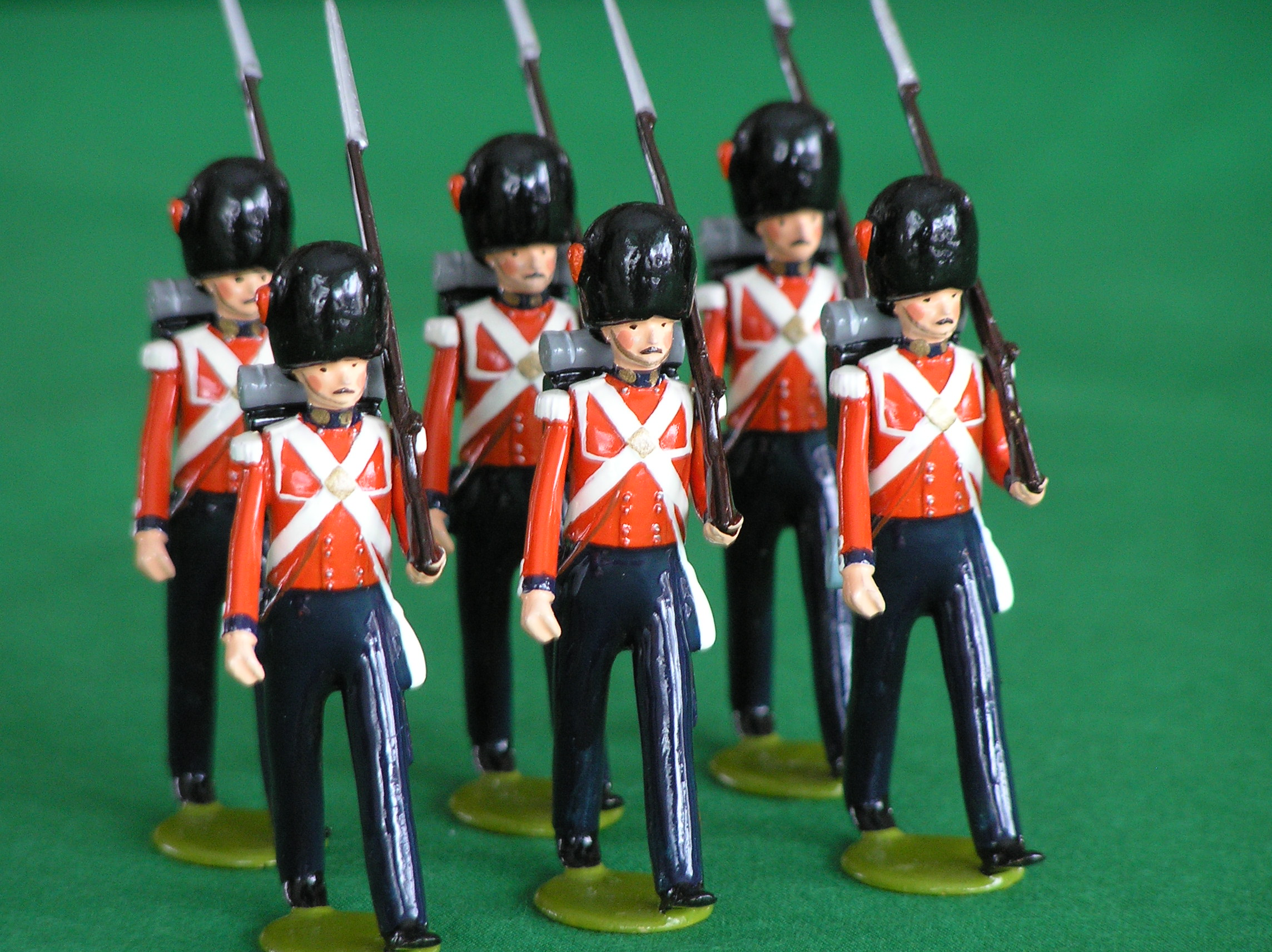
Imperial Productions' British Coldstream Guards

Imperial Productions is a manufacturer of toy soldiers in Greytown, New Zealand. Operating since 1982, it produces 54mm cast pewter figurines which are painted by hand. The miniatures depict mostly soldiers from the British Army in Napoleonic times through to World War II, as well as Māori and Victorian civilians.

== Origin ==
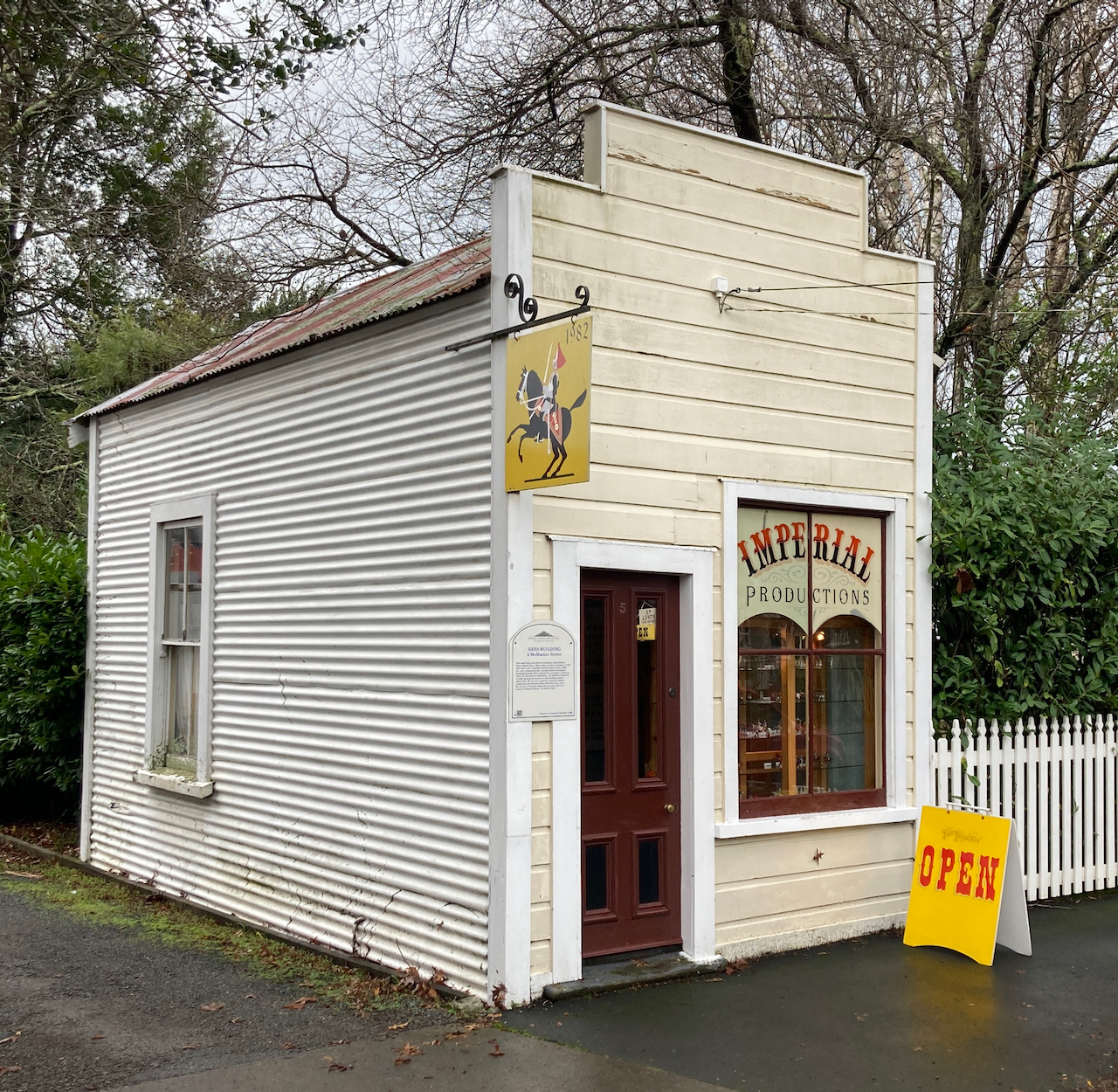
Imperial Productions shop, McMaster Street, Greytown

Imperial Productions was founded by David Cowe in 1982. Born in Lower Hutt, Cowe was the youngest of three boys, and received their hand-me-down pre-WWII lead toy soldiers to play with which sparked an interest in model making and military history. He later completed a diploma in graphic design and moved to London in the 1960s to attend Saint Martin's School of Art. On his return to New Zealand, he worked as a freelance illustrator and started a graphic design business as well as teaching at the Wellington School of Design. While living in Greytown with his family of three daughters, he noticed toy soldiers advertised in a UK magazine and decided to try making his own.

Cowe began casting soldiers commercially in 1982. In 1987 he opened a shop and showroom in a tiny building on McMaster Street, just off Greytown's main street, which was originally the Greytown bootmaker's shop. Sales were initially by telephone and mail, but are now largely online and international.

== The soldiers ==
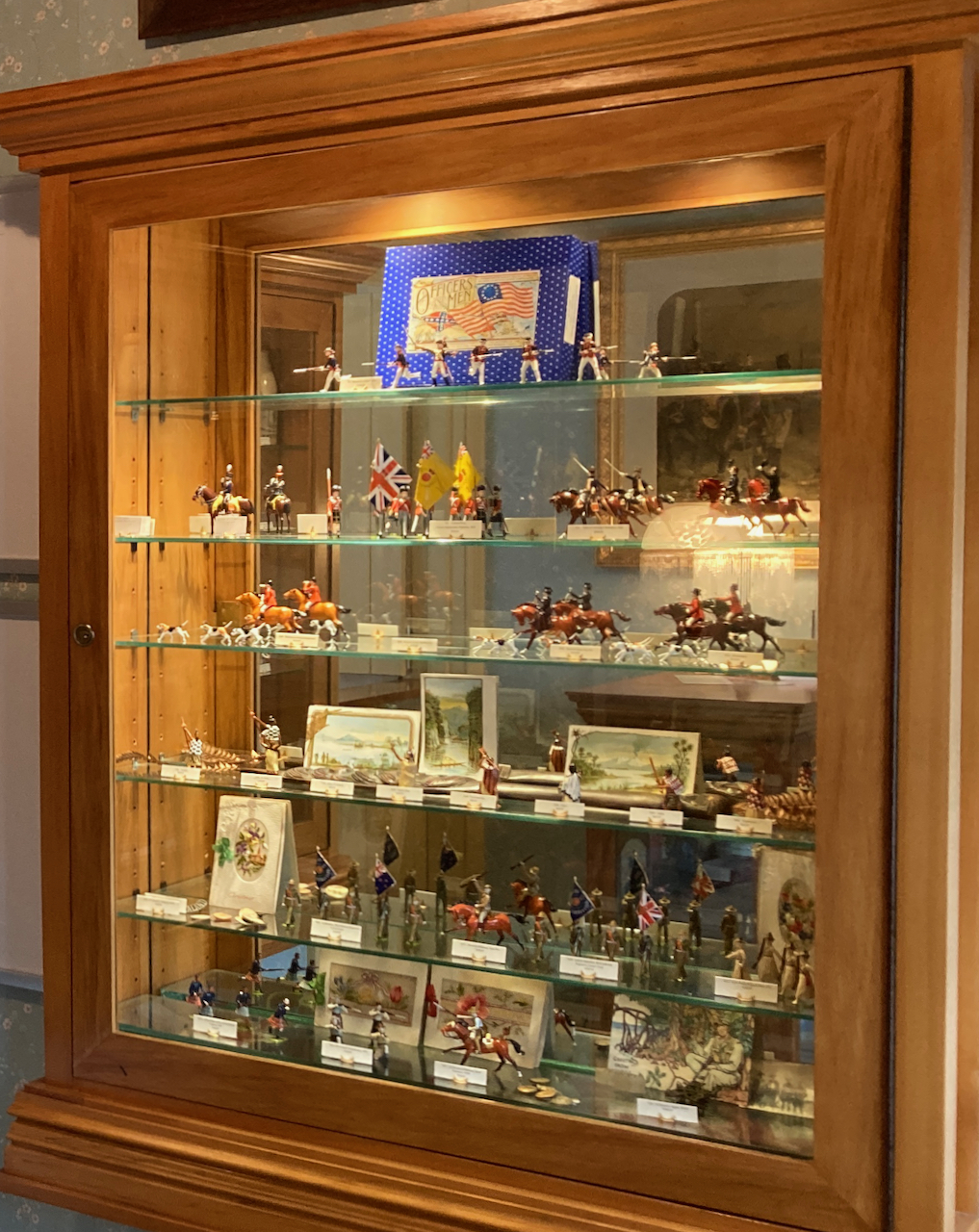
A display case of 54 mm toy soldiers inside Imperial Productions

Imperial Productions soldiers are cast in lead free pewter (tin) at 54 mm (2.25 inches) or 1:32 scale, the traditional "normal size" for the toy soldiers first used by W. Britain and European manufacturers in the 19th century. Masters are sculpted in resin, then a silicone rubber mould is created. A 97% tin (0% lead) alloy is melted at 280°C and cast in the mould, and the resulting master is used to make a silicone mould for mass production. The company produced more than 1000 hand-cast and hand-painted figurines a year; since 1998 Cowe's daughter Lisa Cowe-Kirk has painted the soldiers in traditional gloss enamel colours.

The soldiers generally range from Napoleonic to World War II, and include British military forces such as the 1st Foot Guards, Coldstream Guards from the Crimean War, and Camel Corps, dervishes, and Winston Churchill from the 1898 Battle of Omdurman. New Zealand figurines include Māori in traditional dress, the New Zealand Girls' Khaki Brigade, and Armed Constabulary from 1870. There are also Victorian civilian figurines including women, children, and domestic animals.
