= John Durso Jr. =

American communications professional

John Durso Jr. is a communications professional who has served in lead, highly visible roles in government, energy, transportation and sports. Most recently. he served as chief spokesperson and principal communications and public affairs strategist for the 147th running of the Belmont Stakes, highlighted by American Pharoah's attainment of horse racing's "Triple Crown" for the first time in 37 years.

== Early life ==
Durso was born into a political family in New York's Long Island, with a mother serving as a Nassau County Republican committeewoman and a father serving as President of the Long Island AFL-CIO. According to a profile in the May 23, 2011 edition of "The Capitol" (see later published as "City and State"), this upbringing resulted in a focus on "bi-partisanship" and "bringing people together".

== Education ==
Durso is a graduate of Kellenberg Memorial High School in Uniondale, New York and Siena College in Loudonville, New York.

== Career ==
Durso began his career as an aide to former New York Governor George Pataki and eventually moved into a senior level role with the New York Republican State Committee, serving as the organization's Political Director under Pataki's leadership. In 2006, Durso began service as Director of Communications to Monroe County Executive Maggie Brooks.

Two years later, Durso assumed the leadership of the New York Affordable Reliable Electricity Alliance, an energy trade group composed of business, labor and environmental representatives focusing on developing energy policy solutions to New York's growing demands. In this role, he served as a registered lobbyist for the organization, which played a role in the passage of a new New York State power plant siting law replacing the expired Article X statute.

As the head of the Electricity Alliance, Durso was a prominent spokesperson for securing new, sustainable base load power resources in New York State and also served as a top voice in support of re-licensing the Indian Point Energy Center in Buchanan, New York Entergy, the operator of Indian Point, is a member of the Electricity Alliance. Durso was also a leading voice in support of Indian Point during the 2011 nuclear crisis involving Japan's Fukushima Daiichi nuclear facility.

In late 2011, Durso joined NJ Transit, serving as the top spokesperson for the nation's third-largest public transportation network. Durso regularly provided live media briefings in the New York City and Philadelphia regions regarding service disruptions and operational planning. In the aftermath of Superstorm Sandy in 2012, Durso was a national voice outlining the storm's destruction of, and impact on the region's transportation system. Durso was also a regular media presence detailing the agency's response to the storm, as well as planning for future infrastructure resiliency.

In 2014, Durso joined the New York Racing Association as Director of Communications and Media Relations for the organization's three race tracks encompassing Aqueduct Racetrack in Queens, Belmont Park in Nassau County, and Saratoga Race Course in Upstate New York. In this capacity, Durso served as principal spokesperson for the organization's two most prominent and historic thoroughbred races, the Belmont Stakes at Belmont Park, and the Travers Stakes at Saratoga Race Course.
