= John Hill & Company =

British toy company

John Hill & Company (Johillco)
- Company type: Private
- Industry: Entertainment
- Founded: 1898
- Founder: F. H. Wood
- Defunct: 1960s
- Headquarters: Burnley, United Kingdom
- Products: Toy soldiers, figurines
- Brands: Hilco

John Hill & Company or Johillco was a British toy company specialising in the manufacture of hollowcast metal and later plastic toy soldiers becoming second to W. Britain in popularity. It is unknown where the name of John Hill came from.

== History ==
John Hill & Co was started in 1898 by a former employee of W. Britain named Mr F. H Wood. In contrast to Britains, Johillco was the first British hollowcast figure company to sell their figures individually leading to competition from Britains who later began to sell individual figures and figures painted less ornately to be sold in variety stores like the F. W. Woolworth Company.

Johillco also manufactured coronation and other souvenir items.

The firm's original factory was located at 2-22 Britannia Row, Islington, London but the factory was bombed during World War II. In August 1946 the company reopened under new management in Plumbe Street Burnley. Also after World War II, Johillco's chief figure designer Wilfred Cherrington in conjunction with a Mr Leaver started his own company called Cherilea.

In their book The Art of the Toy Soldier, the authors note that due to the cheapness of the figures and the individuality of their poses, Johillco figures were found more in working-class homes than the expensive Britains that came in boxes of rigid identical poses. The authors also noted the company probably used a variety of sculptors leading to various grades of quality of Johillco figures, that the authors call "the good, the bad, and the ugly".

In addition to toy soldiers and cowboys and Indians, Johillco made many figures of knights and a movie tie-in set of figurines from MGM's Quo Vadis movie as well as space figures such as astronauts, robots, and aliens.

Johillco was slow to realise the effect of production in plastic. From 1956 they began making plastic figures in their hollowcast moulds under the name of "Hilco" but the company ceased in the early 1960s.
