= Edwin Durso =

American television executive

- Education: Harvard
- Employer: ESPN
- Title: Executive Vice President/Administration of ESPN

Edwin M. Durso was the executive vice president/administration of ESPN, Inc. He has helped to build ESPN since 1989.

== Education ==
Durso attended Harvard and played shortstop on the baseball team. He graduated in 1975, cum laude. In 1978, Durso received his law degree with honors from the George Washington University Law School.

== Career ==
Durso worked at the D.C. law firm Cole, Raywid and Braverman from July 1978 to November 1979.

In January 1985, Durso was appointed general counsel and secretary-treasurer of Major League Baseball. He spent ten years in the Office of the Commissioner.

Durso joined ESPN in 1989 and retired in December 2017 after 28 years at the network. He started his career with the company as senior vice president and general counsel and was a close advisor to presidents Steve Bornstein, George Bodenheimer, and John Skipper.

In December 1990, he was promoted to executive vice president and general council.

ESPN Leadership was launched in 1992 under his supervision. In February 1996, Durso was named executive vice president of administration.
