= Timpo =

English toy company

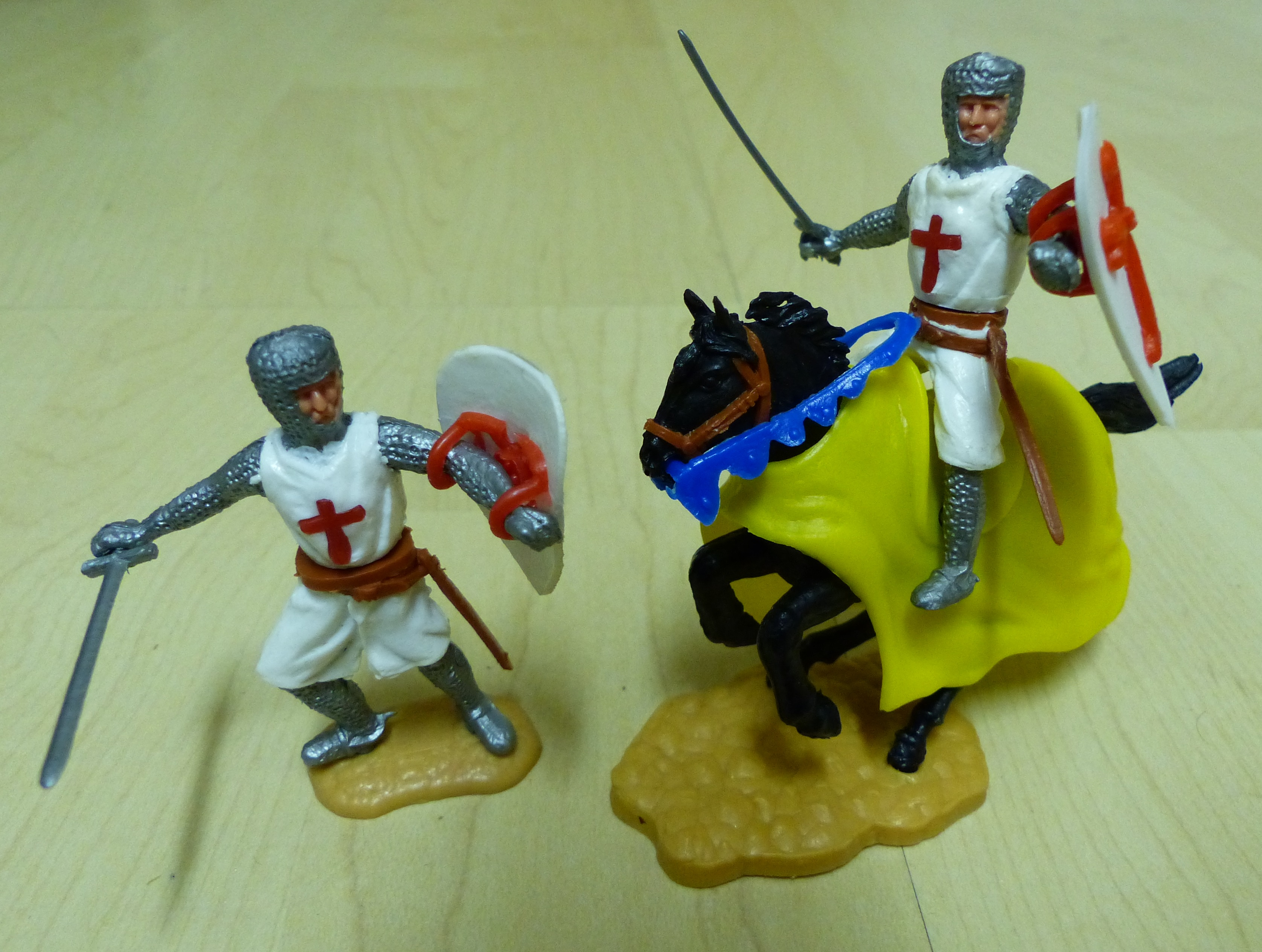
TIMPO figures: Crusaders

Timpo Toys Ltd. was a British toy company created in 1938 by Salomon "Sally" Gawrylovitz (born in Frankfurt 1907, died September 28, 2000, in Zug, Switzerland), also known as Ally Gee.

== History ==
A Jewish refugee from Germany, Gawrylovitz started as Toy Importers Company known as TIMPO in 1938. The company manufactured various toys out of wood, bakelite and composition until the end of World War II.

Following the war, Timpo made hollowcast metal toy soldiers; with soldiers manufactured in plastic from 1954.

The firm ceased operations in 1978.

== Timpo Toys series ==
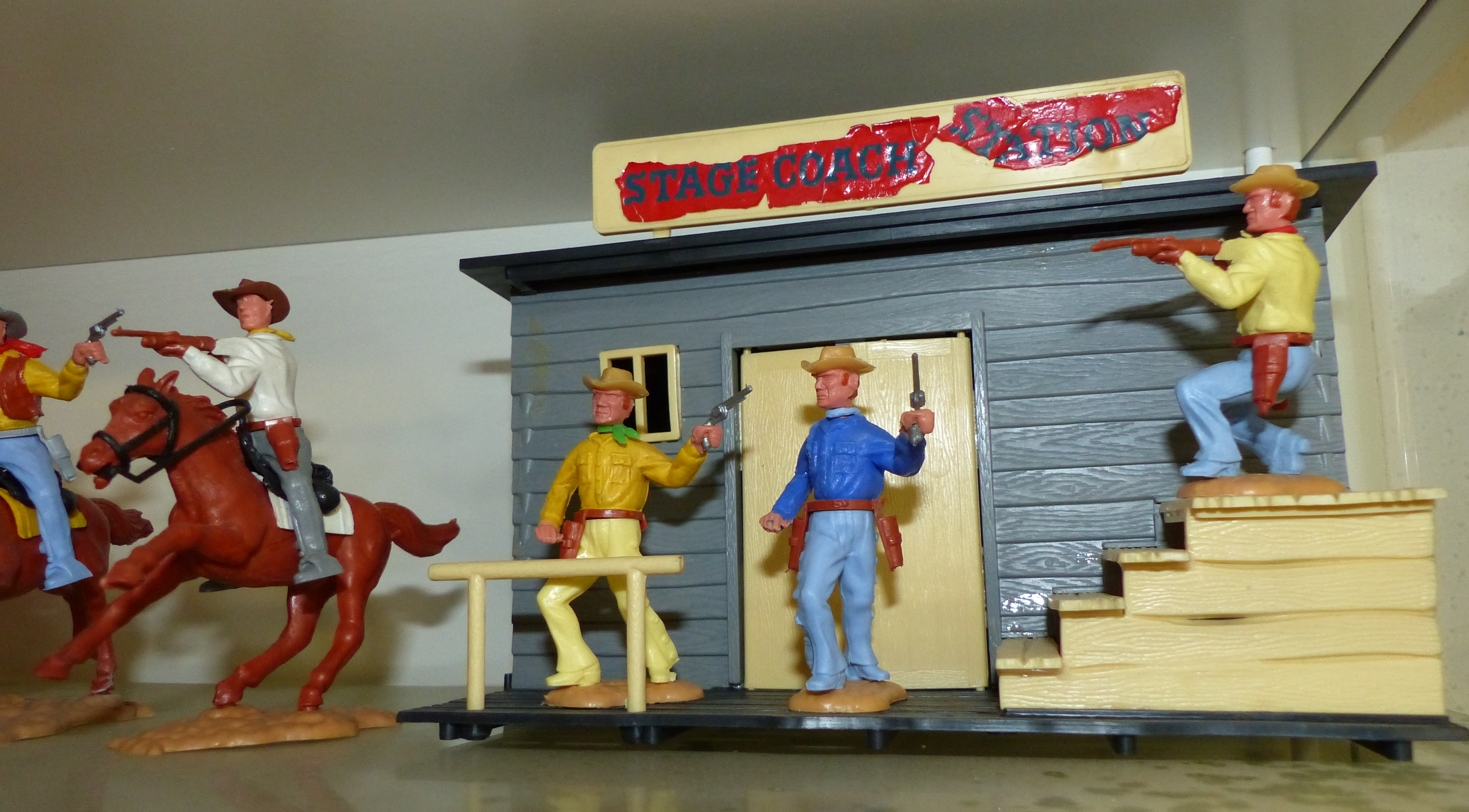
American frontier series – Cowboys

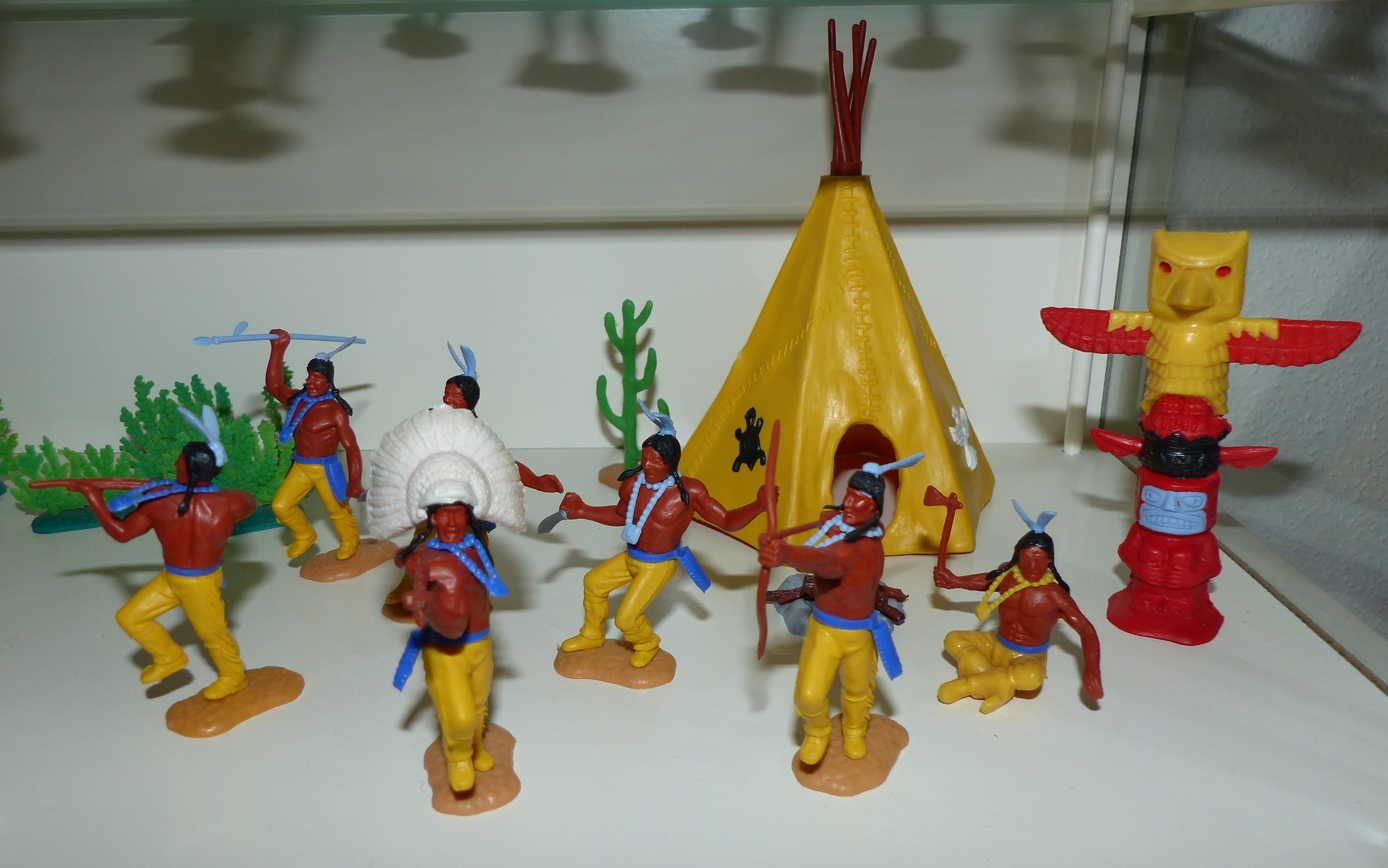
American frontier series – Native Americans

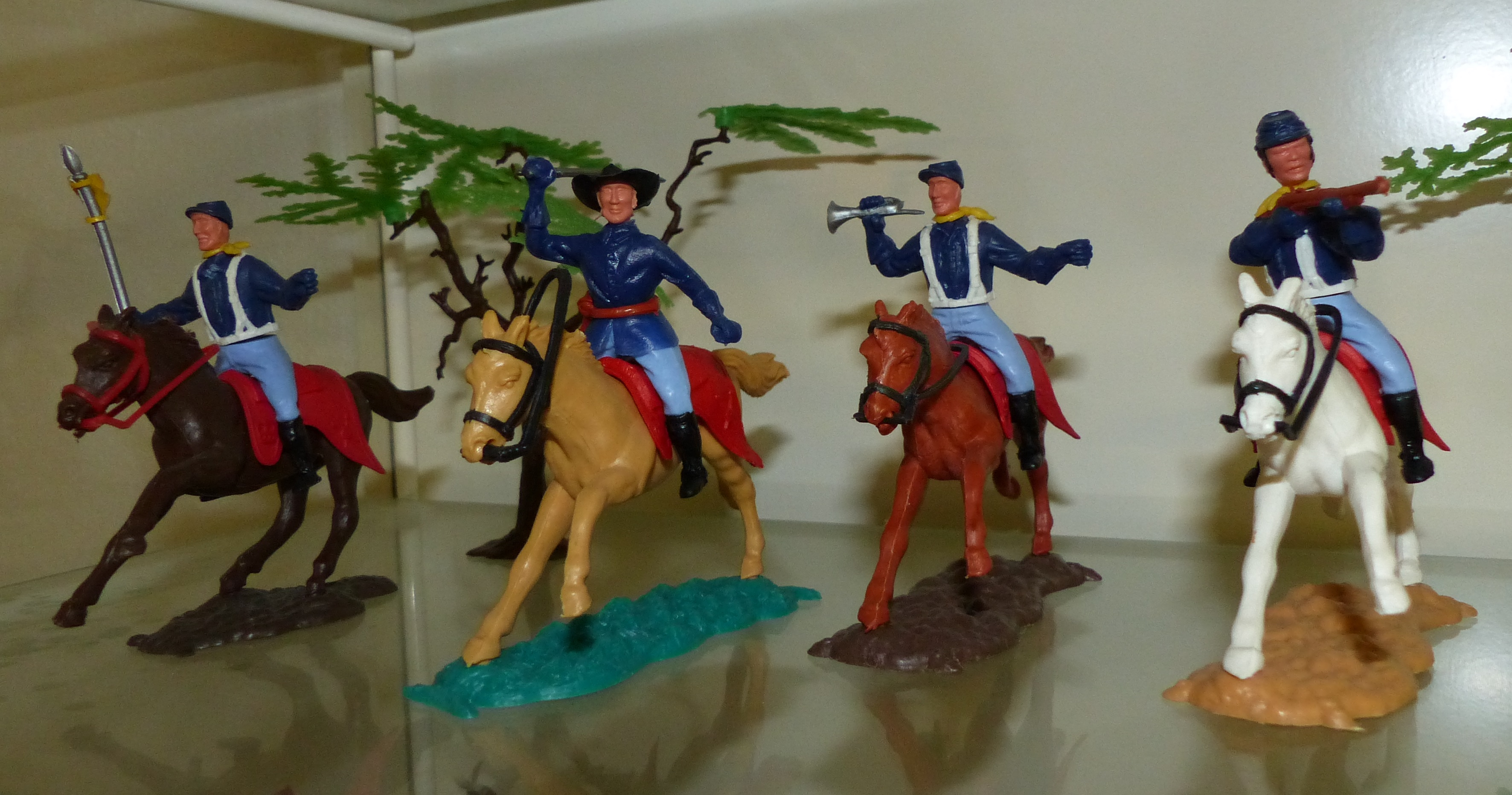
American frontier series – 7th Cavalry Regiment

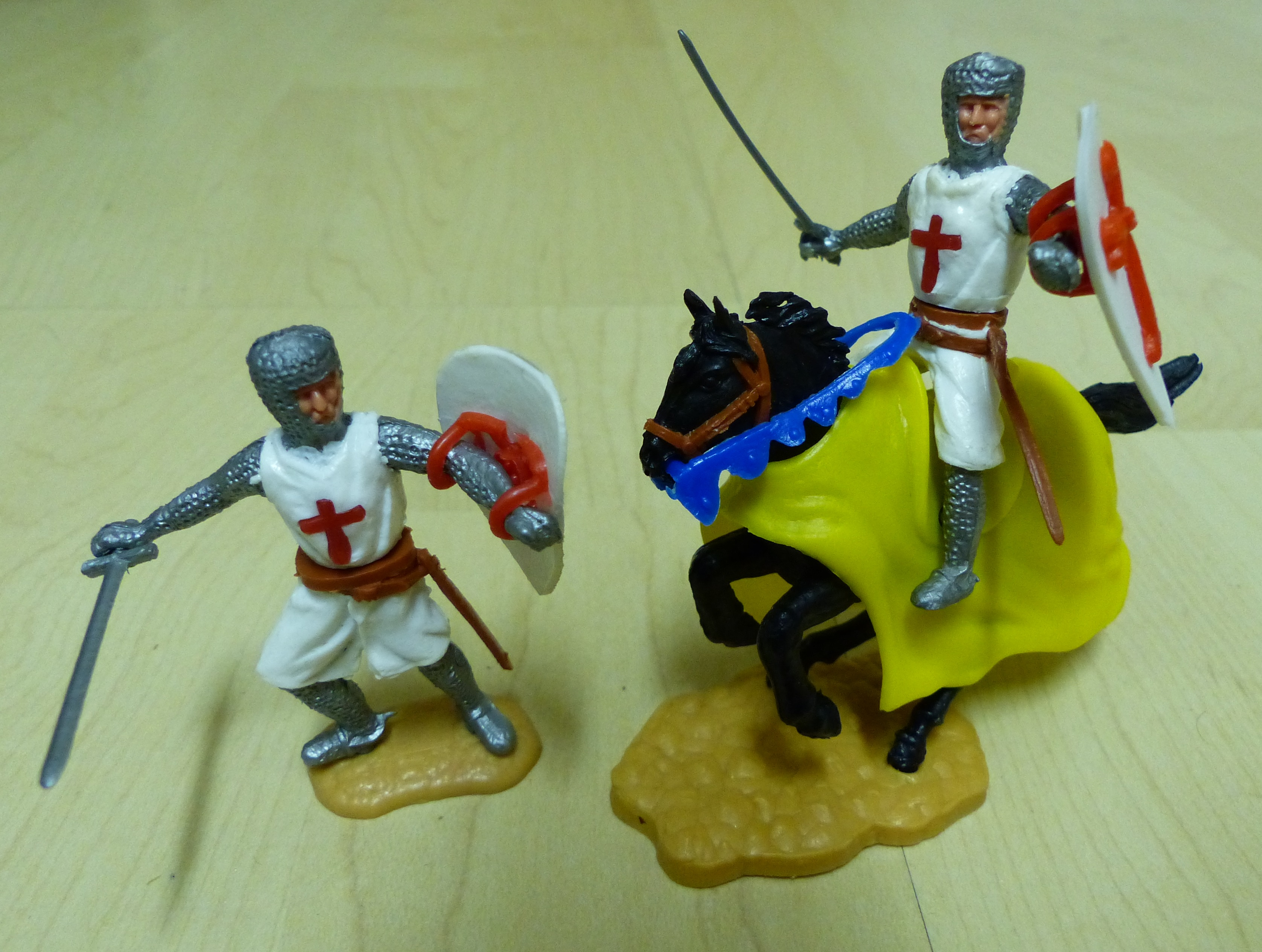
Knight series – Crusaders: The swords, reins and the horse blanket are replicas

The assortment of Timpo Toys consisted of several figurine series, with the American frontier series and the Knight series forming the core of the product range. Since Timpo further developed the series in the course of production, some series could be divided into generations (e.g. there are four generations within the Cowboy series).

Overview of the series:

- American frontier series
  - Cowboy series
  - Native Americans and Apache series
  - Union Army series
  - Confederate States Army series
  - Mexican series
- Knight series
  - Crusader series
  - Medieval Knights series
  - Vizor Knights series
  - Gold Knights series
  - Silver Knights series
  - Black Knights series
- Other series
  - Romans series
  - Vikings series
  - Arabs series
  - French Foreign Legions series
  - American Revolutionary War series
  - Inuit series
  - World War II series
  - Farm series
  - Guard series

== Picture gallery ==
The following pictures show examples of Timpo plastic figures.

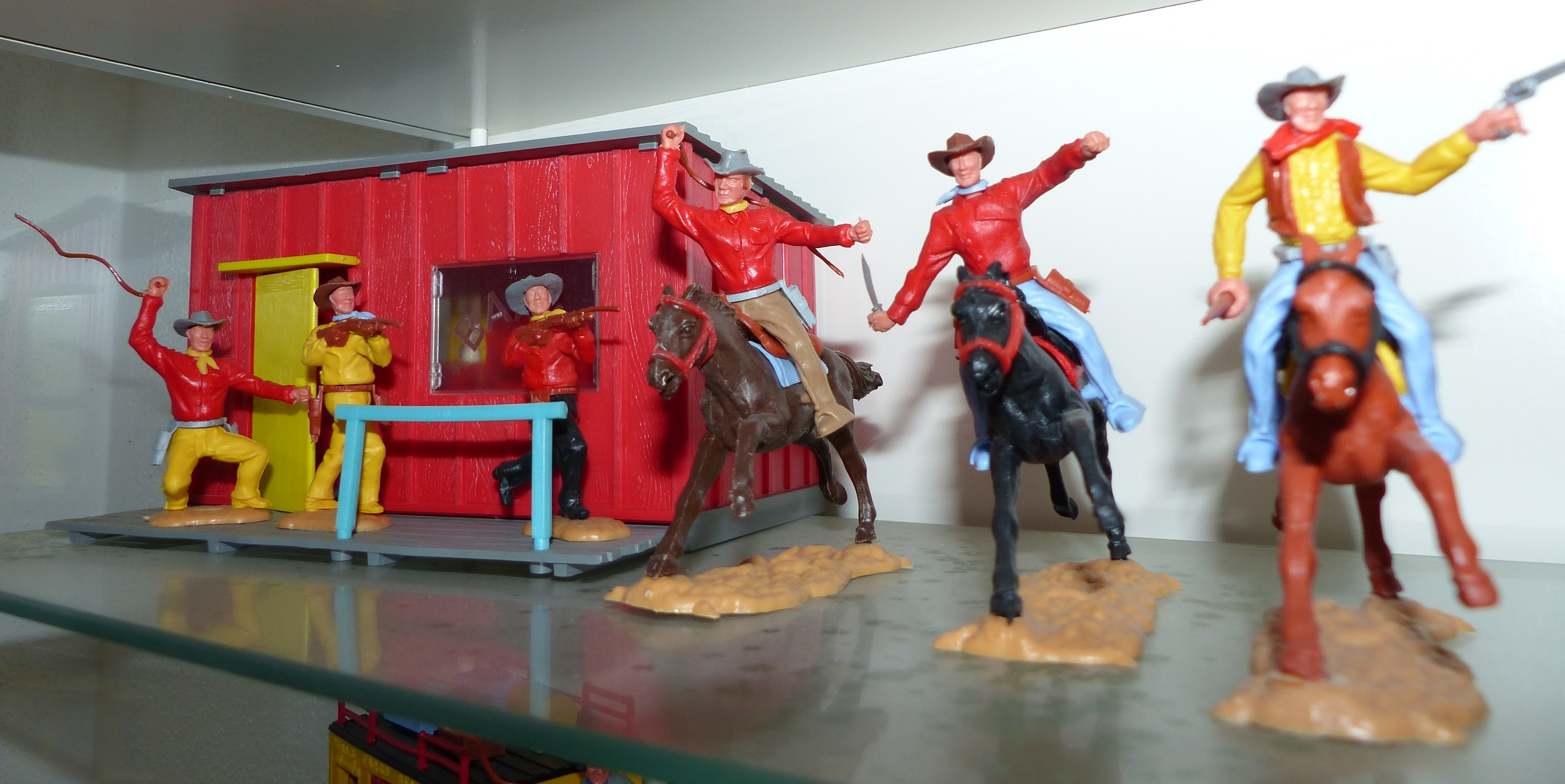
American frontier series – Cowboys

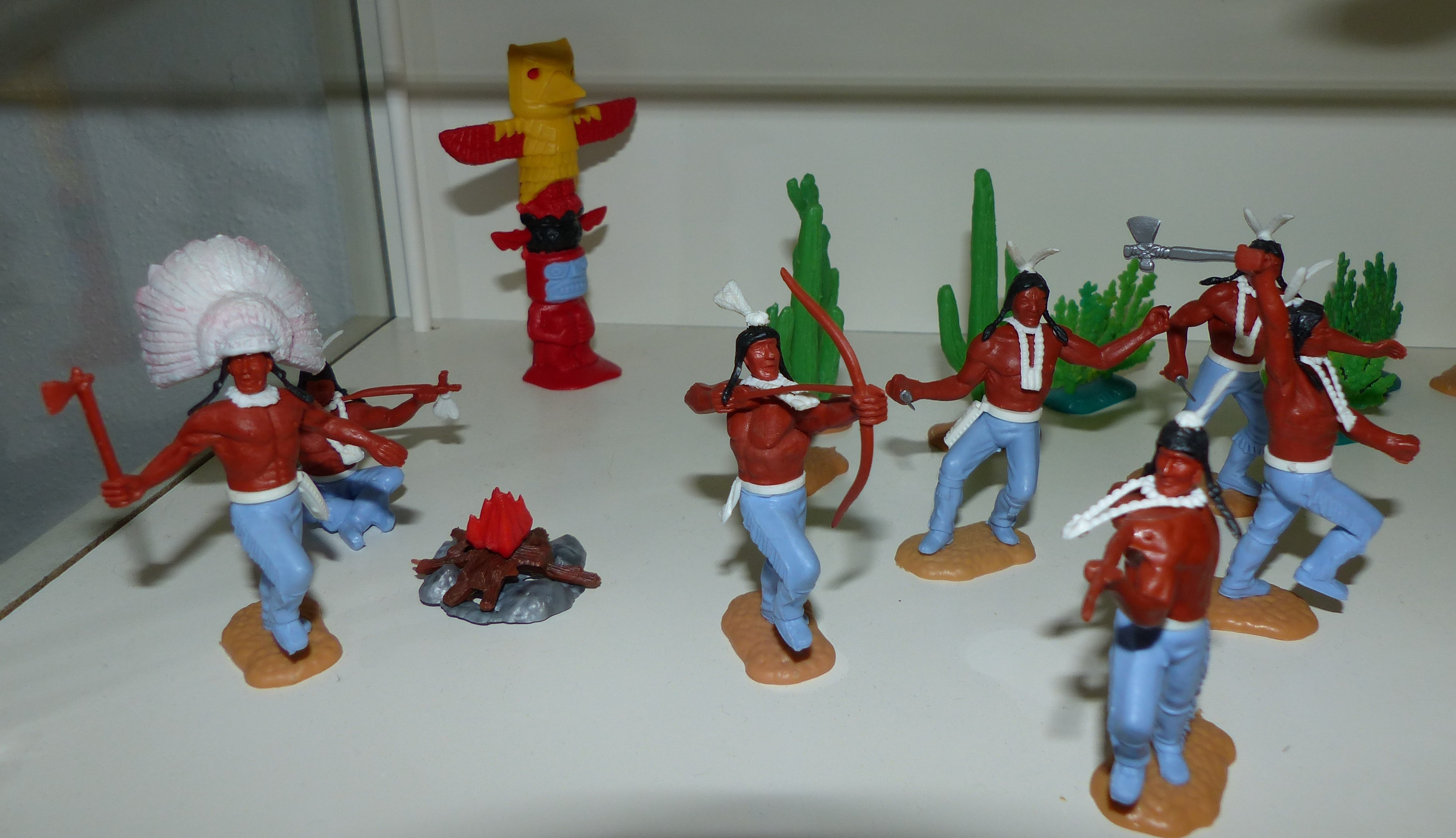
American frontier series – Native Americans

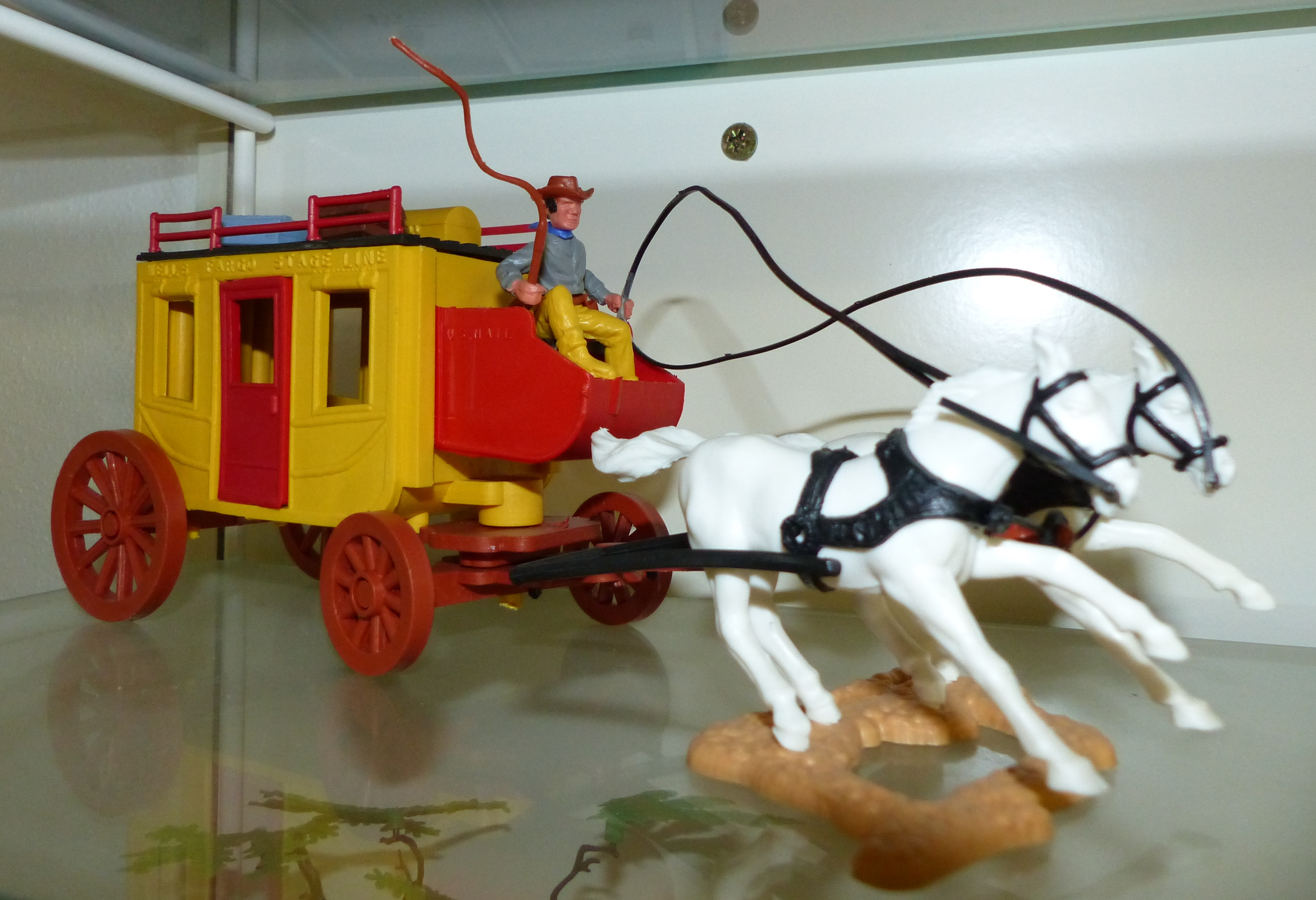
American frontier series – Stagecoach

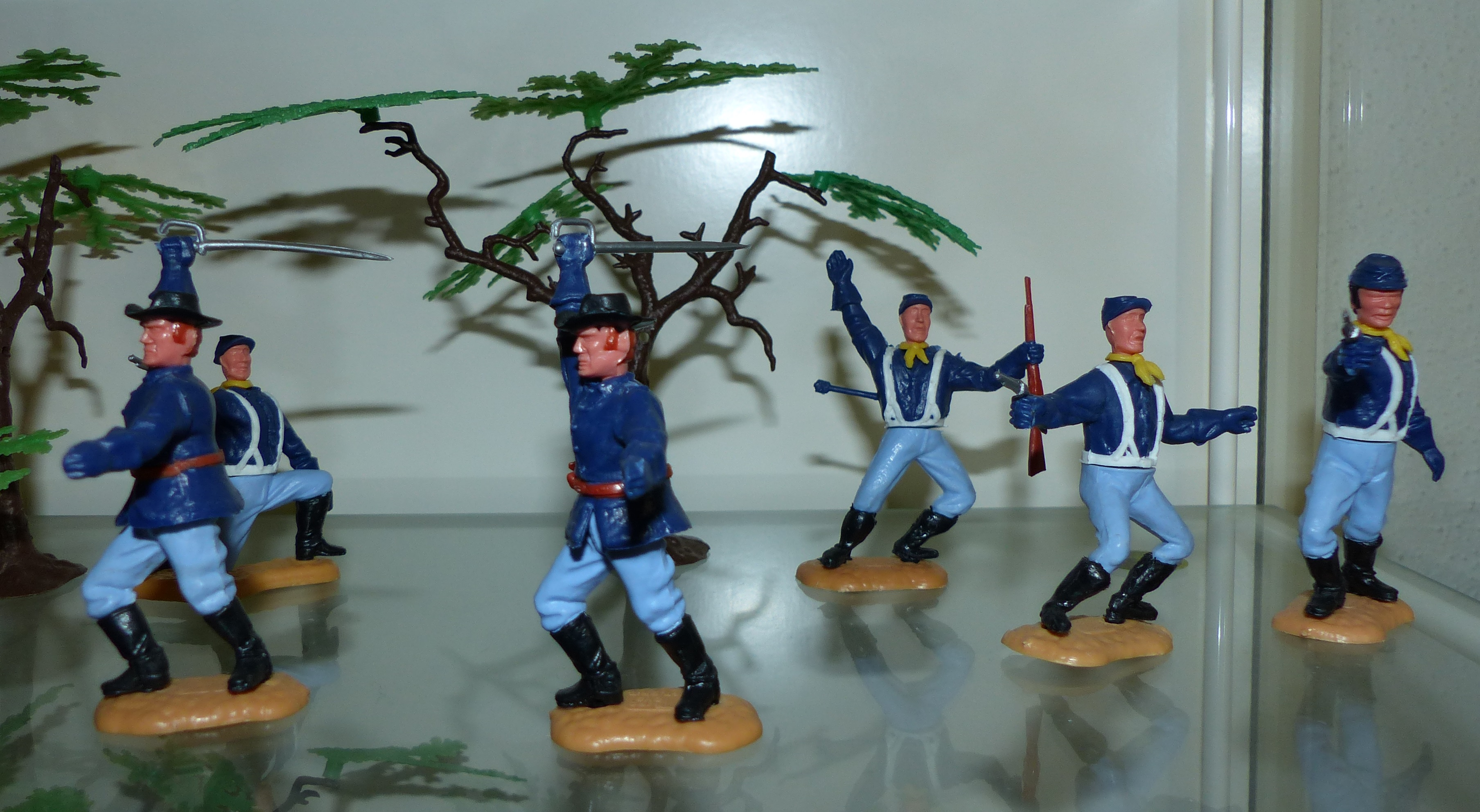
Soldiers of the Confederate States Army

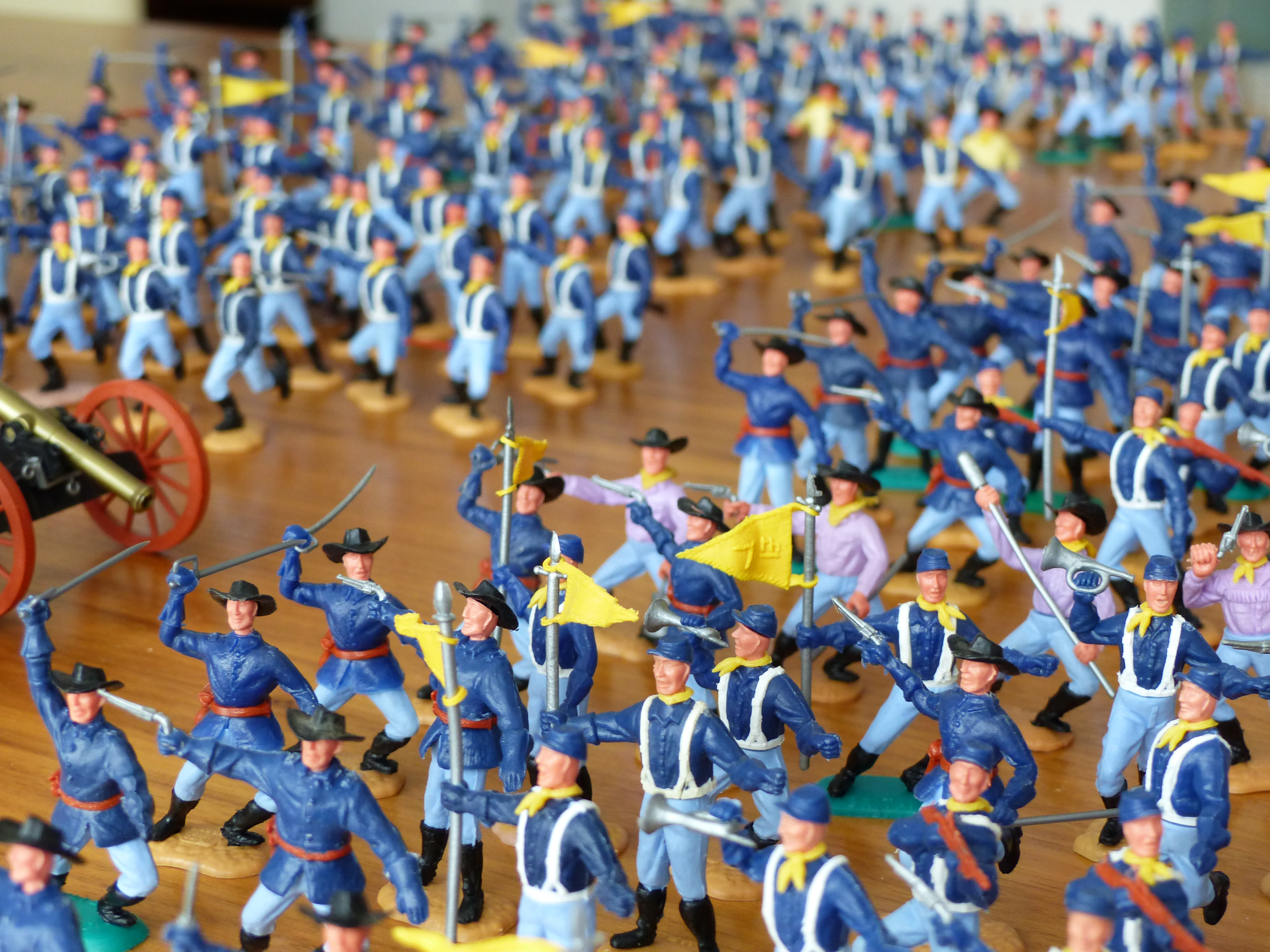
Soldiers of the Union Army

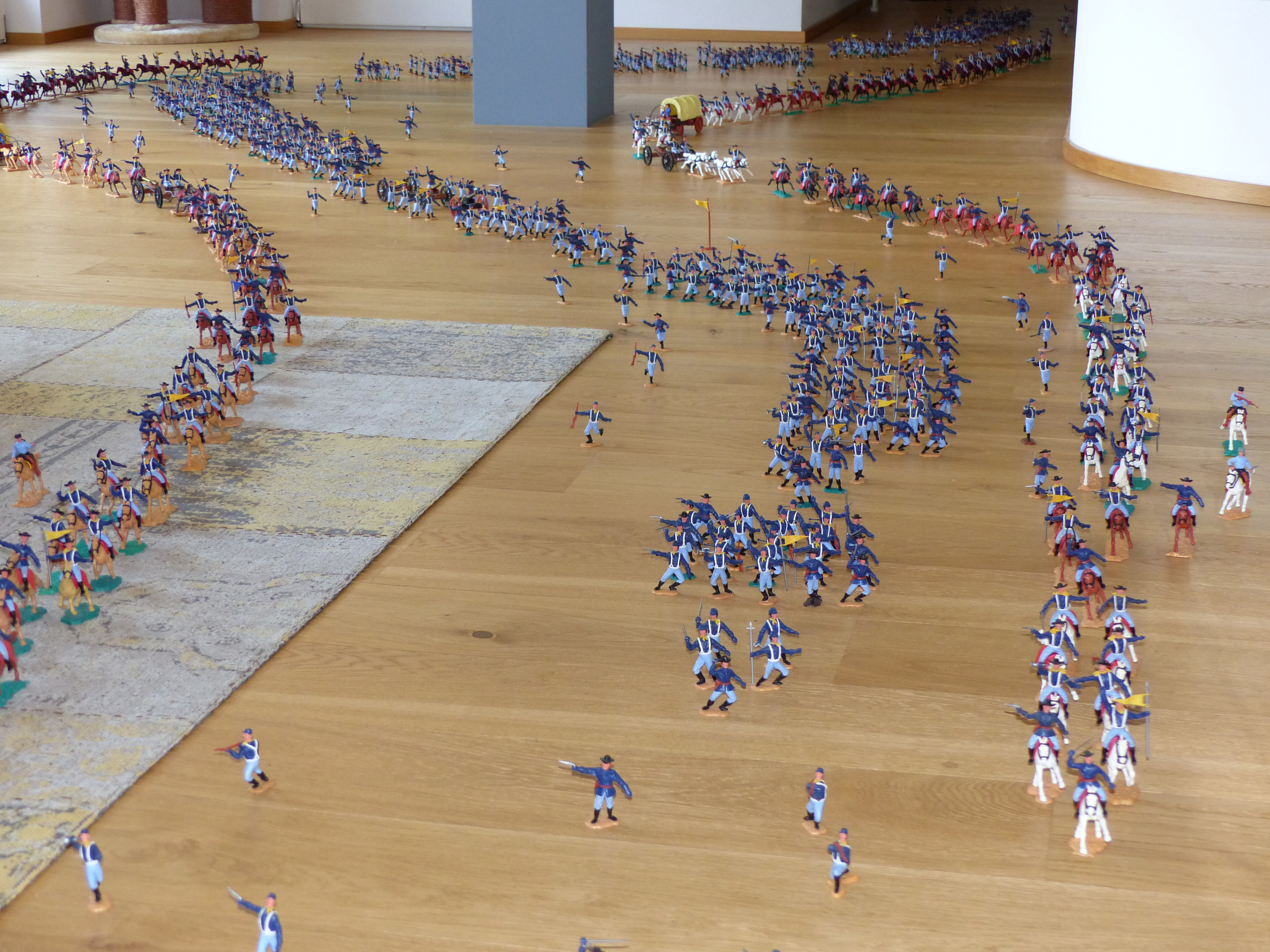
Soldiers of the Union Army and the 7th Cavalry Regiment series

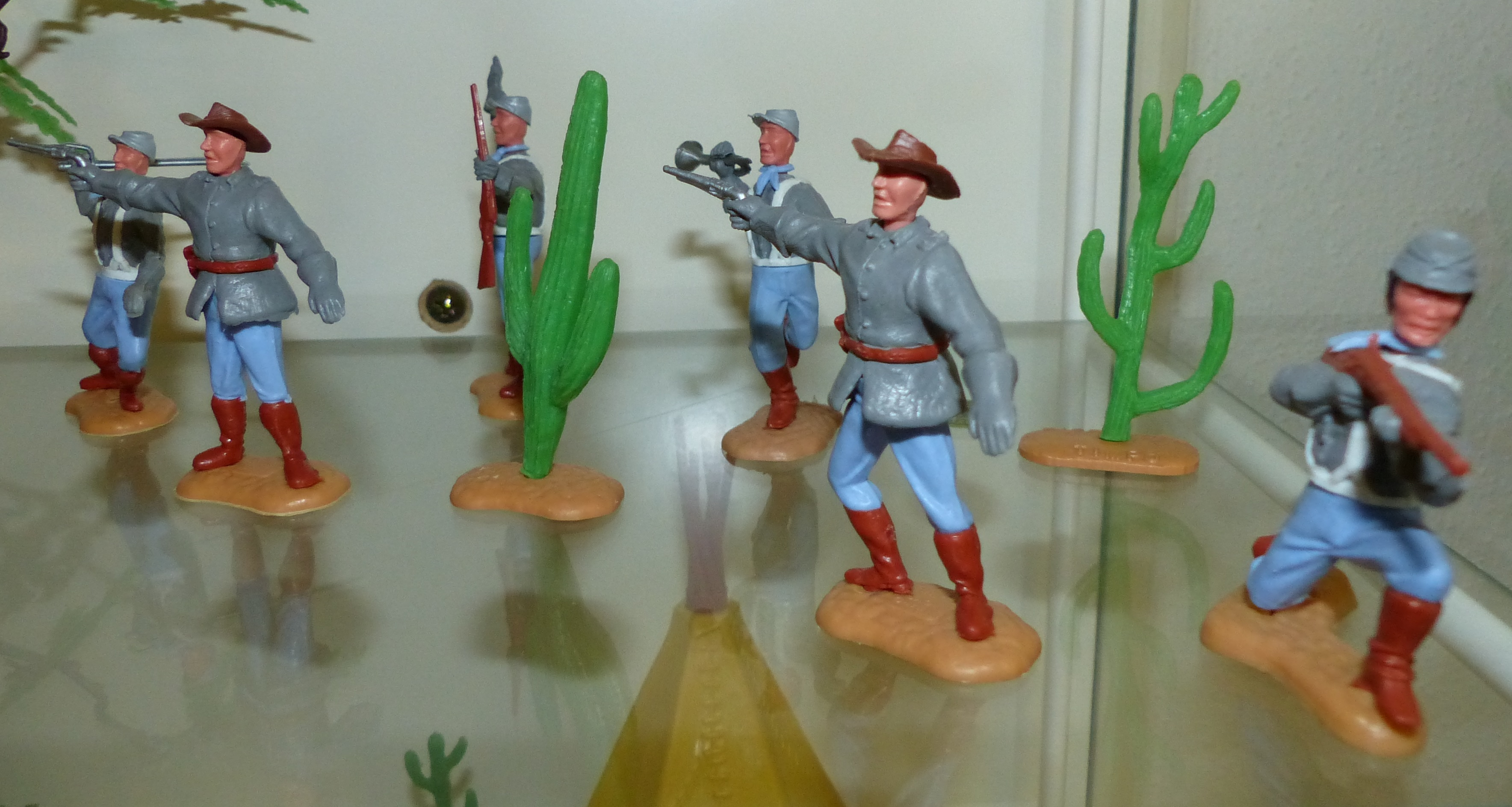
Soldiers of the Confederate States Army

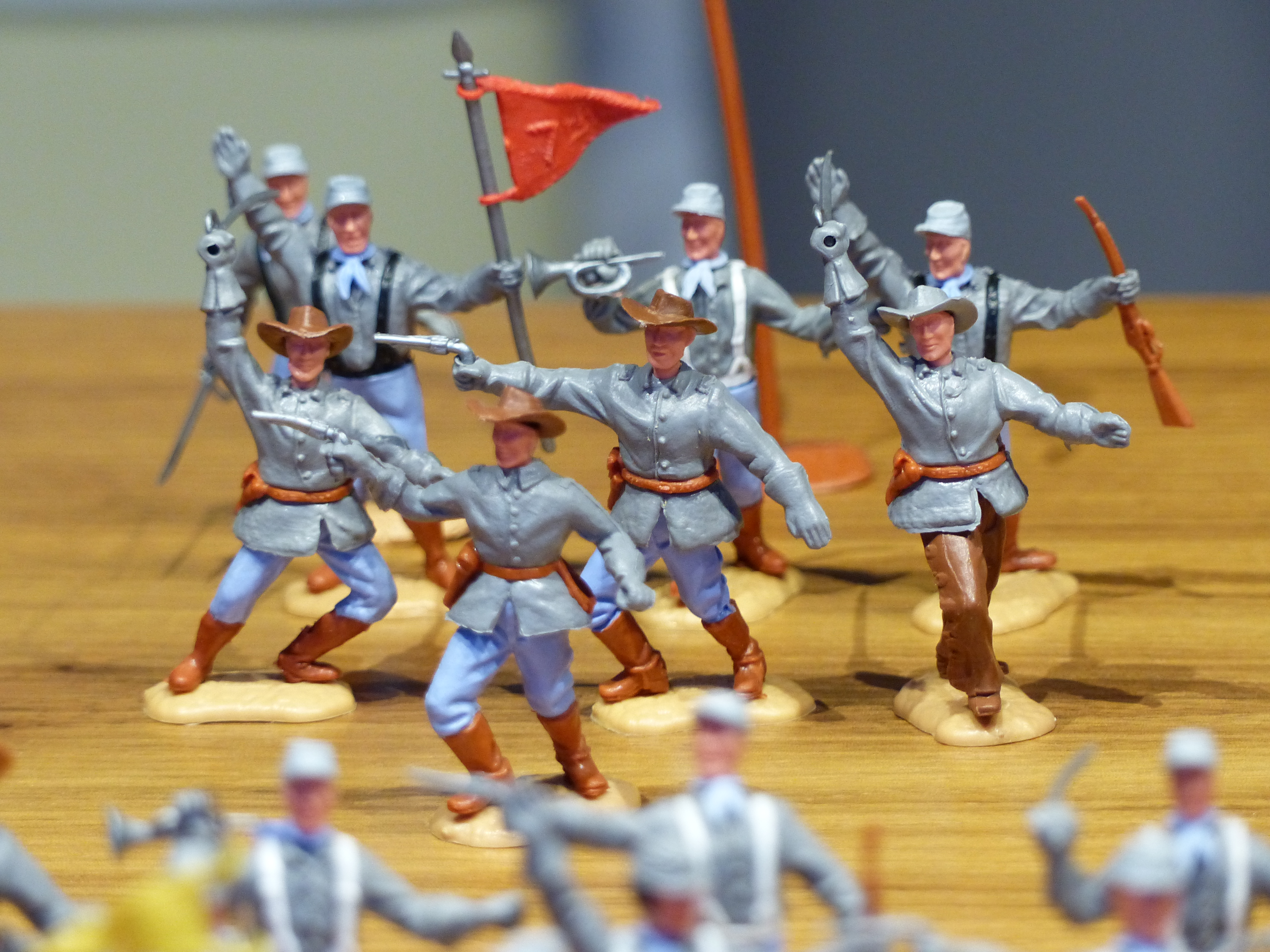
Soldiers of the Confederate States Army

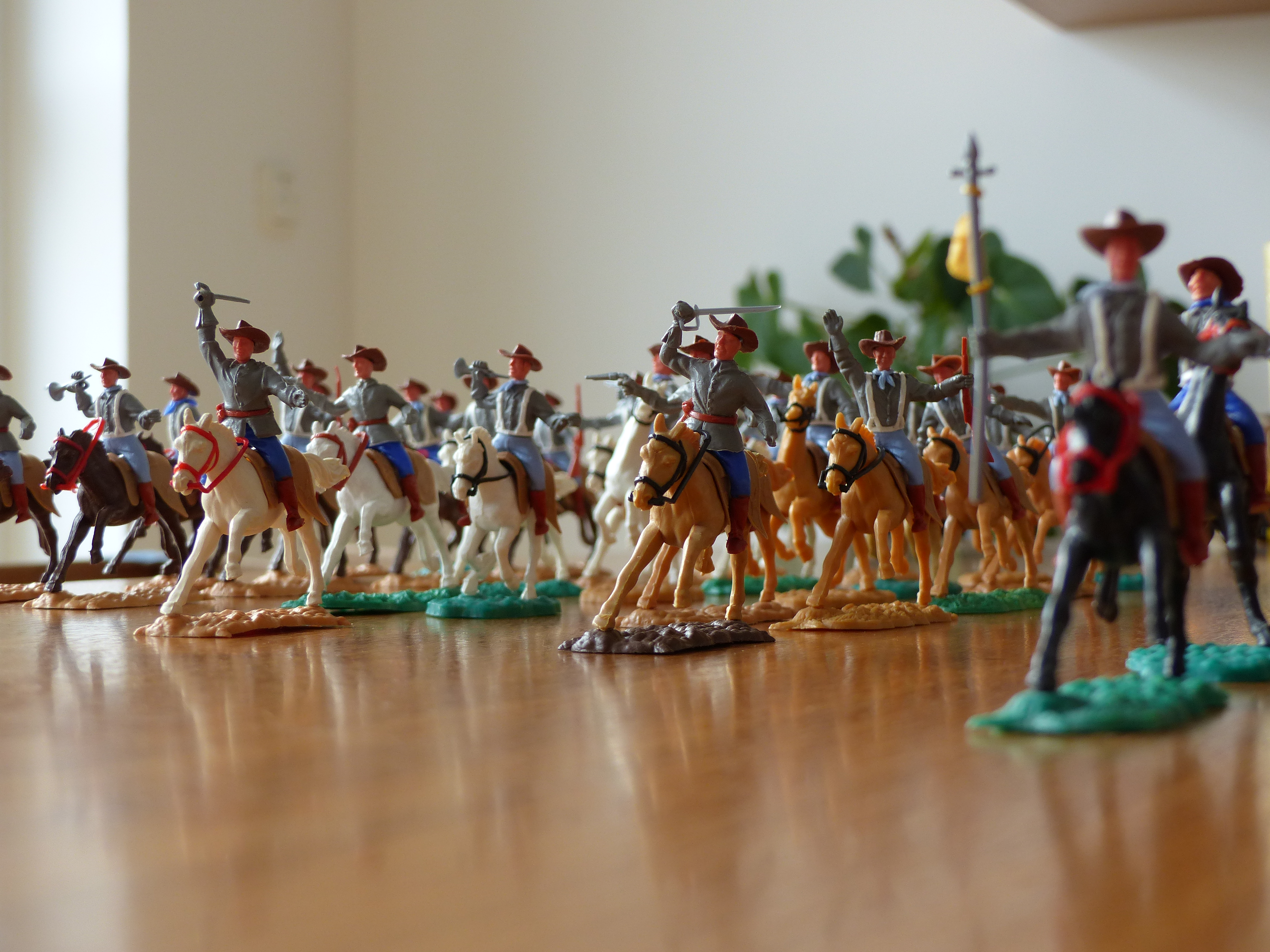
Soldiers of the Confederate States Army

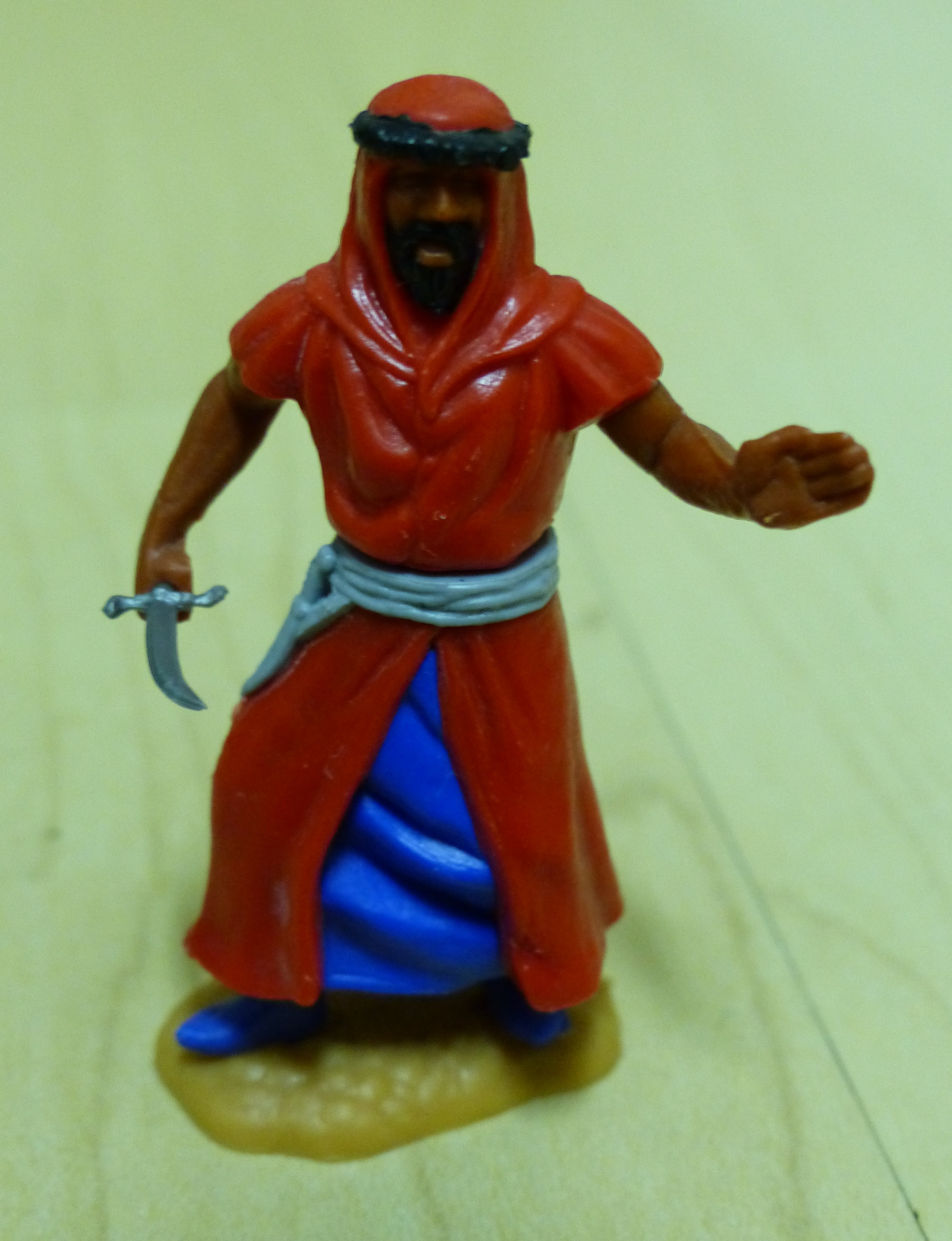
Arab

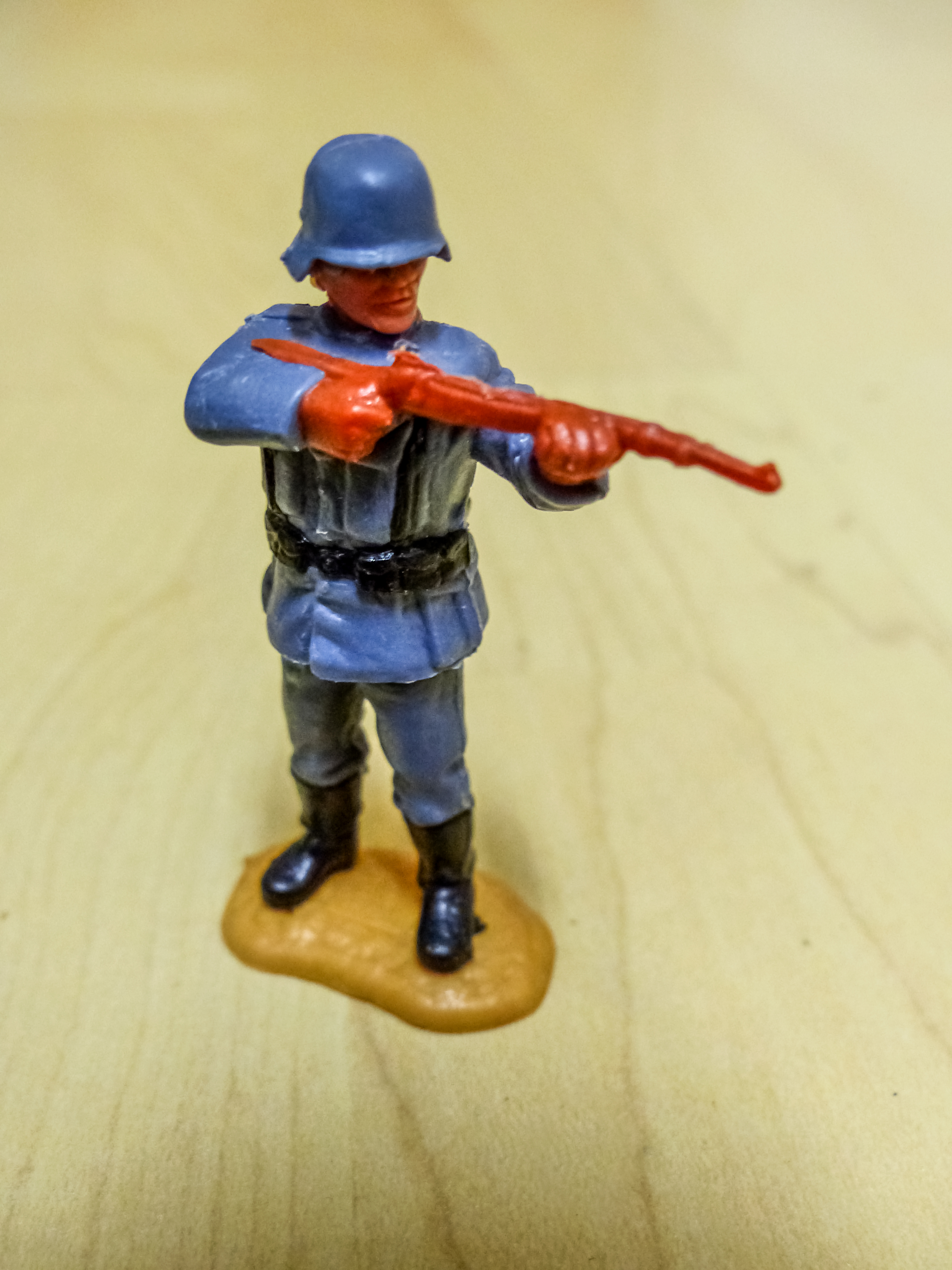
World War II series – German soldier

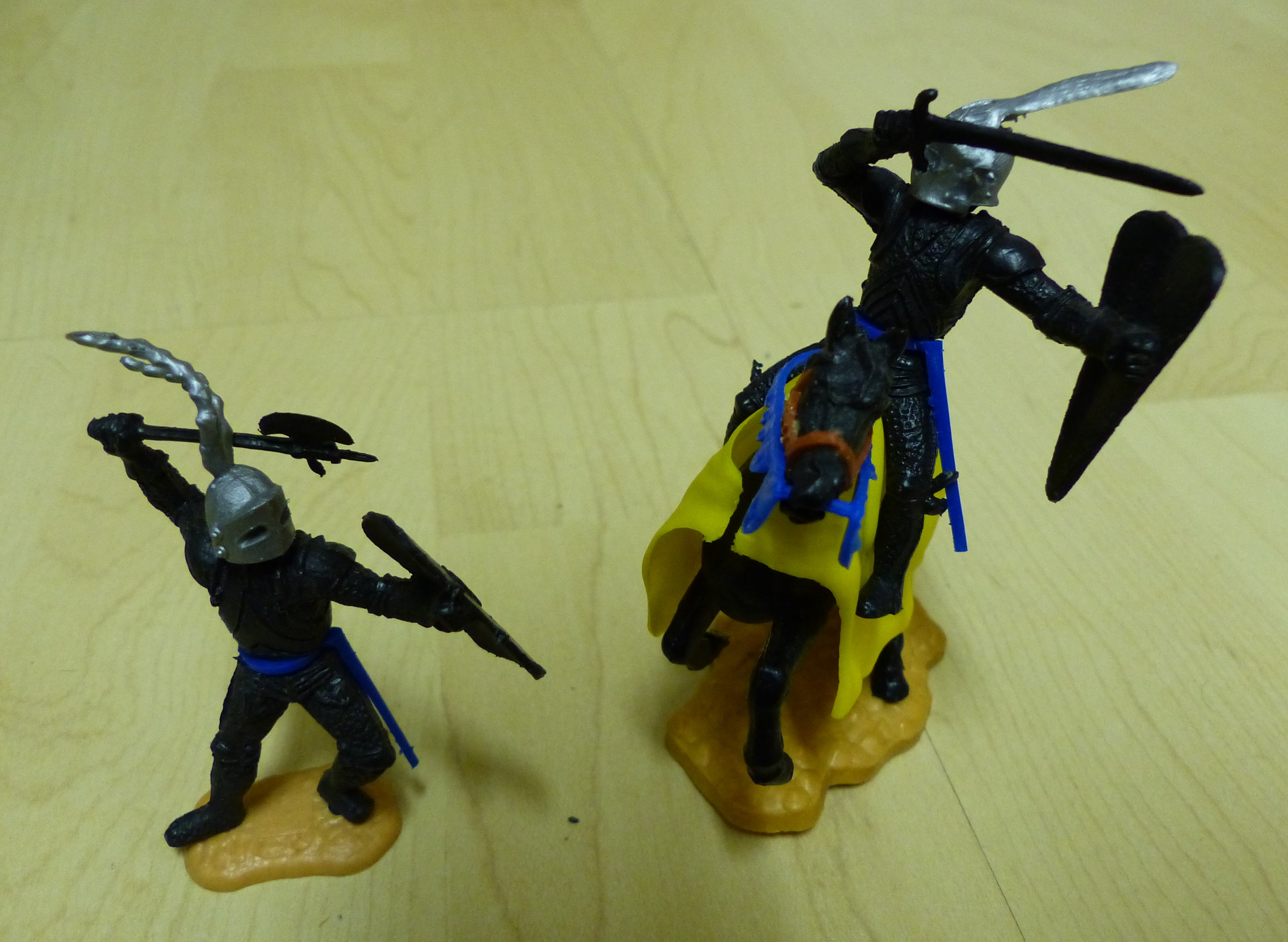
Knight series – Black knights

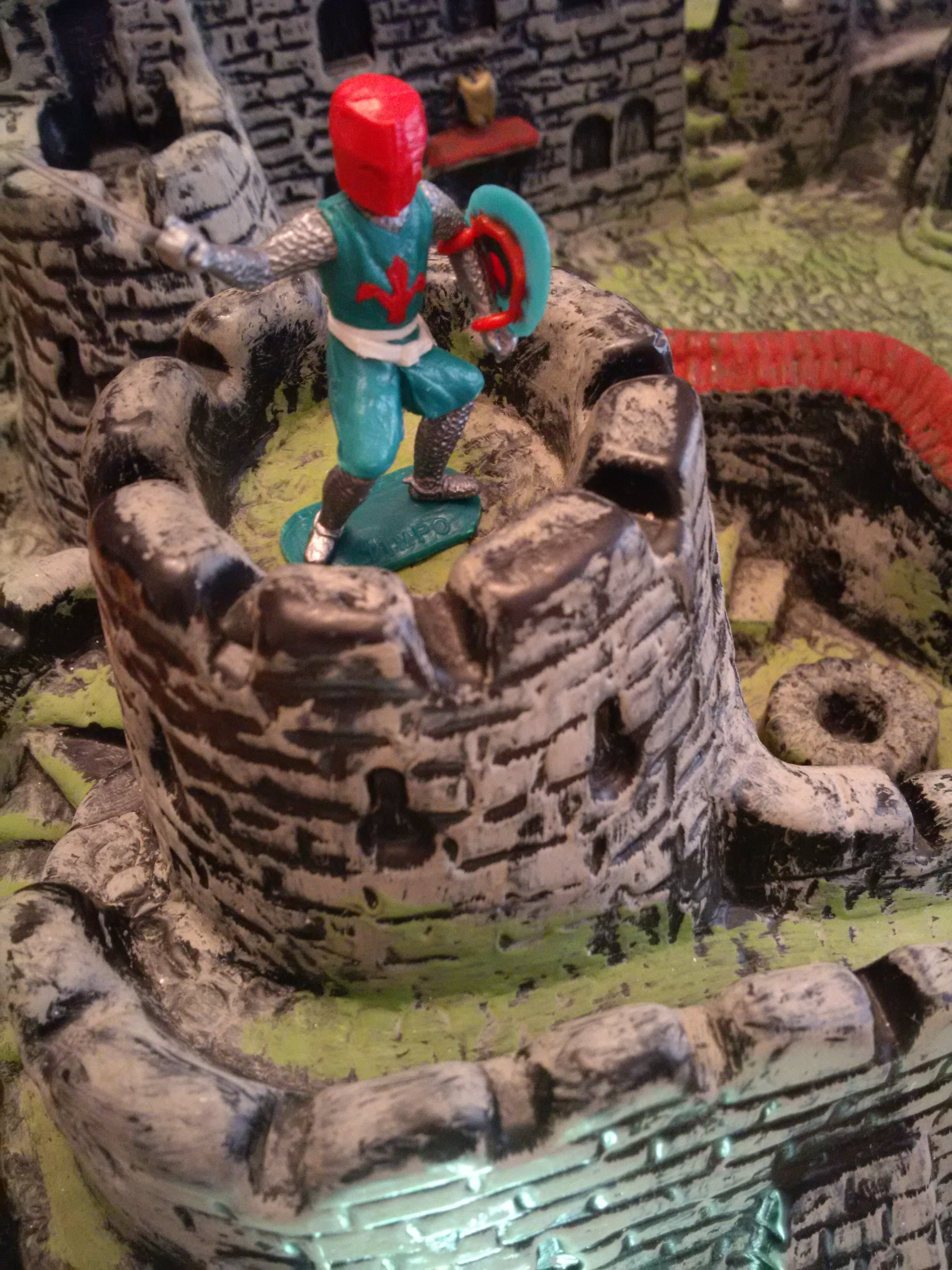
Knight series – Timpo Medieval Knight

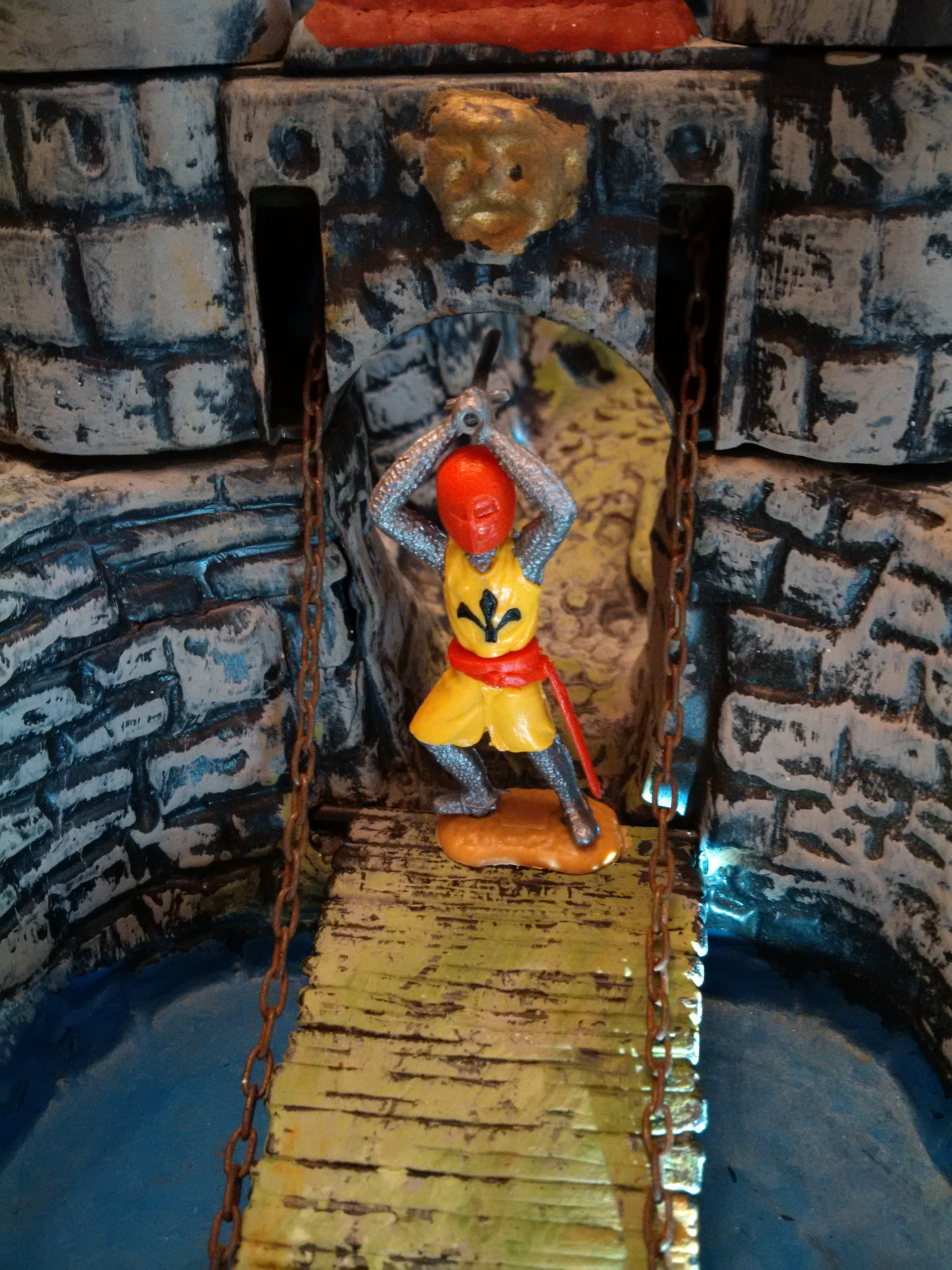
Knight series – Timpo Medieval Knight

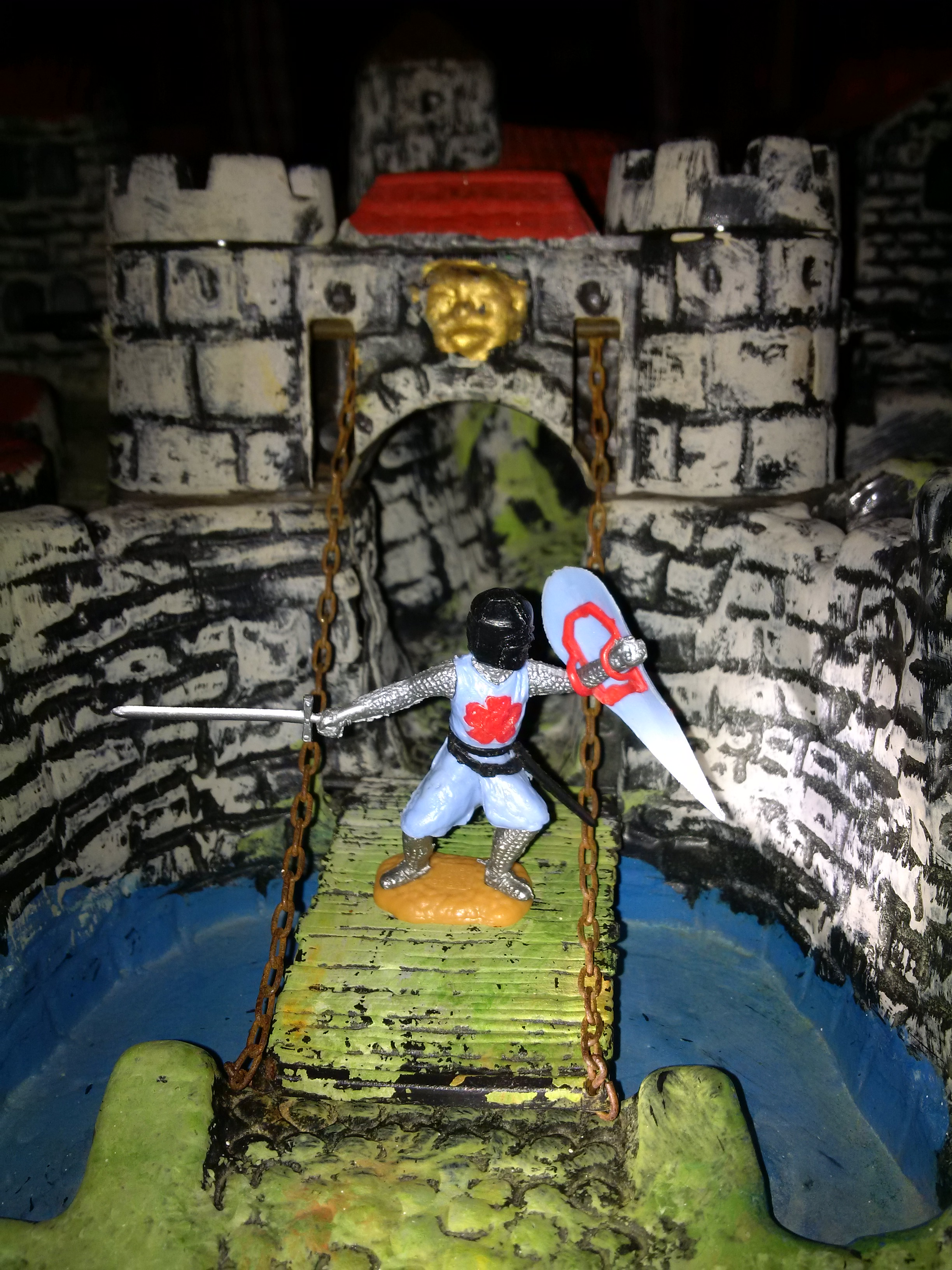
Knight series – Timpo Medieval Knight

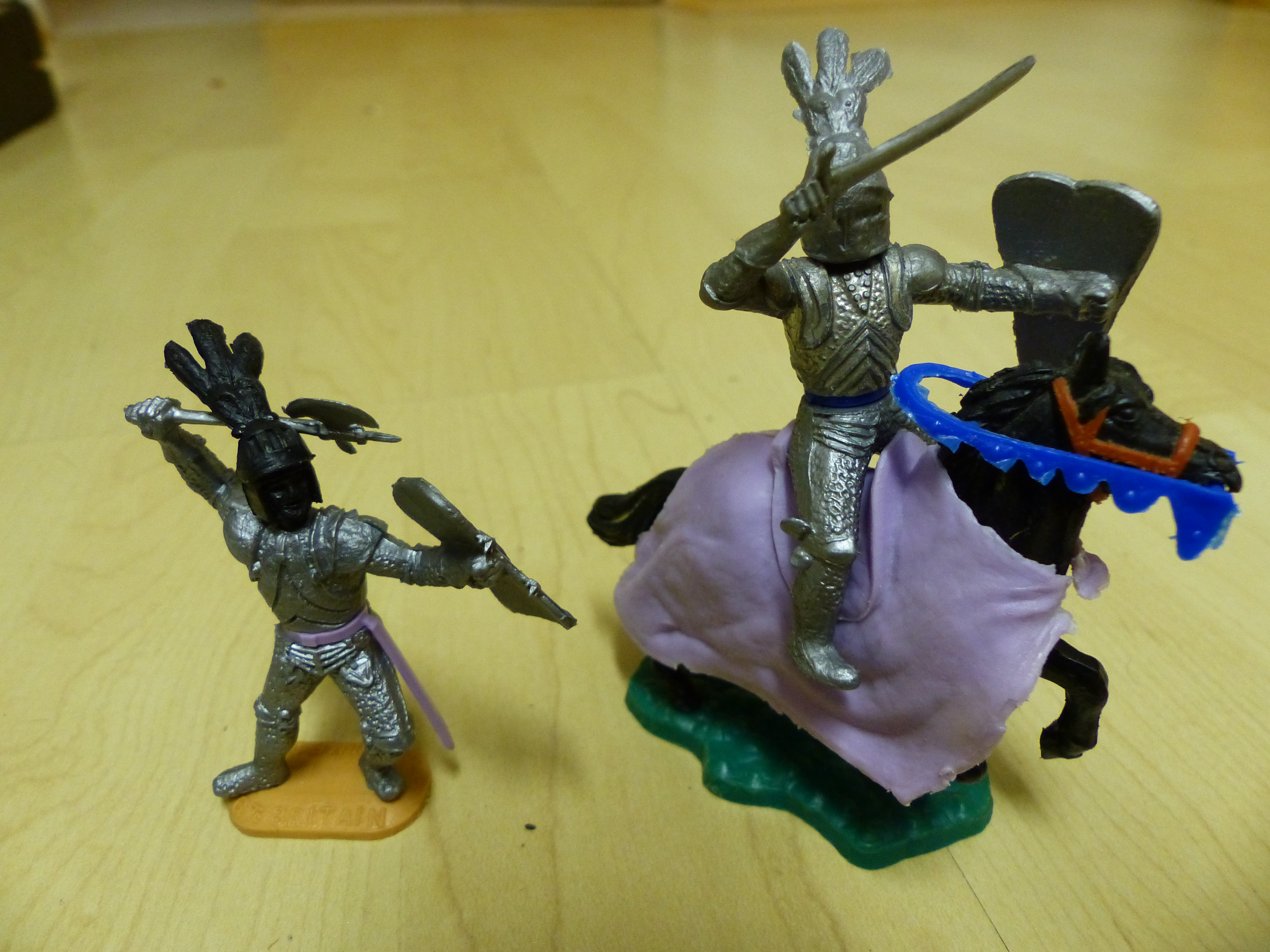
Knight series – Silver Knights

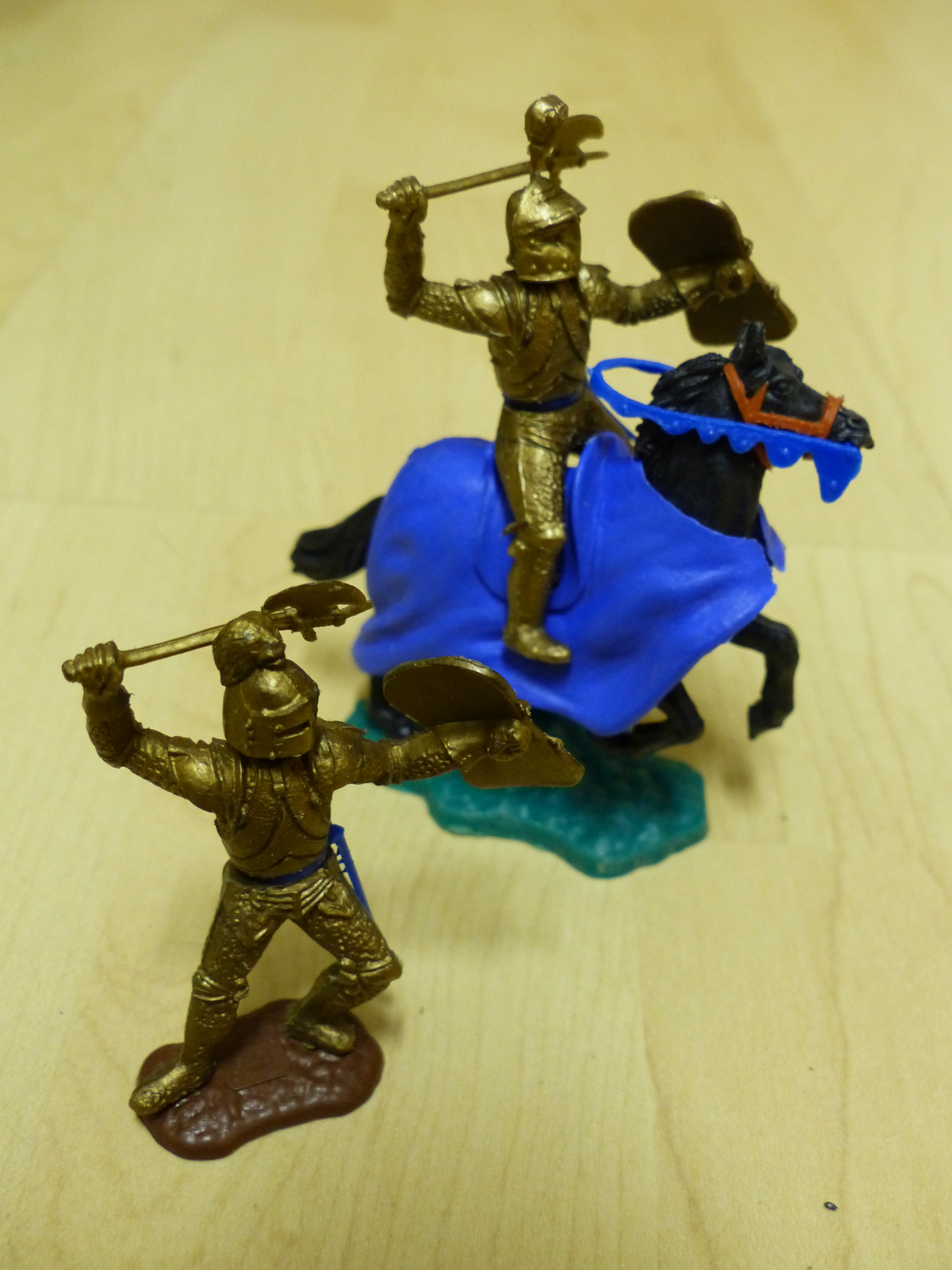
Knight series – Gold Knights

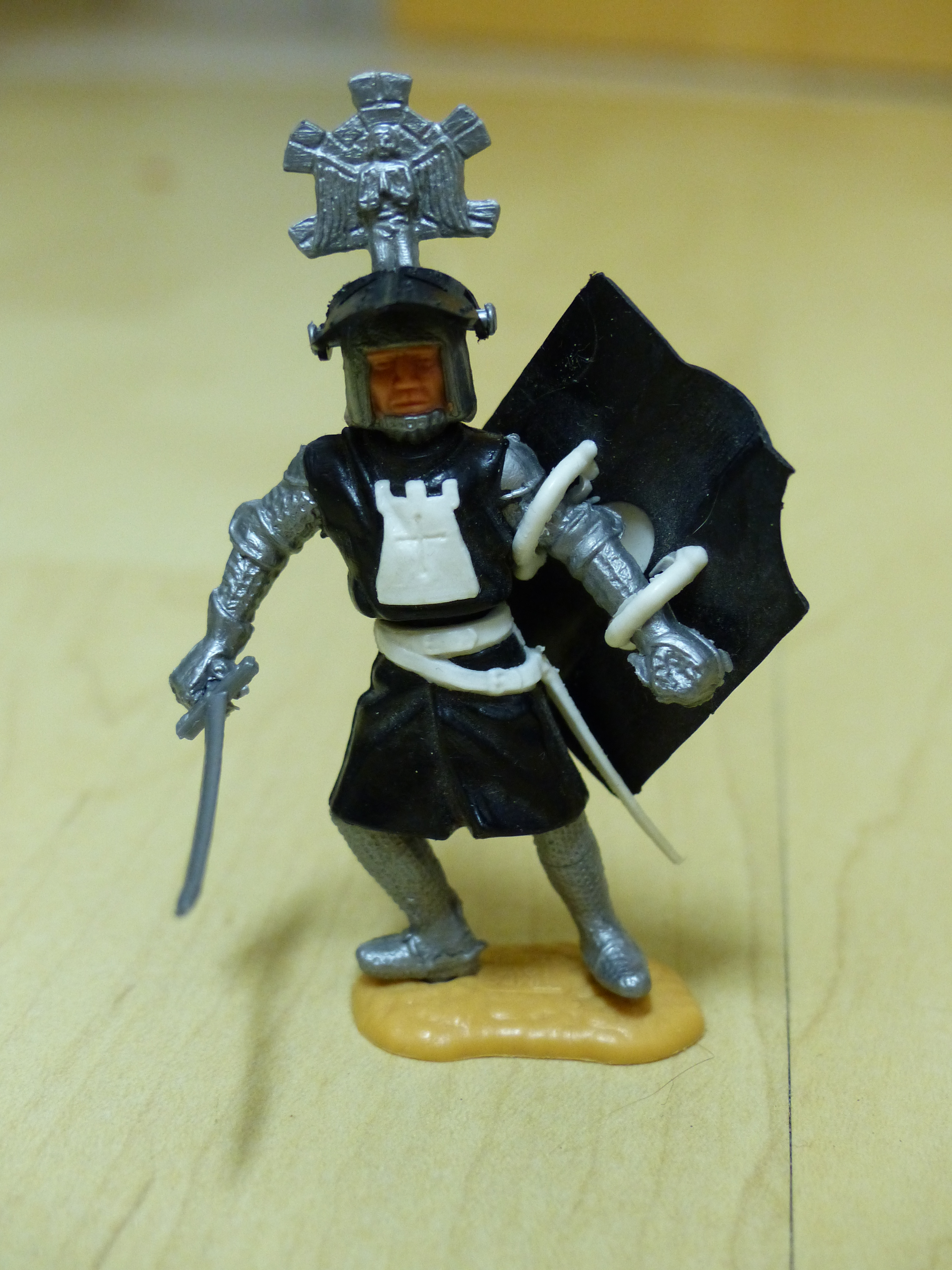
Knight series – Vizor Knight
