= Toy soldier =

Miniature figurine that represents a soldier

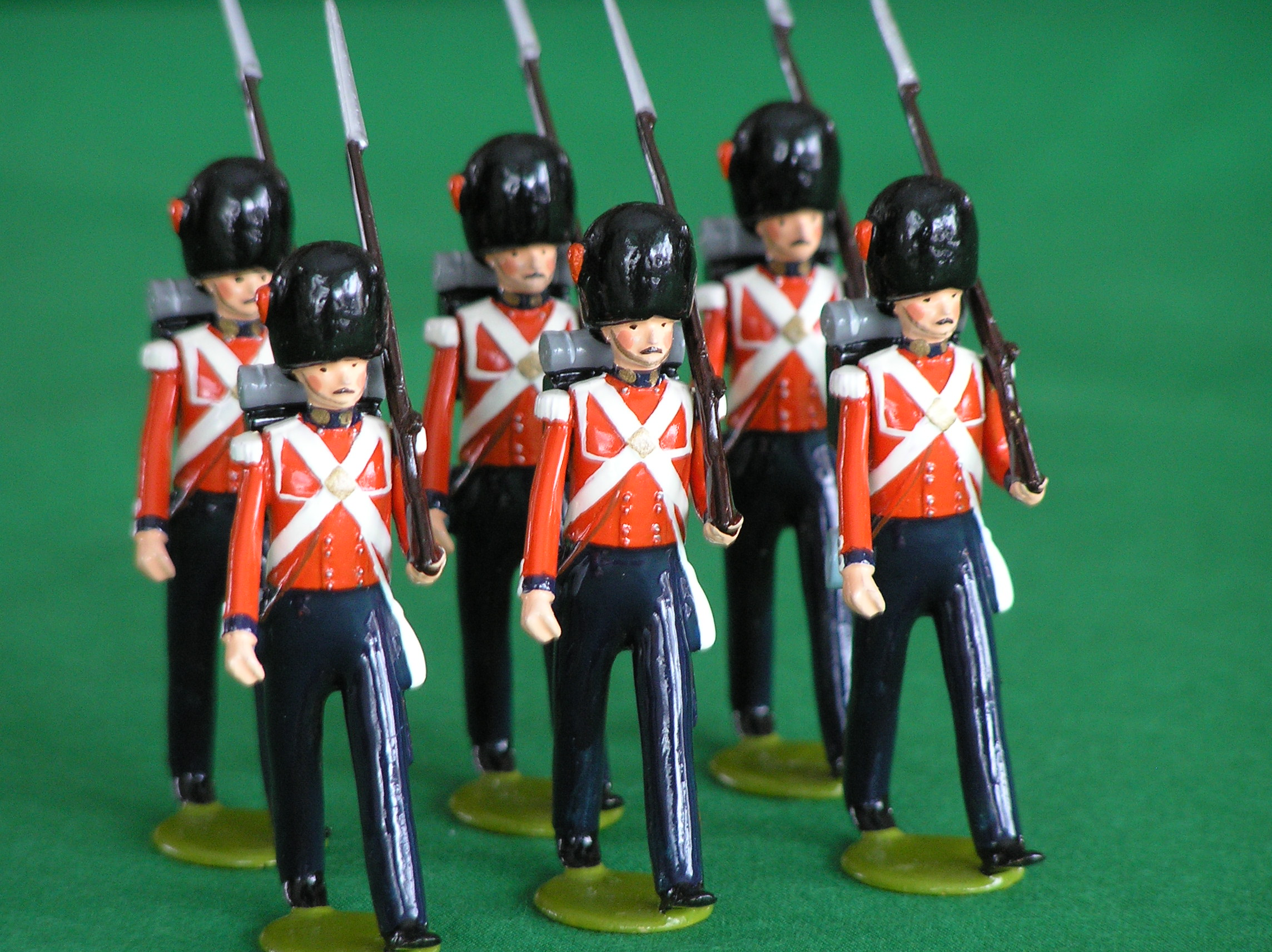
- 54 mm (1:32 scale) toy soldiers by Imperial Productions
- Type: Figurine
- Invented by: Unknown
- Company: Various
- Country: Various
- Availability: 3150 BC–present
- Materials: Various (Note: The primitive toy soldiers from the Ancient Egypt were made of wood, stone, clay, and metal. The mass production modified this and materials turned into plastic, metal, and composite, among others.)
- Features: Soldier

A toy soldier is a miniature figurine that represents a soldier. The term applies to depictions of uniformed military personnel from all eras, and includes knights, cowboys, American Indians, pirates, samurai, and other subjects that involve combat-related themes. Toy soldiers vary from simple playthings to highly realistic and detailed models. The latter are of more recent development and are sometimes called model figures to distinguish them from traditional toy soldiers. Larger scale toys such as dolls and action figures may come in military uniforms, but they are not generally considered toy soldiers.

Toy soldiers are made from all types of material, but the most common mass-produced varieties are metal and plastic. There are many different kinds of toy soldiers, including tin soldiers or flats, hollow-cast metal figures, composition figures, and plastic army men. Metal toy soldiers were traditionally sold in sets; plastic figures were sold in toy shops individually in Britain and Europe and in large boxed sets in the U.S. Modern, collectable figures are often sold individually.

== History ==
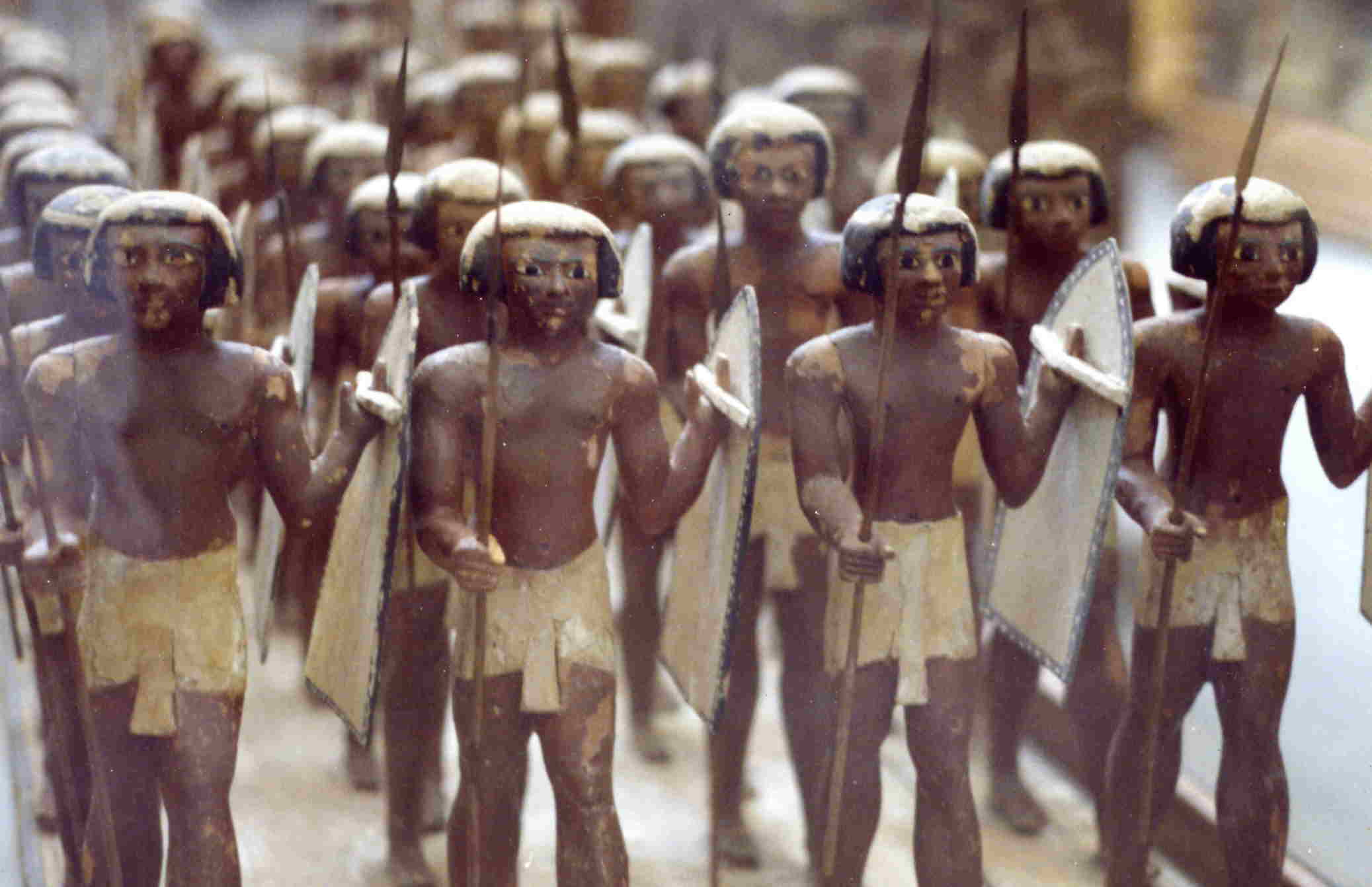
Wooden figures found in the tomb of Mesehti showing Egyptian soldiers of the 11th Dynasty (Egyptian Museum, Cairo)

Throughout the classical period the ancient Egyptians adorned their tombs with miniature chariots, soldiers and figures produced in wood, clay or soft metal with the hope it would provide them with suitable armies in the afterlife. Miniatures of knights on horseback were later used by mediæval noblemen to aid in instruction of jousting. Tin soldiers were produced in Germany as early as the 1730s, by molding the metal between two pieces of slate. Toy soldiers became widespread during the 18th century, inspired by the military exploits of Frederick the Great. Miniature soldiers were also used in the 17th, 18th, and 19th centuries by military strategists to plan battle tactics by using the figures to show the locations of real soldiers. During the French Revolution, model soldiers made from silver produced for the training of the deposed Kings, were melted down for their precious metal to mint new coinage.

In 1893, the British toy company William Britain revolutionized the production of toy soldiers by devising the method of hollow casting, making soldiers that were cheaper and lighter than their German counterparts.

Vintage plastic Trojan War figure by Herald

In addition to Britains, there have been many other manufacturers of toy soldiers over the years. For example, John Hill & Company produced hollow cast lead figures in the same style and scale. Companies such as Elastolin and Lineol were well known for their composite figures made of glue and sawdust that included both military and civilian subjects. After 1950, rising production costs and the development of plastic meant that many shop keepers liked the lighter, cheaper, and far less prone to break in transit polythene figure. This led to greater demand for plastic toy soldiers. The first American plastic soldiers were made by Beton as early as 1937. The first plastic toy soldiers produced in Great Britain were made in 1946 by Airfix before they became known for their famous model kits range.

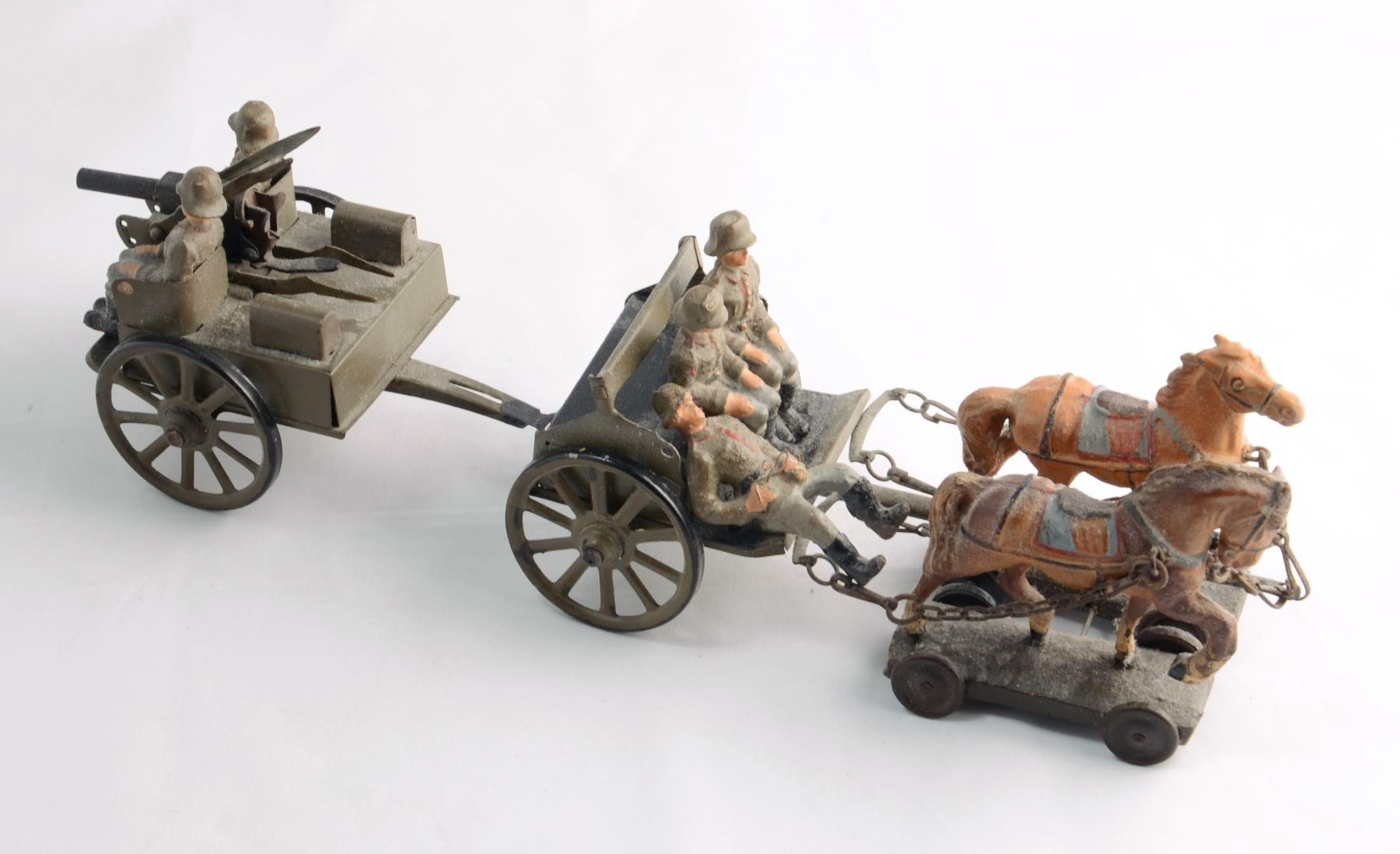
World War I-era toy soldiers

One large historical producer in plastic was Louis Marx and Company, which produced both realistic soldiers of great detail and also historical collections of plastic men and women, including the "Presidents of the United States" collection, "Warriors of the World", "Generals of World War II", "Jesus and the Apostles", and figures from the Coronation of Queen Elizabeth II. Marx also produced boxed playsets that featured many famous battles with armies of two sides, character figures, and terrain features. Britains produced plastic figures under the brand names of Herald and Deetail. Also in England, the scale model company, Airfix produced a variety of high quality plastic sets, which were frequently painted by hobbyists. Many Airfix figures were imitated by other companies and reproduced as inexpensive, bagged plastic army men.

Timpo Toys, Britains main competitor in terms of sales and quality in the 1960s and 70s developed the 'Over - Moulding' system. Different coloured plastics were injected into the mould at various stages, creating a fully coloured figure without the need of paint.

During the 1990s, the production of metal toy-grade painted figures and connoisseur-grade painted toy soldiers increased to serve the demands of the collectors' market. The style of many of these figures shifted from the traditional gloss-coat enamel paint to the matte-finished acrylic paint, which allows for greater detail and historical accuracy. The change was largely inspired by the introduction of very high quality painted figures from St. Petersburg, Russia.

== Collecting ==
There is a substantial hobby devoted to collecting both old and new toy soldiers, with an abundance of small manufacturers, dealers, and toy soldier shows. There are even specialty magazines devoted to the hobby, such as "Toy Soldier Collector", "Plastic Warrior" and "Toy Soldier and Model Figure". Collectors often specialize in a particular type of soldier or historical period, though some people enjoy collecting many different kinds of figures. The most popular historical periods for collecting are the Napoleonic Wars, Victorian era, American Civil War, World War I, and World War II. Many collectors modify and paint plastic figures, and some even cast and paint their own metal figures.

Actor Douglas Fairbanks Jr. had a collection of 3,000 toy soldiers when he sold it in 1977. Fantasy novelist George R. R. Martin has a substantial collection of toy knights and castles. The most extensive collection of toy soldiers was probably that of Malcolm Forbes, who began collecting toy soldiers in the late 1960s and amassed a collection of over 90,000 figures by the time of his death in 1990. Anne Seddon Kinsolving Brown of Providence, Rhode Island, US, began collecting miniature toy soldiers on her honeymoon to Europe in 1930, eventually amassing a collection of over 6,000 figures; these are on display at the Anne S. K. Brown Military Collection at Brown University Library in Providence.

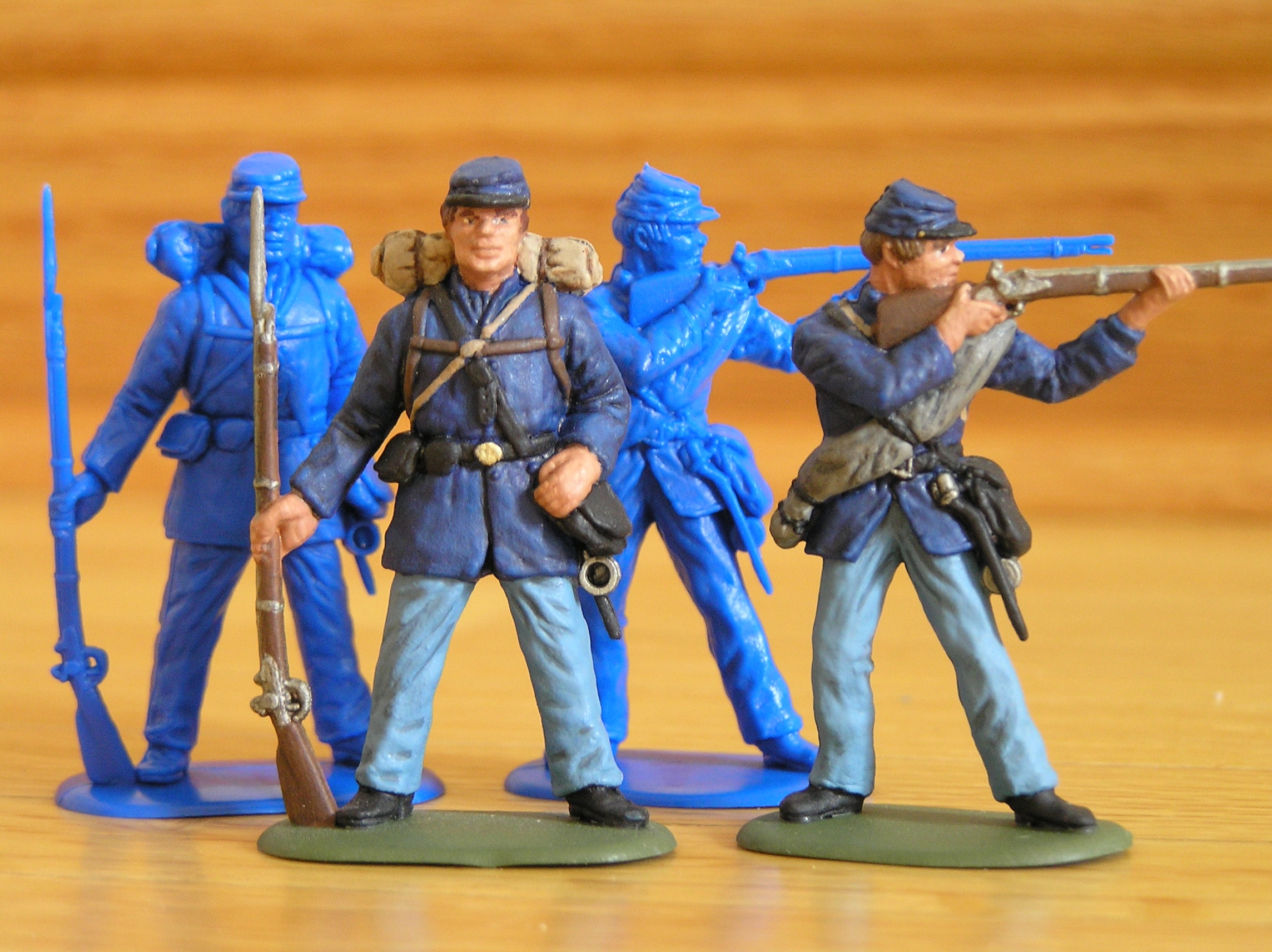
Painted and unpainted American Civil War-era plastic figures by Accurate

In recent years, collectors of vintage toy soldiers made of polythene PE and polypropylene PP thermoplastics as well as PC/ABS plastic blends have reported brittling and disintegration of collectible miniatures or components thereof.

== Varieties ==
Different types and styles of toy soldiers have been produced over the years, depending on the cost and availability of materials, as well as manufacturing technologies. Here is a list of some of the most commonly collected varieties of toy soldiers.

=== Materials ===
- Aluminum – Slush-cast aluminium, made chiefly in France during the early and middle 20th century.
- Paper – Printed on sheets of paper or cardboard, frequently mounted on blocks of wood.
- Plastic – Hard and soft plastic, generally painted figures.
- Solid – Cast in solid metal, usually lead, common in Germany during the 19th and early 20th century.
- Wood - From the 19th century Germany produced large amounts of wooden fortresses and toy soldiers sometimes working on a scissors mechanism.

=== Themes ===
- Army men – Unpainted, soft plastic toy soldiers sold inexpensively in bags or with terrain pieces and vehicles in boxed playsets.
- Composition – Made from a mixture of sawdust and glue, manufactured mostly in Europe, Austria and Germany. Made in the US during WWII metal rationing.
- Connoisseur – High quality, collectible figures featuring highly detailed paint jobs.
- Dimestore – Hollow- or slush-cast iron, sold through five and dime stores from the 1920s to 1960 in the United States.
- Flat – Thin, two-dimensional tin soldiers cast in slate molds.
- Hollow cast – Cast in metal, usually a lead alloy, which cools and sets as it touches the mold; the excess molten metal is poured out leaving a hollow figure.

== Manufacturing methods ==
=== Flat casting ===
Starting in 1730 in Germany, these are one of the oldest and longest produced methods of producing toy soldiers. They consist of millimetre-thick wafers of tin alloy sheet metal that are engraved and painted with images of the characters they represent and are notable for their poseability, being packaged with extra arms and legs that can be removed to allow for far greater flexibility. The simplicity of their production meant that very large sets could be produced very cheaply. Prominent German manufacturers include Allgeyer (1790–1896), Heinrichsen (1830–1945) and Ochel (1925 to present).

=== Solid casting ===
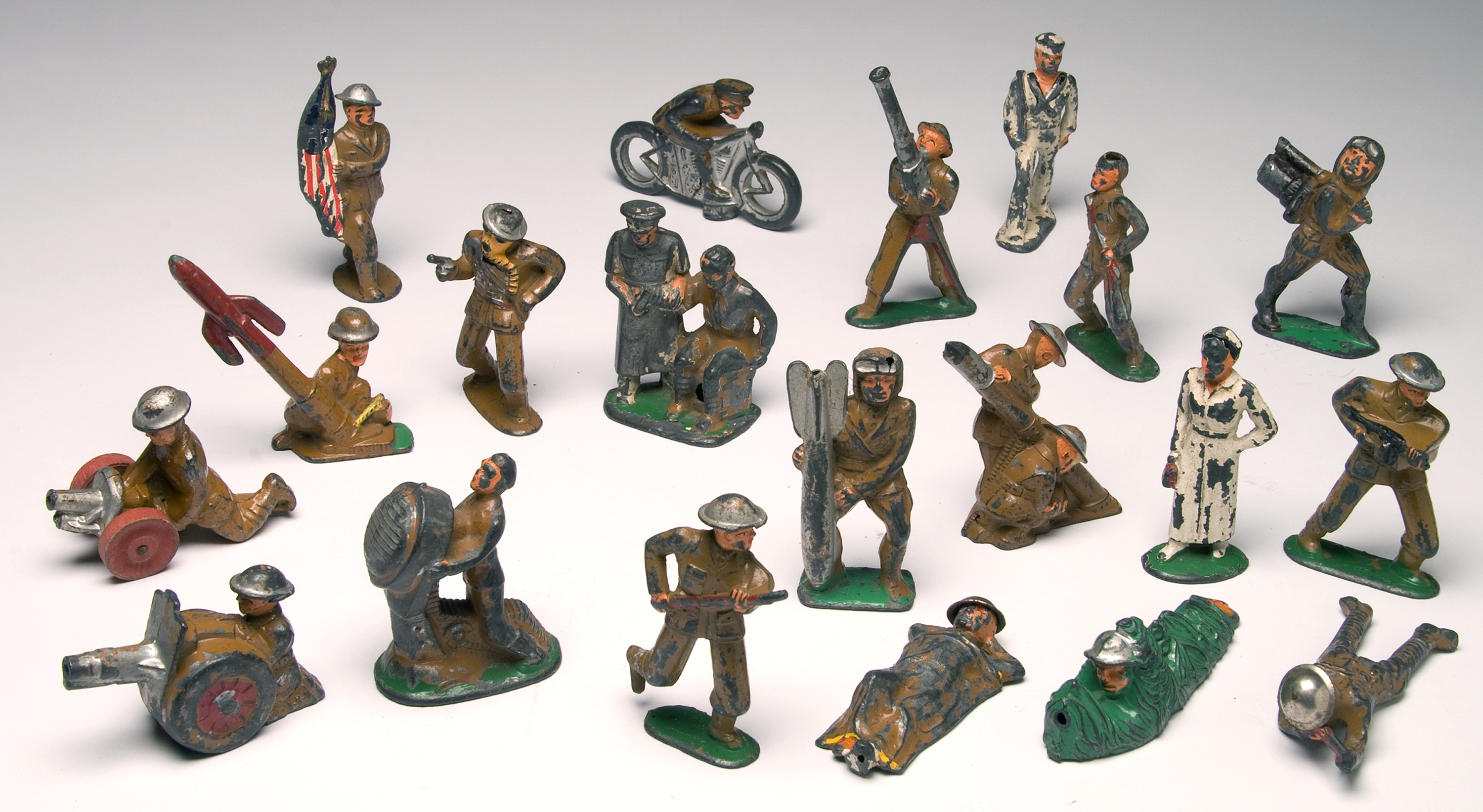
Set of 40 cast metal World War I era toy soldiers, Barclay Manufacturing Company (note aviator carrying bomb site, soldier with trench mortar, and anti-tank gun [wood wheels] are made by Manoil), West Hoboken, New Jersey, ca. 1925

Starting from the mid 19th century, and especially popular in Europe, fully modelled three-dimensional figures are cast in lead creating solid, non-hollow models. These have the advantage over flat casting in that they can be viewed from any angle, however produce the heaviest product. Due to higher manufacturing costs they fell out of favour, however with the use of modern rubber moulds they have come back into fashion and are produced around the world. Prominent manufacturers include Lucotte (France, 1860–1900), Mignot (France, 1890 to present), Heyde (Germany, 1840–1944), Heinrichsen (Germany, 1880–1930), Brigader (Denmark, 1946 to present), Authenticast (Ireland, 1947–1950), Figir (Italy, 1927 to present), MIM (Belgium, 1935–1948) and Alymer (Spain, 1928 to present).

== Makers ==
Prominent vintage toy soldier makers include Airfix, Barclay, Britains, Herald, Elastolin, Imperial, John Hill & Company, Lineol, Marx, Manoil, Reamsa and Timpo.

== Gaming ==
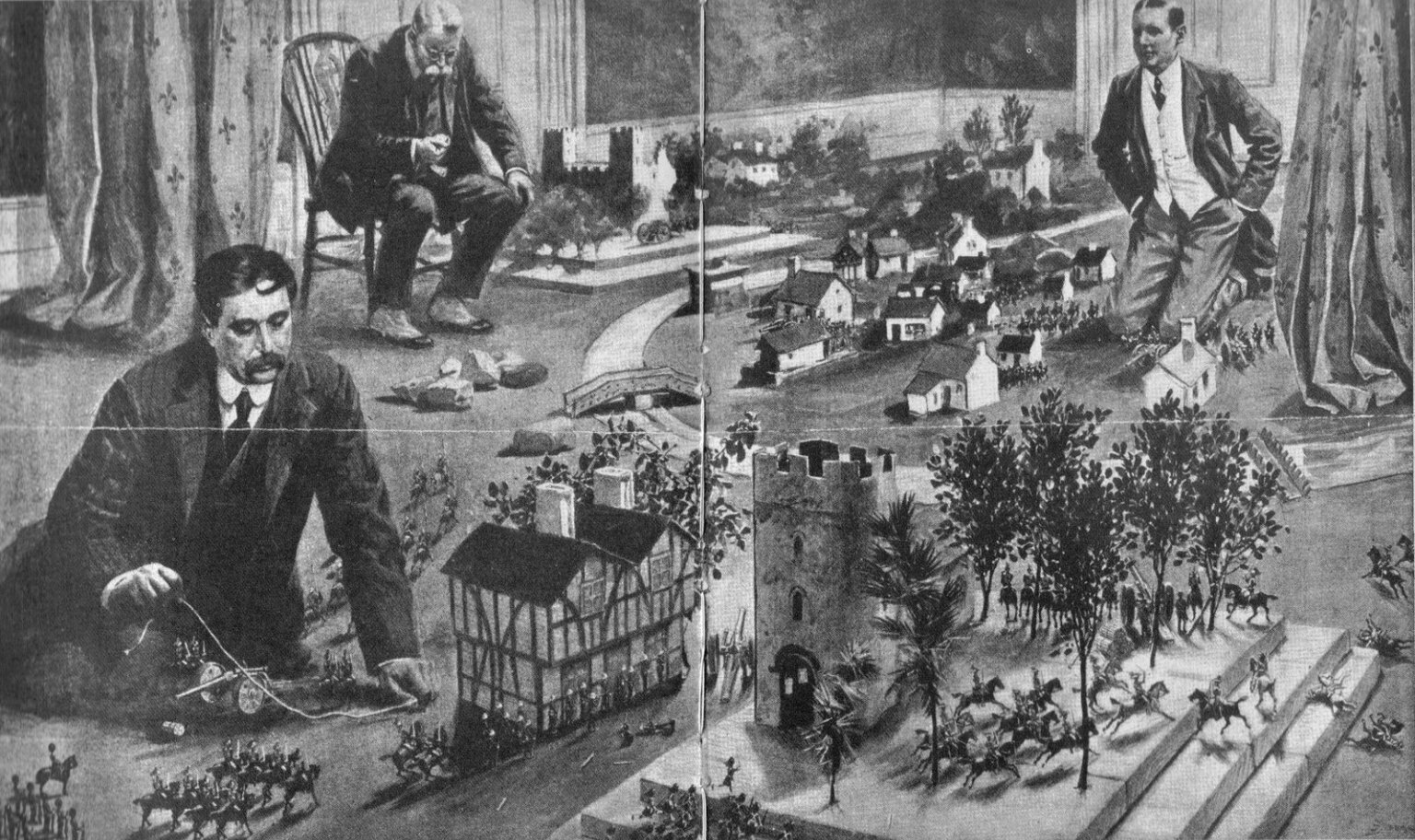
H. G. Wells playing a wargame with toy soldiers, 1913

The playing of wargames with toy figures was pioneered by H. G. Wells in his 1913 book, Little Wars. Wells, a pacifist, was the first to publish detailed rules for playing war games with toy soldiers. He suggested that this could provide a cathartic experience, possibly preventing future real wars. Although this was not to be, Little Wars was a predecessor to the modern hobby of miniatures wargaming. According to Wells, the idea of the game developed from a visit by his friend Jerome K. Jerome. After dinner, Jerome began shooting down toy soldiers with a toy cannon and Wells joined in to compete.

A similar book titled Shambattle: How to Play with Toy Soldiers was published by Harry Dowdall and Joseph Gleason in 1929.

Although people continue to play wargames with miniature figures, most contemporary wargamers use a smaller scale than that favored by collectors, typically under 25 mm.

== Scale ==
Scale for toy soldiers is expressed as the soldier's approximate height from head to foot in millimeters. Because many figures do not stand up straight, height is usually an approximation. Standard toy soldier scale, originally adopted by W. Britain, is 54 mm (2.25 inches) or 1:32 scale. Among different manufacturers, standard scale may range from 50 mm or 1:35 scale, to 60 mm or 1:28 scale. For gamers and miniatures enthusiasts, 25 mm and even smaller scales are available. On the larger end of the scale are American dimestore figures, and many of the toy soldiers produced in Germany, which are approximately 75 mm (3 inches) or 1:24 scale.

Ratio	Length per foot	Height	Examples
1:35	0.342" [8.68 mm]	1.811" [46 mm]	Popular military modelling scale for vehicles and light aircraft (Tamiya). Also used for the accompanying human display models like crew and passengers.
1:32	0.375" [9.525 mm]	1.98" [50.3 mm]	Model railroad "I scale". Also used for display models. Britains toy farm sets (animals, structures, and most vehicles) and "Stablemate size" model horses were in this scale.
1:30	0.4" [10.16 mm]	2.125" [54 mm] 2.165" [55 mm]	Traditional "Normal scale" lead or die-cast metal toy soldiers (Britains).
1:28	0.423" [10.87 mm]	2.36" [60 mm]	Spanish 60 mm size (actually closer to 1/26 or 1/27 scale) (Alymer Toy Soldiers).
1:24	0.50" [12.7 mm]	3" [76.2 mm]	American "dimestore" 3-inch size (Barclay or Manoil) or German 75 mm size (actually closer to 1/21 scale). 1/2-scale dollhouses are built in this scale.
1:16	0.75" [19.05 mm]	4" [101.6 mm]	Used for Ertl's toy farm sets (animals, structures, and most vehicles) and most plastic toy animal figures.

== In popular culture ==
In the 1972 short story "Battleground" by Stephen King, a group of toy soldiers target a professional hit-man.

Toy soldiers go to war in the 1998 film Small Soldiers.

== See also ==
- Army men
- Dimestore soldier
- Tin soldier
- Britains Deetail
- Miniature wargaming
- Model figure

== Bibliography ==
- Opie, James (1983). Toy Soldiers (1st ed.). Princes Risborough: Shire Albums. ISBN 9780852636329.
