= Chicago Toy Soldier Show =

Trade show in Schaumburg, Illinois, US

Coordinates: 42.0521°N 88.0336°W

- Genre: Trade show
- Frequency: Annually
- Venue: Schaumburg Marriott
- Location: Schaumburg, Illinois
- Country: USA
- Inaugurated: 1980
- Next event: September 20, 2026
- Organiser: CTSS, Inc.
- Website: chicagotoysoldiershow.com

The Chicago Toy Soldier Show is a toy soldier and model figure trade show. It is held annually in the Chicago suburb of Schaumburg, Illinois. The weekend event features 350 tables of toy soldiers and related collectibles. In 2005, the show attracted a crowd of 1,800 from all over the United States as well as other countries. It is one of the oldest and largest toy soldier shows in North America.

== History ==
The show was organized by OTSN, Inc., publisher of Old Toy Soldier News. It became known as the Old Toy Soldier Show or simply, the OTSN Show.

In 2016, one of the original founders of OTSN purchased the show from the other partners. CTSS, Inc. began organizing the show.

The show was held at the Hyatt Regency Hotel near Woodfield Mall, in the Chicago suburb of Schaumburg, Illinois. Due to complications during contract negotiations, the relationship with Hyatt was terminated in January 2023.

In 2023, Matthew Murphy of Hobby Bunker took over organization of the show. The name changed to Chicagoland Toy Soldier Show.

=== Event dates ===
- The Chicago Toy Soldier Show continues to be held annually. The 2026 event is scheduled for September 20, 2026, at the Schaumburg Marriott in Schaumburg, Illinois.

The Chicago Toy Soldier Show continues to be held annually. The 2026 event was scheduled for September 20, 2026, at the Schaumburg Marriott in Schaumburg, Illinois.

== See also ==
- Toy soldier
- Tin soldier
- Model figure
- Army men
- Dimestore soldiers
