= Steelfab =

Former Wales-based engineering firm

Steelfab was a Cardiff, Wales-based engineering firm that built the "Steelfab Digger", a competitor to the HyMac and JCB excavators in the 1960s. The company also built the Horndraulic brand of front loaders for fitting to agricultural tractors.

== Background ==
Steel Fabricators Limited was founded in Birmingham in 1935 to manufacture pressed and sheet metal work. During the 1939 to 1945 period the company was solely engaged on government contracts, and the factory occupied an area of 5,000 square feet (460 m^{2}), and there were some 50 employees. In 1946, to meet expansion plans, the company relocated to Pengam Road, Cardiff and won large contracts, including supplying the frames for the BISF house project and Rigid Form beams for the then Ministry of Works.

== History ==
In the early 1950s, Steelfab entered the backhoe loader market, which resulted in the introduction of the "Scout" Digger, manufactured under license to the Shawnee Manufacturing Company of the US. Many hundreds of "Scout" diggers were sold, but the unit did have its limitations and the "Shawnee Warrior" digger was designed to supersede the Scout. In 1952 a subsidiary company was formed in Australia and this Company had a modern plant on the Moorabbin Industrial Estate near Melbourne, Victoria. In 1954, a license was finalized with the Shawnee Company, U.S.A., to manufacture and market "Shawnee" industrial loaders and diggers and those products formed a major part of the Company's range. In 1958, a license agreement was made with H.G. Poole Limited to manufacture and market Shawnee Poole Rear Dump Haulers, which enjoyed considerable success throughout the world and were leaders in the articulated dumper field.

In 1959, Steel Fabricators (Cardiff) Ltd., was taken over by the Adamant & Western Group and became a member of the Adwest Group. Later that year Steelfab, carried out a market survey with a view to introducing a combination unit as opposed to the Shawnee Warrior type attachment digger. The Steelfab project started in 1960 and the Unit was designed to fall between the JCB 4 and Massey Ferguson backhoe loaders models. Several hundred 160/180 combinations units were built but the early models were built on the light weight Fordson Dexta skid unit which was not strong enough to carry the stresses produced by a backhoe loader and units started to fail. This proved futile in the success of the product and although the larger International Harvester B2275 skid was introduced as a replacement it was too late for its reputation.

A larger 170/180 model was launched in the late 1960s with a much stronger and more powerful Ford 5000 skid, but sales were limited and only around 60 units were sold and production ceased circa 1972. The Horndraulic '800' digger was first produced during the latter part of 1965 and received considerable acceptance on the market and a larger 900 was later produced. This machine mounted on the rear of tractors. The 800 diggers used the tractor hydraulics to power the digger although a pump system powered by the tractor power take-off (PTO) was offered as an option.

The 900 digger incorporated a pump system run from the tractor PTO as part of its design. Steelfab also manufactured front end loaders for fitment to many different tractor marques and models under the brand name "Horndraulic" originally under license from the US. For some time Steelfab manufactured front end loaders for Ford and Leyland tractor which were marketed under the Ford and Leyland brand names by their dealers. The designer of the 800 and 900 digger who had joined Steelfab from the HyMac company later went on to design a scissor design tipper trailer known as the Power X System and later left Steelfab and set up business building mini excavators known as Powerfab.

The Steelfab SF 122 loader was used to build the "Roadless 700" Tractor loader in 1968. This machine based on the Roadless Plougemaster 65 and 75 tractors. Six were supplied to Israel between 1969 and 1972. The original prototype is believed to be the only one in existence. These were unusual machines as they had a Brockhouse torque converter transmission but were based on a Ford tractor.

=== Competition ===
At this time, the market was very competitive with several firms offering alternatives to the JCB excavators. HyMac Limited later took over Whitlock Bros. of Great Yeldham in Essex Manufacturing The HyMac 370 backhoe loader range.

== See also ==
- J. C. Bamford

== Sources ==
- Classic Construction Plant & Machinery, published by Alan T. Condie publications. 1995; ISSN 1358-3395
