= Bergen Toy & Novelty Company =

American Toy Company

The Bergen Toy & Novelty Company (Beton for short) was an American toy manufacturer based in Carlstadt, New Jersey. The company began in 1932 as Marcak Toy & Novelty Company and became the Bergen Toy & Novelty Company in 1936. The company was founded by Charles Marcak and his wife Elsie. It was named after the county in New Jersey in which it was located.

Beton originally produced hollow cast lead toys but switched to cellulose acetate in 1938. This decision made the company the first producer of plastic military figures commonly known as army men. Beton toys were popular through the 1950s, but the company stopped production in 1958 due to increased competition from less expensive foreign companies.

== Varieties ==
Beton primarily made hard plastic figurines sold as boxed sets or as individual figures displayed on spinners in dimestores, grocery stores, and drug stores. They sold toy soldiers, cowboys and Indians, firemen, policemen, farmers, railroad workers, townspeople, zoo animals, and circus performers. Their figures were often attached to a separately molded plastic base, marked "Beton" and "Made in USA" on the bottom. Later figures were molded as a single piece, with the base incorporated. The faces and some of the clothing on the figures were hand painted.

During the 1940s, Beton cowboys and Indians were packaged with Lincoln Logs, replacing the smaller lead figures that were previously included.

== See also ==
- Dimestore soldiers
- List of toys
