= Roy Selwyn-Smith =

English sculptor (1923–2006)

Roy Selwyn-Smith (22 September 1923 in Walton-on-Thames – 16 June 2006), was an English sculptor of plastic figures and toy soldiers.

== Career ==
Following World War II service as a merchant navy radio operator in the North Atlantic, Selwyn-Smith joined Myer Zang's Modern Packages where he learned sculpting and plastic moulding from 1947 to 1949. He then joined Willmore & Sons that made moulds for lead hollow-cast figures for Timpo.

Selwyn-Smith used his wife, Mary, as a model for a figure of a woman leaning against her suitcase.

In 1951, Selwyn-Smith formed Selwyn until his backer committed suicide and the moulds were sold to W. Britain.

Returning to Zang, he developed the Herald Miniatures plastic figures with Zang that W. Britain distributed from 1954 until the firm was purchased by W. Britain in 1959. Selwyn-Smith also developed W. Britain's Swoppets where figures could be assembled and combined with pieces of different coloured plastic to form a variety of poses that was patented in 1956.
