= Dimestore soldier =

Toy soldiers sold in five and dime stores

Dimestore soldier is a name first given by collector and author Don Pielin to American-made toy soldiers sold individually in five and dime stores from the 1930s to the 1950s before being replaced by plastic toy soldiers called army men. Though most figures were hollowcast metal, composition and plastic dimestore figures were also made. The popularity of the toy soldier reflected public interest in wars around the world and America's own military preparedness of the era. The largest dimestore companies are: Barclay, Manoil, Grey Iron, and Auburn.

== Rise and fall ==
As opposed to the standard 54mm size popularised by Britains figures, the minimally painted dimestore figures were 3 inches/7 cm in size to correspond with the American made standard gauge toy trains of the time. Though they had made smaller sized figures previously, Barclay began their 3 inch size in 1924 with the figures made of 87% lead and 13% antimony.

The largest manufacturer of toy soldiers in the United States in the 1930s and early 1940s was the Barclay Manufacturing Company. Prices of the soldiers were mostly kept to five cents, a nickel during this time, making them affordable to children. Other manufacturers made similar figures in mostly comparable sizes. The soldier's uniforms changed with military fashion, going from high collar to open collar and from puttees to leggings.

In 1942 lead toy production ceased with American toy soldiers being manufactured in composition, plastic and paper. Production resumed in 1945 with moulds reconfigured to the M1 Helmet but prices rose to 10 and later 15 cents. In the early 1950s, Barclay conserved metal by designing new figures with a large "pod foot" instead of the usual base. However, the low cost of mass amounts of unpainted plastic figures, the increasing cost of the price of metal and scares of the dangers of metal toys lead to the demise of the dimestore soldier.

Barclay's biggest rival the Manoil Manufacturing Co. went out of business in 1959. Barclay ceased production in 1971.
