= Barclay Manufacturing Company =

American toy manufacturer

- Industry: Toy manufacturing
- Founded: 1922
- Founder: Leon Donze; Michael Levy
- Headquarters: New Jersey
- Website: barclaycompany.com

The Barclay Manufacturing Company was an American metal toy company based in New Jersey that specialized in diecast toy cars and hollowcast toy soldiers. Due to their common availability at five-and-dime stores, collectors often refer to Barclay's toy soldiers as "Dimestore soldiers".

== History ==
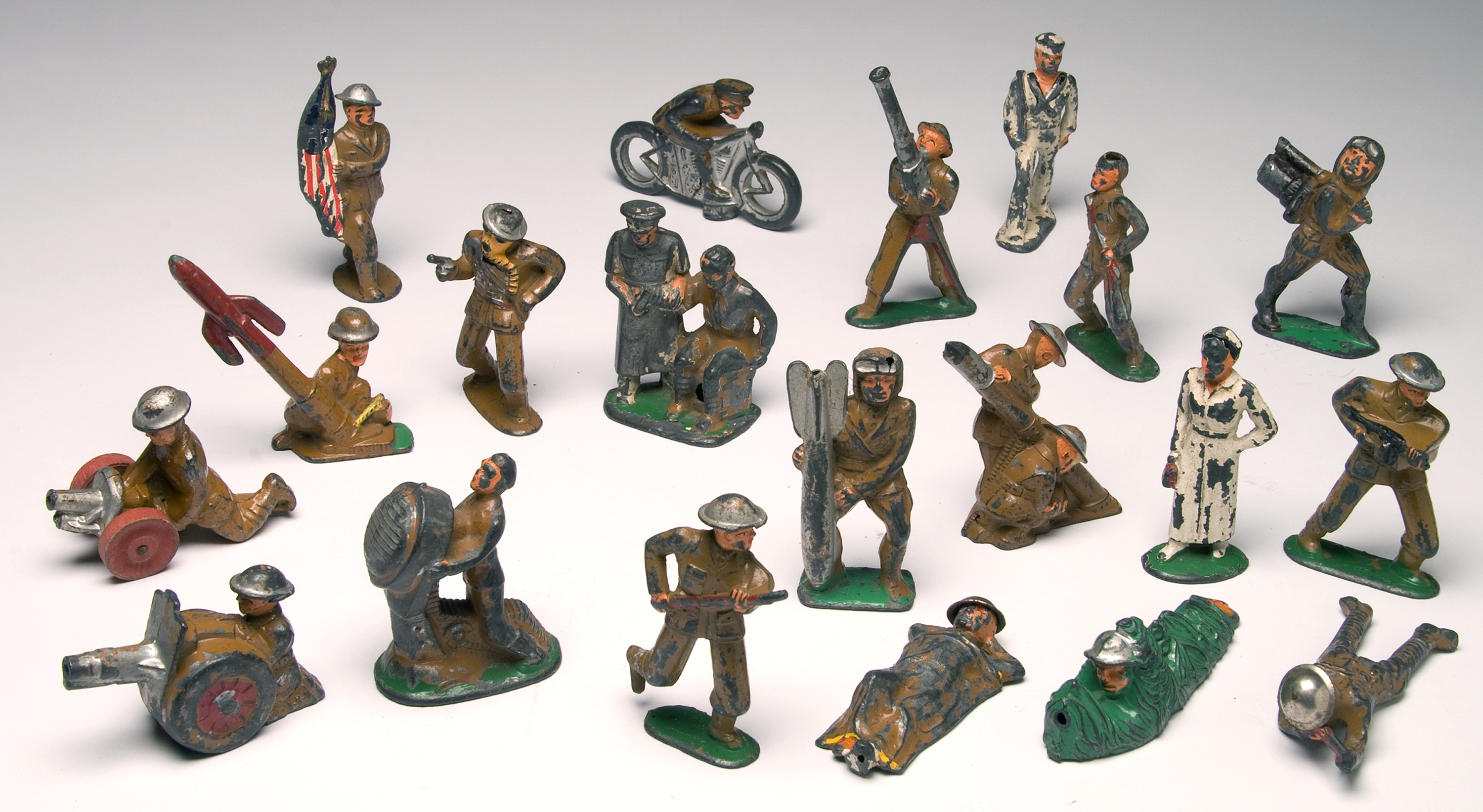
Barclay and Manoil lead toy soldiers and figures, including motorcycle, canons and mortars.

Barclay Manufacturing was formed by Leon Donze and Michael Levy in about 1922.. The name of the company came from Barclay Street in Hoboken, New Jersey. The company was later based in North Bergen, New Jersey.

In 1939, Barclay acquired another toy soldier company, Tommy Toy, and its art deco sculptor, Olive Kooken. Soldiers' uniforms followed military fashion of the times, replacing closed standing collars with open ones with shirt and tie. Wrap-around puttees were replaced by canvas leggings. Prior to the company's temporary closing in 1942, the foot soldiers were purchased individually for a nickel.

Some of Barclay's first vehicles were slush-cast white metal made in the 1930s. Some of the models were in art deco style. One selection was a "Coast to Coast" art deco style bus – another a two-tone oil tanker with pontoon fenders – on both models, fenders were different colors from the bodies. One available set had a cartoon-like strip on the box lid that stated it was a "Build and Paint Your Own Auto Set" which was "Loads of fun". The set included a four-door sedan, a two-door, and a tanker truck. It included paint, and the cars had white rubber wheels.

Also about this time, and into the 1940s, the company made a variety of military vehicles – tanks, trucks with cannon, and other cars painted brown.

== Post World War II ==
=== Soldiers ===
After World War II, Barclay's headquarters were relocated to Union City, New Jersey. Following the war, Barclay changed the helmets on their soldiers to the M1 Helmet. In about 1951, Barclay conserved metal by eliminating bases on their soldiers, which collectors nicknamed podfoot soldiers because each foot appeared as a flattened rounded blob. These were painted similar to figures in American comic books of the time – olive drab uniforms with green helmets, with "enemy" soldiers in red uniforms with white helmets. With the rising cost of metal, the price of soldiers had increased to 15 cents.

In 1960, the lead soldiers were generally removed from Woolworths and other dimestores and more commonly found for sale in hobby shops. From 1964 the soldiers' uniforms were painted in green to reflect the modern US Army.

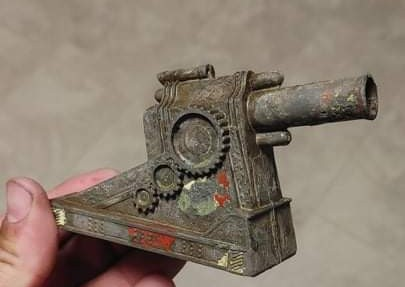

=== The ones with pinched axles ===
In the 1950s and 1960s, Barclay's diecast metal vehicles continued in popularity. Common sizes were vehicles just over 1 inch long, but others were 3 to 4 inches. A variety of cars were produced, like a tiny VW Beetle and some sports and racing cars, often with tiny metal drivers. Some generic trucks appeared as well. A compact set including a car carrier with folding ramp and four cars was released. Another was a tall-nosed GM Motorama-style pickup carrying nine wooden 'beer' barrels. This same truck also appeared in a white 'milk and ice cream' version.

Barclay 'Bottle Series' VW Bug from the early to mid-1960s. The entire package was not more than four inches tall.

Barclay cars are recognizable for their simple single cast bodies. Some Barclay models had drivers separately cast in metal and painted, then put in the proper position in the vehicles. The vehicles were adorned with neither windows nor interiors. Notable were the vehicles' pinched flat axles that protruded from the wheels. Cars were painted a variety of colors – especially bright blues, reds, and oranges.

The 'Bottle Series' Metal Miniatures were produced around 1960. Barclay's tiny vehicles were placed in a small blister card covered with clear plastic, shaped like a bottle. On one side of the package, a skyscraper was illustrated – on the other side, a country lane. The entire package was only slightly smaller than 4 x 2.75 inches. There was no decoration or writing on the cardboard back of the package. At the bottom of the package was boldly written 'All American', each letter in a square each alternating red and blue (and somewhat reminiscent of wooden letter blocks lined up). The bottle series was priced at 19 cents.

== Turbulent times ==
Barclay ceased trading in 1971 due to an inability to compete with plastics and the rapidly changing market (e.g. Mattel Hot Wheels).

== Legacy ==
The old firm's trademark rights were re-acquired in the 1990s, and the company continues to manufacture solid metal reproductions of Barclay and Manoil Manufacturing Co. figures.
