= Army men =

Plastic toy soldiers

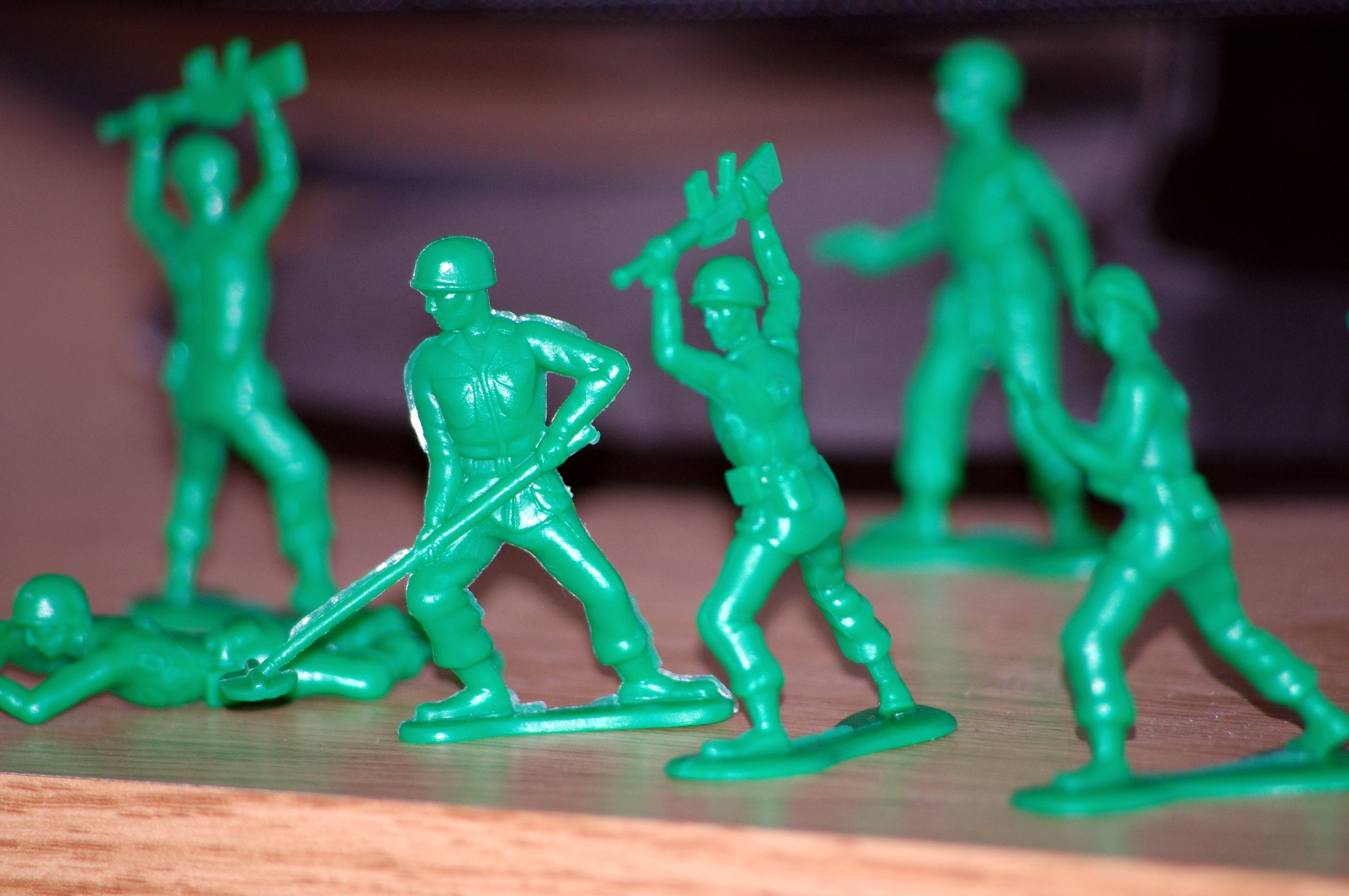
- Bunch of green army men
- Other names: Plastic soldiers
- Type: Toy soldier
- Invented by: Bergen Toy & Novelty
- Company: Bergen Toy & Novelty; Britains; Marx
- Country: United States
- Availability: 1938–present
- Materials: Low-density polyethylene
- Features: Soldier

Army men, or plastic soldiers, are toy soldiers that are about 5 cm (2.0 in) tall and most commonly molded from low-density polyethylene plastic, which makes them durable and flexible. Army men are traditionally solid green or tan, and molded with 20th-century uniforms and weapons.

Unlike the more expensive toy soldiers available in hobby shops, army men are sold at low prices in discount stores and supermarkets.

"Jumbo" army men are a less common secondary scale with 4.75-inch (12.1 cm) soldiers made by the same process.

== Description ==
Plastic army men are sold in plastic bags or buckets, and in multiple colors to represent opposing sides. They are equipped with a variety of weapons, typically from World War II to the current era, often depicting the 1964 Vietnam-era M-16 rifle with fixed M7 bayonet. These include rifles, machine guns, squad automatic weapons, submachine guns, shotguns, sniper rifles, pistols, grenades, flamethrowers, grenade launchers, miniguns, mortars, anti-tank rifles, and bazookas. They may also have radio men, binocular scouts, military police, commandos, parachute men, diggers, and minesweepers. The traditional helmets are the older M1 "steel pot" style that were issued to US soldiers during the middle to late 20th century.

Typical accoutrements depicted are often 1960s-era M1911 style pistols, ammunition pouches, and water canteens. Army men are sometimes packaged with additional accessories including tanks (often based on the M48 Patton tank), jeeps, armed hovercraft, half-tracks, artillery, flags, army trucks, helicopters, fighter jets, landing craft, amtrac amphibious vehicles, army bulldozers, and fortifications. The vehicles are usually manufactured in a smaller scale, to save on production and packaging costs.

== History and varieties ==
=== 18th and 19th centuries ===
Tin soldiers were produced in Germany as early as the 1730s, by molding the metal between two pieces of slate. Toy soldiers became widespread during the 18th century, inspired by the military exploits of Frederick the Great. Miniature soldiers were also used in the 17th, 18th, and 19th centuries by military strategists to plan battle tactics by using the figures to show the locations of real soldiers. In 1893, the British toy company William Britain revolutionized the production of toy soldiers by devising the method of hollow casting, making soldiers that were cheaper and lighter than their German counterparts.

=== 20th century ===
The first American plastic toy soldiers were made by Bergen Toy & Novelty Company (Beton for short) in 1938. Beton also acquired the molds of another pre-war plastic figure company, Universal Plastics, with their figures remaining for sale when lead toy production was stopped in 1942. The Beton figures were painted like metal figures and sold the same as their metal brethren; individually or in a boxed set of around seven figures. Following World War II, Beton modified their figures in an attempt to change the World War I type helmet into the World War II one. Following World War II, plastic manufacture was seen as an industry with growth potential with many old and new companies making plastic figures that were widely available in the United States. Army men following the war were sold unpainted, usually in a green color corresponding to United States Army uniforms in World War II.

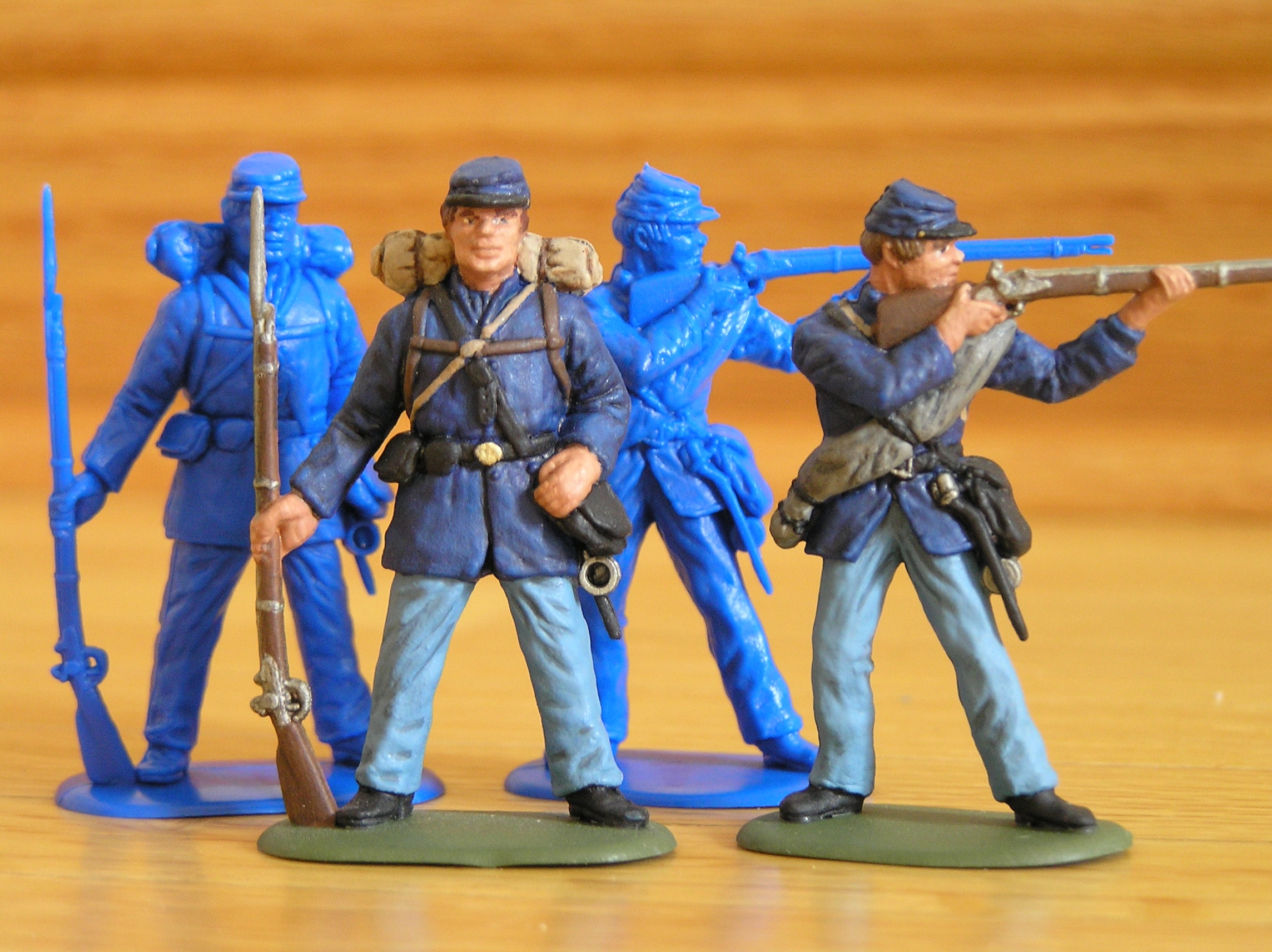
Soldiers from the American Civil War

Beginning in the early 1950s, Louis Marx and Company sold boxed sets of figures and accessories called playsets, such as "US Army Training Center" and the later "Battleground" sets. A rival manufacturer, the Multiple Plastics Corporation (MPC) also sold plastic figures in various colors with different separate accessories, so the same figures could be kitted out as soldiers (green), farmers, pioneers or cowboys (brown), policemen (blue), ski troopers (white) spacemen (various colors), or American Civil War soldiers in blue and gray. After 1950, rising production costs and the development of plastic meant that many shop keepers liked the lighter, cheaper, and far less prone to break in transit polythene figure. This led to greater demand for plastic toy soldiers.

The economy of plastic sold in bulk, popularity of army men, and competition with manufacturers led to army men being sold in large bags by Marx, Tim-Mee Toys and MPC for as little as a penny a piece in the mid-1960s. During this time, Marx gave the American army men actual enemy soldiers to fight such as German soldiers (molded in gray) in their 1962 "Army Combat" set and Japanese soldiers (molded in yellow) in their "Iwo Jima" set that was released in 1963. In 1965, a "D-Day" Marx set featured Allies such as French (horizon blue), British (khaki), and Russians. One of their last and largest playsets was the multi-level "Fortress Navarone" mountain set based on The Guns of Navarone, which was available in the 1970s and pitted World War II Americans against Germans.

During the Vietnam War, sales and availability of military toys began to decline alongside the unpopularity of the war and the higher prices of plastic from the 1973 oil crisis. Since 1975, many manufacturers of plastic soldiers in Europe and US closed, for example John Hill & Company, Reamsa, Louis Marx and Company, and Dinky Toys.

=== Present day ===
The most well-known toy product which gave rise to the toy type of "army men" was the set of figures sold by the company Tim Mee Toys, which began in the 1940s, and which closed in 2005. Currently, the company BMC Toys sells the same figures. Regarding this iconic set, one website notes:

The absolute number one most common plastic army men of today are Vietnam-era soldiers. They have barebones kits, consisting only of their M16 rifle. They sometimes replace their M16 with a bazooka, flamethrower, or radio. These figures are being produced by TimMee Toys. They also are the inspiration for the army men we see in the Pixar movie, Toy Story.

If you walk into the grocery store and head for the toy aisle, you'll likely find a bag of these guys for sale. ...these army men were once available in every single store in America. Gas station, grocery store, convenience store, it didn't matter – you'd be able to find a bag of army men with ease.

Today most army men are made inexpensively in China and do not include the extensive accessories that were common in Marx playsets. They are also smaller on average, often not much more than 2.5 cm (one inch) high. Most of these figures are generic imitations of model figure sets from such companies as Airfix and Matchbox. They vary widely in quality.

The phrase army men as a type encompasses many other inexpensive, plastic toy figures made out of molded plastic. Toy cowboys and Indians, farm sets, scuba divers, spacemen, knights, dinosaurs, firemen, police officers and other playsets are often sold alongside army men.

In September 2019, BMC Toys, a maker of army men, announced that army women would be sold in 2020. This announcement was made due to popular request from female veterans and toy fans. The most well-known request is from a six-year-old girl who sent a handwritten letter for them to be made.

== Army men in culture ==
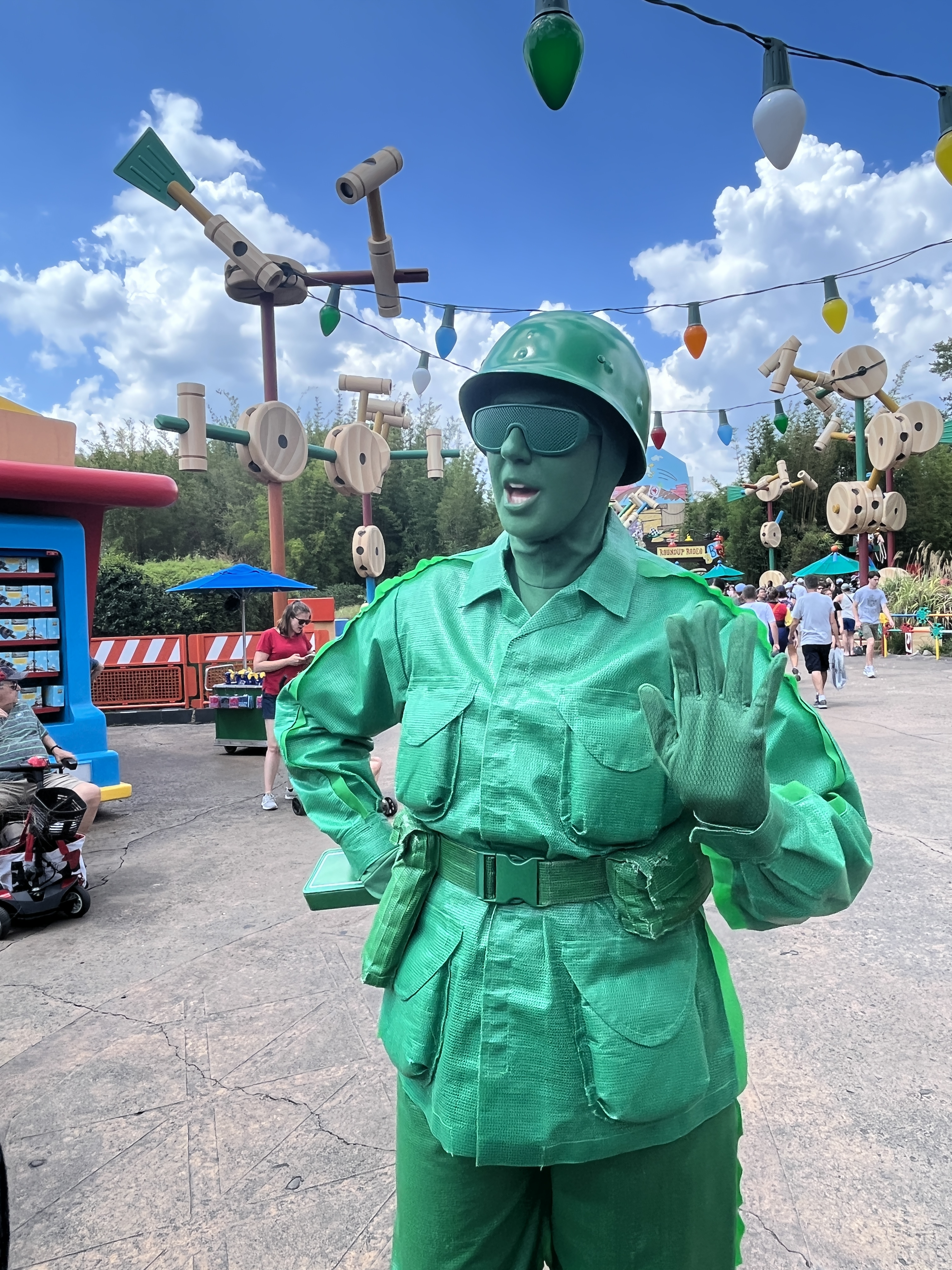
Green army man from Toy Story at Disney's Hollywood Studios

In 2011, Time magazine placed the army men on their list of 100 most popular toys of all time. This cultural phenomenon was represented in Army Men, a popular series of video games introduced by 3DO in the 1990s. Green army men were also minor characters in the 1995 Disney•Pixar animated film Toy Story and its first two sequels. Gummy army men candy is also available.

Because these toys do not cost much, they are virtually disposable. They encourage a variety of creative types of play, because they can be set up in many different ways. They are especially well suited for the sandbox, or simple wargames with rubber balls or marbles, which can be rolled or thrown at army men.

Army men have been banned from schools and daycare programs with zero tolerance weapon policies. On one occasion, children were asked to clip the weapons off of plastic army men on display during an elementary school graduation ceremony. When Burger King released tie-in toys for the movie Toy Story, the green army men were not featured with weapons, but only the variations of leader, radio operator, minesweeper, and man with binoculars.

Army men candy

An unusual use for army men was attaching poems to them and scattering them around in a "guerrilla poetry" scheme. They have also been the exclusive (albeit stop-motion) actors in a music video featuring an instrumental track by the band Pink Martini, as well as for use in experimental marine ecology examining habitat selection in the estuarine shrimp, Palaemon macrodactylus.

The 1972 Stephen King short story "Battleground", and a 2006 episode of Nightmares and Dreamscapes: From the Stories of Stephen King based upon the short story, feature plastic army men who come alive with sinister intentions.

In Witching & Bitching, a 2013 Spanish horror-comedy film co-written and directed by Álex de la Iglesia, Mario Casas impersonates a thief disguised as street mime. Dressed as a green army man, his skin, helmet and uniform are completely painted in the typical bright green color.

In Heroes of the Storm (2015), a multiplayer video game by Blizzard Entertainment, there are several hero skins with green army men theme.

Russian masked soldiers operating inside Ukraine during the 2014 annexation of Crimea by the Russian Federation became known as "little green men" in reference to the green plastic toy soldiers.

== See also ==
- Britains Deetail
- Action figure
- Figurine
- List of toys
- Model figure
