= Manoil Manufacturing Co. =

American Toy Company

Manoil Manufacturing Company was an American metal and plastic toy manufacturer established in 1935 and ceased production in 1959.

== History ==
Manoil was founded by brothers, Maurice and Jack Manoil who began manufacturing toys in 1934 in their Manhattan factory. After first producing die-cast toy cars, Manoil began to produce toy soldiers in 1935. They were sculpted by Walter Baetz.

From June 1940 on, the company was located on Providence Street in Waverly, NY, in Tioga County. It was most successful from 1937 to 1941 when it produced hollowcast lead toy soldiers, known as dimestore soldiers. The company also produced toy airplanes and cars, as well as farm and western playsets.

== See also ==
- Barclay Manufacturing Company
- Toy soldier
