= Ford 5000 =

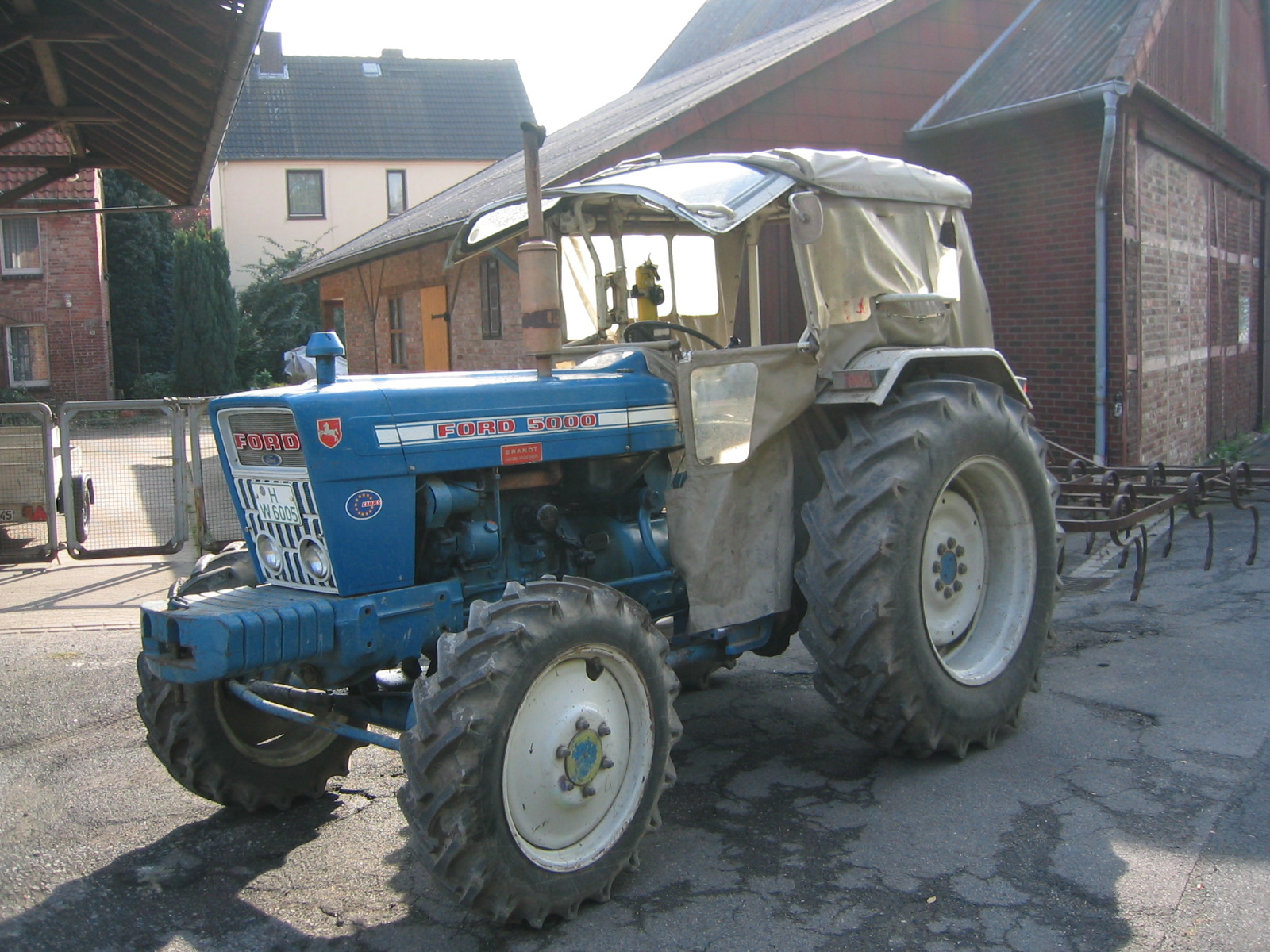

Overview
- Type: Agricultural tractor
- Manufacturer: Ford
- Production: 1964-1975

Powertrain
- Propulsion: Wheels

Dimensions
- Length: 141.6 inches (360 cm)
- Width: 68.5 inches (174 cm)
- Height: 63.5 inches (161 cm) (steering wheel); 86.4 inches (219 cm) (exhaust)
- Curb weight: 5,865 pounds (2,660 kg) (operating weight); 9,700 pounds (4,400 kg) (ballasted weight)

The Ford 5000 is a blue and white tractor that was produced from 1964 to 1975 by Ford. It was a mid-range tractor, suitable for European farms. The North American version was slightly different and was named the Ford Major. A similar model, the Ford 3000 was introduced in the spring of 1965.

== Europe ==
The tractor was released in mainland Europe in 1964, and sold moderately. As time went on, there were more Ford 5000s being sold and could be compared to the New Holland TM series which was in production from 1997 to 2004.

== Great Britain ==
The tractor sold exceptionally well in Great Britain. The tractor replaced the long-running Fordson Major which was a worldwide hit. It sold especially well because it slotted into the mid-sized range, which catered for almost every British farmer. It sold so well it was in the top ten best-selling list of tractors sold in Great Britain until 2005.

The Ford 5000 was used by E. Doe to build the uprated version of the Doe Triple D in 1964. The Doe tractor was 2 Tractors fixed together at a central pivot, with the front axles removed to form an articulated tractor with twice the power and 4-wd. This new version was called the Doe 130, as it was rated at 130 hp (97 kW) from the 2 F5000 units. Following its launch at the Smithfield Show in December 1964, they sold 73 units in 1965.

== Ireland ==
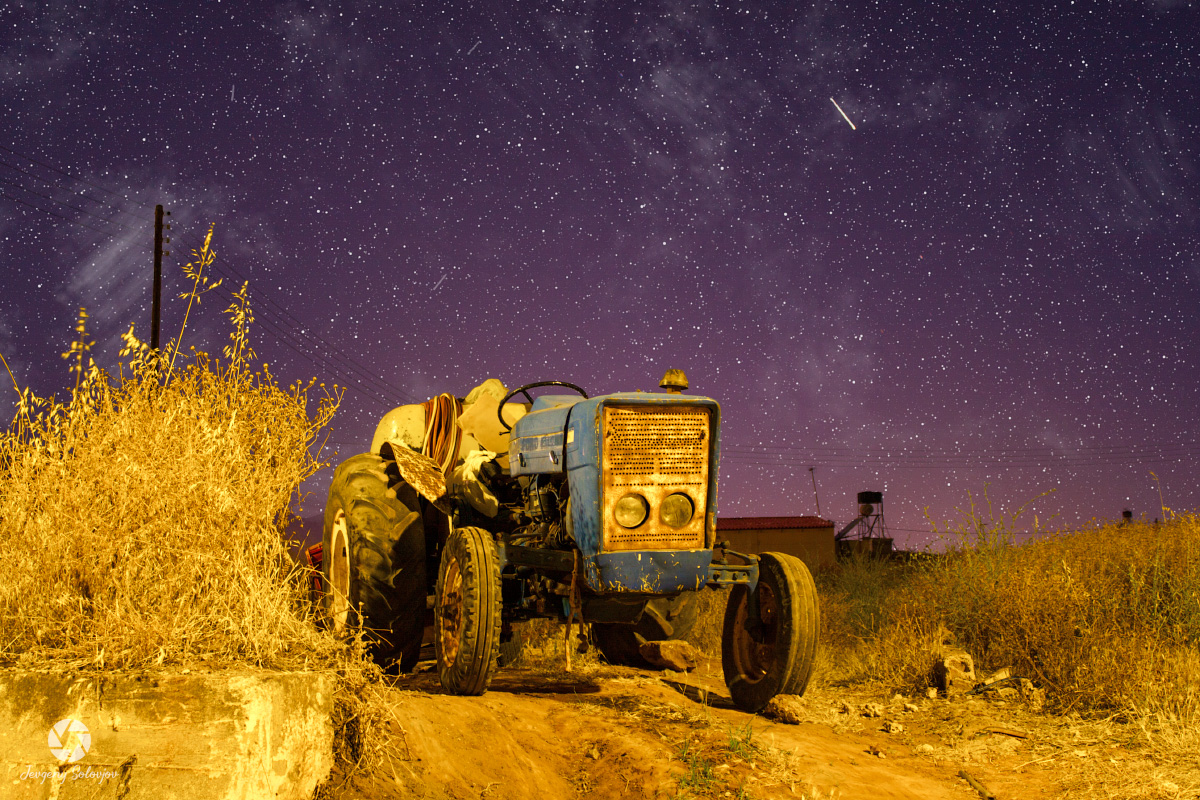
Ford 5000 Tractor, Malia, Crete, 2017

In Ireland, Ford tractors, lorries and cars sold very very well because at one time Ford had a factory in Cork. Selling the Fordson Major and Ford 4000 was of no problem and selling the Ford 5000 was even easier. Like Great Britain, it was launched in the mid-sized range, which, like Great Britain, was the main market for Irish farmers. It sold very well and is the third best-selling tractor in the history of Ireland. According to a 2004 tractor survey, there were more than 200 Ford 5000s being in everyday use in every province.

== Changes ==
After its launch in 1964 the Ford 5000, alongside the other models in its range, stayed in production until 1968, when they were upgraded into the Ford Force series. Some modifications were done to the engine and other components which resulted in more power for the Ford 5000, now rated at 75 hp (56 kW). Additionally, the sheet metal was modified to give the tractor a more modern appearance. In 1971 a few minor changes were done to the engine, and a factory fitted safety cab could now be ordered as well. In 1975, Ford retired the Ford 5000, and all of its range with it, after eleven years production. It was one of the company's best selling tractors.

== Gallery ==
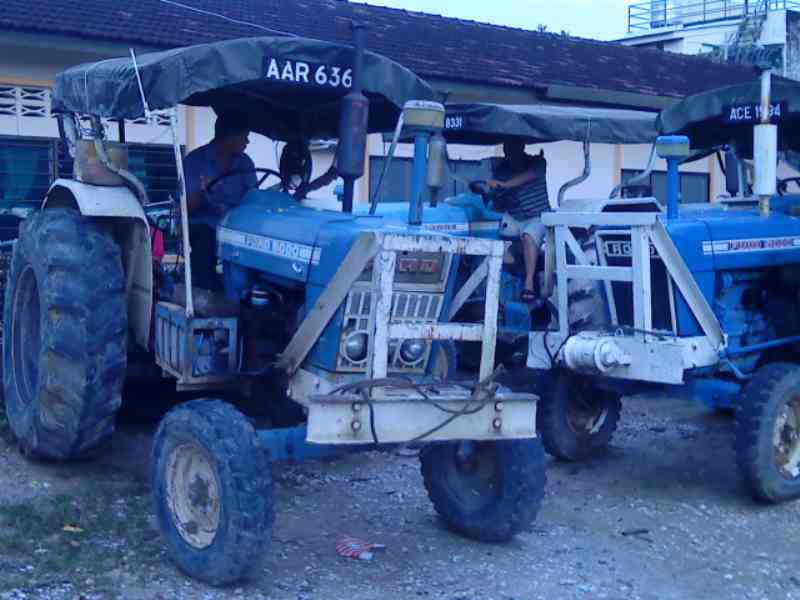
Back Pusher (Tractor).
