= Ford 3000 =

Tractor model

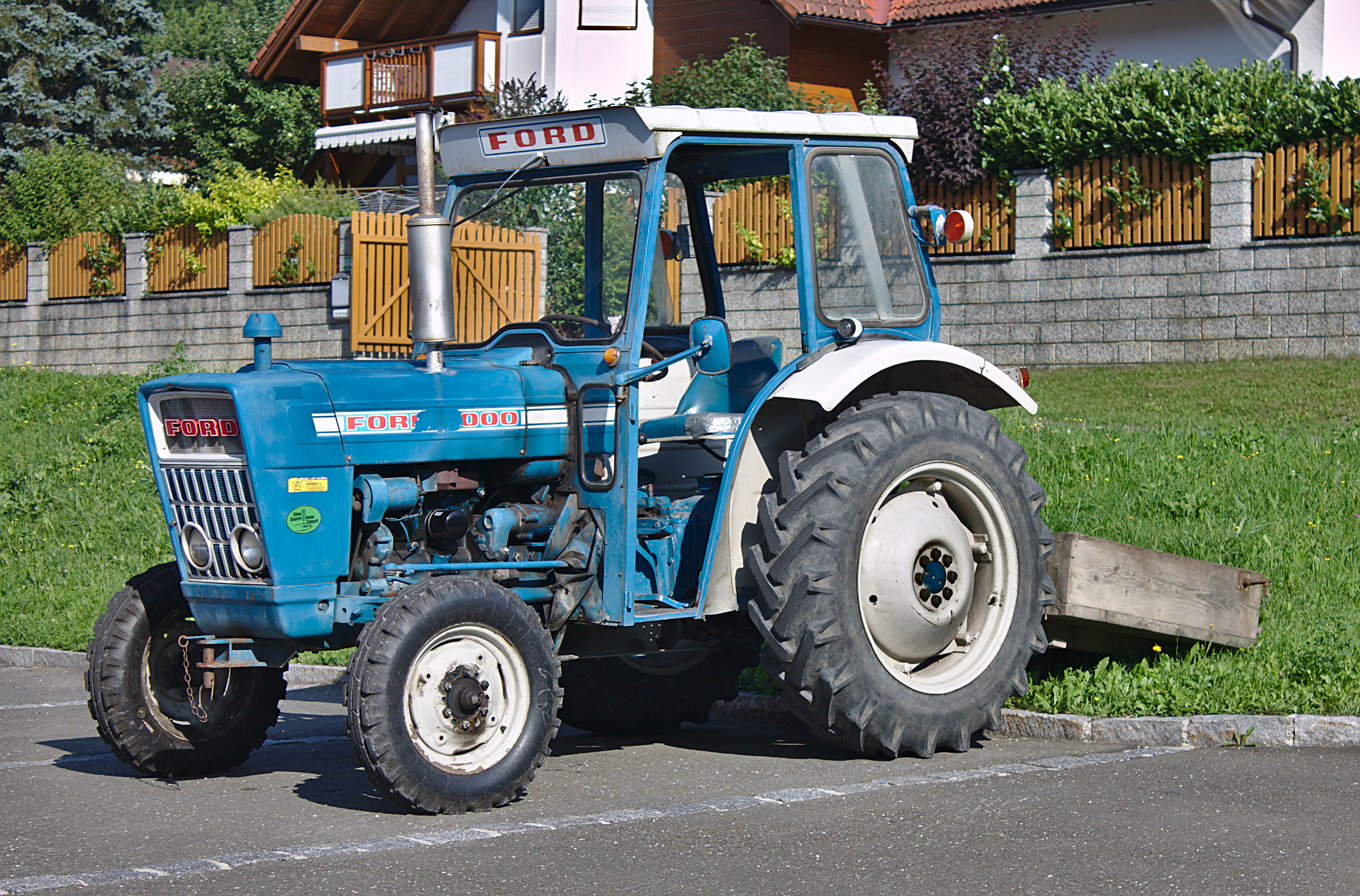
70s era Ford 3000

The Ford 3000 is a tractor that was introduced by Ford in the spring of 1965. It was part of Ford's Thousand Series of tractors. This was a "ground up" new platform designed to replace the "Prior" or "Hundred Series" Fords built from 1955 through 1964. It has a 3-cylinder OHV, water-cooled engine.

It could be ordered with a Ford-built 158-cubic-inch (2,590 cc) gas or 175-cubic-inch (2,870 cc) diesel engine. It was rated at 35 horsepower at the PTO. Optional transmissions were a 4-speed, 6-speed (3-speed with high and low), 8-speed (4-speed with high and low) and a 10-speed 'Select O Speed' power shift transmission.

Some of the available options were differential lock, power steering, Live PTO and hydraulic remote valves. Standard front wheels were 5.5X16 and two options were available for the rear wheels - either 13.6X28 or 14.9X24.
