= Britains =

British toy brand and manufacturing company

- Type: Private (1893–1997)
- Founded: 1893; 133 years ago
- Founder: William Britain Jr
- Fate: Acquired by Ertl in 1997, then other owners, currently a brand
- Headquarters: London, UK
- Products: Scale model agricultural machinery, figurines
- Owner: Tomy (2011–present); Learning Curve UK (2010–11); Racing Champions (1999–2010); Ertl (1997–1999)
- Website: britainsfarmtoys.co.uk

Britains, earlier known by the founder's name W. Britain, is a British toy brand and former manufacturing company known for its die-cast scale models of agricultural machinery, and figurines. The company was established in 1893 as a toy soldiers manufacturer.

With its factory set in London, Britains then diversified into other associated toys such as die-cast zamac military trucks, commercial vehicles, and toy cars.

Today, the Britains brand is owned by Tomy since 2011, and the W. Britain brand by First Gear, Inc.

== History ==
The "W. Britain" brand name of toy and collectable soldiers is derived from a company founded by William Britain Jr., a British toy manufacturer, who in 1893 invented the process of hollow casting in lead, and revolutionized the production of toy soldiers. The company quickly became the industry leader, and was imitated by many other companies, such as Hanks Bros. and John Hill and Co. The style and scale of Britain's figures became the industry standard for toy soldiers for many years.

In 1907 the family proprietorship, William Britain & Sons, incorporated as "Britains, Ltd". The Britain family controlled the firm until 1984 when it was sold to a British conglomerate, Dobson Park Industries. They combined the operations with an existing line of toys and renamed the company Britains Petite, Ltd. During the first half of the 20th century, Britains expanded its range and market. By 1931 the firm employed 450 at its London factory. The catalogue had expanded to 435 sets and twenty million models a year were being produced.

In the early 1950s Britains was associated with W. Horton Toys and Games which made the die-cast Lilliput ranges of small-scale, rather generic, cars and trucks and other vehicles. In 1959, Britains acquired Herald Miniatures which produced plastic figures designed by Roy Selwyn-Smith. The company was also known for its American Revolutionary War soldiers.

In the 1950s, besides soldiers, a variety of vehicles began to appear, mostly in the military field. One such detailed die-cast vehicle was a Royal Artillery 4.5" howitzer towable cannon that fired toy shells. For a toy, it was intricately designed, with a special threaded post with rotating knob to raise and lower the cannon. Also in early 1950s, one of the first Britains vehicles was a Bluebird land speed record car of famed driver Malcolm Campbell. It had a removable body and the box showed a detailed cut-away illustration of the car. Land Rovers, and later Range Rovers and various commercial lorries, such as a milk tanker, flat bed, tipper, cement mixer, also appeared.

In 1966 safety regulations in the United Kingdom combined with rising costs halted the production of lead toy soldiers. Britains shifted most production of Herald plastic to Hong Kong from 1966. In 1971 Britains started Deetail plastic figures with metal bases that were initially manufactured in England but later outsourced to China.

When production stopped, the range of catalogued lead sets exceeded 2200. In 1973 Britains introduced New Metal models, which are die cast in a durable alloy. Initially these sets were aimed at the British souvenir market. In 1983 Britains responded to a growing collectors' market by introducing additional models and limited edition sets. This range was greatly expanded over the next 20 years and included die-cast versions of their old toy soldiers, some made from original moulds. These, as well as the lines of Britains Deetail plastic figures and accessories, and their older sets have become highly collectable.

=== Britains in the 21st Century ===
In 1997, Britains Petite, Ltd was bought by Ertl Company of Iowa, a maker of die-cast toys. Ertl was subsequently bought by RC2 LLC, another American die-cast miniature and plastic kit maker. At this time, production of toy soldiers was moved to China. In 2011, Japanese-headquartered toy company Tomy acquired RC2 which included the Britains die-cast farm miniatures range. In 2021, Tomy celebrated 100 years of the Britains farm miniatures range.

=== W. Britains in the 21st Century ===
In 2005, the W. Britains brand was acquired by First Gear, an American maker of die-cast collectibles. This firm produces and sells mostly contemporary matte-style figures to the collectors market under the W. Britain brand. Kenneth A. Osen was the master sculptor for W. Britain until June 2013 when he was appointed General Manager & Creative Director. Sculpting continues to be done by Ken Osen, Alan Ball and Graham Scollick. All figures are sculpted by hand, to scale, before duplication. First Gear sold W.Britain to The Good Soldier, LLC in 2016. In May of 2020 W.Britain was sold to On The Mantle, LLC of Chillicothe, Ohio. On The Mantle, LLC retained all employees and moved all operations to Chillicothe. On 30 January 2012 Bachmann Europe Plc became the sole distributor of all W. Britain figures in the UK and Continental Europe until 2023 when all distribution reverted back to the world headquarters in Chillicothe, Ohio, USA.

== Britains Farm ==
In 1921, the Britains "Model Home Farm" was launched, including 30 farm figures and animals as well as the first farm vehicle, a tumbrel cart. The first tractor model was the Fordson Major, introduced in 1948, three years after the real tractor. In 1968, the Massey Ferguson 135 became the first non-Ford tractor in the range. The Massey Ferguson 760 combine harvester was voted UK Toy of the Year in 1978. In the 1980s more than 120 new models were produced for the Britains Farm. 2007 saw the first vintage model, the Ford 5000 tractor. In 2021 Britains celebrated 100 years as Europe’s oldest specialist in farm toys with a limited edition of the Fordson Major tractor.

== See also ==
- Britains Deetail
- Toy soldier
- Hollow casting
- Little Wars
