= Britains Deetail =

Toy line

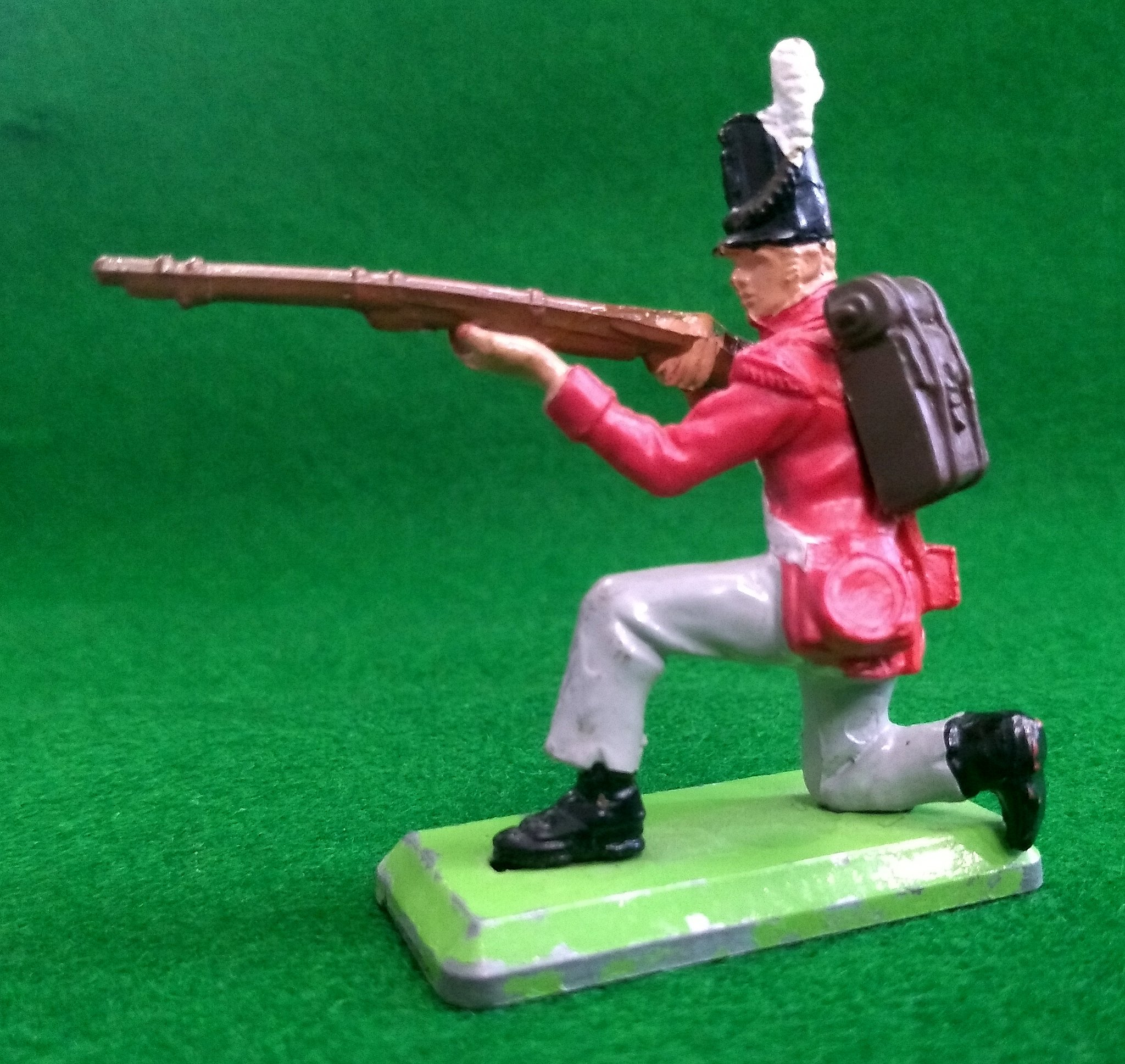
Britains Deetail Waterloo British Soldier - Kneeling Back (Playworn)

Britains' Deetail toy soldiers were a popular product in the 1970s and 1980s. Manufactured in England by W. Britain, the 1/32 (54mm) scale plastic figures were finished with hand painted details and came with sturdy Zamak metal bases. In the early 1990s production moved to China before eventually being phased out.

== Development ==
In 1971, Britains began phasing out its plastic Herald Miniatures produced in Hong Kong since 1966, with Herald eventually ceasing production in 1976. New Deetail figures were produced moulded in PVC plastic rather than polythene and using plug-in type arms, which were glued to bodies resulting in poses previously unavailable. Figures were moulded with a tee shaped "footlug" on the feet of each figure that allowed secure attachment to sturdy metal bases. These rectangular metal bases ensured figures stood better than rival manufacturers products and paid homage to Britains hollowcast metal figures as well as being thought by consumers to be of "better value" due to their heavier weight.

The first Deetail figures produced were based upon Second World War (WW2) American and German infantry. Sculptor Rod Cameron rented uniforms from Berman's and Nathan's theatrical costumes with Cameron giving model Les Harden his air rifle to pose with.

In 1978 Britains developed the Super Deetail range using an overmoulding process whereby different coloured plastics came together in one figure. The initial release were modern British paratroopers with red berets.

== Range ==
Figures were generally produced in six different standing poses and represented various historical periods from medieval to the modern era including:

- Knights and Turks
- Waterloo
- American Wild West - Cowboys and Indians, 7th Cavalry, etc.
- American Civil War
- African Desert
- Military - WW2 British, American, German; Modern; Guards, etc.
- Space

Mounted figures were also released including a horse on metal base with rider glued in place. Riders and horses were presented in various different poses and came with reins, saddle and saddle blanket, which differed dependent upon the theme. All were commercially available from retail outlets and sold either loose or from retail/trade "counter" boxes containing 48 pcs for standing (usually eight of each pose); 18 pcs for mounted figures (six of each pose); or 12 for combat weapons sets - these retail boxes also came with handy plinths to display the models, which sat across the top of each box as a promotional item. Many factory sealed boxed/play sets (ranging from 5-18 figures) were issued to retailers, along with smaller "blister" type packs containing several figures bundled together, and a "Patrol" range that included figures and a combat weapon.

In addition, Britains also produced sets which incorporated Deetail style figures that were marketed as Combat Weapons (mortar, recoilless rifle, gatling gun, etc.), Military Vehicles (scout cars, jeeps, etc.) and Motorcycles (dispatch rider, motorcycle combination). Combat Weapons sets used working, spring loaded firing mechanisms within the models, and were supplied with "ammunition" - 9 ball bearings for the Vickers and Gatling gun sets, and 12 plastic shells on a sprue for mortars and recoilless rifle.

=== Knights and Turks ===
==== Knights ====
7740 Series One (Foot)

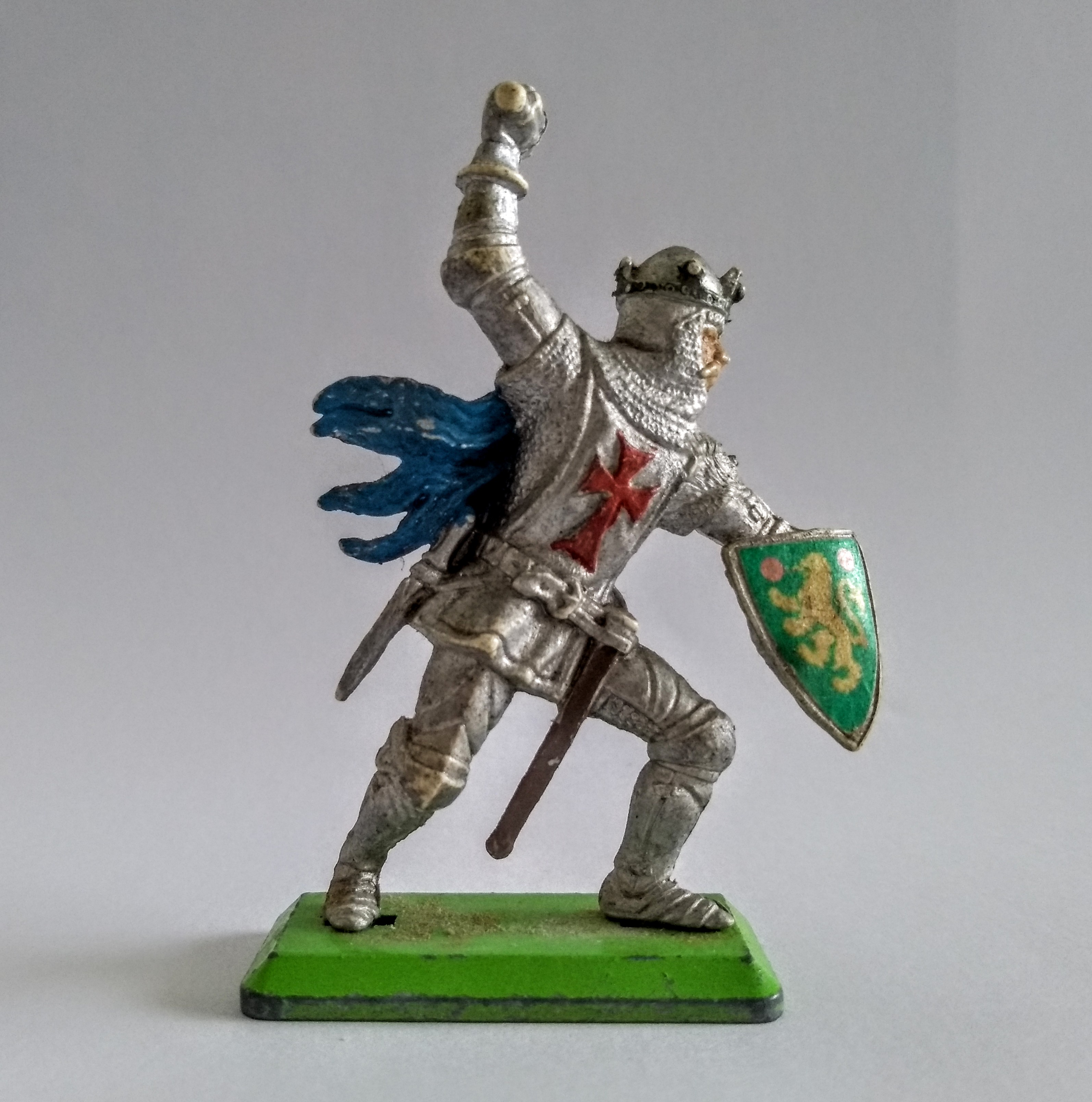
- Britains Deetail Knight King with Sword - O
  King with Sword.
- Knight sword low and back and shield.
- Knight sword overhead and shield.
- Knight sword high back and shield.
- Knight with halberd in both hands.
- Knight axe overhead held in both hands.

7730 Series Two (Foot)

==== Turks ====
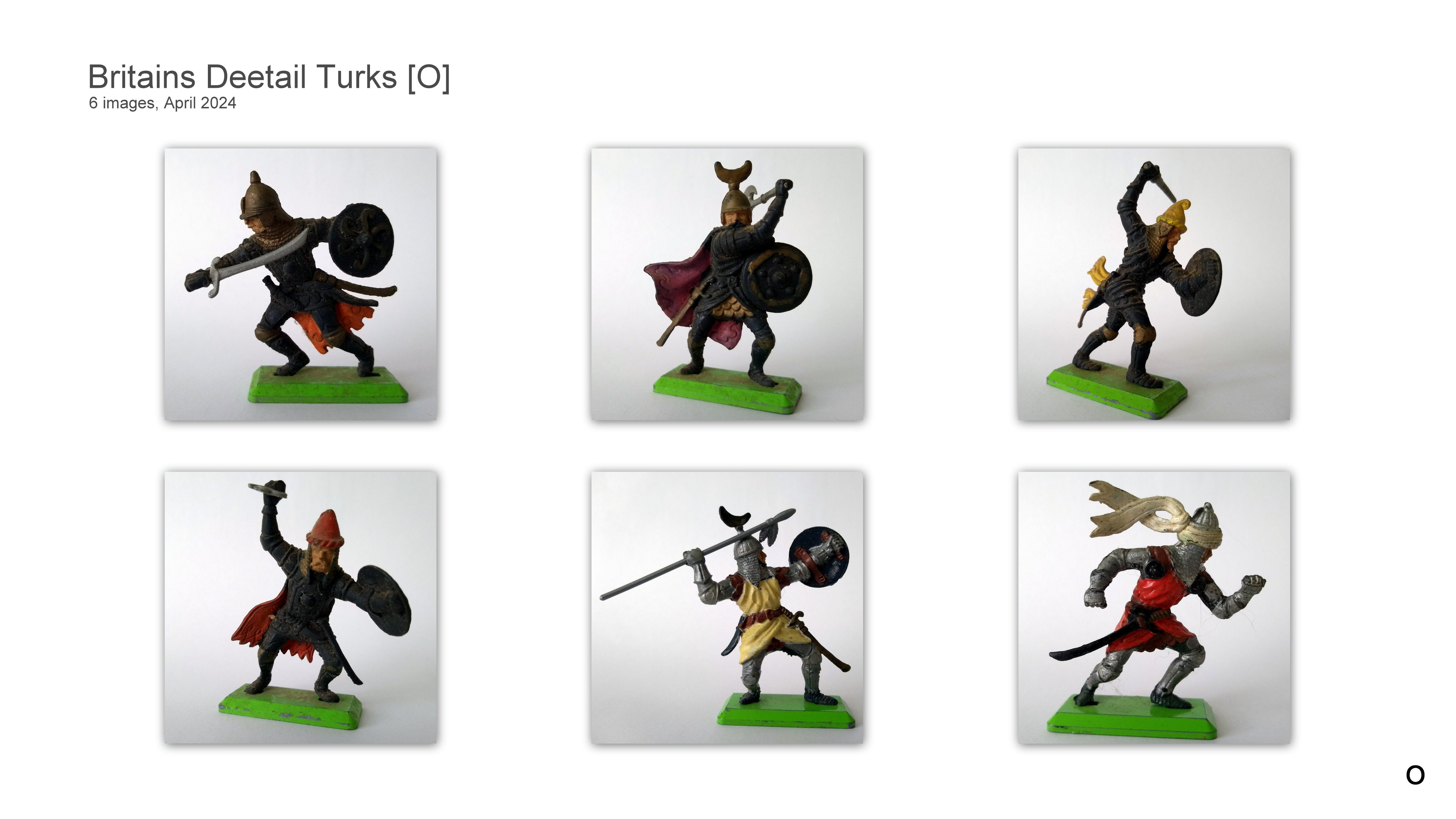
Britains Deetail Turks (O

7750

==== Issued Sets ====
TBC

=== Waterloo (1815) ===
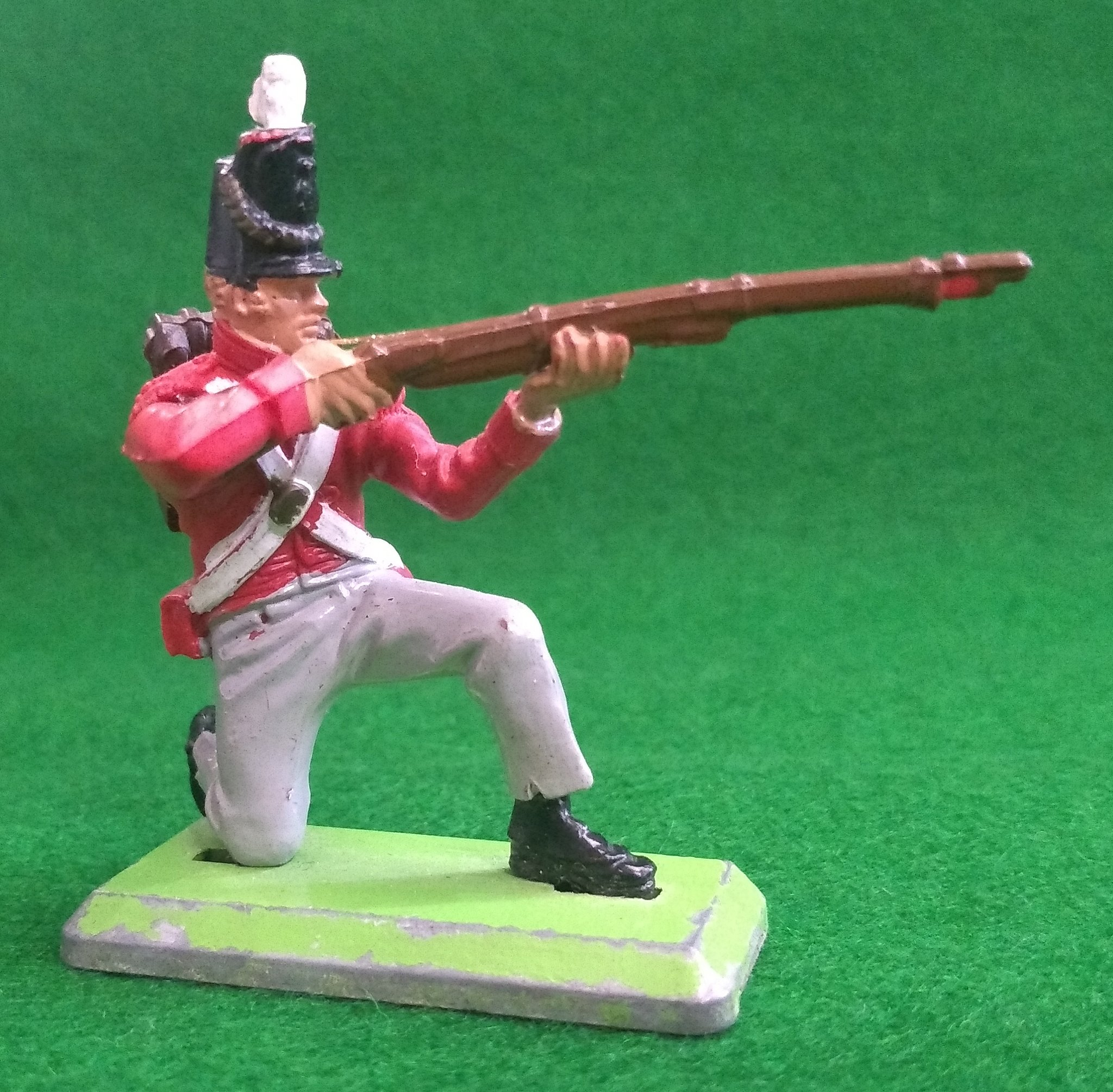
Britains Deetail Waterloo British Soldier - Kneeling (Playworn)

Like Airfix, Britains used the label Waterloo rather than Napoleonic. Figures depicting British and French armies were produced from 1974-79 in foot and mounted types.

==== British ====
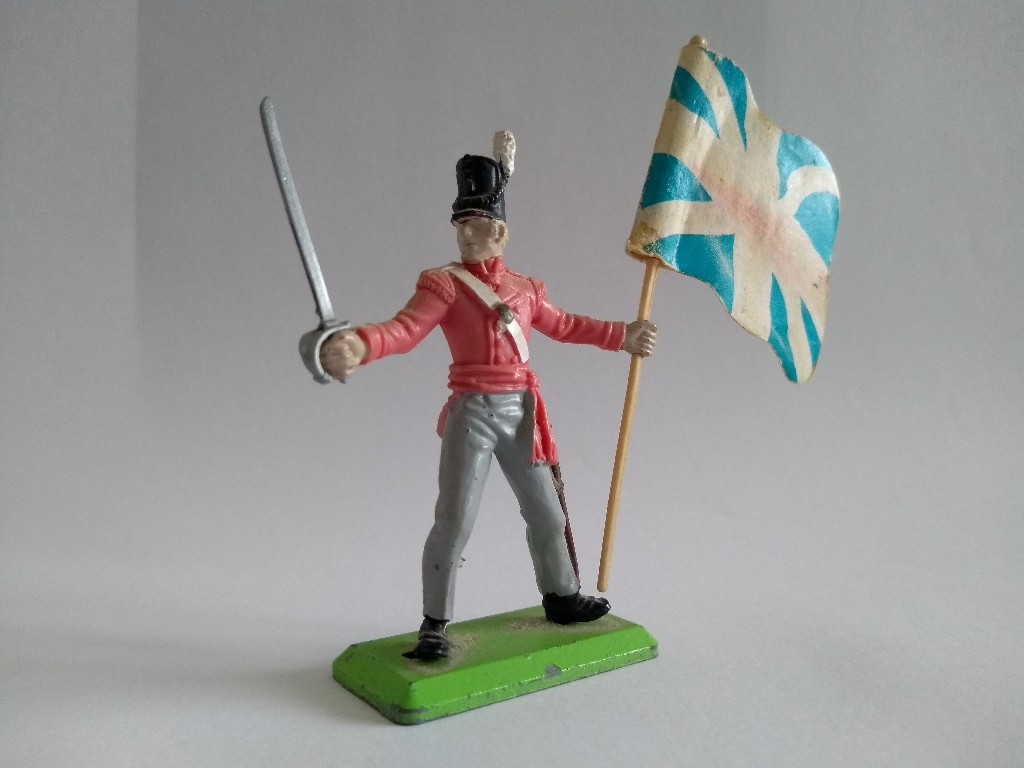
- Britains Deetail Waterloo British Officer with Sword and Flag
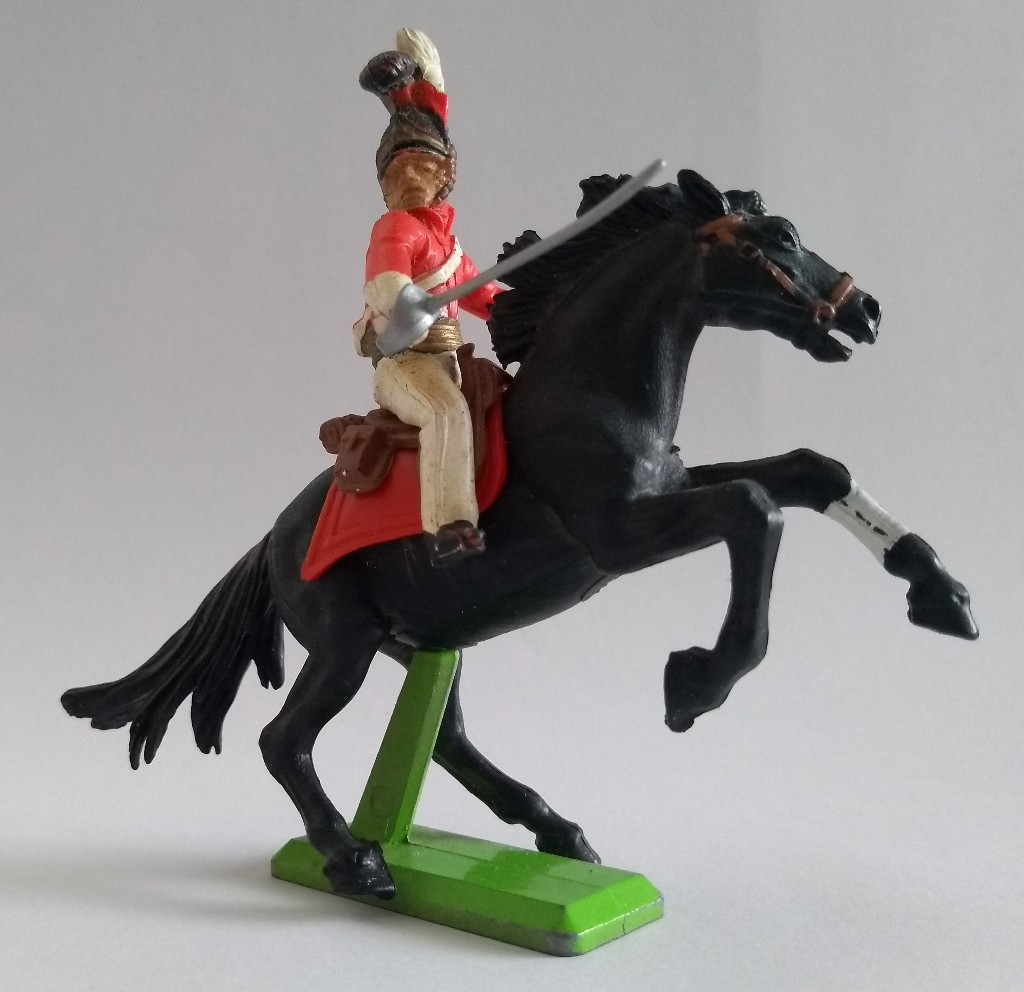
  British Deetail Waterloo Mounted Horseman
  Infantry - 3 x Foot (advancing with rifle; kneeling shooting; officer holding sword & flag); and 3 x Highland Black Watch (kneeling with rifle; standing shooting rifle; advancing with rifle)
- Cavalry - 2 x Hussars, 2 x Scots Greys, 2 x Life Guards

==== French ====
- Infantry - 3 x Line Infantry (advancing with rifle; standing shooting rifle; officer holding sword & flag) and 3 Imperial Guard (kneeling with rifle; standing shooting rifle; advancing with rifle)
- Cavalry - 2 x Hussars 2 x Cuirassier 2 x Carabinier

==== Issued Sets ====
- 7940 British Infantry retail counter box (48 pcs)
- 7950 French Infantry retail counter box (48 pcs)
- 7949 British Cavalry retail counter box (18 pcs)
- 7959 French Cavalry retail counter box (18 pcs)
- 7944 British Infantry 6 pcs
- 7945 British 6 pcs (2 mounted)
- 7946 British & French 5 pcs
- 7947 British 12 pcs (3 mounted)
- 7954 French Infantry 6 pcs
- 7955 French 6 pcs (2 mounted)
- 7956 British & French 5 pcs
- 7957 French 12 pcs (3 mounted)
- 7960 British & French 12 pcs (2 mounted)

=== African Desert (1900s) ===
Figures depicting French Foreign Legion (FFL) legionnaires and Arab tribesmen were produced in foot and mounted types from 1975-78.

==== French Foreign Legion ====
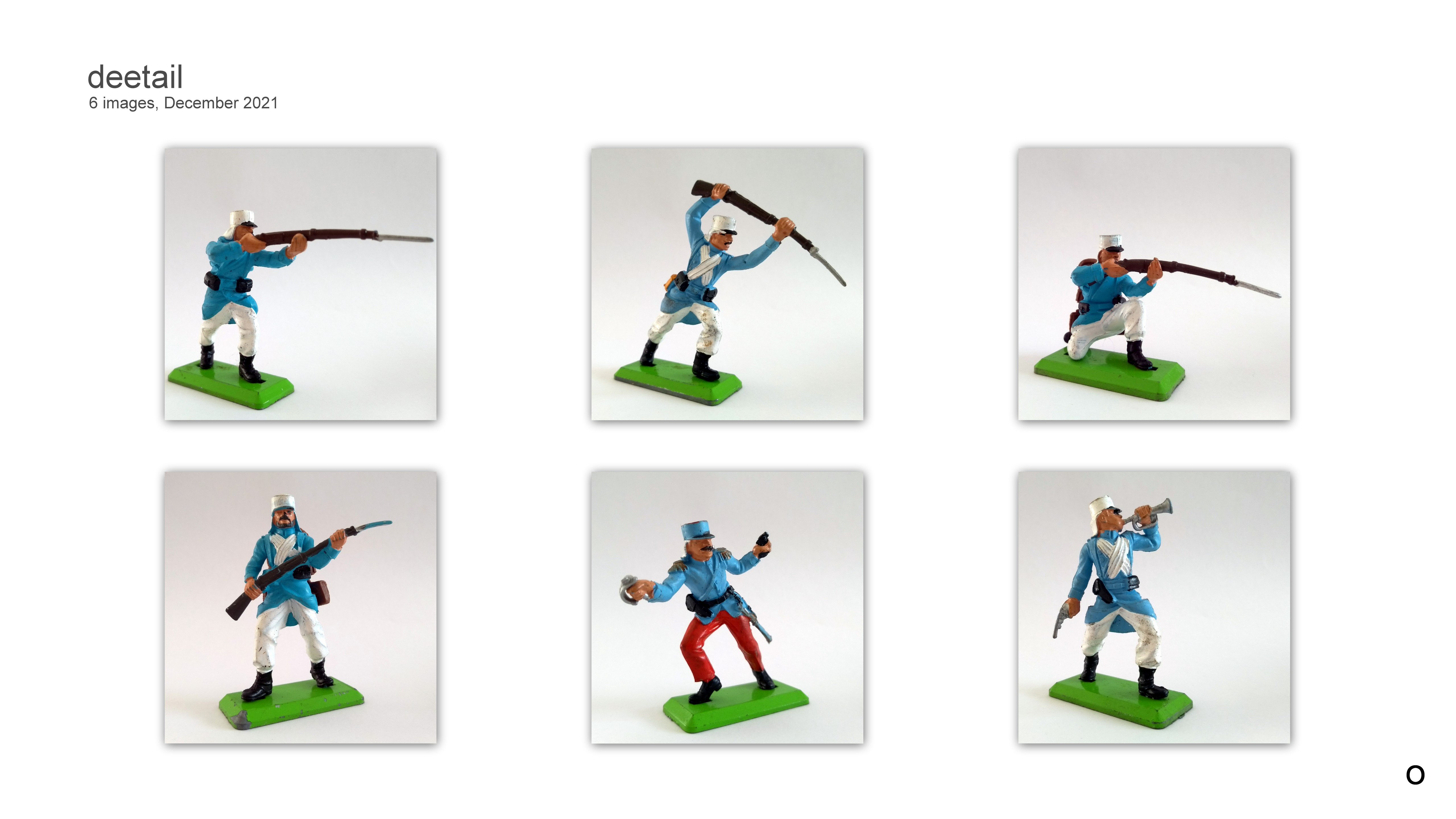
Britains Deetail Foreign Legion - O

- 6 Legionnaires including an officer
- 6 cavalry including an officer
- Combat Weapons - Gatling gun set with 2 figures (officer and gunner) and ammunition.

==== Arab Tribesmen ====
- 6 foot
- 6 mounted

==== Issued Sets ====
- 7780 FFL retail counter box (48 pcs)
- 7790 Arab retail counter box (48 pcs)
- 7779 FFL retail counter box (18 pcs mounted)
- 77-- Arab retail counter box (18 pcs mounted)
- 7770 FFL Gatling Gun retail counter box (12 pcs)
- 7785 FFL (6 pcs)
- 7785 FFL (6 pcs, 2 mounted)
- 7775 FFL & Arabs (6 pcs, 2 mounted)
- 7783 FFL Patrol (4 pcs, 1 Gatling Gun)
- 7787 FFL (12 pcs, 3 mounted)
- 7795 Arabs (6 pcs, 2 mounted)
- 7797 Arabs (12 pcs 3 mounted)
- 7799 FFL & Arab (12 pcs, 2 mounted)

=== American Wild West (1870s) ===
Figures depicting US 7th Cavalry, cowboys, Apache, Sioux and Mexicans were produced in foot and mounted types.

==== US 7th Cavalry ====
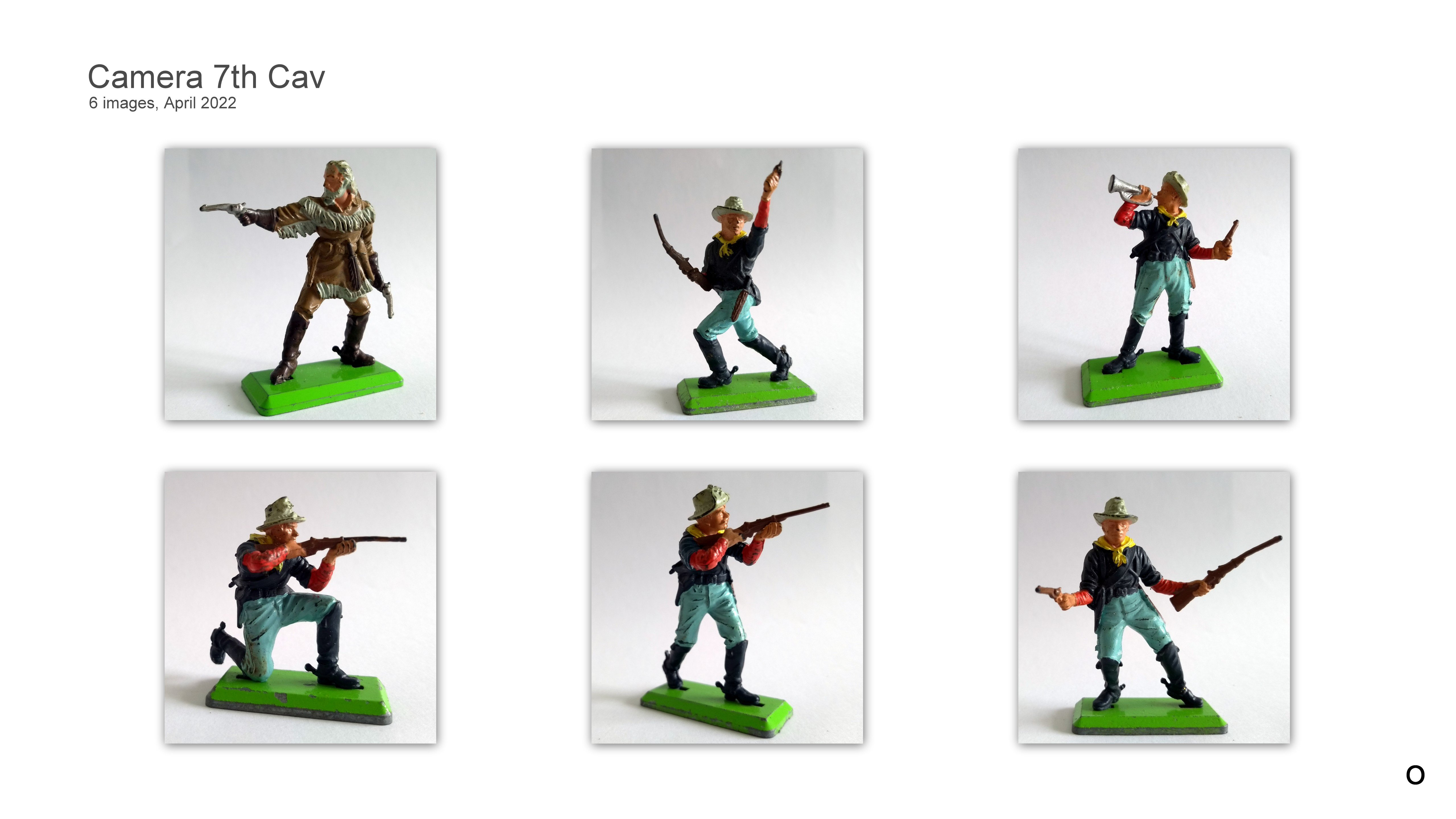
Britains Deetail - 7th Cavalry [O]

- 6 troopers including General Custer. General Custer is the only model in the Britains Deetail range that represents a real historical person.
- 6 cavalry

==== Cowboys ====
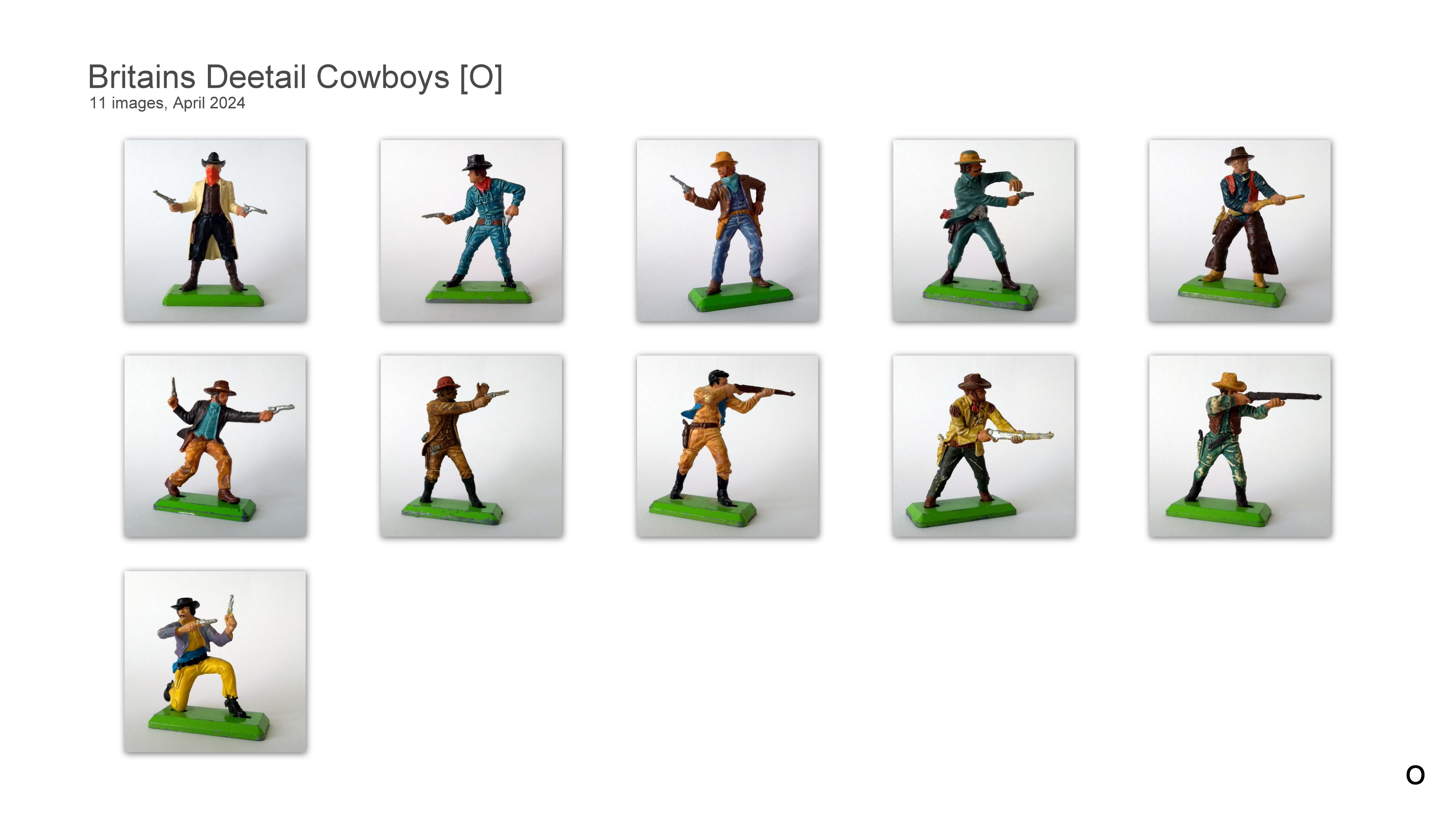
Britains Deetail Cowboys (O)

- 6 foot
- 6 mounted

==== Sioux ====
- 7 foot warriors
- 6 mounted warriors

One standing figure was discontinued and a brand new pose was created because it was easier to manufacture. The older pose came with a separate spear and the new one has no additional parts but holds an axe and a pistol.

==== Apache ====
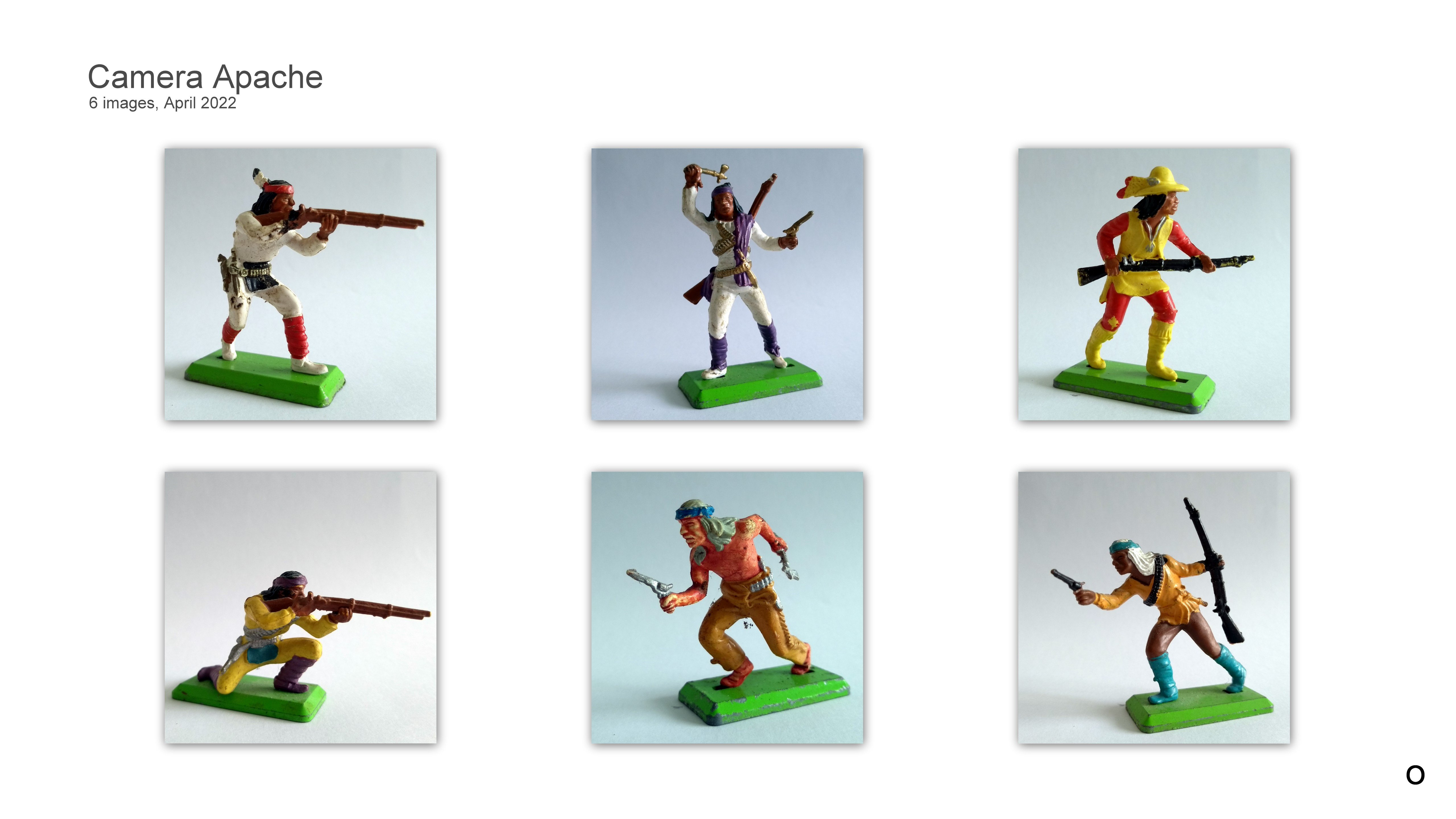
Britains Deetail - Apache [O]

- 6 foot warriors
- 6 mounted warriors

==== Mexicans ====
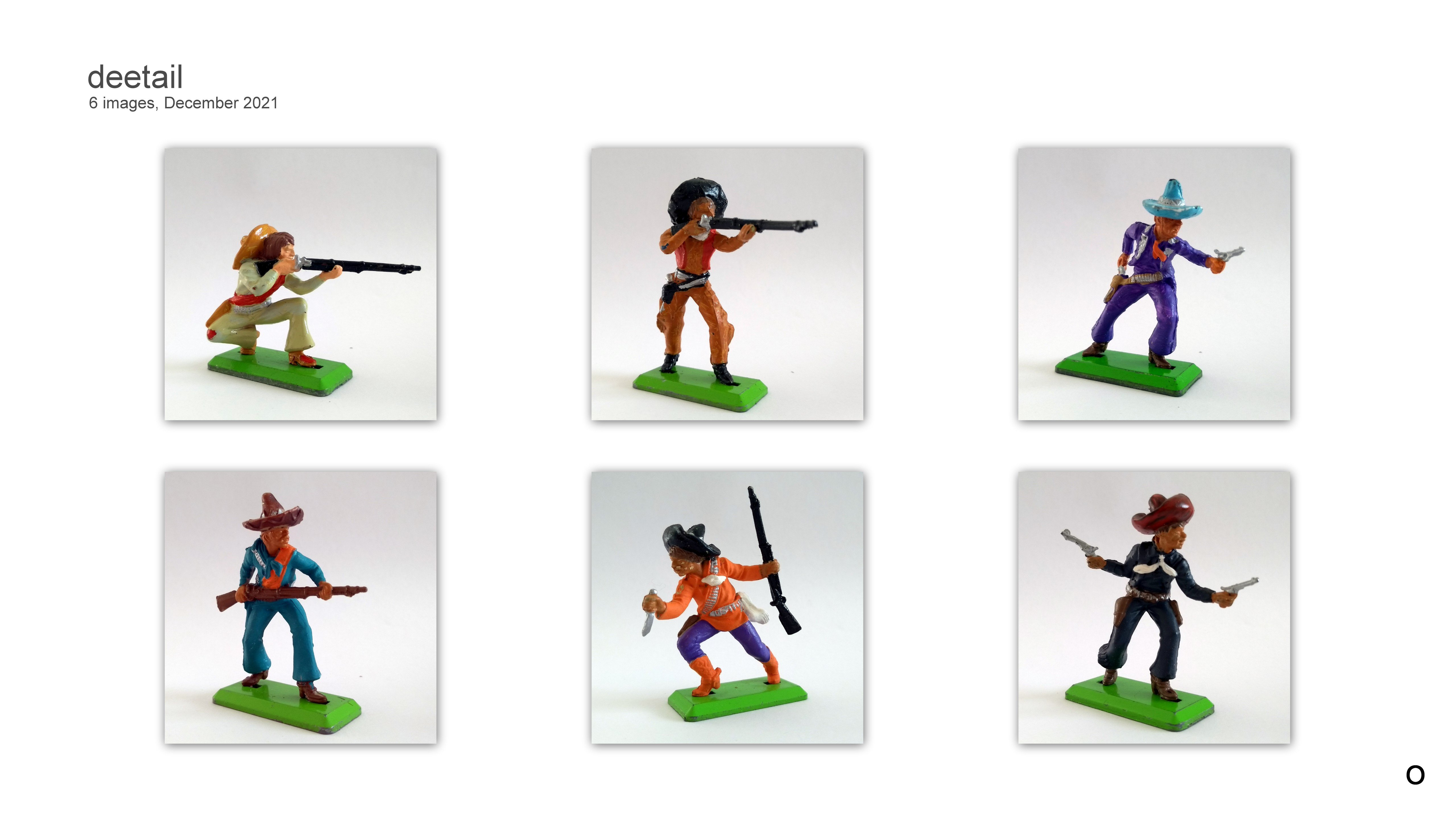
Britains Deetail - Mexicans

- 6 foot
- 6 mounted

==== Issued Sets ====
TBC

=== American Civil War ===
Figures depicting Federal (Union) and Confederate (Rebel) forces were produced from 1972-80 in foot and mounted types.

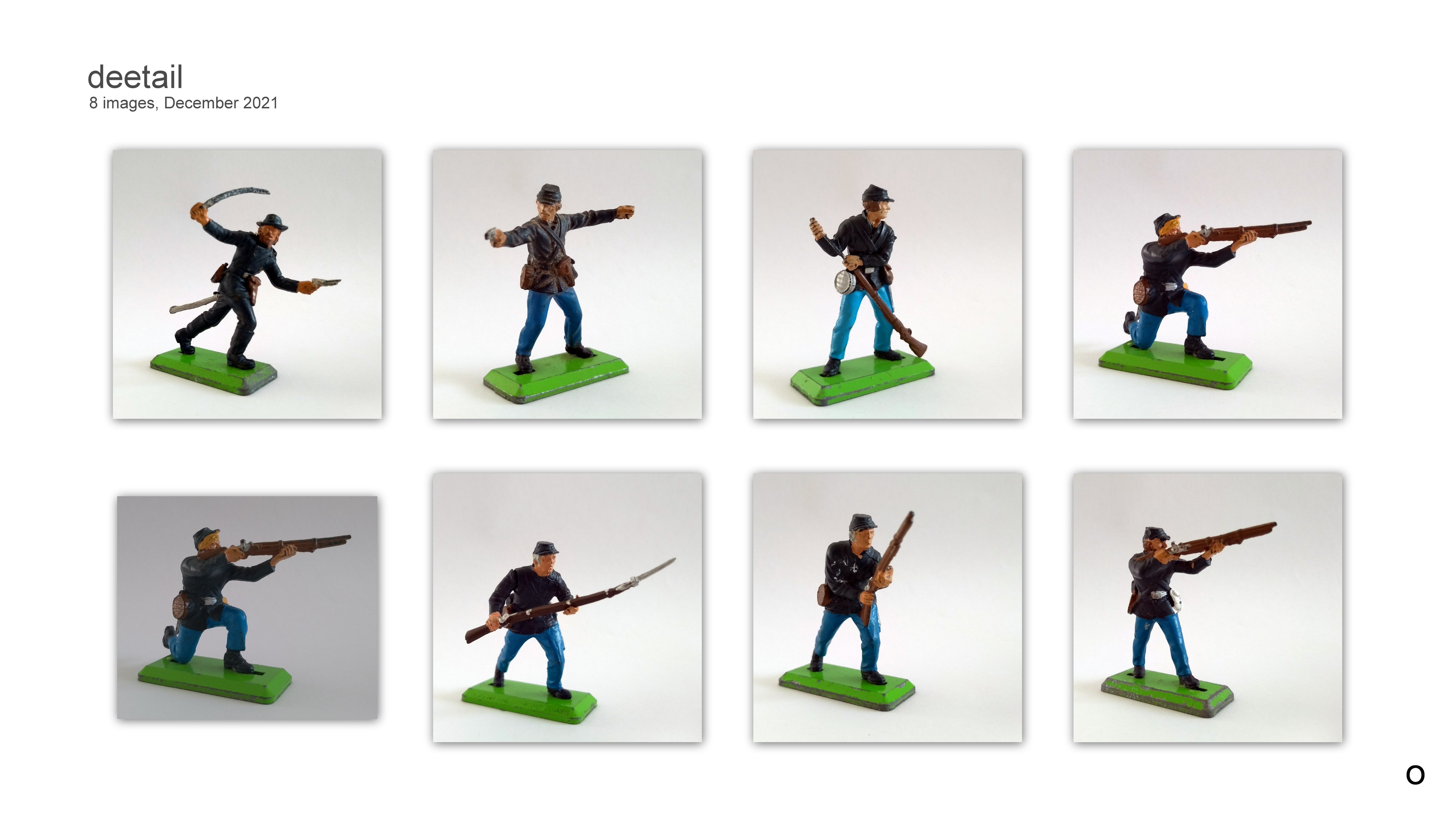
Britains Deetail Federal - O

==== Federal ====
- 6 Infantry standing shooting rifle; kneeling shooting rifle; advancing with rifle; standing loading rifle; officer with sword and pistol; NCO with flag and pistol
- 6 Cavalry
- Combat Weapons - Gatling gun set with 2 figures (officer and gunner) and ammunition

==== Confederate ====
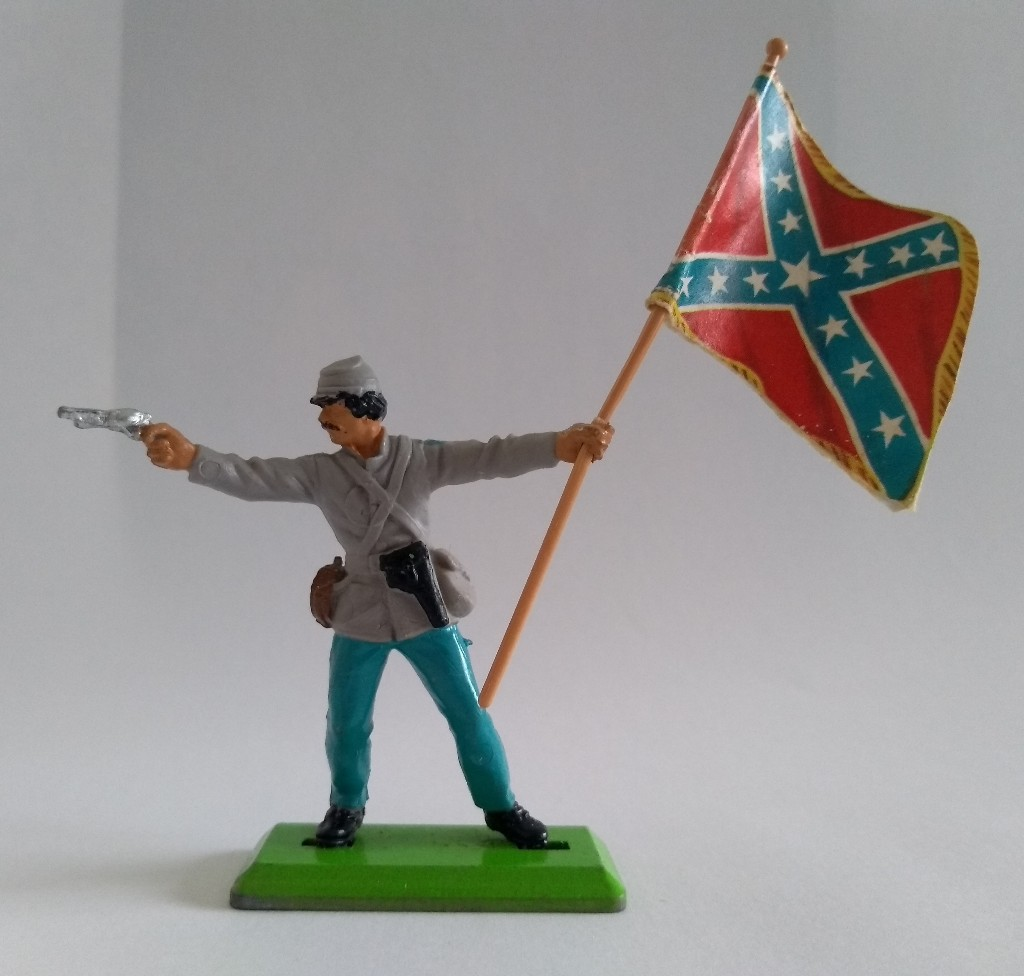
- Britains Deetail Confederate NCO with flag and pistol
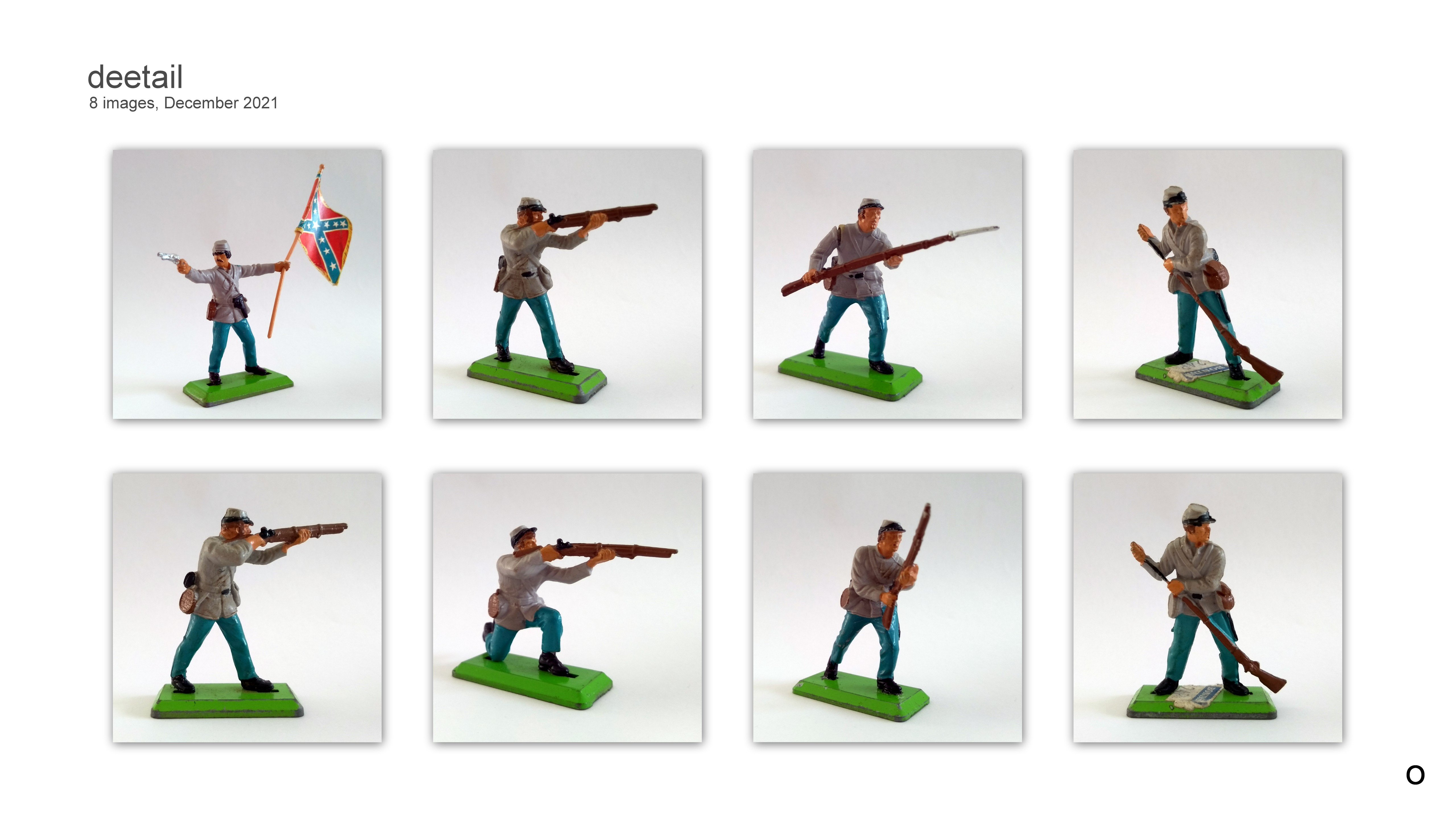
  Britains Deetail Confederate - O
  6 Infantry - standing shooting rifle; kneeling shooting rifle; advancing with rifle; standing loading rifle; officer with sword and pistol; NCO with flag and pistol
- 6 Cavalry
- Combat Weapons -Gatling gun set with 2 figures (officer and gunner) and ammunition

Figures for both types were exactly the same just molded and painted in different colours. Initial releases had longer rifles and plug-in arms, which were eventually discontinued and replaced with fully moulded figures.

==== Issued Sets ====
- 7440 Confederate retail counter box (48 pcs)
- 7450 Federal retail counter box (48 pcs)
- 7449 Union retail counter box (18 pcs mounted)
- 7439 Confederate retail counter box (18 pcs mounted)
- 7470 Union Gatling Gun retail counter box (12 pcs)
- 7460 Confederate Gatling Gun retail counter box (12 pcs)
- 7422 Confederate (5 pcs, 2 mounted)
- 7423 Confederate Patrol (4 pcs, 1 Gatling Gun)
- 7424 Confederate (6 pcs, 2 mounted)
- 7425 Confederate (6 pcs, 2 mounted)
- 7426 Confederate (7 pcs)
- 7426 Confederate (12 pcs 3 mounted)
- 7427 Confederate (6 pcs)
- 7428 Confederate (5 pcs, 2 mounted)
- 7452 Federal (5 pcs, 2 mounted)
- 7453 Federal Patrol (4 pcs, 1 Gatling Gun)
- 7454 Federal (6 pcs, 2 mounted)
- 7455 Federal (6 pcs, 2 mounted)
- 7456 Federal (7 pcs)
- 7456 Federal (12 pcs, 3 mounted)
- 7457 Federal (6 pcs)
- 7458 Federal (5 pcs, 2 mounted)
- 7462 Federal & Confederate (19 pcs, 6 mounted, 1 gatling gun)
- 7463 Federal & Confederate (12 pcs 3 mounted)
- 7466 Federal & Confederate Battle Set (9 pcs, 1 gatling gun)

=== Military ===
Figures depicting WWII American, German, British and Japanese forces were produced from 1971–89, with initial production of American and German figures only on brown/tan metal bases - eventually discontinued and replaced from 1974 with the standard green type. Figures were issued in the standard series of six pose types, except American and German figures which came in two separate series of six poses (12 in total) and included helmet decals in the form of red shield with black star (American) and shields with Imperial colours of red, white and black (German). Japanese, British 8th Army and German Afrika Korps were produced in limited quantities until production ceased in 1976 and 1979 respectively. Combat weapons sets and associated military vehicles also complimented the series.

==== American US WW2 ====
- 6 Infantry (1st series)
- 6 Infantry (2nd series)
- Combat Weapons
  - US recoilless rifle (75mm gun) set with 2 man crew (officer and gunner) and 12 plastic "shells" attached to a sprue
  - 105mm pack howitzer with shells
- Military vehicles
  - Willys Jeep with 2 man crew (driver and gunner with M83)
  - Helicopter with 2 man crew and casualty on stretcher, rotating blades and working winch
- Motorcycles
  - Motorcycle with dispatch rider

Issued Sets

- 7340 Retail counter box Infantry (48 pcs)
- 7334 Retail counter box Recoilless Rifle (12 pcs)
- 7343 Patrol (4 pcs, 1 gun)
- 7344 Infantry (6 pcs)
- 7347 Infantry (18 pcs)
- 7347 Infantry (7pcs)
- 9761 Hughes 300C Helicopter
- 9682 US Despatch Rider
- 9786 US Jeep

==== German Army WWII ====
- Infantry
  - 1st series (6 figures) - kneeling with MG42, charging with fixed bayonet, standing throwing grenade, standing firing rifle, advancing firing MP41, carrying a Panzerbüchse anti-tank gun and ammo box
  - 2nd series (6 figures, manufactured 1977-1989) - officer, radio operator, kneeling firing rifle, marching with rifle at slope, flamethrower, carrying Panzerbüchse anti-tank gun across body
- Combat Weapons
  - Mortar set with 2 man crew (1 loading, 1 firing) with 12 plastic "shells" attached to a sprue
  - Pak field gun with shells
- Military Vehicles
  - Kettenkrad half track with 2 man crew (driver and passenger)
  - Kubelwagen scout car with 2 man crew (driver and gunner firing MG40)
- Motorcycles
  - Motorcycle with dispatch rider
  - Motorcycle combination (motorbike and sidecar) with 2 man crew (rider and gunner firing MG40)

Both sets include a shouldered rifle which is attached to the riders back

Issued Sets

- 7380 Infantry retail counter box (48 pcs)
- 7333 Mortar retail counter box Mortar (12 pcs)
- 7343/2 Patrol (4 pcs, 1 mortar)
- 7348 British & German Battle Set (18 pcs)
- 7354 Infantry (6 pcs)
- 7356 Infantry (7 pcs)
- 7357 Infantry (18 pcs)
- 7386 Infantry (7pcs)
- 7385 Infantry (6 pcs)
- 9732 German Field Gun
- 9751 Army Group series - British & German (12 pcs)
- 9679 German Army Dispatch Rider
- 9681 German Army Combination
- 9788 Army Group series - German Scout Car and Gun (2 pcs)
- 9783 Kubelwagen (Scout Car)
- 9780 Kettenkrad Halftrack

==== Afrika Korps WW2 ====
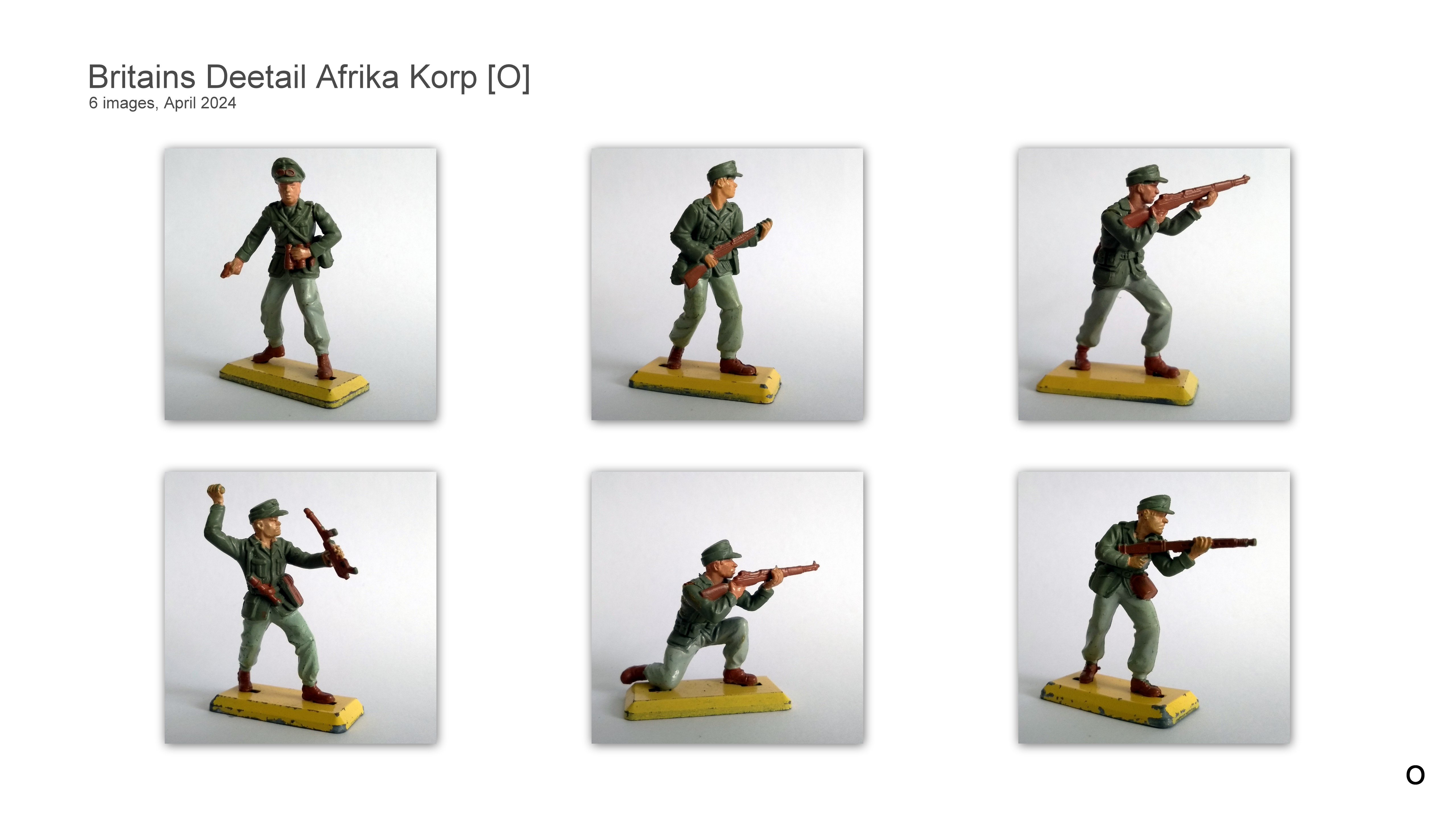
Britains Deetail Afrika Korp (O)

- 6 Infantry (manufactured 1973-76)
- Military Vehicles
  - Kubelwagen Scout Car with 2 man crew (driver and officer)
- Motorcycles
  - Motorcycle (BMW) with dispatch rider
  - Motorcycle combination (sidecar) with 2 man crew (rider and gunner firing MG40)

==== Issued Sets ====
- 7370 Retail counter box (48 pcs)
- 7375 (6 pcs)

==== British Army WW2 ====
- Infantry (manufactured 1973-89)

Initially produced with a stained/faded paint finish, TBC

- Combat Weapons
  - Mortar set with 2 man crew (1 loading, 1 firing) with 12 plastic "shells" attached to a sprue
  - 25 pdr gun with shells
  - BAT (Wombat anti tank gun) with shells
- Military Floating Models
  - Assault craft with 2 man crew
  - Submarine with 2 man crew (frogmen/divers)
- Military Vehicles
  - Short Wheel Base Military Land Rover with 2 man crew (driver & Bren gunner)
  - SWB Land Rover with driver and gunner 90 with Winch
- Motorcycles
  - Motorcycle (850cc Norton) with dispatch rider

==== Issued Sets ====
- 7342 Infantry retail counter box (48 pcs)
- 7338 Mortar retail counter box (12 pcs)
- 4302 2-Man Submarine
- 4312 Assault Craft
- 7341 Patrol (4 pcs, 1 Mortar)
- 7345 Infantry (6 pcs)
- 7346 Infantry (18 pcs)
- 7347 Infantry (7 pcs)
- 7348 British & German Battle Set (18 pcs)
- 9672 British Despatch Rider
- 9704 25 Pounder Gun
- 9720 British Anti-Tank Gun
- 9751 British & German (Army Group set 12 pcs)
- 9787 Army Land Rover and Gun (Army Group set 2 pcs)
- 9781 Scout Car
- 9782 Military Land Rover

==== Desert Rats 8th Army WW2 ====
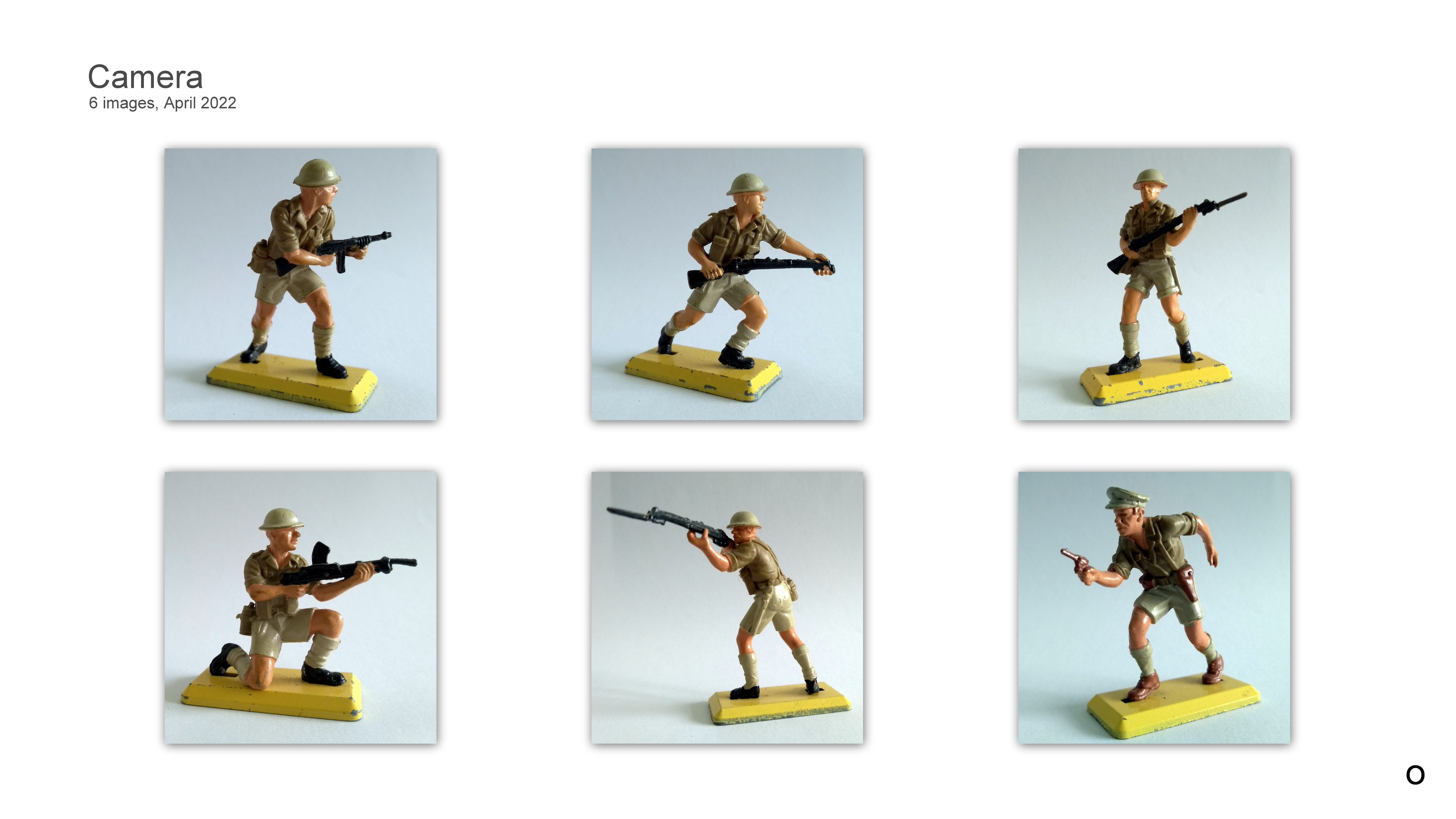
Britains Deetail - Desert Rats 8th Army

- 6 Infantry (manufactured 1973-76)
- Combat Weapons
  - Vickers MG with 2 man crew (1 loading, 1 firing) with ammunition
- Military Vehicles
  - Daimler scout car with 2 man crew

==== Issued Sets ====
- 7339 Vickers Gun retail counter box (12 pcs)
- 7395 Infantry (6 pcs)
- Patrol (4 pcs, 1 gun)

TBC

==== Imperial Japanese Army ====
- 6 Infantry (manufactured 1973-76)
- Combat Weapons
  - 75mm recoilless rifle set with 2 man crew (officer and gunner) with 12 plastic "shells" attached to a sprue

==== Issued Sets ====
- 7355 Infantry (6 pcs)
- 7353 Patrol (4 pcs, 1 gun)

TBC

==== Accessories ====
- 4715 Battleground Playset
- 4731 Bombed Buildings Set (Army Group set)
- 9791 Plastic shells (for use with guns 9704/9720/9732)
- Plastic shell sprue (for use with combat weapons (7333/7334/7438)
- 88 Britains Deetail Point of Sale poster on thick card in colour. Depicts the range of dismounted figures and mounted.

==== Super Deetail ====
Super Deetail figures initially featured as a prototype set of six modern British paratroopers at a 1978 London toy fair. The new moulds allowed finer details compared to Deetail range, however four of the six figures never made it into widescale production due to manufacturing difficulties with the new over-moulding process. A set of four were eventually released to the market in 1980 - firing rifle, firing bazooka, throwing grenade and an officer firing pistol. Rather than a particular historical context, they were modelled upon modern style British armed forces - Paratroopers (red berets, green bases), Commandos (green berets, light blue bases) and SAS (grey berets, grey bases).

Issued Sets

- 6330 SAS Retail Counter Box (48 pcs)
- 6300 Paratroopers Retail Counter Box (48 pcs)
- 6320 Marine Commandos Retail Counter Box (48 pcs)
- 6303 Paratroopers bubble pack (3 pcs)
- 6314 Paratroopers (6 pcs)
- 6336 Marine Commandos (6 pcs)

==== Guards ====
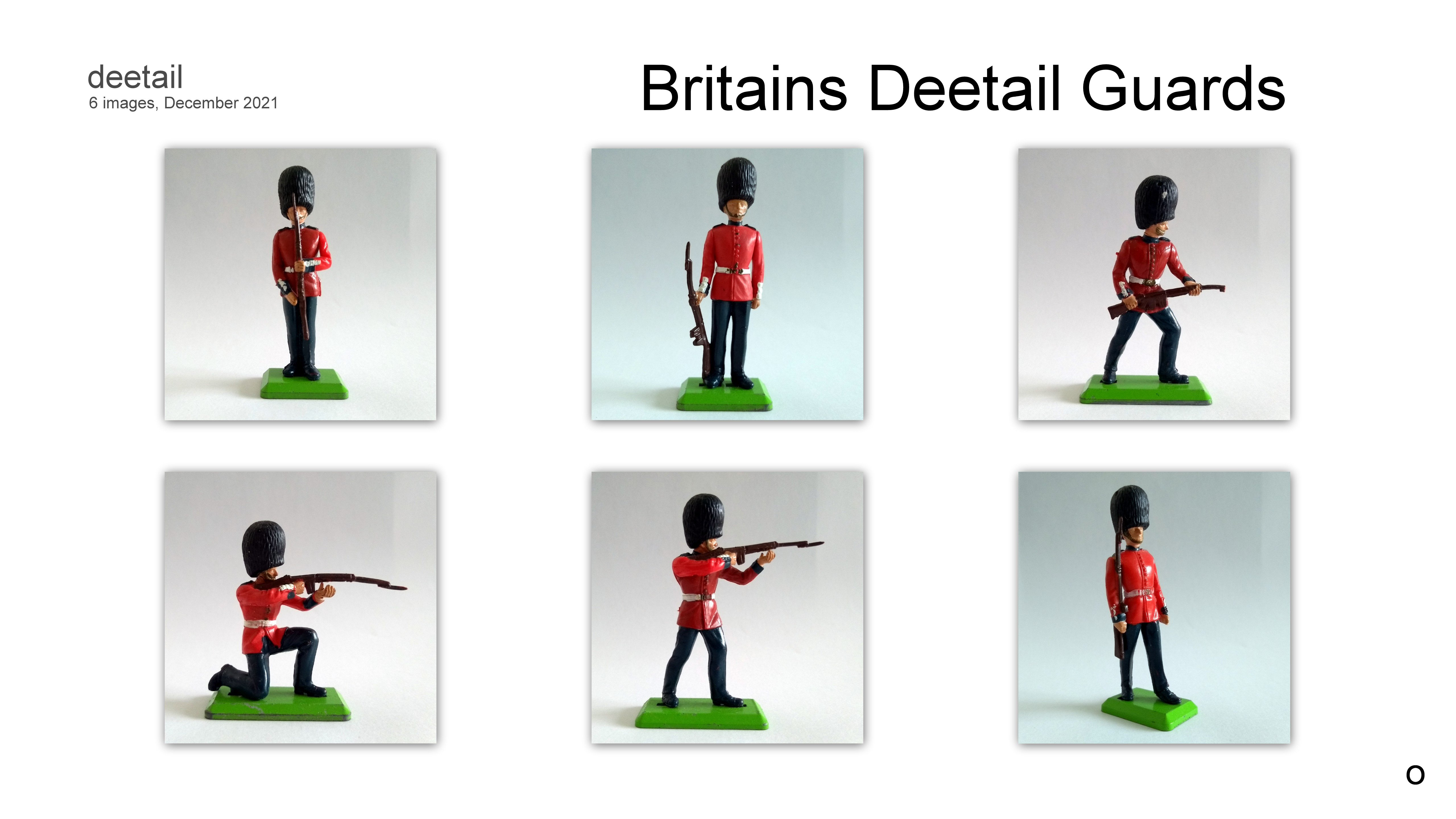
- Britains Deetail Guards Set Foot
  7250 Scots Guards retail counter box (48 pcs)
- 7256 Scots Guards (6 pcs)
- 7223 New Metal Miniatures - Life Guards, Scots Guards, Yeoman (6 pcs)
- 299 Sentry box

==== Task Force ====
The Task Force range was introduced 1995/96 using the US and British WW2 Deetail moulds, but finished with different colour schemes.

=== Space ===
The Space range was launched in 1981 and ran until 1985 including Stargard Commandos, Cyborg, Assault Squad, Aliens and Mutants along with various spacecraft and accessories.

=== Other ===
- Farm

Britains most extensive range including vehicles, figures, buildings and animals.

- Police
- Motorcycles
- Riding
- Wildlife
- Hospital
- Robin Hood
- Karate

== Now ==
W. Britains remains the market leader in "toy soldiers" producing high quality hollowcast metal figures as well as a smaller range of hand painted plastic figures, which were reintroduced in 2006 as "Super Detail Plastics" which contain many attributes of the Deetail range first released in the 1970s . In 2016 W. Britains was sold to The Good Soldier LLC, located in Holland, Ohio, USA.

Certain figures using the original Deetail moulds (French Foreign Legion, Afrika Korps, British 8th Army, Arabs, etc.) are now manufactured in Argentina.

Vintage detail figures with metal bases remain highly popular with collectors and on secondary markets/internet auction sites often sell for - foot/infantry (£1-£5); mounted (£5-£20); full sets of 6 (£15-100); combat weapons (£5-40); and military vehicles (£15-100) all dependent upon condition.

=== Rarities ===
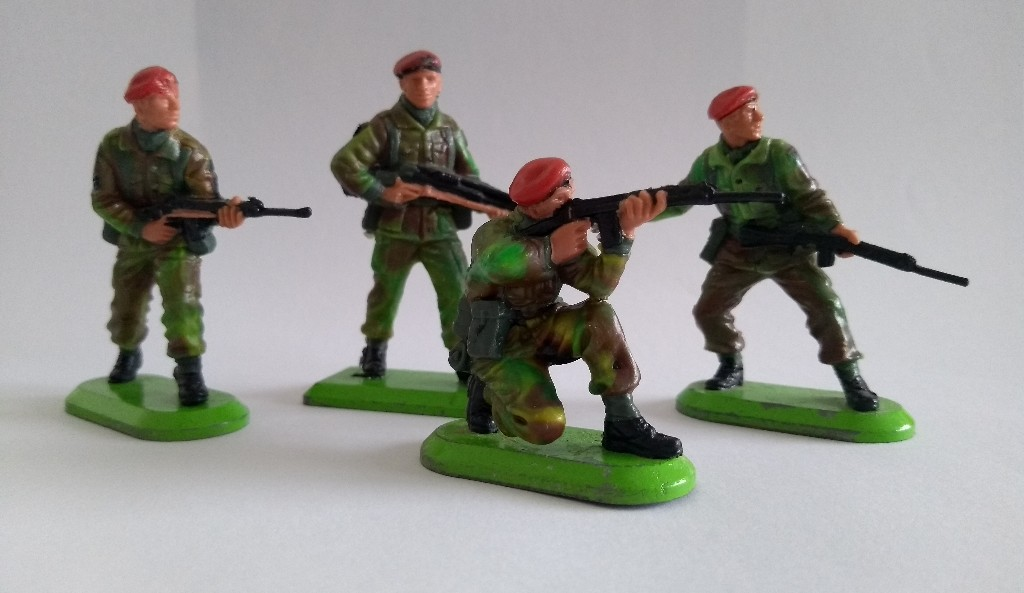
Super Deetail Paratroopers Holy Grail Set (Note: soldier holding rifle low at rear has wrong base, but the figure is correct)

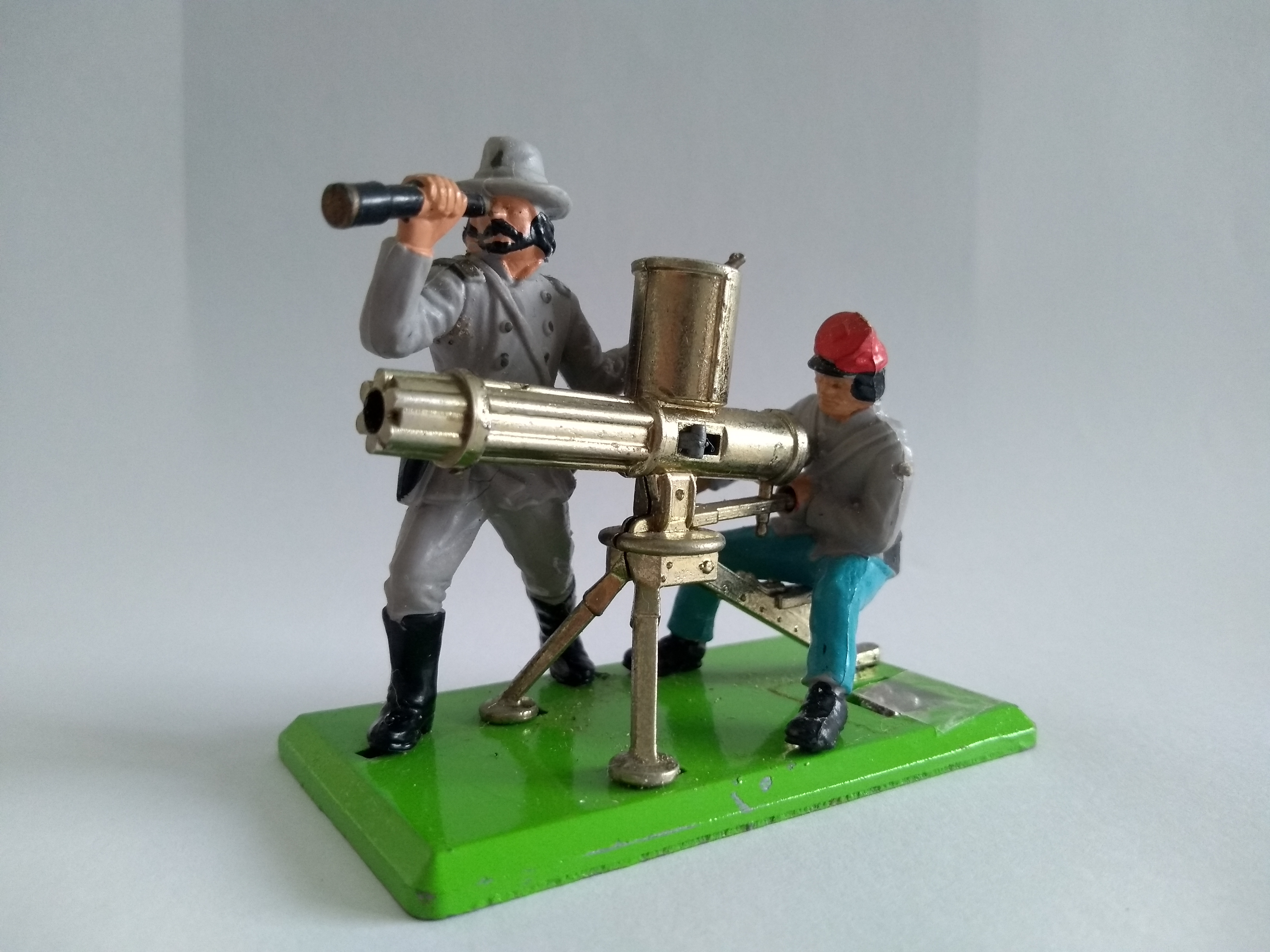
Federal Gatling Gun Set

Sought after items such as ACW and FFL Gatling gun sets; British 8th Army Vickers gun; Mexican and Apache warriors; WW2 Afrika Korps; Waterloo series and most mounted figures often reach the top end of estimates. Retail counter boxes are particularly rare (£150-£250) and demand is very strong for any items with original packaging (£50-£250), particularly the larger play sets.

Collectors "Holy Grail" include the four Super Deetail paratroopers, which were discontinued due to production issues. It is rumoured only a few thousand made it to retail. First issue American Infantry released with red bases in very limited quantities are also highly prized.
