= Philip Rosenthal (disambiguation) =

Philip Rosenthal (born 1960) is an American television writer and producer.

Philip or Phil Rosenthal may also refer to:

- Phil Rosenthal (columnist) (born 1963), American media columnist
- Phil Rosenthal, a member of the American bluegrass group The Seldom Scene
- Philip Rosenthal (industrialist) (1916–2001), German entrepreneur and politician
- Philipp Rosenthal (1855–1937), German entrepreneur
