= Porzellanikon =

- Location: Selb and Hohenberg an der Eger, Germany
- Type: Ceramic Art Museum
- Website: porzellanikon.org

The Porzellanikon is a museum complex dealing with the production of porcelain and ceramics in Selb and Hohenberg an der Eger in the district of Wunsiedel i. Fichtelgebirge (Oberfranken) in Germany. The complex of museums was the result of the merger of the European Industrial Museum for Porcelain, the European Museum of Technical Ceramics, the Rosenthal Museum and the German Porcelain Museum in Hohenberg an der Eger. Since 2012, the Porzellanikon has been included in the European Route of Ceramics as a member of the "UNIC" ("Urban Network for Innovation in Ceramics").

The museum was developed under founding director Wilhelm Siemen beginning in 1984 and expanded over several decades. It includes the restored former Rosenthal factory in Selb, which Siemen helped incorporate into the museum. In 2014, Porzellanikon was designated a state museum of Bavaria.

== Selb locations ==
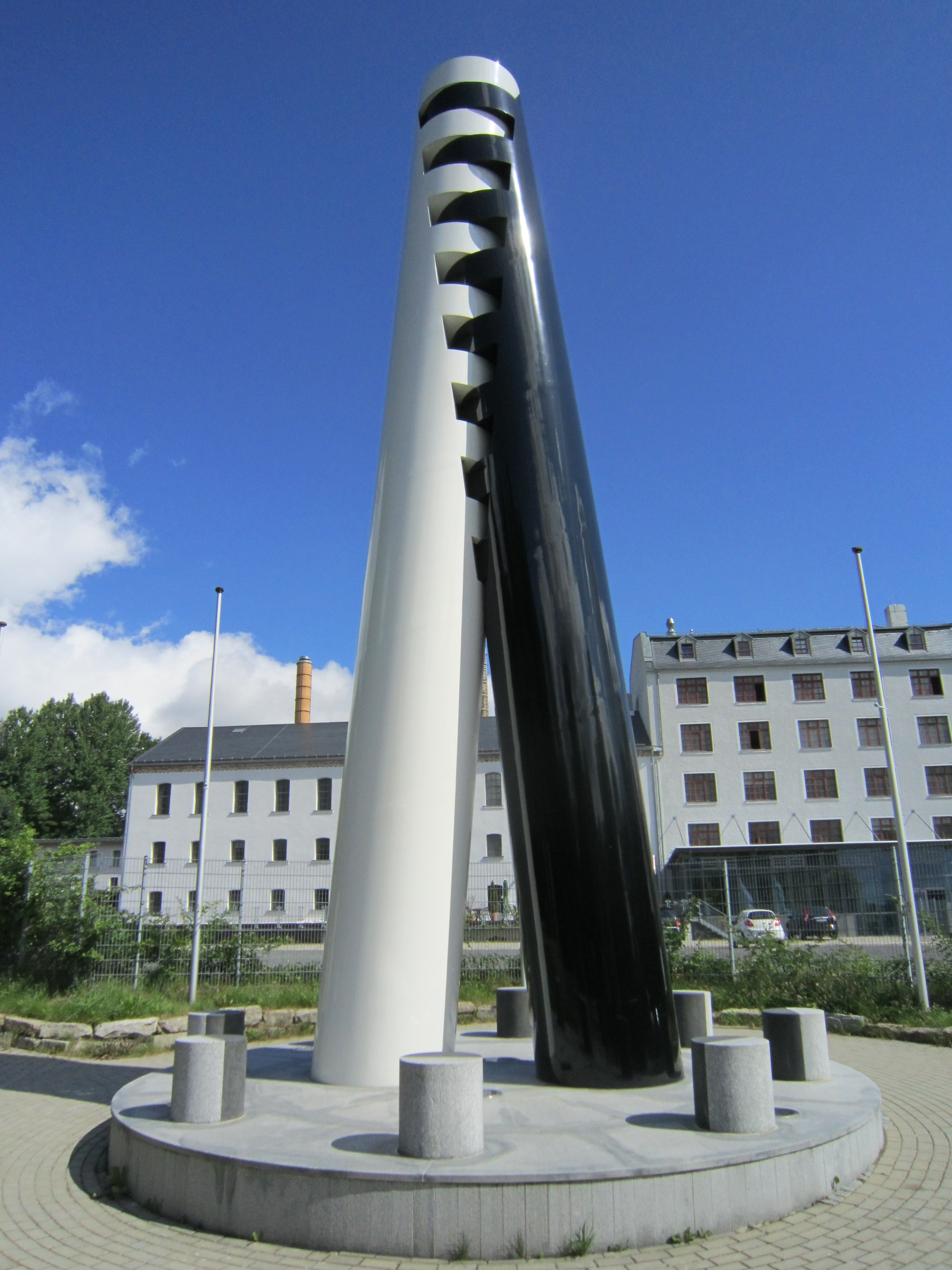
Porzellanikon – Selb

The city of Selb is considered the center of the German porcelain industry. The porcelain manufacturers located in Selb and the surrounding area are market leaders in the field of tableware porcelain. The museum complex of Porzellanikon Selb is composed of three museums. The European Industrial Museum of Porcelain shows the manufacture of porcelain. The European Museum of Technical Ceramics deals with the use of ceramics in the fields of medicine, electrical engineering and aerospace. The Rosenthal Museum documents the product and design history of Rosenthal AG, a manufacturer of porcelain and other household products.

=== European Industrial Museum for Porcelain ===
The European Industrial Museum for Porcelain is located on the former factory premises of Rosenthal AG in Selb-Plößberg (Bavaria). Founded in 1866, the factory is now a recognized industrial monument. The museum shows the development of porcelain production in a factory and the conditions from the beginning of the production of ceramics to the present including original workplaces. It is an anchor point of the European Route of Industrial Heritage (ERIH).

The museum shows how crockery was made from the porcelain raw materials over the last centuries. Screens show the inner life of complex machines and make their functioning understandable. The use of special software enables the experimental design of three-dimensional porcelain objects. Touchscreen applications can be used to answer further questions. The museum also addresses social issues.

=== European Museum of Technical Ceramics ===
The European Museum of Technical Ceramics was opened on 10 October 2005 as part of Porzellanikon Selb. It is the first museum in Europe dedicated to high-performance ceramics. Numerous manufacturers of technical ceramics and the Association of the Ceramic Industry (Selb) participated in its development.

For the first time, technical ceramics were used in the form of dentures at the time of the French Revolution. Under Frederick the Great the acid resistance of porcelain was used for laboratory and pharmacy equipment. In 1849 the first ceramic bell insulator was used on the telegraph route between Frankfurt and Berlin. In 1891, porcelain insulators were presented for the first time at the International Electrotechnical Exhibition in Frankfurt. The advancement of the technology brought other applications for technical ceramics.

Today, technical ceramics can also be found in everyday objects such as lighters, mobile phones, espresso machines or cars, since the material is heat-resistant, durable and hard. Ceramic blades cut diamonds, for example.

=== Rosenthal Museum ===
With the Rosenthal Museum, Rosenthal AG returned to its old factory site on the occasion of its 125th anniversary. The museum is housed in the old kiln of the former factory. Originally built in 1889, the building burnt down in 1982 to the outer walls. The reconstruction took the idea of an "open space concept" into account. Of the original three consecutive round ovens, the front one was completely renovated.

The museum shows the history of the company and its products in various themed islands, which began on 30 August 1879 at Schloss Erkersreuth with Philipp Rosenthal's porcelain painting. In 1917, Rosenthal acquired the porcelain factory founded by Jacob Zeidler in Selb-Plößberg in 1866. The company used the factories until they moved their production to Rotbühl in 1969.

As a manufacturer of living and lifestyle products, Rosenthal used an early connection between art, architecture, design, porcelain and other materials. Based on the designs of Rosenthal's product designers such as Walter Gropius, Elsa Fischer-Treyden and Bjørn Wiinblad. The company was able to win internationally renowned artists to design ceramic wares, including Salvador Dalí, Friedensreich Hundertwasser and Niki de Saint Phalle.

In 2009, the Rosenthal collection of the insolvent porcelain manufacturer Rosenthal was bought by the State Supervision Foundation, including the originals of Salvador Dalí and Andy Warhol. The foundation left the remains of the manufacturing plant to the Porcelain Museum.

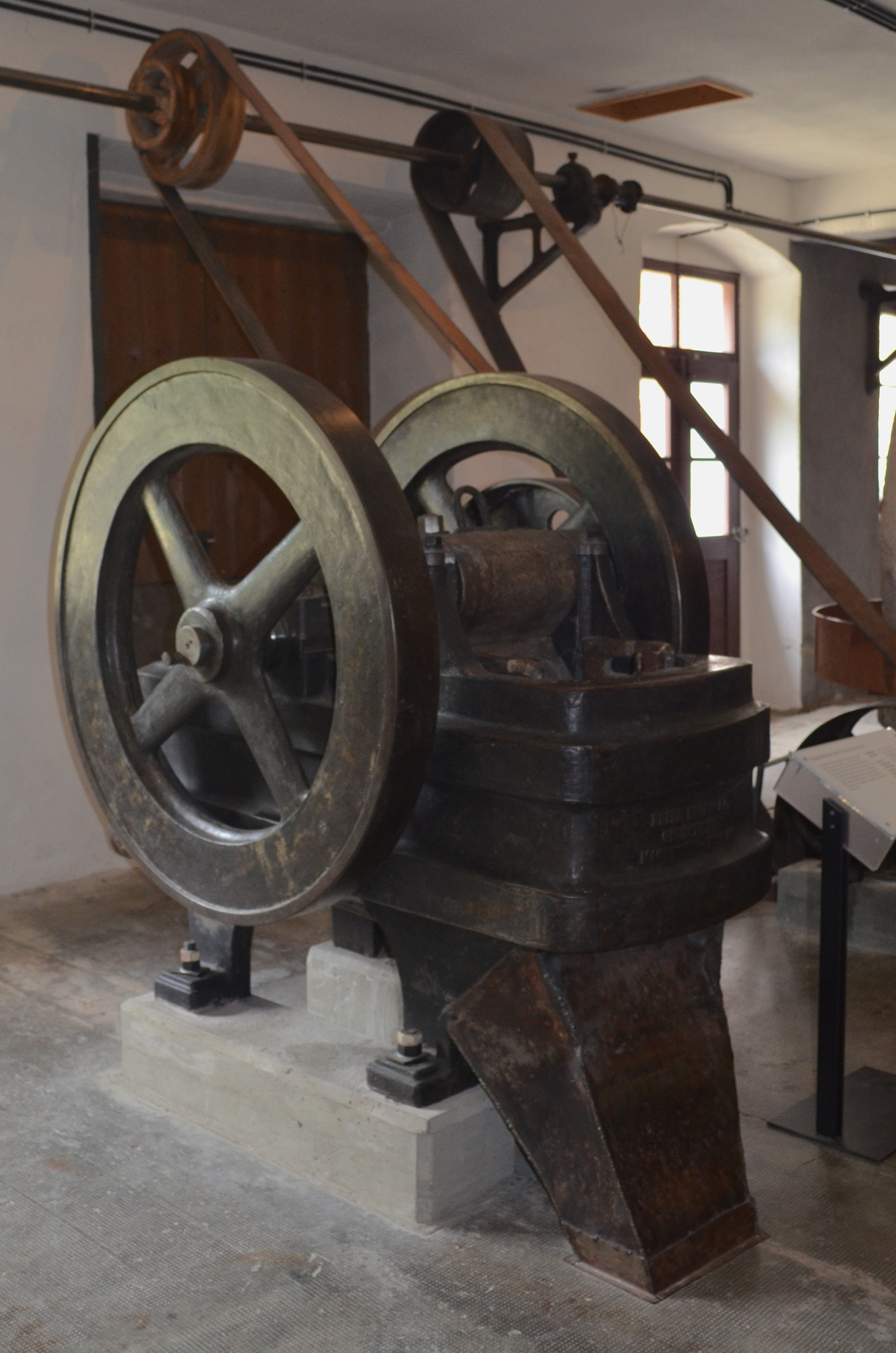
Bachenbrecher.

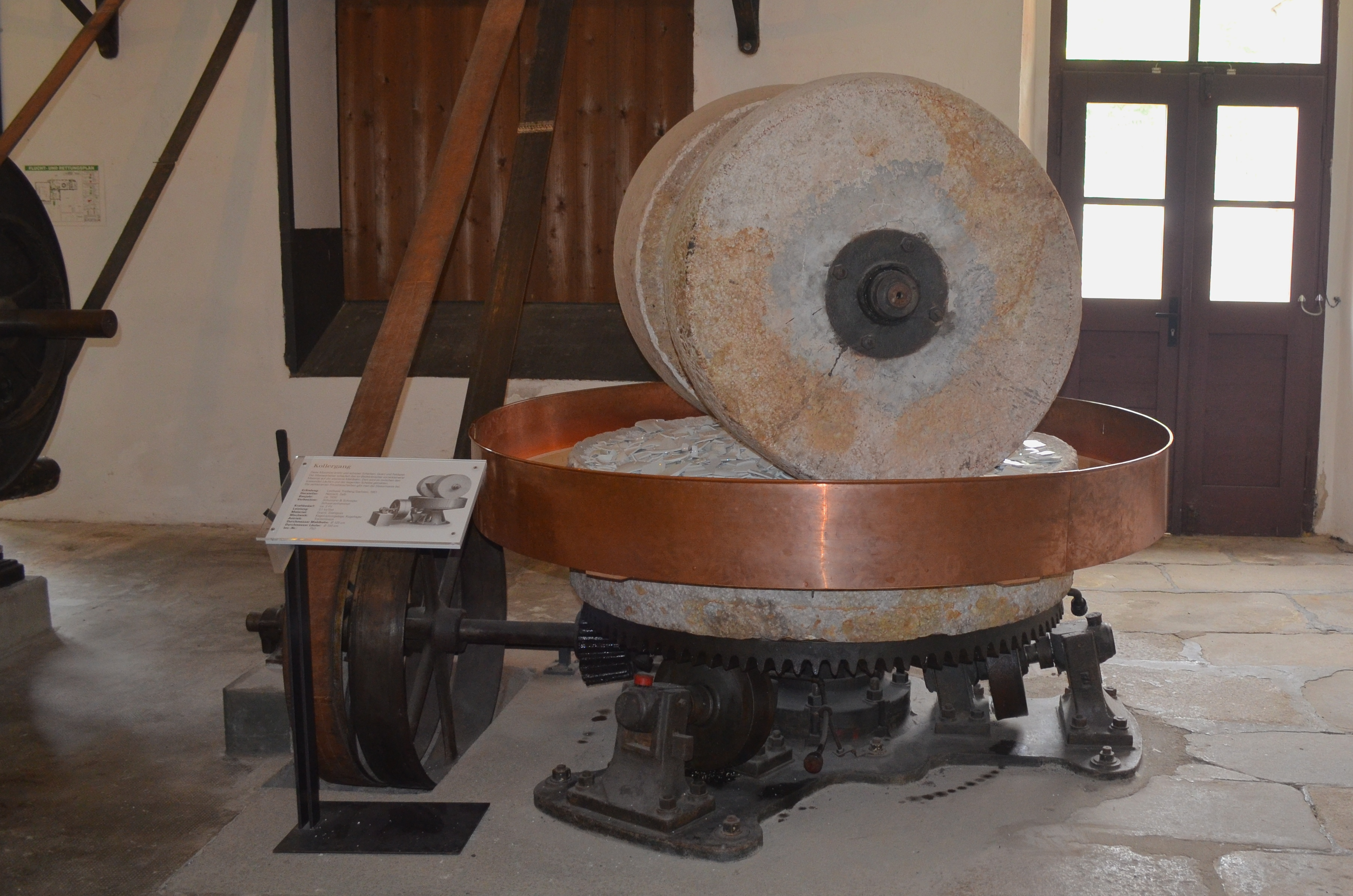
Kollergang.

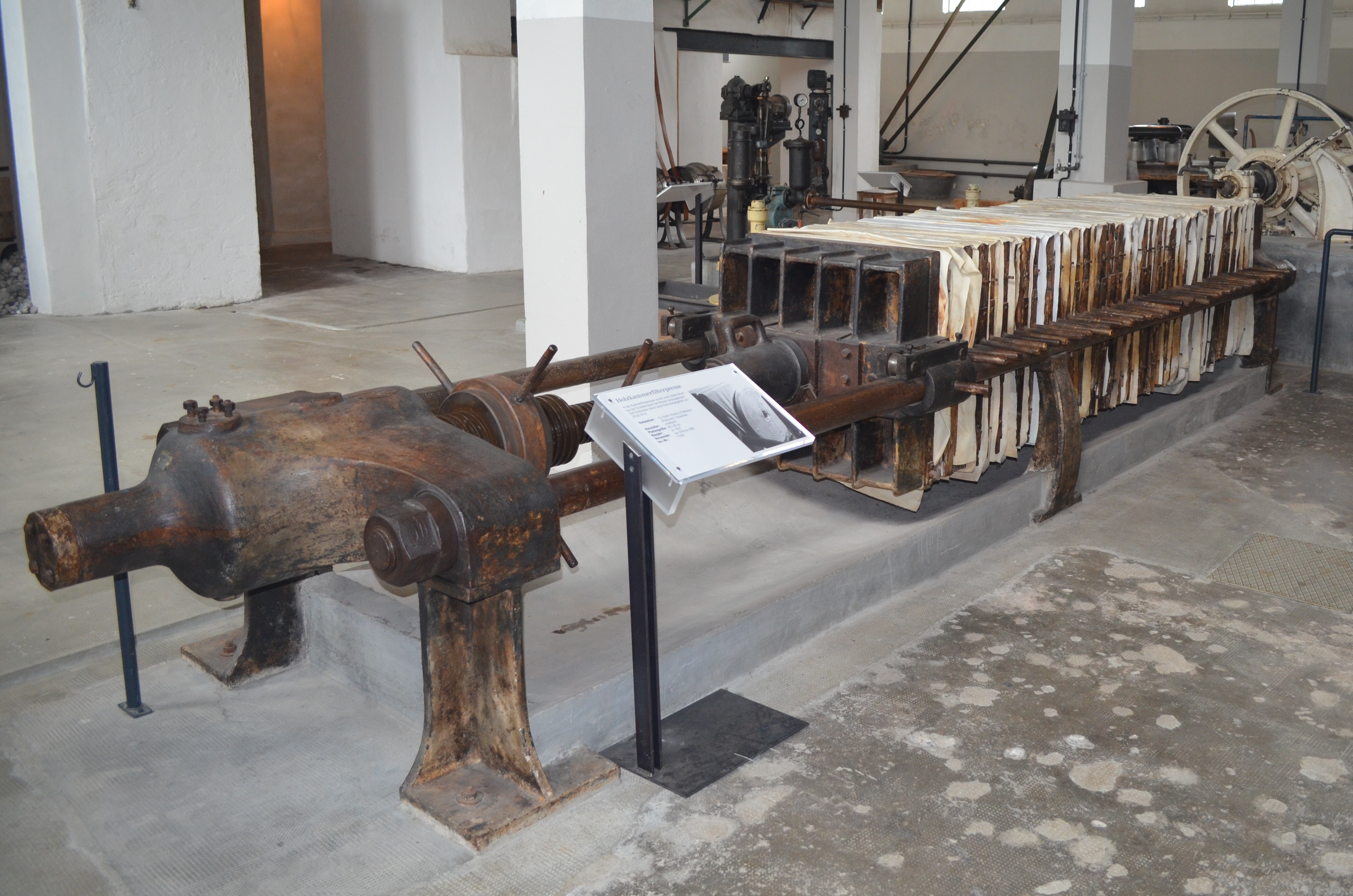
Holzkammerfilterpresse.

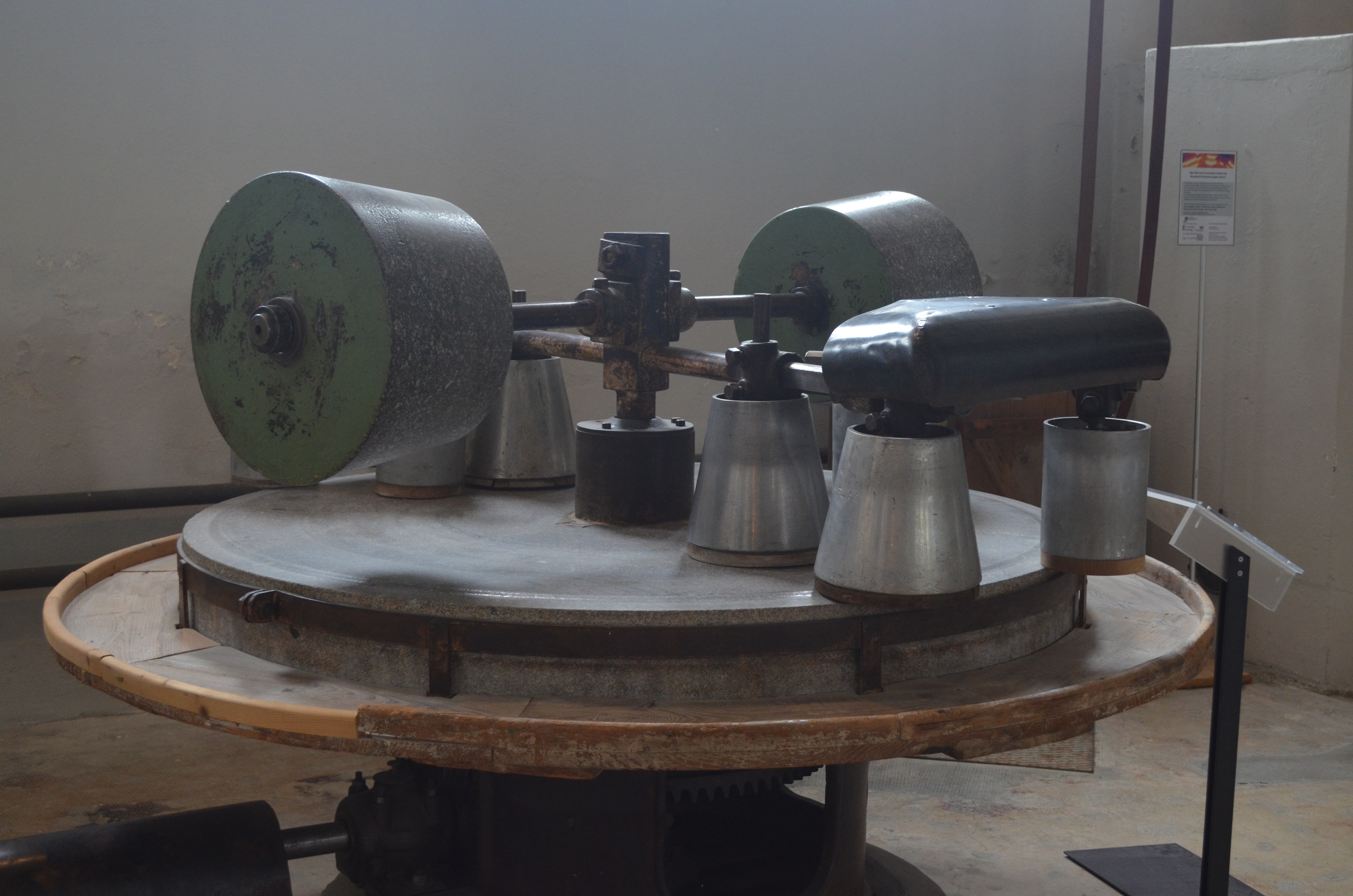
Masseschlagmaschine.

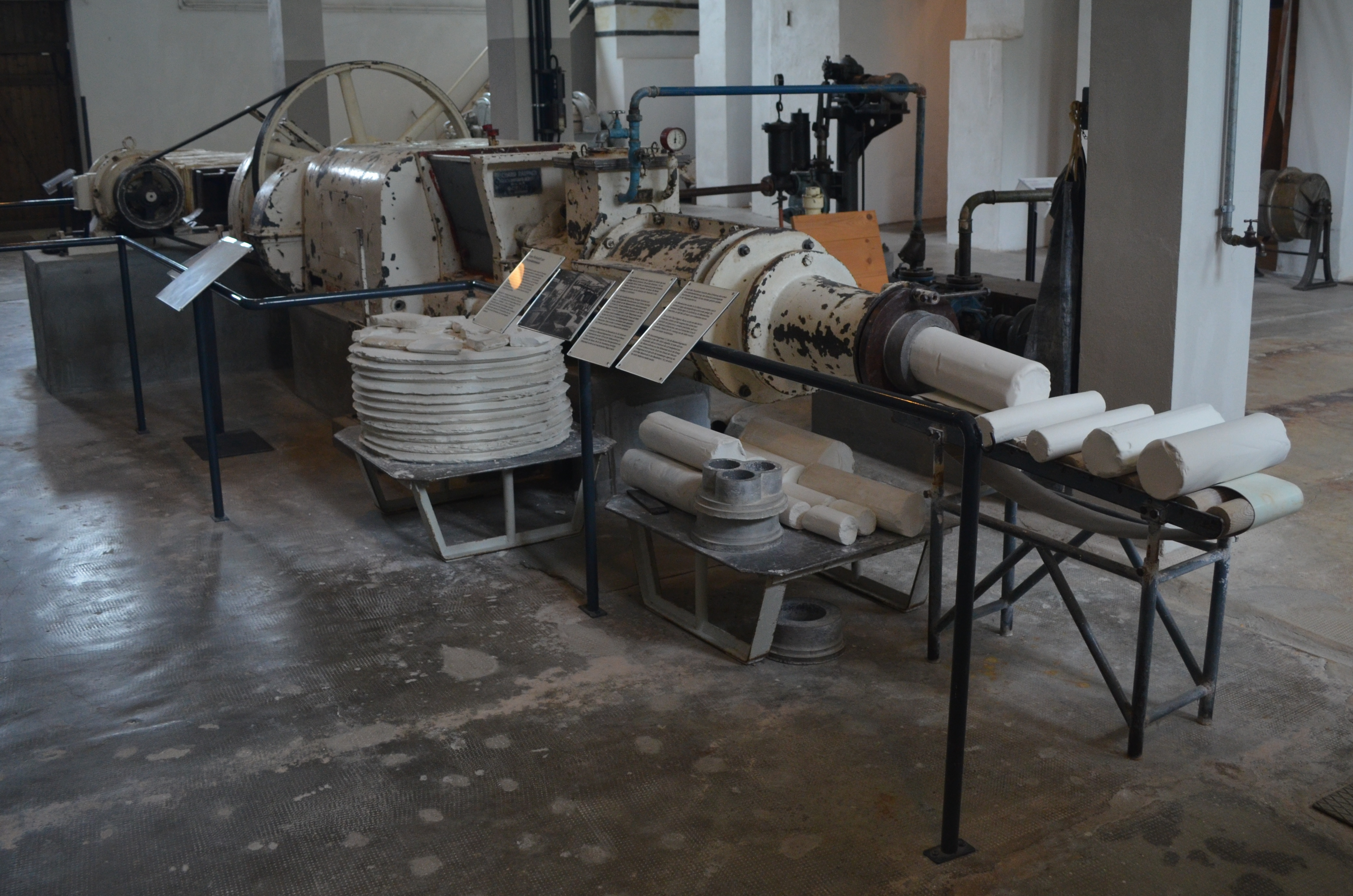
Vakuumstrangpresse.

== Hohenberg an der Eger location ==
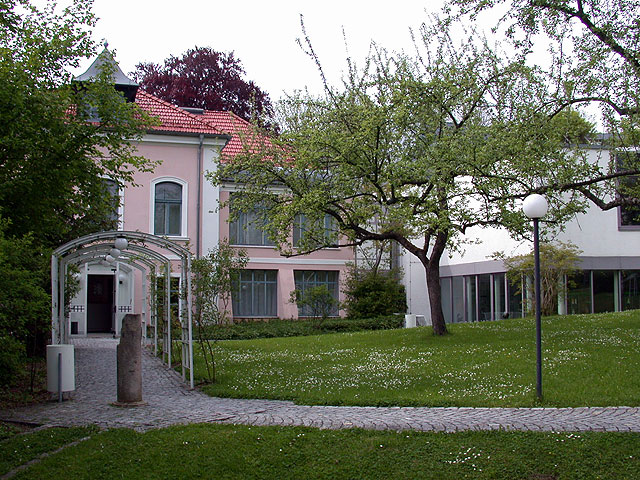
Porzellanikon – Hohenberg

The German Porcelain Museum was opened in Hohenberg on the Eger in 1982. Previously, the complex had served as the home of the family's company Hutschenreuther founded by Carolus Magnus Hutschenreuther. With the foundation of the first porcelain factory in northeast Bavaria in 1814 Hutschenreuther had laid the foundations in Hohenberg for the region to quickly become the center of the German porcelain industry. In 1995, the historical house was extended by a modern extension of glass and steel to 2000 m^{2}. Today, the museum shows some 12,000 exhibits, more than 150,000 parts are in the depot.

The permanent exhibition shows porcelain products from China as well as all kinds of porcelain produced in the German-speaking world, both precious individual products for noblemen as well as industrial products. The tour is chronological. In each room the visitor is shown features of a Kunstepoche. In front of the buildings is the former factory garden with apple trees and rose leaves.

== Exhibitions ==
- 2016: Rosenthal - a myth. Two men write history. Porzellanikon, Hohenberg an der Eger and Selb.

== See also ==
- Porcelain museum of Klášterec nad Ohří (formerly Klösterle an der Eger)
- Walküre Porcelain Museum (Bayreuth)
