= Philipp Rosenthal =

German designer and industrialist

- Born: 6 March 1855; Werl, Principality of Lippe
- Died: 30 March 1937 (aged 82); Bonn, Germany
- Occupation: Industrialist
- Known for: Rosenthal AG

Philipp Rosenthal (6 March 1855 – 30 March 1937) was a German designer and industrialist of Jewish descent. Rosenthal founded the company Philipp Rosenthal & Co. AG in 1897 for the production of ceramic wares.

== Biography ==
Philipp Rosenthal was born on 6 March 1855 in Werl, present-day North Rhine-Westphalia, Germany. He was born to a German Jewish family, the son of the porcelain merchant Abraham Rosenthal and Emilie Rosenthal (born Meyer).

Rosenthal company logo

Rosenthal was educated in his father's company and went to the US at the age of 18, where he became the porcelain buyer of the Detroit-based porcelain import company Jacob Meyer Brothers. On his business trips looking for painted porcelain, he realized painted porcelain was a scarce commodity. So he decided in 1879 to return to Germany and open a porcelain painting shop. He started with two painters in Erkersreuth Castle using white porcelain from the porcelain factory Lorenz Hutschenreuther in neighboring Selb . The unexpected breakthrough, however, succeeded commercially with the ashtray "little resting place for burning cigars". After a short time, Rosenthal employed 60 employees, moved the company to Selb, and opened its own porcelain factory there in 1889. Rosenthal expanded the company through new start-ups and acquisitions and converted it into Philipp Rosenthal & Co. AG in 1897. In 1916, Rosenthal introduced the eight- and twelve-sided dodecagon porcelain dinnerware set "Maria," which Rosenthal named after his second wife, Maria Franck, who was the daughter of the royal lawyer Josef Frank. She had divorced Frank in 1916 in order to be able to marry Rosenthal, who was much older. Rosenthal had two sons from his marriage to Maria, Philip Rosenthal and step-son Udo Franck-Rosenthal.

With the rise of Hitler during the 1930s ushering in the (Nazi) era, many harsh penalties and discriminatory laws targeting Jews were enacted by the Nazi German regime, these anti-Jewish discriminatory actions by the German government of the time culminated in the Holocaust, in which over 6,000,000 Jewish people were killed by the Nazis and their supporters. As Rosenthal was Jewish, he was ousted from the company he had founded in accordance with the German laws at the time which expropriated all Jewish companies and a property into the hands of the German Nazi elite. Rosenthal was forced to resign the presidency in 1934 due to his Jewishness. Soon, fostered by family quirks, an opportunity presented itself to Rosenthal more inconspicuously. On the one hand, the daughters of the first marriage, Klara and Anna, feared that they would be too short in the event of emancipation. Rosenthal, on the other hand, gave his step-son extraordinary powers, and intended to employ him as the guardian of his interests. The sons of Rosenthal's daughter Anna then applied to the court to divorce her grandfather. The members of the Board of Management joined the motion when Rosenthal asked them to take over his position on the board. In 1936, Rosenthal was incapacitated and placed under guardianship. However, in order to be able to annul long-term, binding resolutions of the dethroned Director General, Rosenthal's opponents from the head of the Munich Psychiatric and Nervous Clinic prepared a negative opinion. On 15 February 1937 Rosenthal became incapable of dealing with the situation as a result of severe changes in the age of the brain, which had been altered by changes in the arteries of the brain. Rosenthal died on 30 March 1937 in Bonn.

In 1950, his son Philip Rosenthal joined Rosenthal AG after his exile in England. The company achieved international importance through its porcelain designed by modern artists such as Henry Moore, Friedensreich Hundertwasser, Salvador Dalí, Ernst Fuchs and Helmut Andreas Paul Grieshaber.

== Exhibitions ==
- 2016: Rosenthal-a myth. Two men write history. Porzellanikon, Hohenberg on the Eger and Selb).

== Literature ==
- Wolfgang Schilling (2005). "Rosenthal, Philipp". Neue Deutsche Biographie (in German). Vol. 22. Berlin: Duncker & Humblot. pp. 79–80. (full text online).
- Hermann Schreiber u.a.: Die Rosenthal Story, Düsseldorf und Wien 1980.
- Jürgen Lillteicher: Die Rückerstattung jüdischen Eigentums in Westdeutschland nach dem Zweiten Weltkrieg. Eine Studie über Verfolgungserfahrung, Rechtsstaatlichkeit und Vergangenheitspolitik 1945–1971. Inaugural-Dissertation, Albert-Ludwigs-Universität Freiburg 2002/03.
