= Albert Caasmann =

German sculptor (1886–1968)

- Born: 2 June 1886; Berlin, Germany
- Died: 23 March 1968 (aged 81); Brandenburg, East Germany
- Known for: Ceramic artist, sculptor

Albert Caasmann (2 June 1886 – 23 March 1968) was a German sculptor and porcelain artist. Caasmann designed toy figures for the Berlin toy company Lineol and from 1919 to 1952 was the lead designer and production manager for the company. He designed figurines for the porcelain companies Rosenthal AG and Volkstedt. Caasmann's work for the company Rosenthal are exhibited in the Porzellanikon's Rosenthal Museum. Lineol toy figures modeled by Caasmann are in the Historical Toy Museum in Freinsheim and the Toy museum in Havelland.

== Biography ==
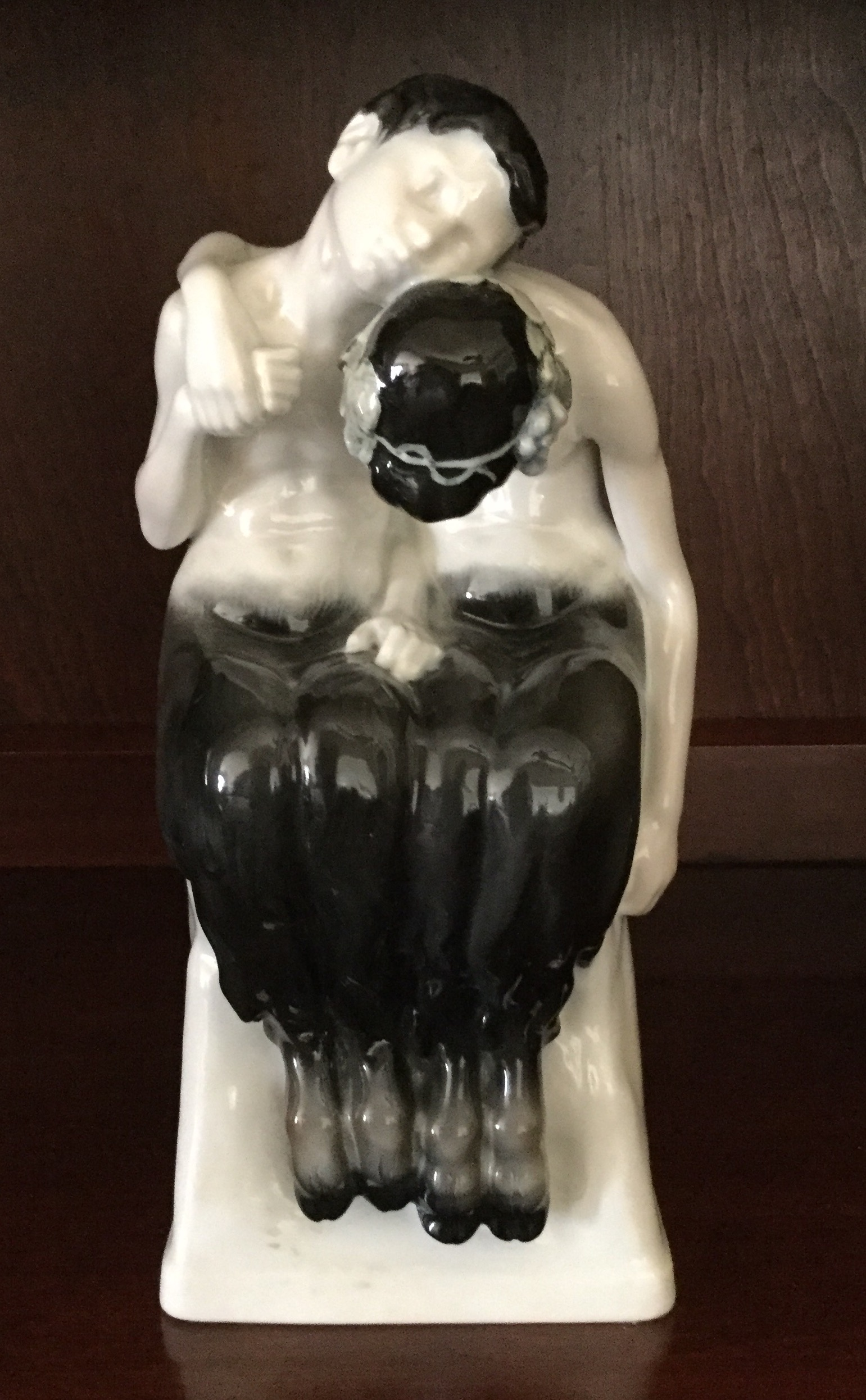
Porcelain Sleeping Faune figurine modeled by Albert Caasmann, produced by Rosenthal AG, c. 1920s.

Albert Caasmann was born on 2 June 1886 in Berlin, Germany. From 1909 to 1919, he worked as a freelancer for the Berlin toy company Lineol, founded by Oskar Wiederholz in 1906. After service as a soldier in the First World War, he became the leading designer and production manager of Lineol from 1919 to 1952. He designed over 600 figures for Lineol, including soldiers, animals, Indians, knights, fairy figures, and railroad figures. His toy figures were widely used in the region by children. Lineol ceased operations in 1965, and in 1985 the company Lineol Duscha has the trademark rights to Lineol. Lineol Duscha reproduces Lineol figures modeled before 1945. Lineol toy figures modeled by Caasmann are in the Historical Toy Museum in Freinsheim and the Toy museum in Havelland.

Caasmann spent time in the Berlin Zoo, where he modeled his animal models. He made a model for a porcelain cheetah group, manufactured by the Rudolstadt, Thuringia, German porcelain company Volkstedt. From 1912–1923, he modeled figurines based on his own designs for the porcelain manufacturer Rosenthal AG in Selb. In 1923 he modeled four figurines based on the paintings by Austrian painter Hanns Pellar for Rosenthal. The figurines Caasmann modeled for Rosenthal based on Pellar's paintings were Dreaming Night, Faun Group, Round Dance, and Shepard's Hour, Caasmann's work for the company Rosenthal are exhibited in the Porzellanikon's Rosenthal Museum.

Cassman died on 23 March 1968 in Brandenburg, East Germany. The street Caasmannstraße in Brandenburg was named by the city in honor of Albert Caasmann.
