= Philip Rosenthal (industrialist) =

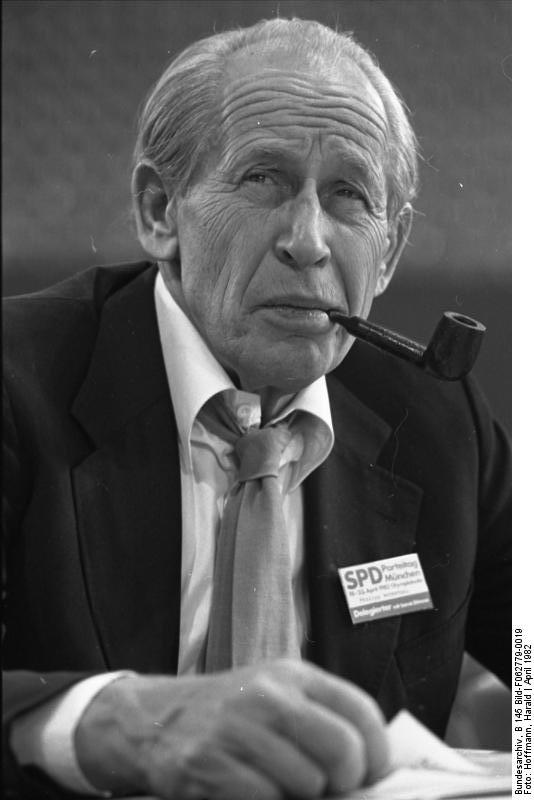
- Born: 23 October 1916; Berlin, German Empire
- Died: 27 September 2001 (aged 84); Selb, Germany
- Occupations: Industrialist, politician
- Known for: Rosenthal AG

Philip Rosenthal (23 October 1916 – 27 September 2001) was a German industrialist, socialite and Social Democratic Party politician. In 1950, Rosenthal regained control of the family's company Rosenthal AG after the fall of Nazi Germany. In 1968, Rosenthal was awarded the Bavarian Order of Merit and in 1981, the Order of Merit of the Federal Republic of Germany. From 1970 to 1971, he served as Germany's Parliamentary Secretary of State under the Ministry of Economic Affairs. Rosenthal was a public figure, and in addition to being Germany's "China King", he was often recognized for his eccentric lifestyle and personality.

== Early years ==
Born October 23, 1916, in Berlin, Germany, Philip Rosenthal was the only son of porcelain manufacturer Philipp Rosenthal from his second marriage to Maria Rosenthal (born Franck, Frank) He attended the Lyceum Alpinum Zuoz and the Wittelsbacher-Gymnasium in Munich. With the rise of Nazism, and because of his Jewish origin, he and his family had to emigrate to England in 1934. He then worked in the Foreign Office's propaganda department, among others, with the Soldatensender Calais.

== Rosenthal AG ==
Rosenthal company logo

In 1947, at the request of the family, he went to Selb for the Wiedergutmachung restitution claims. In 1950, Philip Rosenthal joined the paternal porcelain company, Rosenthal AG, and became head of the design department in 1952. From 1958 to 1970 and 1972 to 1981 he was chairman of the board. During this time, the company had more than 10,000 employees. From 1981 to 1989, he served as chairman of the supervisory board. As one of the first German entrepreneurs, he introduced a participation system for employees in 1963, "say and have" by means of co-determination and asset formation in productive capital. In 1968, Rosenthal made headlines when he passed his private share of company ownership in a testamentary way to a foundation for the training of workers to executive staff.

In addition, Philip Rosenthal was president of the German Design Council (1977-1986), chairman of the Bauhaus Archives in Berlin and chairman of the Association of the Ceramic Industry. His central concern as a person and entrepreneur was the "designed environment" with original art and contemporary design to enhance the quality of life of the individual. In collaboration with outstanding artists and designers from around the world, Philip Rosenthal succeeded in the late 1950s and 1960s to make the Rosenthal studio line a recognized model for modern design. From the porcelain factory of his father became a company for contemporary table and living culture. In 1988, Philip Rosenthal was appointed professor of design at the Bremen University of the Arts.

One of his guiding principles was: "Whoever thinks too late of the costs ruins his company. Whoever thinks too early of the cost kills creativity."

== Politician ==
In 1969, he joined the Social Democratic Party (SPD) and was elected to the Bundestag in the same year and in 1972 as a direct candidate in the Goslar - Wolfenbüttel electoral district, then to the Bavarian national list of his party. In September 1970, the entrepreneur became Parliamentary Secretary of State under the Ministry of Economic Affairs under Karl Schiller. However, he withdrew from the office in November 1971 due to differences with the latter about the pace of implementation of the employee participation in productive capacity In 1980, he was a member of the SPD Group.

Striving for social justice in the interaction between companies and employees was a dominant theme in his life.

== Personal life ==
Rosenthal was known as Germany's Emperor of China. A People profile on Rosenthal referred to the tycoons' company stating the "Rosenthal trademark is to china and glassware what Mercedes-Benz is to cars". He was notorious for his eccentric personality and lifestyle. Married four times, Rosenthal had numerous extramarital affairs that were regularly published in German tabloids.

Along with his family he lived primarily in the 18th-century Erkersreuth Castle near his celebrated ceramics factories in the West German town of Selb. Although he spent much of his life traveling with his five children and wife in a Volkswagen Bus with a red rowing scull on the roof. He designed and lead his family on segmented circle tour of Europe over the course of 20 years; starting a new segment of their hike or row at exactly the point where they last left off. His bedroom at the castle consisted of a mattress set on sand-colored carpeting, with tentlike drapes covering the walls and ceiling. He smoked cigars and used his home tanning bed frequently. His longest marriage was to Lavinia Day, twenty years his junior. Day is closely related to playwright, Clarence Day, and publisher Benjamin Day. The couple had four children, Shealagh, Philip Jr, Toby, and Julie. Philip Jr. briefly worked as Rosenthal's CEO and now runs Könitz Porzellan and Waechtersbach ceramics. His eldest daughter Shealagh Alison Macleod De Bourges Day Rosenthal is married to writer, Doron Weber. Philip Rosenthal died on 27 September 2001 in Selb, Germany, and is interred in a Rosenthal porcelain vase in Erkersreuth Castle's garden.

== Exhibitions ==
- 2016: Rosenthal - a myth. Two men write history. Porzellanikon, Hohenberg an der Eger and Selb.

== Portrait by Andy Warhol ==
Philip Rosenthal mit Zigarre (1980), Andy Warhol, screen printing 100 × 100 cm, Loaned by Rosenthal AG in the Ulmer Museum.

== Selected awards ==
- 1968 Bavarian Order of Merit
- 1981 Order of Merit of the Federal Republic of Germany
- 1982 Honorary citizenship of Atlanta
- 1989 Honorary citizenship of the city of Selb
- 1993 Lower Saxony Order of Merit

== Published works ==
- Einmal Legionär. Albrecht Knaus, Hamburg 1980, ISBN 3-8135-1085-9.

== Literature ==
- Joachim Hauschild: Philip Rosenthal. Ullstein, Berlin 1999, ISBN 3-548-35873-X.
- Wilhelm Siemen (2005). "Rosenthal, Philip". Neue Deutsche Biographie (in German). Vol. 22. Berlin: Duncker & Humblot. pp. 80–81. (full text online).
- Alexandra Siemen-Butz: Philip Rosenthal. Ein innovativer Unternehmer und politischer Mensch. Berlin 2016, ISBN 978-3-7418700-6-4.

== Film ==
- 1974: Philip Rosenthal. Reihe: Mäzene. Eine Produktion des Saarländischen Rundfunks (15 Minuten). Buch und Regie: Klaus Peter Dencker
