= Carolus Magnus Hutschenreuther =

German porcelain entrepreneur

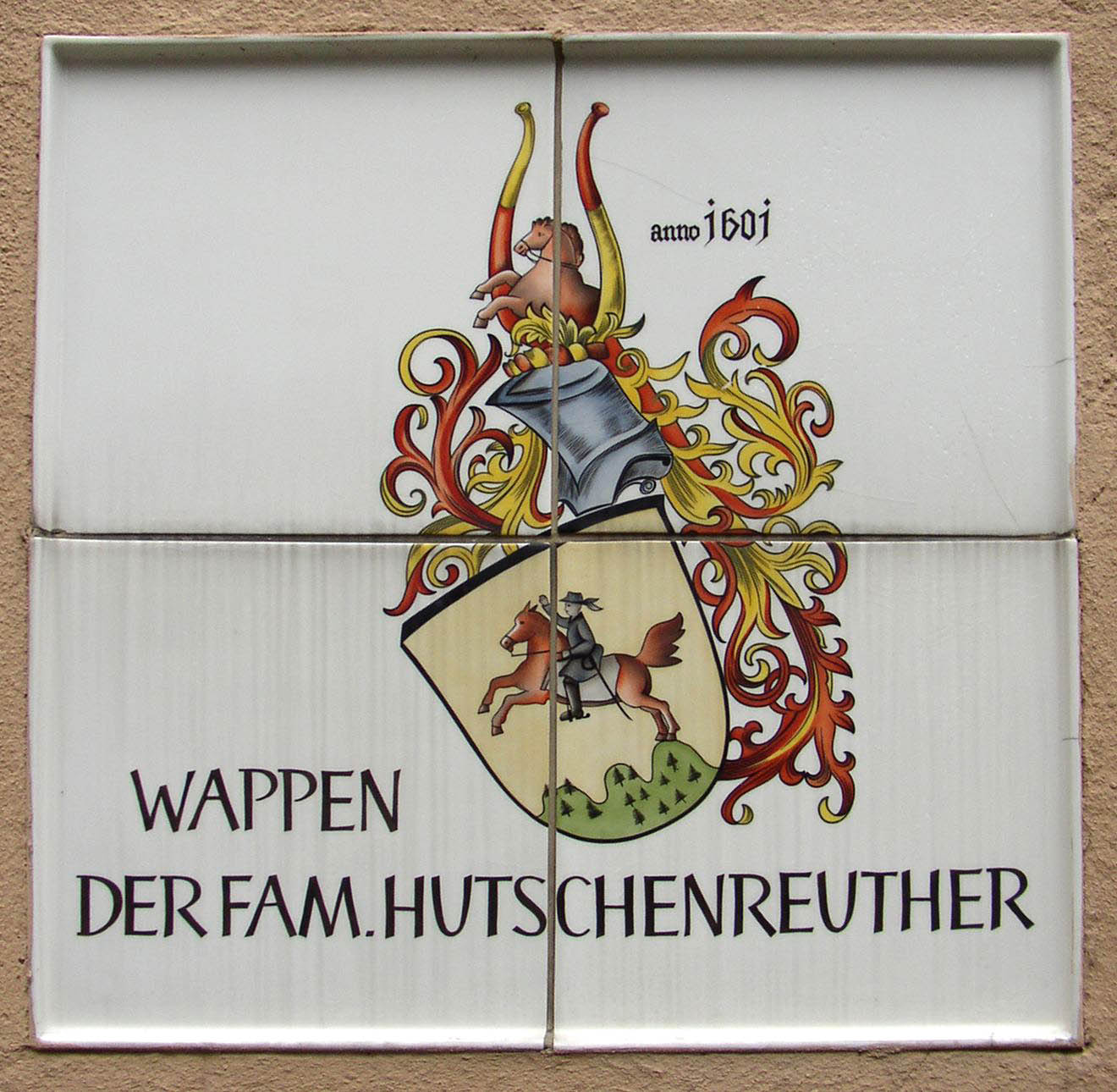
Family coat of arms

Carolus Magnus Hutschenreuther (9 April 1794 – 10 November 1845) was a German industrialist and the founder of the C.M. Hutschenreuther Porcelain Factory in Hohenberg an der Eger, Bavaria.

== Early years ==
Carolus Magnus Hutschenreuther was born in Lichte (Wallendorf), Thuringia, the 15th child of Johann Heinrich Hutschenreuther, a porcelain painter and owner of the Wallendorf Porcelain Manufactory. He earned his living selling porcelain items such as pipe-bowls and so-called Turkish cups in eastern Bavaria and especially in the spa towns of Bohemia.

In 1814, Hutschenreuther discovered deposits of kaolin, used to make fine white porcelain, near the River Eger, and decided to manufacture porcelain himself in Hohenberg, where a relative of his, Ernst Ludwig Reuß, was chief forester. Reuß made space available to him in Hohenburg Castle, and he began painting porcelain there and learning to manufacture it. In 1816 he married Reuß' daughter Johanna.

== Foundation of the C.M. Hutschenreuther Porcelain Manufactory ==
On 10 September 1816, he applied for permission to establish a porcelain manufactory in Hohenburg; after many difficulties, the concession was finally granted on 7 November 1822. By this time he had acquired a disused alum works, Auf der Freundschaft (Friendship), on the site of the present-day Hutschenreuther factory.

Initially, Hutschenreuther appears to have personally mixed the raw materials and overseen the firing, to guard the knowledge of the process. He was also probably responsible for most of the painting and shipping. Only after a second kiln and a larger watermill were constructed and additional porcelain decorators were added, including the sale of white wares to free-lance decorators, did the company become successful.

== Legacy of C.M. Hutschenreuther ==
C.M. Hutschenreuther died at Hohenberg on 10 November 1845. His widow Johanna and his sons Lorenz and Christian succeeded him as operators of the company, which withstood a serious fire in 1848, and Lorenz' departure in 1856 to form his own Hutschenreuther Porcelain Company in the neighbouring town of Selb. In 1969 this merged with the company founded by his father.

== Sources ==
- Horst Sommerer, Geschichte von CM Hutschenreuther (in German)
