= Raymond Peynet =

French cartoonist (1908–1999)

- Born: 16 November 1908; Paris, France
- Died: 14 January 1999 (aged 90); Mougins, France
- Known for: Cartoonist, illustrator, lithograph
- Awards: Commandeur de l'Ordre des Arts et Lettres
- Website: www.raymond-peynet.com

Raymond Peynet (16 November 1908 – 14 January 1999) was a French cartoonist who was born in Paris and died in Mougins (Alpes-Maritimes). He is known for having created the couple of lovers in 1942 which he represented through a variety of mediums, including ceramics, posters, jewelry, postcards, and postage stamps. In 1987, Raymond Peynet was promoted Commander of the Ordre des Arts et des Lettres.

== Biography ==
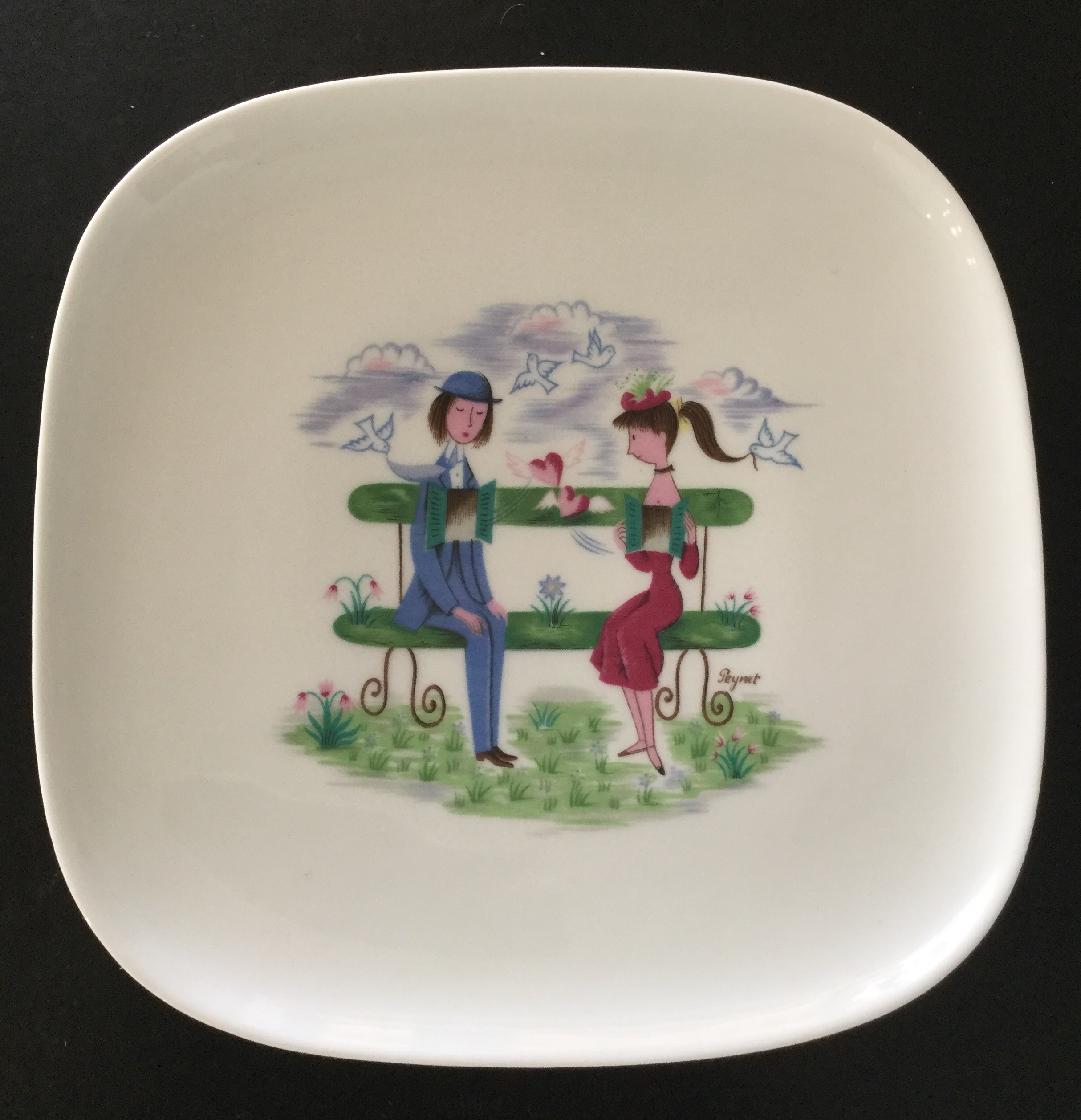
Raymond Peynet Rosenthal porcelain plate with the lovers.

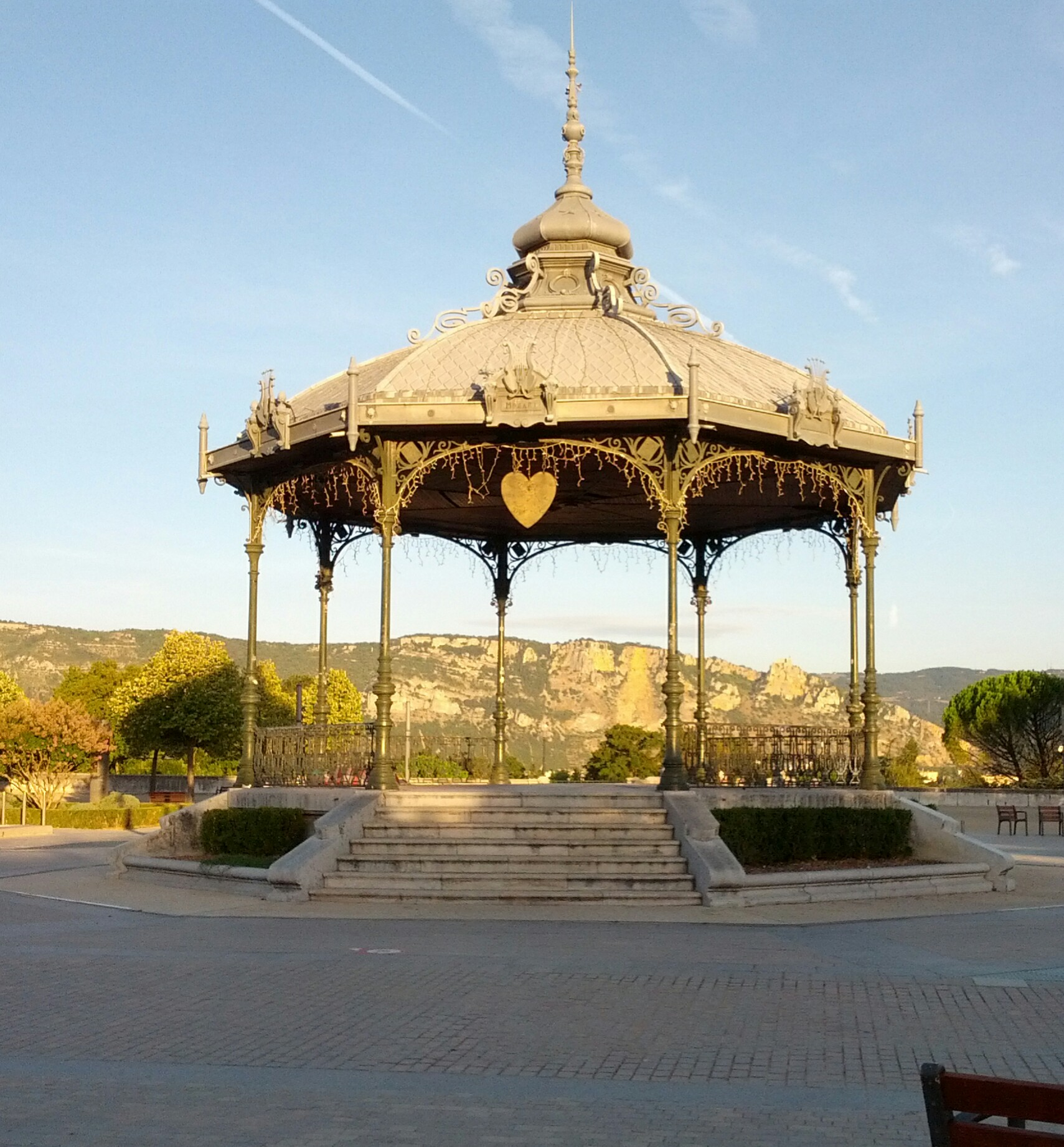
The "Peynet Kiosk" on the Champ de Mars in Valence.

At the age of 15, Raymond Peynet entered the Germain Pilon school, the future École des Arts Appliqués à l’Industrie of Paris. When he left, in the 1920s, he began working as an illustrator for the press and department store catalogs. In 1930, he married Denise Damour whom he had met during his first communion. The "lovers", the poet and his companion, were created by Peynet in 1942, in Valence, inspired by a music kiosk known since then as the Peynet kiosk. They would have inspired the song Les amoureux des bancs publics by Georges Brassens although this hypothesis is controversial.

In the 1960s and 1970s, Murat jewels produced many medals, tiepins and cuff-links, and more rarely watches, in gold or silver, bearing the effigy of Peynet's lovers. These jewels are now collected. Drawings from the original molds and new series are still published today.

Similarly, in the 1950s and 60s, latex foam dolls of Peynet lovers were a great success, about 6 million copies sold, before being dethroned by the Barbie dolls. Peynet dolls are actively collected but the latex has often deteriorated over time. Recent editions, often of lesser quality, are inspired by this production.

The figures are also on porcelain (Couleuvre in the 1950s, Rosenthal in the 1960s).

In addition to numerous illustrations of books, Peynet also focused his work on the production of advertising posters and in the 1980s lithographs representing lovers in various scenes and etchings representing "the signs of the zodiac".

The lovers were depicted in stamps in 1985 in France, Cancellation at the post of Valentine's Day in the Indre every February 14 and in postcards. The French stamp of 1985, "The Valentine's Day of Peynet", is pastel colors. The rural scene depicts a couple of lovers near a heart-shaped mailbox in which two angels post envelopes. In 2000, La Poste Francais took over these two characters for a tribute stamp to the deceased illustrator, this time representing the two characters near a music kiosk.

In 2002, a bottle of champagne was produced, with the label and the muselet plate illustrated by the lovers of Peynet, pieces that have become rare. Also a second series of bottles in 2004 were made, making five different capsules.

In France, two museums are devoted to Peynet: one in Antibes and one in Brassac-les-Mines, the birthplace of his mother. In Japan, there are also two museums devoted to the work of Peynet, Karuizawa and Sakuto. In 1987 Raymond Peynet was promoted Commander of the Ordre des Arts et des Lettres. Raymond Peynet strongly influenced the illustrators of the 1960s such as Alain Grée.

== Works ==
- Labiche (E.) et Marc-Michel, Un chapeau de paille d'Italie (A Straw Hat From Italy). Illustrations by R. Peynet. (Paris), Éditions du Bélier, 1943.
- Avec les yeux de l'amour (With the Eyes of Love), Paris, Éditions Denoël, 1967
- Parler d'amour avec tendresse (Talk about love with Tenderness), Paris, Éditions Fayard, 1975 (ISBN 978-2-213-00238-5)
- Les Amoureux de Peynet (The Lovers of Peynet), Paris, Éditions Hoëbeke, 1984
- De tout cœur (With all my Heart), Paris, Éditions Hoëbeke, 1999 (reprinted 2010) (ISBN 978-2-84230-084-5)
