= Bele Bachem =

German painter

- Born: Renate Gabriele Bachem; 17 May 1916; Düsseldorf, Germany
- Died: 5 June 2005 (aged 89); Munich, Germany
- Education: Berlin University of the Arts
- Known for: graphic artist, book illustrator, stage designer and writer
- Spouse: Günther Böhmer

Bele Bachem (née Renate Gabriele Bachem) (17 May 1916 – 5 June 2005) was a German graphic artist, book illustrator, stage designer and writer. In 1997, Bachem was awarded the Order of Merit of the Federal Republic of Germany.

== Life and work ==
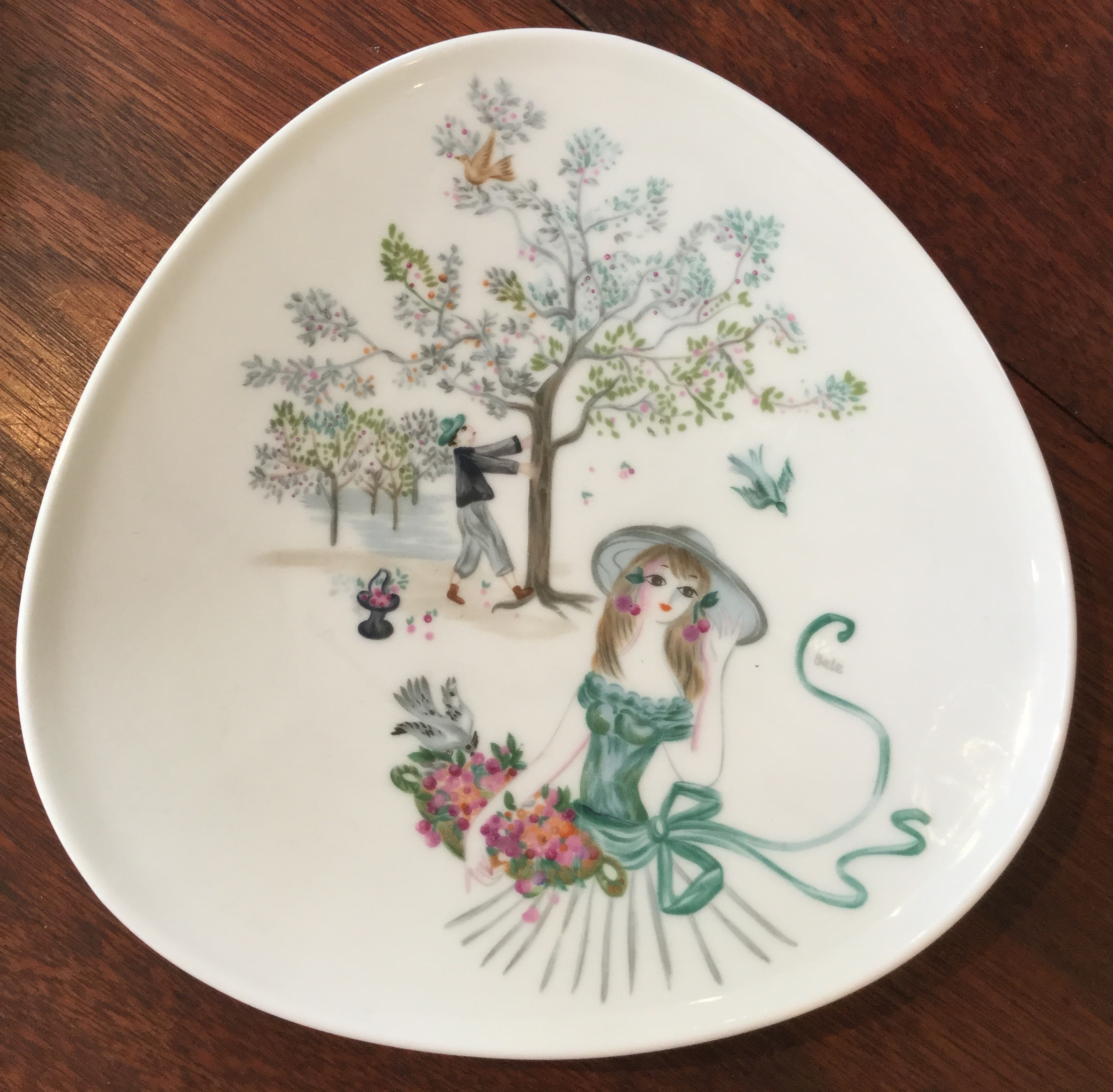
Rosenthal (company) porcelain plate with decoration designed by Bele Bachem.

Bele Bachem was the daughter of the painter Gottfried Maria Bachem and his wife Hedwig. She was born, and spent her childhood, in Düsseldorf. She went to Berlin University of the Arts at the end of the 1920s, where she was taught by Ludwig Bartning and Max Kraus. Her work quickly attracted attention and she was able to pursue her own style undisturbed. Soon she received her first assignments and was finally taken to Munich by Otto Falckenberg to create stage sets at the theater. In 1940 she married the art historian Günther Böhmer, (died 1992), and later that year their daughter was born. Shortly thereafter, their work was denounced by the National Socialists, and, within a year, public exhibitions of her work were banned.

After the war, Bachem published drawings in the satirical magazine Der Simpl and eventually resumed working on stage designs for the theatre. She illustrated and wrote books and designed for films. From 1954 to 1956 she was a lecturer in the Department of Illustration at the Werkkunstschule in Offenbach am Main. Bachem supplied numerous designs for the porcelain manufacturer Rosenthal and for the wallpaper factory Brascha Rasch.

Bachem is regarded as one of the most important German post-war artists and is, besides Unica Zürn, one of the few surrealists of German literature illustration.

== Book illustrations ==
- Clemens Brentano: Gockel, Hinkel und Gackeleia. Mit farbigen Illustrationen von Bele Bachem. Hamburg, Ellermann, 1952.
- Peter Scher: Drollige Käuze. Mit 20 Zeichnungen von Bele Bachem. (= Deutsche Soldatenbücherei Band 12), Siegismund, Berlin 1940.
- Catull: Liebesgedichte. Lateinisch und Deutsch, neu übertragen von Carl Fischer. Mit 48 Zeichnungen von Bele Bachem. Emil Vollmer Verlag, Wiesbaden o.J.
- Altchinesische Liebesgeschichten. Ins Deutsche übertragen von Franz Kuhn. Mit 28 Illustrationen von Bele Bachem. Emil Vollmer Verlag, Wiesbaden o.J.
- Lukian: Hetärengespräche. Übertragen von Carl Fischer. Mit 33 Zeichnungen von Bele Bachem. Emil Vollmer Verlag, Wiesbaden o.J.
- Ernst R. Lehmann-Leander (Hrsg.): Der Gürtel der Aphrodite. 100 erotische Gedichte aus 1000 Jahren antiker Kultur. Mit 26 Zeichnungen von Bele Bachem. Emil Vollmer Verlag, Wiesbaden o.J.
- Bodo Brodt: Parlez-moi d'amour ! Kleine Biographie des Schlagers. Mit Illustrationen von Bele Bachem. Offenbach/Main 1956.
- Stefan Békeffy: Der Hund, der Herr Bozzi hieß. Schutzumschlag, Einbandzeichnung und Illustrationen von Bele Bachem. Berlin 1959.
- Hansjürgen Weidlich: Liebesgeschichten für Schüchterne. 17 Illustrationen (einschl. Umschlag), Agentur des Rauhen Hauses, Hamburg 1959.
- Günther Schwenn: Zwischen sämtlichen Musen. Espresso-Elegien. Peters-Verlag, Berlin 1964.
- Vom Sklaven der Liebe. Die schönsten erotischen Geschichten aus 1001 Nacht. Nymphenburger Verlagsanstalt, München 1980.

== Published works ==
- Bele Bachem: Rosenwasser ausverkauft. Düsseldorf 1977.
- Bele Bachem: Signatur Objekt Nr. 2: Dein Gestern – Dein Schatten. Rolandseck 1985.
- Bele Bachem: Eine übliche kleine Bosheit. Düsseldorf 1980.

== Awards ==
- 1952: Poster Prize "Toulouse-Lautrec" of the City of Paris
- 1955: Poster Prize of the City of Vienna
- 1959: Prize of the Staatlichen Graphischen Sammlung München
- 1962: Schwabinger Art Prize
- 1966: "Water Lily Prize" of the City of Munich
- 1968: "Premier prix international IIIé salon de femme", Cannes
- 1986: Medal "München leuchtet – The friends of Munich"
- 1997: Order of Merit of the Federal Republic of Germany

== Art exhibitions ==
- 2015. Munich artist's house. Bele Bachem: "The longer you live, the more you become an apprentice."
- 2016. Bele Bachem (1916-2005) on the occasion of her 100th birthday. Gallery in the Schlosspavillon Ismaning
- 1998. Gemeinschaftsausstellung "Der Faden der Ariadne" im Herrenhof, Mußlach
- 1997. Kulturgebäude Aschheim - Galerie Bollhagen, Worpswede
- 1996 Galerie Hartmann, München Galerie Villa Rolandseck, Remagen Galerie der BBV, München
- 1995. Galerie Markt Bruckmühl
- 1994. Galerie Rutzmoser, München Hartgalerie, Germering Fischerplatz-Galerie, Ulm
- 1993. Osram-Haus, München
- 1992. Neue Münchener Galerie, München
- 1991. Galerie Schaffhaus, Neu-Ulm Galerie am Stephansberg, Bamberg
- 1988. Fischerplatz-Galerie, Ulm Galerie Kugel, Moers
- 1987. Galerie Götz, Stuttgart
- 1986. Galerie Wolfgang Ketterer, München
- 1985. Städtische Galerie, Rosenheim Edwin-Scharff-Haus, Neu-Ulm
- 1984. Galerie Bollhagen, Worpswede
- 1983. Bodley Gallery, New York
- 1982. BMW- Haus, München Galerie Turkuwaz, Ankara
- 1980. Bayerischer Pavillon, Bonn Internationale Kunstmesse Basel
- 1979. Galerie Lutzke, Wachtberg Galerie Harms, Mannheim Galerie im Falckenhof, Rheine
- 1978. Galerie Zwei müller, Baden bei Wien
- 1977. Komunale Galerie, Berlin Galerie Harms, Mannheim Galerie Europa, Berlin Galerie Brettschneider, Berlin Galerie Kamp, Amsterdam
- 1976. Galerie an der Düssel, Düsseldorf Galerie Harms, Mannheim Galerie AAA, Ascona
- 1973. Galerie Rutzmoser, München
- 1972. Galerie Hiepe, München
- 1971. Galerie Hell, Saarbrücken Galerie am Stephansberg, Bamberg Galerie Mensch, Hamburg Galerie Samuel Show, New York
- 1970. Galerie Ostheimer, Frankfurt a. M. Galerie am Abend, München Galerie Hartmann, München
- 1969. Galerie Griebert, Montreux Galerie Peithner- Lichtenfels, Wien
- 1968. Galerie Lempertz, 1. Retrospektive, Köln
- 1967. Galerie Voigt, Nürmberg
- 1966. Galerie von Sydow, Frankfurt a. M.
- 1965. Galerie Totti, Mailand Galerie von der Höh, Hamburg
- 1964. Galerie Moering, Wiesbaden
- 1963. Galerie Gurlitt, München
- 1957. Biennale Santa Margaretha
- 1954. Biennale Bozen
- 1952. Galerie Sello, Hamburg
- 1951. Münchner Pavillon, München
- 1947. Galerie Kikio Haller, Zürich

== Literature ==
- Ulrike Camilla Gärtner: Bele Bachem. Werkverzeichnis 1935–1986. München 1986.
- Olaf N. Schwanke: Ich neige so zum Düsteren. Ein längst fälliger Essay zu Deutschlands wahrscheinlich einziger literarischer Surrealistin: Bele Bachem. (PDF; 79 kB), In: Kritische Ausgabe, 1/2002, S. 38–42.
- Theo Rommerskirchen: Bele Bachem. In: viva signatur si! Remagen-Rolandseck 2005. ISBN 3-926943-85-8
