= Rosenthal (company) =

German manufacturer of porcelain and household goods

Rosenthal GmbH
- Type: GmbH
- Industry: Household goods
- Founded: 1879
- Headquarters: Selb, Bavaria, Germany
- Products: Porcelain and housewares
- Owner: Sambonet Paderno Industrie (Arcturus Group)
- Number of employees: 800 (2019)
- Website: www.rosenthal.de

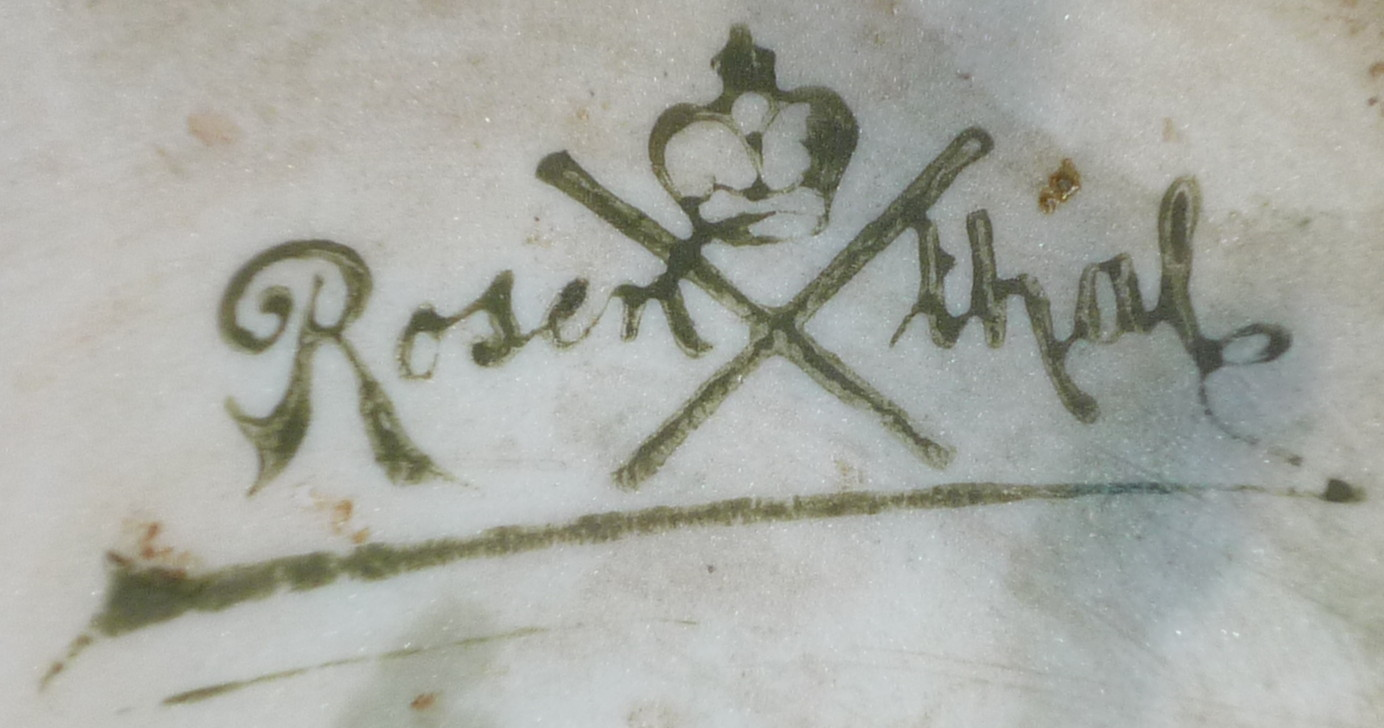
Rosenthal factory mark around 1900

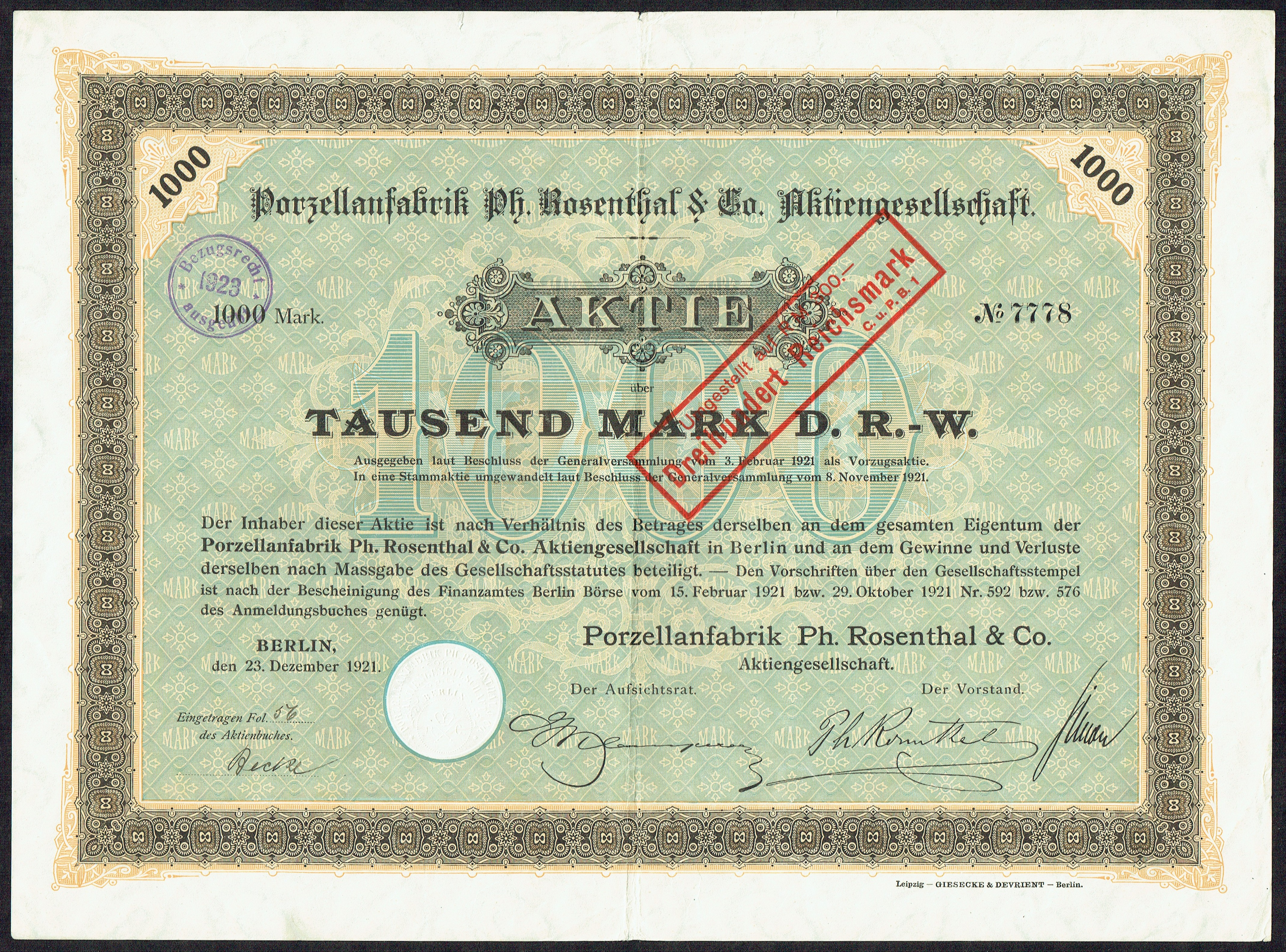
Share of the Porzellanfabrik Ph. Rosenthal & Co. AG, issued 23 December 1921.

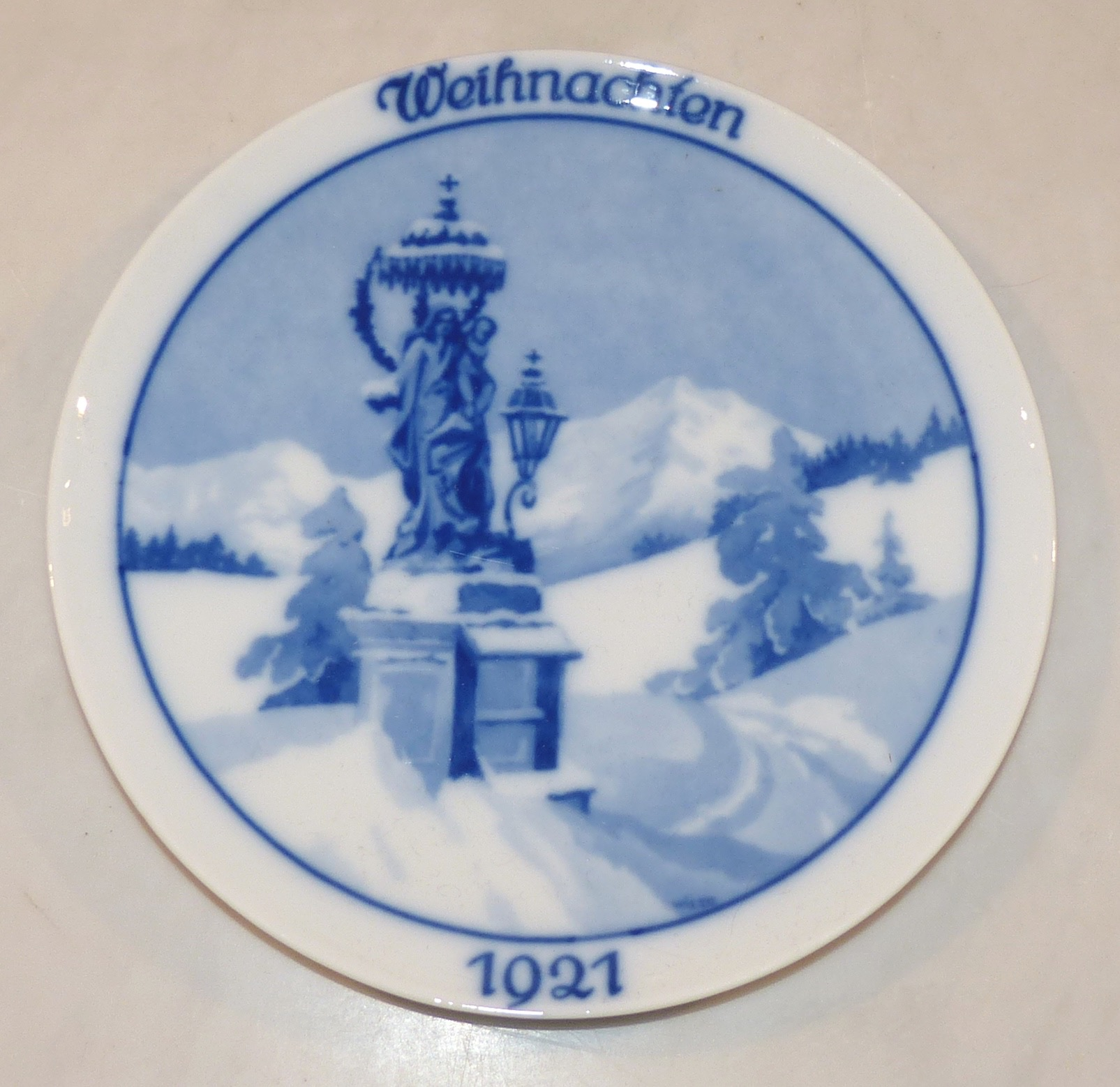
Rosenthal-Weihnachtsteller 1921, designed by Jupp Wiertz

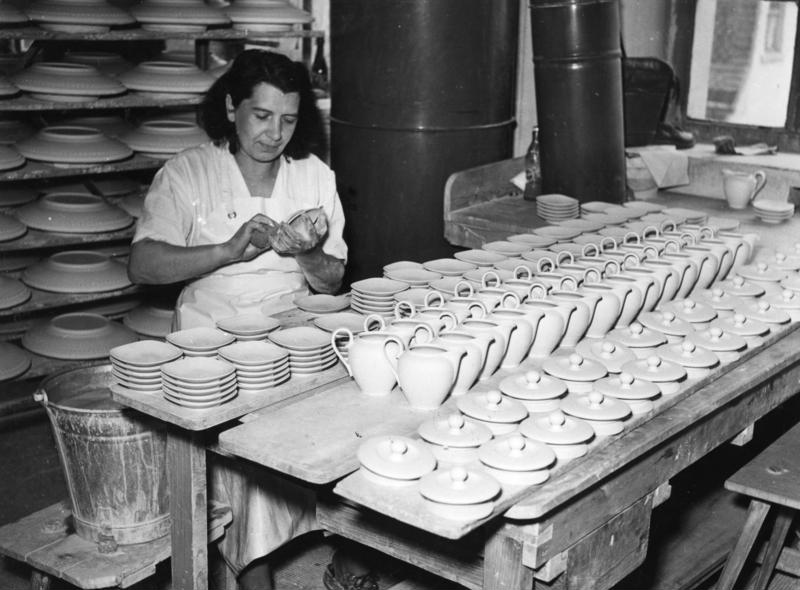
Fettling cups at the Selb factory in 1956

Rosenthal GmbH is a German manufacturer of porcelain products and other household goods. The original firm was founded in 1879 in Selb, Bavaria. Since 2009, Rosenthal has been owned by the Italian company Sambonet Paderno Industrie (Arcturus Group).

== History ==
Rosenthal was founded in 1879 as a family business. The founder, Philipp Rosenthal, moved his porcelain painting business from Werl in North Rhine-Westphalia to Selb in Bavaria, where he was based in the castle Erkersreuth. In 1897, Philipp Rosenthal founded the company Bauer, Rosenthal & Co. in Kronach, as well as Philipp Rosenthal & Co. AG. In 1908, Rosenthal bought the porcelain manufacturer Thomas in Marktredwitz, and the porcelain company Zeidler & Co. in 1917.

In 1921, the company took over the Krister Porzellanmanufaktur in Wałbrzych, Silesia. The factory was closed in 1945, but the brand was revived in 1951 and used until 1971.

In the Nazi period, Philipp Rosenthal, while Catholic, had to withdraw from the enterprise in 1934 because of his Jewish origin. The Board of Management and the supervisory board turned against Rosenthal and implemented various measures to prevent Philipp Rosenthal from using his voting shares in order to change the composition of the management board and the supervisory board. The government was asked for support and sold the voting shares to persons who were not well-disposed towards Rosenthal. However, the Nazi regime did not go directly against Philipp Rosenthal in order not to jeopardise the foreign business of the company. The reasonably covertly concealed Aryans took advantage of the family, and urged Rosenthal's successor to step out of the company. Philipp Rosenthal's death in 1937 finally paved the way for his grandchildren. In 1936, Rosenthal bought the porcelain manufacturers Waldershof and Thomas in Weidenberg-Sophienthal. Rosenthal Isolatoren GmbH (RIG) was established in 1939 with branches in Erkersreuth (Selb) and Hennigsdorf near Berlin. In 1939 the company changed to Rosenthal Porzellan AG. When the Decree on Companies of Deprived Commercial Enterprises (RGBI 1941, p. 177), adopted on 27 March 1941, forced the discontinuation of the Jewish company and brand name Rosenthal, the "Aryan" management intervened through Joseph Goebbels to continue the use of the Rosenthal brand name.

With the return of Philipp Rosenthal's son Philip Rosenthal from exile and his entry into the enterprise in 1950, he won a pioneering role in the modern product design. In 1960, the Rosenthal Studiohaus was opened in Nuremberg, from which the world's first design chain was built. In 1965 the uniform name Rosenthal Glas & Porzellan AG was elected and shortened to Rosenthal AG in 1969. In 1972, Philip Rosenthal founded the furniture factory Rosenthal Einrichtung in Espelkamp. The furniture factory was renamed in 2009 Philip Möbelmanufaktur GmbH and in 2013 rebranded the Fröscher GmbH & CO. KG. Rosenthal, In collaboration with industrial designers such as Raymond Loewy, Tapio Wirkkala, Elsa Fischer-Treyden, Timo Sarpaneva, Verner Panton and Luigi Colani, created an impressive series of products. Walter Gropius design for Rosenthal the tea service TAC. In 1967, Rosenthal built the so-called "Glassmaker's Cathedral," a factory for the Thomas-Glassworks in Amberg. The Thomas-Glassworks was renamed the Amberg crystal glass factory.

In 1997, Rosenthal AG was 90% owned by the British-Irish Waterford Wedgwood Group. Rosenthal was the market leader for high-quality porcelain and glassware in Germany. In the year 2000, the company took over the Hutschenreuther brand and Hutschenreuther-Werk B in Selb.

In June 2008, the Waterford Wedgwood Group wanted to divest the Rosenthal share package due to liquidity difficulties. At this time, around 1,100 employees were employed worldwide. The company, faced with insolvency by the subsequent collapse of Waterford Wedgwood, filed for insolvency on 9 January 2009. The subsequent insolvency proceedings of Rosenthal AG were opened on 1 April 2009 by the District Court. Its US business filed for Chapter 7 bankruptcy liquidation in April 2009. On 20 July 2009, a sale was announced to an Italian company, Sambonet Paderno Industrie (Arcturus Group). Founded on 1 August 2009, Rosenthal GmbH is an independent part of Sambonet Paderno Industrie (Arcturus Group). The Rosenthal company headquarters remain in Selb under the managing director Pierluigi Coppo.

The Rosenthal Archive, a collection of around 15,000 exhibits from 130 years of company history, were purchased by the Oberfranken Foundation on 12 August 2009 and is provided as a permanent loan to the Porzellanikon, the State Museum of Porcelain in Hohenberg an der Eger, Selb. These include nearly all product designs, from the company's foundation to today, as well as originals designed by artists such as Salvador Dalí, Andy Warhol, Wilhelm Wagenfeld and Walter Gropius.

== Designers ==
- Otmar Alt
- Joannis Avramidis
- Bele Bachem
- Herbert Bayer
- Arlon Bayliss
- Mario Bellini
- Michael Boehm
- Rut Bryk
- Nina Campbell
- Albert Caasmann
- Luigi Colani
- Salvador Dalí
- Elsa Fischer-Treyden
- Waldemar Fritsch
- Piero Fornasetti
- Ernst Fuchs
- Friedrich Grasel
- HAP Grieshaber
- Walter Gropius
- Dorothy Hafner
- O.H. Hajek
- Erich Hawser
- Ferdinand Liebermann
- Raymond Loewy
- Martin Matschinsky
- Marcello Morandini
- Rosemonde Nairac
- Verner Panton
- Eduardo Paolozzi
- Raymond Peynet
- Ambrogio Pozzi
- Lord Queensbury
- Ivan Rabuzin
- Aldo Rossi
- Timo Sarpaneva
- Alev Ebüzziya Siesbye
- Patricia Urquiola
- Johan van Loon
- Jan van der Vaart
- Victor Vasarely
- Gianni Versace
- Alan Whittaker
- Bjørn Wiinblad
- Tapio Wirkkala
- Fritz Wotruba
- James Kirkwood 1972-
- Paul Wunderlich
- Carlo Zauli
- Martin Freyer

== Brands ==
- Rosenthal studio-line, design-oriented crockery and art objects made of porcelain and glass
- Rosenthal classic, classic-design porcelain
- Rosenthal meets Versace, luxury porcelain in collaboration with Versace (since 1992)
- Thomas (owned by Rosenthal since 1908), design-oriented mass use porcelain
- Hutschenreuther (owned by Rosenthal since 2000), general porcelain for homes and hotels
- Arzberg (owned by Rosenthal since 2013)
- Arthur Krupp, an inexpensive line for the hospitality industry

== Gallery ==
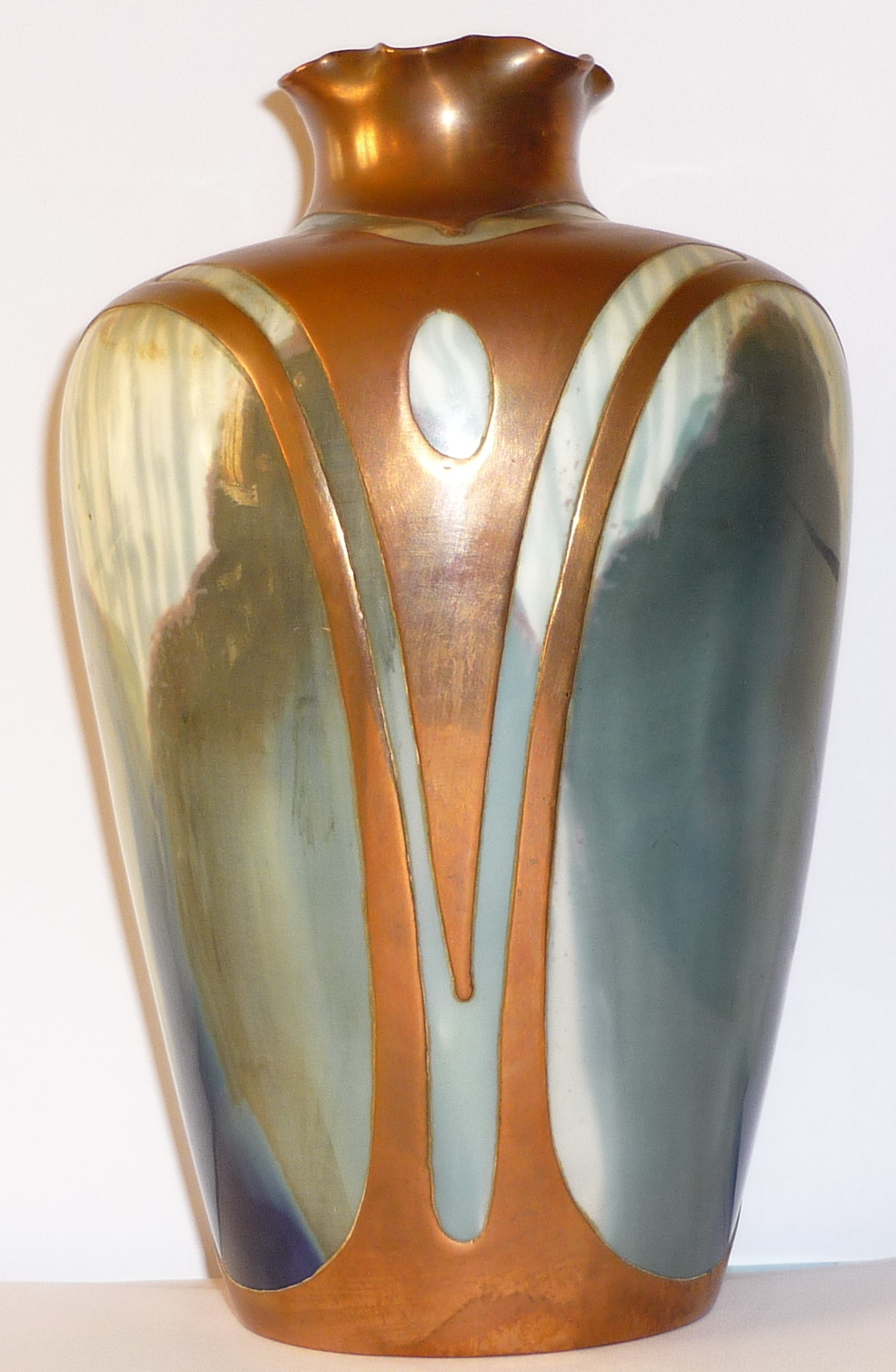
Vase, Art Nouveau, around 1900

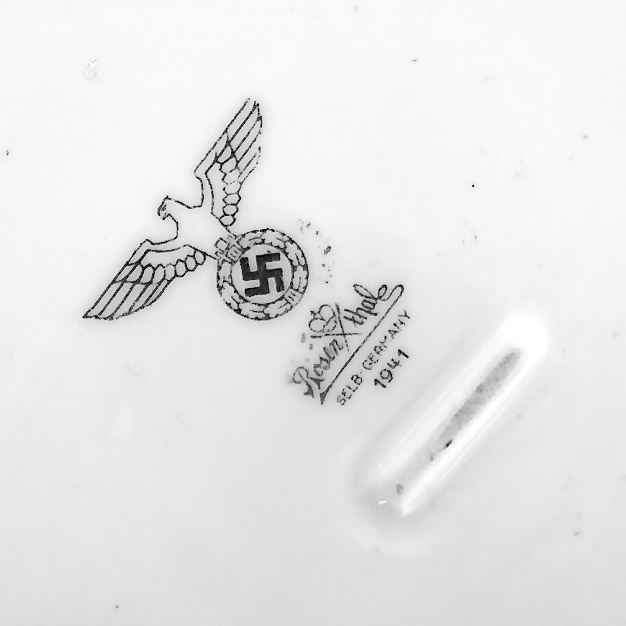
Backstamp 1941. Special series for Nazi state and party.

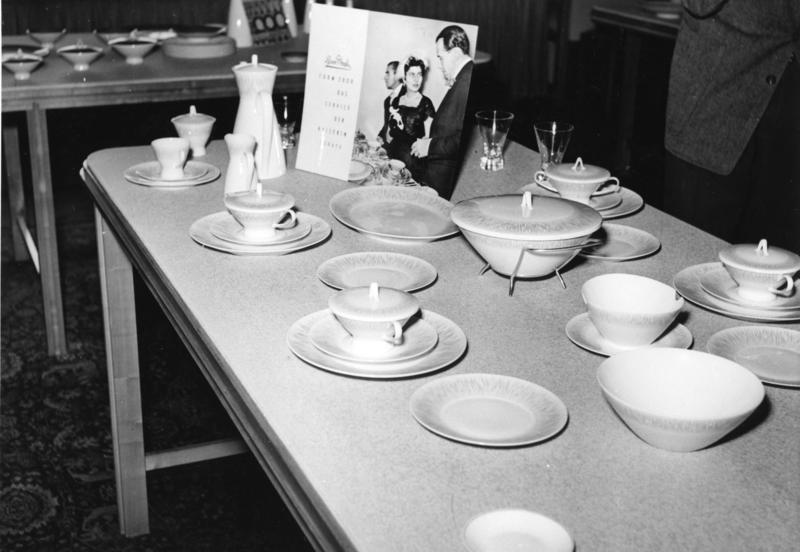
Service "2000", design by Raymond Loewy/Richard Latham (1954)

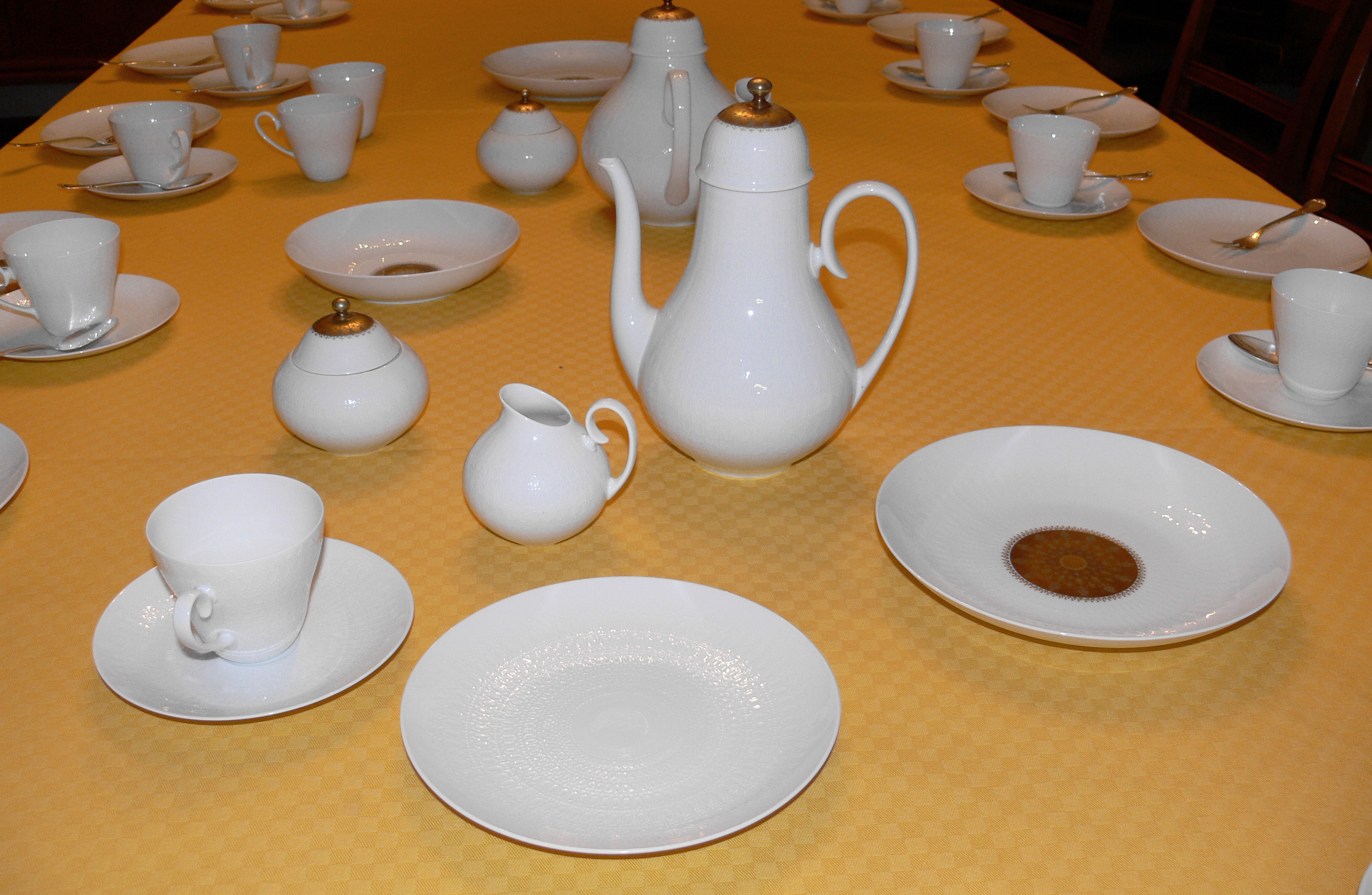
Service "Romanze", designed by Bjørn Wiinblad (1959)

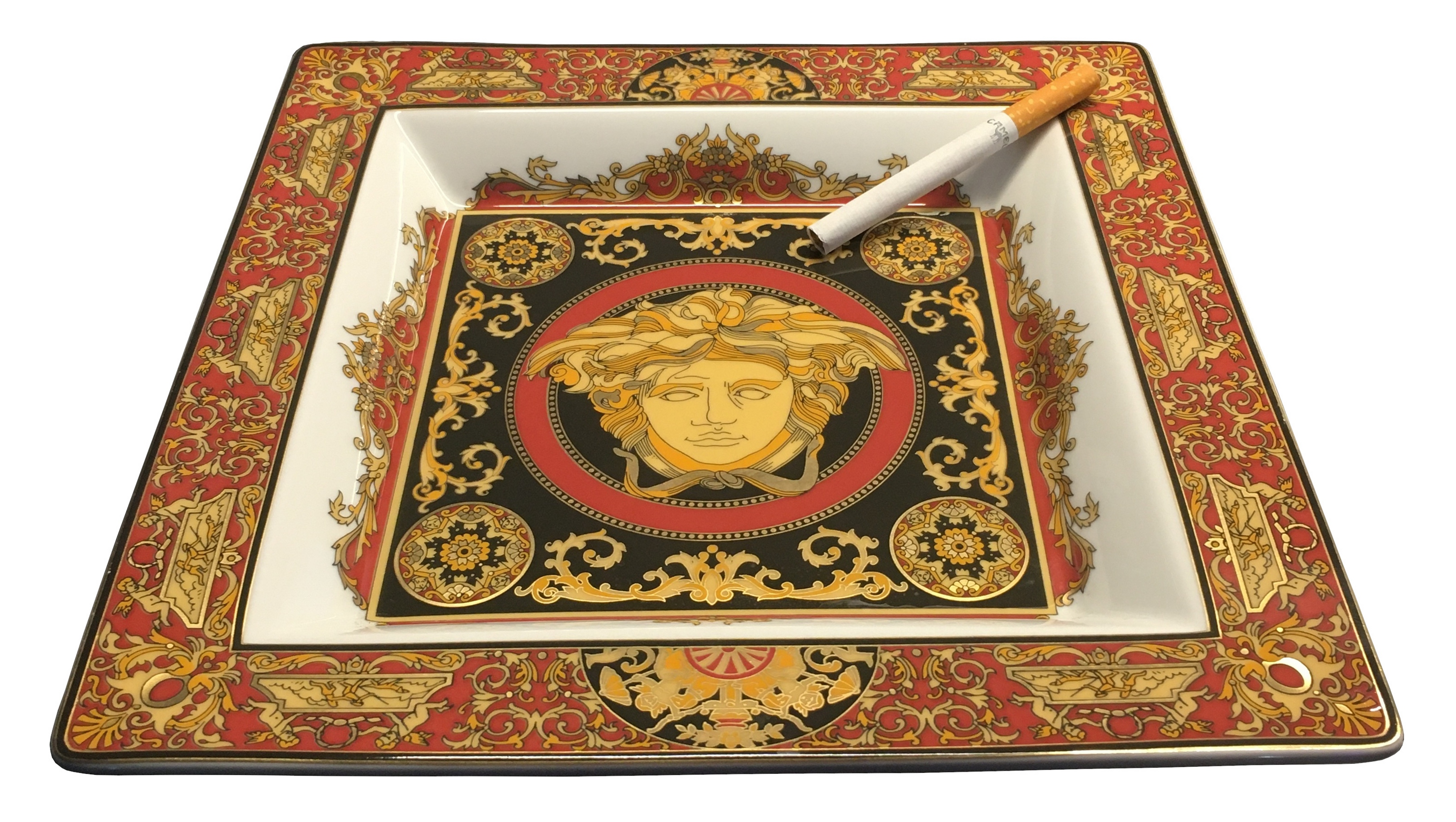
Large (22 cm × 22 cm) ashtray from a series designed by Versace

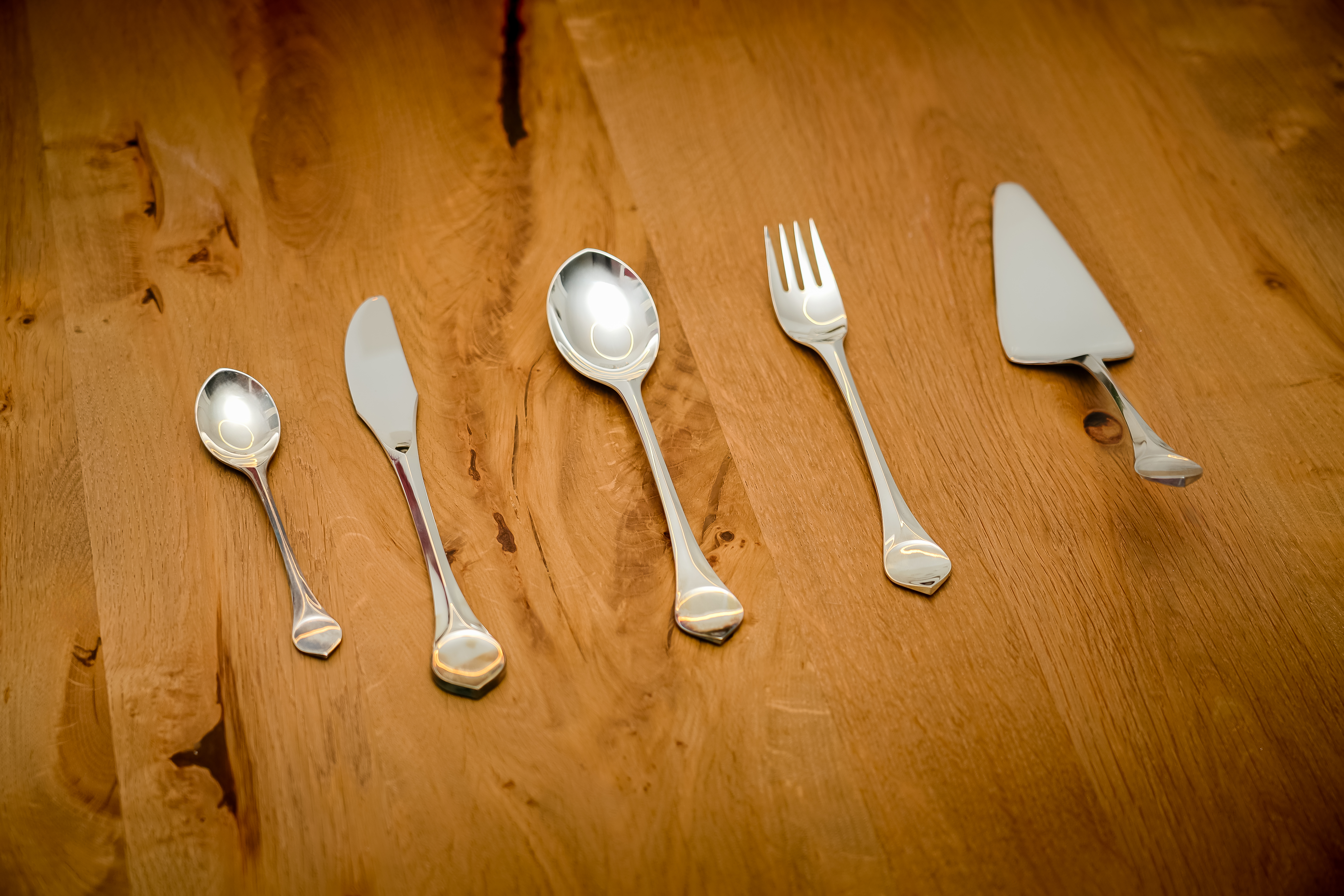
Rosenthal "Lotus" Silver Cutlery Set

== Literature ==
- Dieter Struß: Rosenthal. Service, figures, ornamental and art objects. Battenberg, Augsburg 1995, ISBN 3-89441-211-9 (English translation 1997).
