= Alev Ebüzziya Siesbye =

Turkish-Danish ceramic artist

- Born: 30 August 1938; Istanbul, Turkey
- Known for: Ceramics

Alev Ebüzziya Siesbye (born 30 August 1938) is a Turkish-Danish ceramic artist. Siesbye designed ceramic wares for the ceramic companies Royal Copenhagen and Rosenthal AG. In 2009, Siesbye was awarded the Chevalier de l'Ordre des Arts et des Lettres for her ceramic designs.

== Biography ==
Siesbye was born in Istanbul on 30 August 1938. After studying sculpture at the Istanbul Academy of Fine Arts from 1956-1958, she left for Germany where she worked in ceramic factories in Höhr-Grenzhausen. She returned two years later to Istanbul to work in the Art Workshop of the Eczacibasi Ceramic Factories. In 1962, she left Istanbul for Copenhagen and worked for the ceramic company Royal Copenhagen as an artist. She opened her own workshop in 1969. She lived in Denmark until 1987, when she decided to go to Paris. From 1975 to 1990, she worked as a ceramic designer for Rosenthal AG and from 1984-2000 for Royal Copenhagen. In 2007, she became a designer for Pasabahce Glass Factories in Turkey and resides in Paris.

She has built an international reputation as a ceramist by modeling bowls. In 2002, "A ceramics Universe/1964-2002," a retrospective exhibition of her works, was exhibited in the Turkish and Islamic Arts Museum in Istanbul and the Danish Museum of Decorative Art in Copenhagen. She is in the collections of more than 34 major museums in the world.

The work titled "İki Satır İki Satırdır" includes Turkish poet Edip Cansever's letters written to Alev Ebüzziya between 1962-76.

== Selected awards ==
- 1983 Eckersberg Medal
- 1990 Louis Vuitton Möet Hennessy "Science pour l'art" Prize
- 1995 Prince Eugen Medal
- 2009 Chevalier de l'Ordre des Arts et des Lettres
- 2010 C.L. David's Honorary Legate

== Personal exhibitions ==
- 1964 Danimarka Kraliyet Porcelen Fabrikaları Kopenhag
- 1971 Galerie Birkdam Kopenhag
- 1975 Museum of Decorative Arts Kopenhag
- 1976 Hetjens Museum Dusseldorf
- 1979 Gallery In-Art Amsterdam
- 1981 Retrospektif Sergi, Kunstforeningen, Kopenhag
- 1982 Grès, Maison du Danemark Paris
- 1982 Kunstkammer Paul Köster, Mönchen-Gladbach
- 1983 Kunstindustrimuseet Kopenhag
- 1983 Röhsska Museum, Göteborg
- 1984 Garth Clark Gallery, Los Angeles
- 1984 Garth Clark Gallery, New York
- 1985 Galerie Nord, Randers
- 1987 Galerie Gummasons, Stockholm
- 1987 Galeri Nev, Ankara
- 1988 Galeri Nev, Urart Sanat Galerisi, İstanbul
- 1990 Galerie Jonas, Neuchatel
- 1991 Galerie Epona, Paris
- 1991 Galerie Egelund, Kopenhag
- 1992 Maison de la Céramique, Mulhouse
- 1992 Garth Clark Gallery New York
- 1992 Galeri Nev, Ankara
- 1992 Gallery Besson, Londra
- 1992 Galeri Nev, İstanbul
- 1993 Galeri Nev, İstanbul/Ankara
- 1994 Garth Clark Gallery, Los Angeles
- 1994 Galerie Egelund, Kopenhag
- 1995 Galeri Nev, Ankaraİstanbul
- 1995 Galerie Osiris, Brüksel
- 1996 Borreby Art Gallery, Borreby Slot, Skaelskör
- 1997 Ayşe ve Ercümend Kalmık Vakfı, İstanbul
- 1998 Yedi Sarı Çanak Ayşe ve Ercümend Kalmık Vakfı
- 1999 Galeri Nev, İstanbuL
- 2000 Galerie Elise Toft, Kolding
- 2001 Garth Clark Gallery, New York
- 2002 Retrospektif Sergi, Kunstindustrimuseet, Kopenhag
- 2002 Bir Seramik Evreni: 1964-2002, Retrospektif Sergi, Türk İslam Eserleri Müzesi, İstanbul
- 2003 Galerie Besson, Londra
- 2004 Galerie Puls, Brüksel
- 2005 Retrospektif Sergi, Museu Nacional do Azulejo, Lizbon
- 2005 Yufuku Gallery, Tokyo
- 2006 Galeri Nev, Ankara
- 2018 Galeri Nev, İstanbul
