= Waldemar Fritsch =

- Born: 23 March 1909; Altrohlau, Germany
- Died: 13 July 1978 (aged 69); Ansbach, Germany
- Known for: Sculpture, ceramics

Waldemar Fritsch (23 March 1909 – 13 July 1978) was a Sudeten-German porcelain sculptor and ceramist, who lived and worked in Ansbach, Germany after his expulsion from West Bohemia in 1946.

== Biography ==
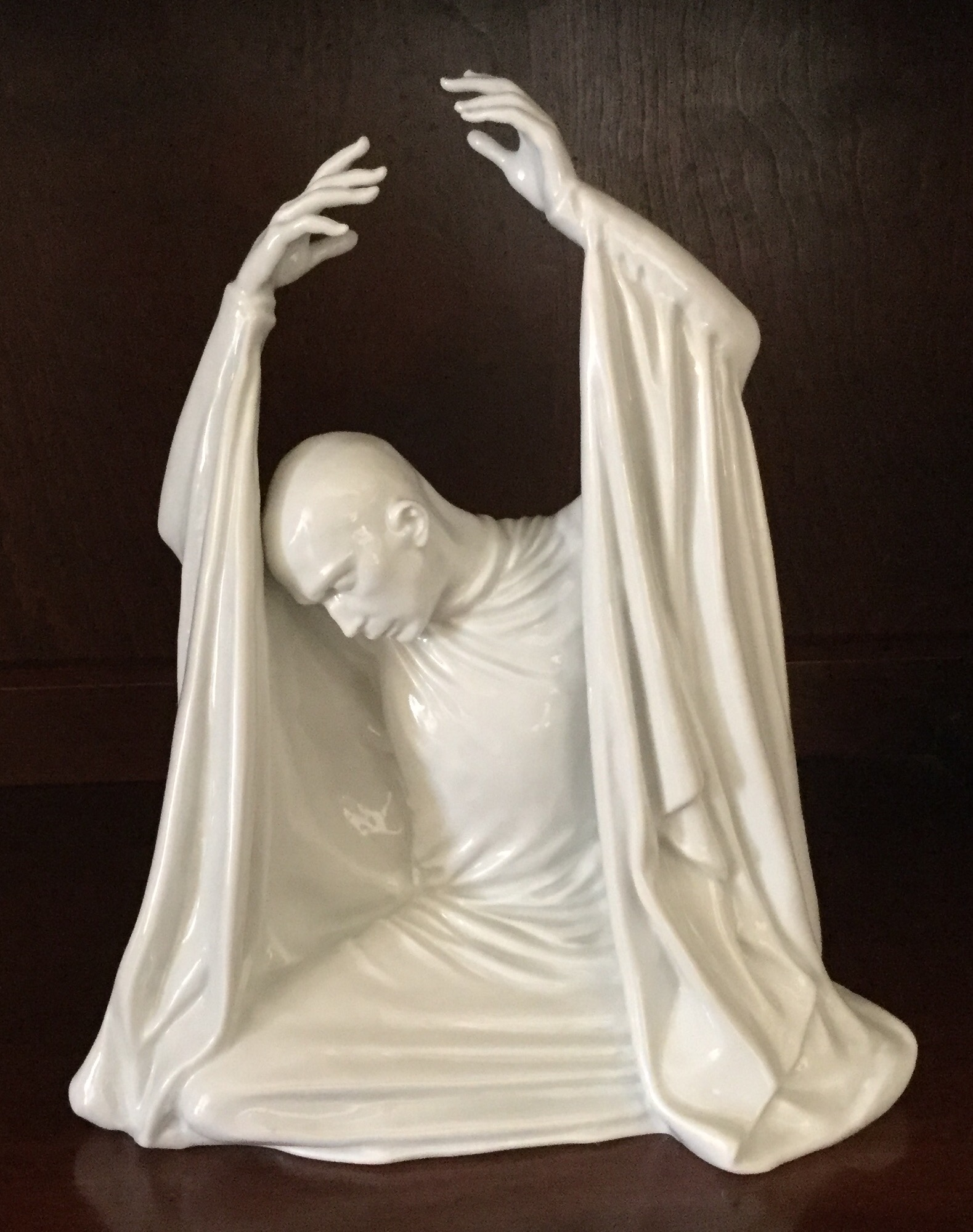
Waldemar Fritsch figurine "Night Song" for Rosenthal AG (1951). Based on dancer Harald Kreutzberg in the dance Night Song to the music of Johannes Brahms.

Waldemar Fritsch was born in 1909 as a tenth and last child in Altrohlau (today Stará Role, part of Karlovy Vary), part of the double monarchy of Austria-Hungary. His father worked as a fiacre in Karlovy Vary until the age of 75. After graduating from the Volks und Bürgerschule, Fritsch trained as a porcelain tool and mold founder in the "Viktoria" porcelain factory in Altrohlau. The area around Egerland, Karlovy Vary and Teplitz-Schönau were regarded as important sites of the porcelain and ceramics industry. Technical schools for the technical and artistic training of ceramists existed in Karlovy Vary (since 1925) and Teplitz-Schönau (1875), and in 1811 porcelain was produced in Altrohlau.

Fritsch went to the Prague School of Fine Art from 1929 and the Porzellanfachschule Karlsbad-Fischern from 1926. In his creations, he drew attention by the artistic quality of small sculptures such as the terracotta-relief "Jugend," a kitten and chicken group as well as a lying wolfshund. In Prague, he created porcelain sculptures of Saint Sebastian, a loreley, a cockatoos, and a woman with a child and a baby.

In 1934, Fritsch received an assistant position at the state school for ceramics in Teplitz-Schönau, which he took over in the autumn of 1938. In 1939, he was awarded a professorship for applied sculpture to the State College of the Porcelain Industry in Karlovy Vary. After denouncing the Nazis, Fritsch was imprisoned in Dresden and Berlin by the Gestapo in 1939. When freed in 1940, he was forbidden to work. From 1943 and until the war ended, he served in the Wehrmacht.

In 1946, he moved to southwest Germany with his 80-year-old parents, where he found a new home in Ansbach in 1947 after temporary stays in Stuttgart-Wendlingen and Ellingen. A period of great creativity followed after moving to Ansbach. His porcelain sculptures were in the Ansbach museum, which dedicated a special exhibition to Fritsch in 1963. He died 13 July 1978 in Ansbach and is buried in the cemetery of the church of St. Lambertus in Ansbach-Eyb.

== Works ==
His works, in approximate chronological order are:

- Scalare
- Egerländer farmers couple
- Girl with the carnation
- Holy family on the run
- Floating
- Blessing Christ
- Sinning youth
- Venus in the arbor
- Lying youth
- Lying girls
- Dreikönig's group
- Listening
- Christ's head
- Young man's head
- Allegory on Carlsbad
- Day, night and morning
- Night Song
- Ecce homo
- Xuchitl
- Ixcauatzine
