= Dorothy Hafner =

American ceramist and glass artist

- Born: 1952 (age 73–74); Woodbridge, Connecticut
- Education: Skidmore College
- Known for: ceramic and glass artist
- Notable work: two works in the Smithsonian American Art Museum

Dorothy Hafner (born 1952) is an American ceramist and glass artist.

== Early life ==
Born in Woodbridge, Connecticut, Hafner earned her bachelor's degree from Skidmore College in 1974, also completing graduate work at that institution.

== Career ==
She next worked as a production manager for the International Craft Film Festival, and beginning in 1976 served as director of the international department of the Museum of Contemporary Crafts in New York City. For the two years following she was artist-in-residence at Artpark in Lewiston, New York. In 1979 she set up the firm Art in Dining in New York City, under which banner she designed porcelain tableware for such firms as Neiman Marcus and Tiffany & Co.; beginning in 1982 her work was also carried by Rosenthal. Her work has won numerous honors and awards. Hafner began her career as a ceramist, but in 1997 turned exclusively to glass work. Two of her works are in the collection of the Smithsonian American Art Museum.
