= Hutschenreuther family =

German porcelain business (1814–1969)

Hutschenreuther
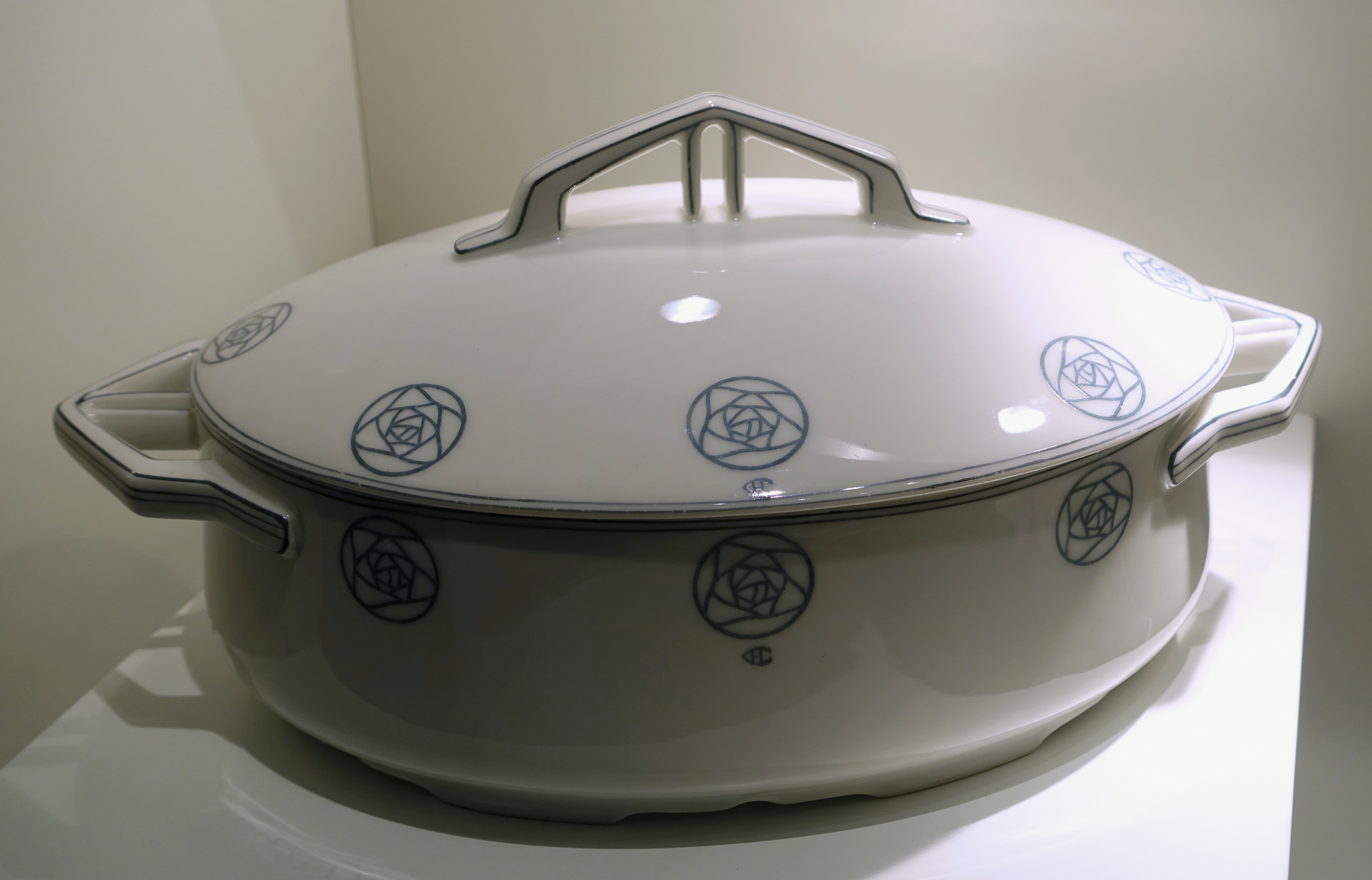
- Dish from service with stylized roses, designed by Hans Christiansen, made by Lorenz Hutschenreuther, c. 1903
- Industry: Household goods
- Founded: 1814; 211 years ago (in Hohenberg an der Eger, Bavaria)
- Founder: Carolus Magnus Hutschenreuther
- Defunct: 1969
- Successor: Porzellanfabrik Lorenz Hutschenreuther
- Headquarters: Selb, Bavaria, Germany
- Products: Porcelain
- Owner: Rosenthal GmbH
- Website: hutschenreuther.com

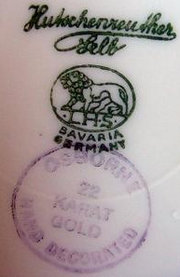
Osborne Art Studio decorated Lorenz Hutschenreuther Selb cup and saucer

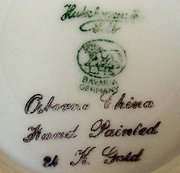
Osborne Art Studio backstamp on Lorenz Hutschenreuther Selb saucer

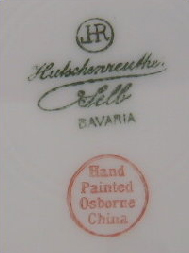
Osborne Art Studio decorated Hutschenreuther Selb 6-1/4 plate

Hutschenreuther is the name of a German family that established the production of porcelain in northern Bavaria, starting in 1814.

== History ==
The Hutschenreuther porcelain business was founded in 1814 by Carolus Magnus Hutschenreuther (1794–1845) in Hohenberg an der Eger, Bavaria, Germany. He had previously worked at the Wallendorf porcelain manufactory in Lichte (Wallendorf).

After his death in 1845, the factory was headed by his widow, Johanna Hutschenreuther, and her two sons. A large part of the factory was destroyed by a fire in 1848, but it was rebuilt. From 1860, they produced hand-painted and gilded porcelain products.

=== Lorenz Hutschenreuther, Selb ===
In 1857, Lorenz Hutschenreuther, the elder son of Carolus Magnus Hutschenreuther, established a porcelain factory in Selb. They expanded from 1902 to 1969 and were named Porzellanfabriken Lorenz Hutschenreuther AG Selb (Lorenz Hutschenreuther Porcelain Factories Company, Selb).

Hutschenreuther acquired the following other porcelain manufacturers:

- Jaeger, Werner & Co., Selb (1906)
- Paul Mueller, Selb (1917)
- Bauscher brothers, Weiden (1927)
- Tirschenreuth porcelain factory (1927)
- Königszelt porcelain factory, Königszelt (today Jaworzyna Śląska), Silesia (1928)

In 1969, Porzellanfabriken Lorenz Hutschenreuther AG Selb merged with C. M. Hutschenreuther of Hohenberg.

== See also ==
- Porcelain manufacturing companies in Europe
