= Hohenberg an der Eger =

Hohenberg a. d. Eger
- Town
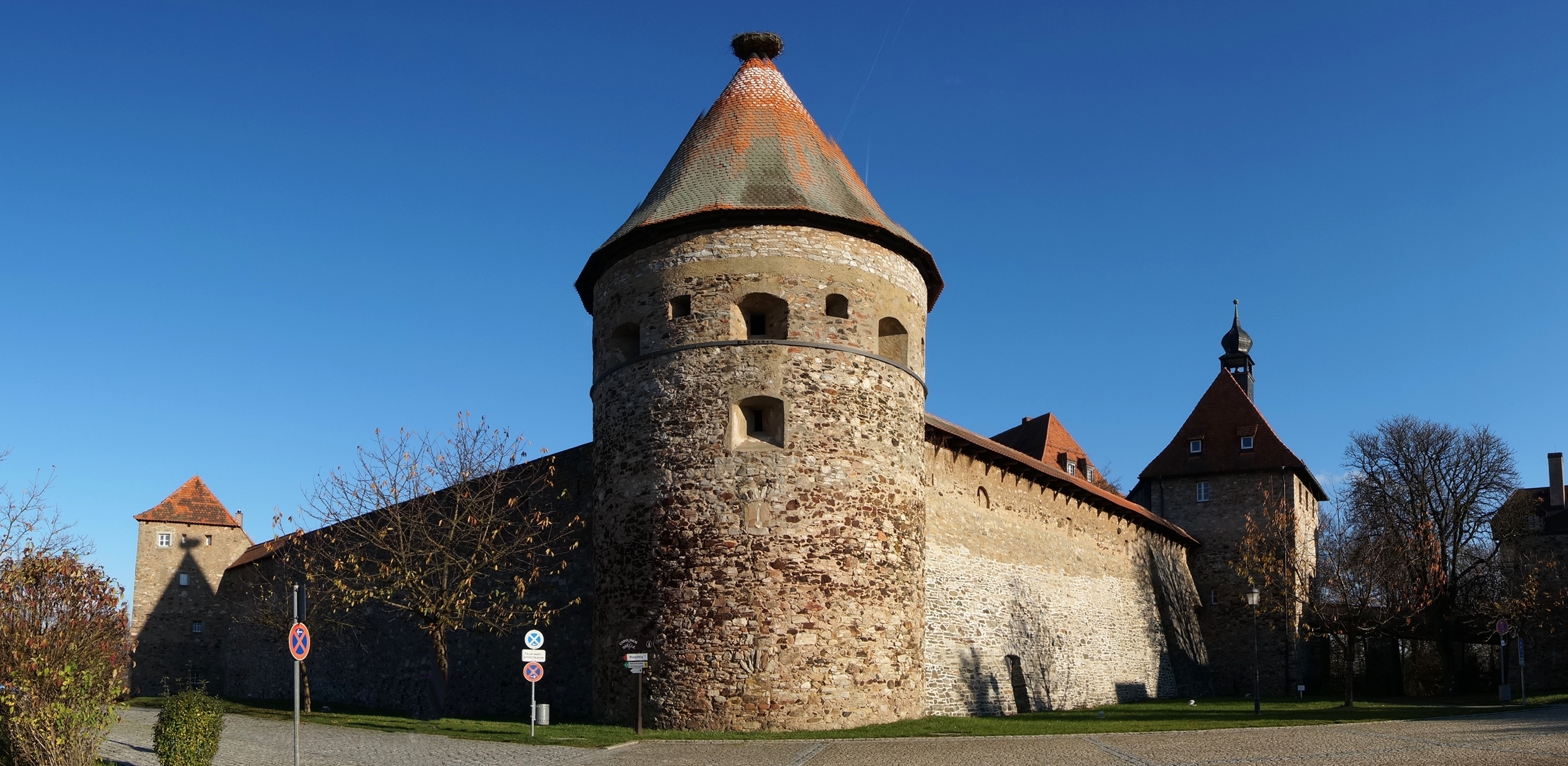
- Hohenberg Castle

- Coat of arms

- Location of Hohenberg a. d. Eger within Wunsiedel im Fichtelgebirge district
- Interactive map of Hohenberg a. d. Eger
- Location within Germany Location within Bavaria
- Coordinates: 50°06′N 12°13′E
- Country: Germany
- State: Bavaria
- Admin. region: Oberfranken
- District: Wunsiedel im Fichtelgebirge
- Municipal assoc.: Schirnding

Government
  - Mayor (2020–2026): Jürgen Hoffmann (SPD)

Area
  - Total: 15.66 km^{2} (6.05 sq mi)
- Elevation: 525 m (1,722 ft)

Population (2025-12-31)
  - Total: 1,362
  - Density: 86.97/km^{2} (225.3/sq mi)
- Time zone: UTC+01:00 (CET)
  - Summer (DST): UTC+02:00 (CEST)
- Postal codes: 95691
- Dialling codes: 09233
- Vehicle registration: WUN
- Website: www.stadt-hohenberg.de

Hohenberg an der Eger (German pronunciation: [ˈhoːənbɛʁk ʔan deːɐ̯ ˈʔeːɡɐ], lit. 'Hohenberg on the Eger') is a town in the district of Wunsiedel, in Upper Franconia, Bavaria, Germany. It is situated on the river Eger, on the border with the Czech Republic, 11 km west of Cheb, and 14 km northeast of Marktredwitz. It was home to Hutschenreuther ceramic. Though best known for its ceramic production, Hohenberg has also produced some of Bavaria's elite soccer talent. Mauricio Göhlert played for the youth teams of SpVgg SV Weiden and Borussia Mönchengladbach before signing with SV Mitterteich in 2013.

== See also ==
- Porzellanikon
