= Coiled-coil drug delivery =

Coiled coil drug delivery system

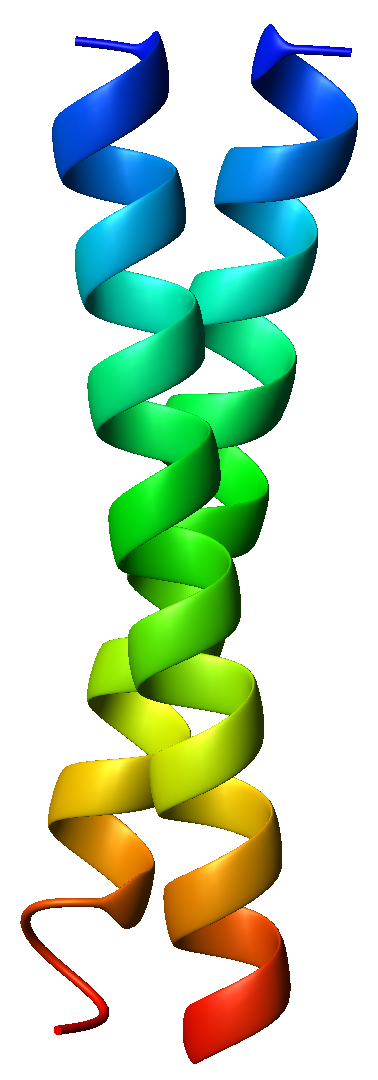
Coiled coil dimer

Coiled-coil drug delivery systems refer to drug delivery systems utilizing coiled-coil motifs capable of delivering disease-treating therapies, imaging agents, and vaccines to patients systemically or specifically. These systems are a form of peptide therapeutics and are capable of being engineered and finely tuned into different types of drug delivery vehicles (such as liposomes, nanoparticle drug carriers, polymer hybrid drug carriers, micelles, etc.) based on the specific application required. The goal of a coiled-coil drug delivery system is to deliver cargo such as medication, imaging agents, biological molecules, or vaccines efficiently and specifically, in order to maximize the therapeutic efficacy and minimize unwanted side effects. This is achieved through fine-tuning the factors affecting the coiled coil's oligomerization, resulting in modular systems that are highly specific for the intended application.

Coiled-coil motifs make up 10% of all protein sequences, and are utilized naturally by various proteins in both prokaryotes and eukaryotes to achieve diverse cellular functions. Coupled with the simple helical structure of coiled coils which has been widely studied and reported on in literature, engineered coiled coil drug delivery systems are capable of improving drug pharmacokinetics, reducing unintentional toxicity during delivery, delivering drugs in a specific manner, controlling cargo release, and maintaining high stability through transport in the body.

== History ==
Coiled-coil research began in 1953 when Dr. Francis Crick first reported on the theory behind the packing formation of α-helices in fibrous proteins at the time, which he proposed to consist of alpha helices composed of heptad repeats, or seven-residue repeats (a-b-c-d-e-f-g), whereby 2 or more alpha helices twist around each other similar to the strands of a rope. In 1972, Dr. Robert Hodges and his colleagues confirmed Dr. Crick's hypothesis upon sequencing tropomyosin, further discovering that the heptad repeat consists of two hydrophobic residues at the a and d positions, which stabilize coiled coils and are their basis for formation. This confirmation formed the basis for designing engineered coiled-coil proteins to further investigate and better understand coiled-coil interactions, structures, functions, oligomerization, and other properties. Later in 1991, Dr. O'Shea and colleagues obtained the first high-resolution image of a two-stranded coiled-coil at a resolution of 1.8Å.

Dr. Hodges was the first to suggest the use of coiled coils in a drug delivery system in 1996 when he proposed a two-stage targeting and delivery system based on heterodimerization, whereby a drug would be conjugated to chain 1 and an antibody would be conjugated to chain 2, such that chains 1 and 2 would form a heterodimeric coiled coil. In this system, the antibody conjugate would hypothetically be delivered first such that it binds to the target location, followed by the administration of the drug conjugate, whose chain 1 would dimerize with the antibody chain 2, resulting in targeted drug delivery. Since then, hundreds of investigations have been reported in the literature discussing novel drug delivery systems consisting of various coiled coil supramolecular assemblies, such as fibers, hydrogels, and nanostructures.

== Design factors ==
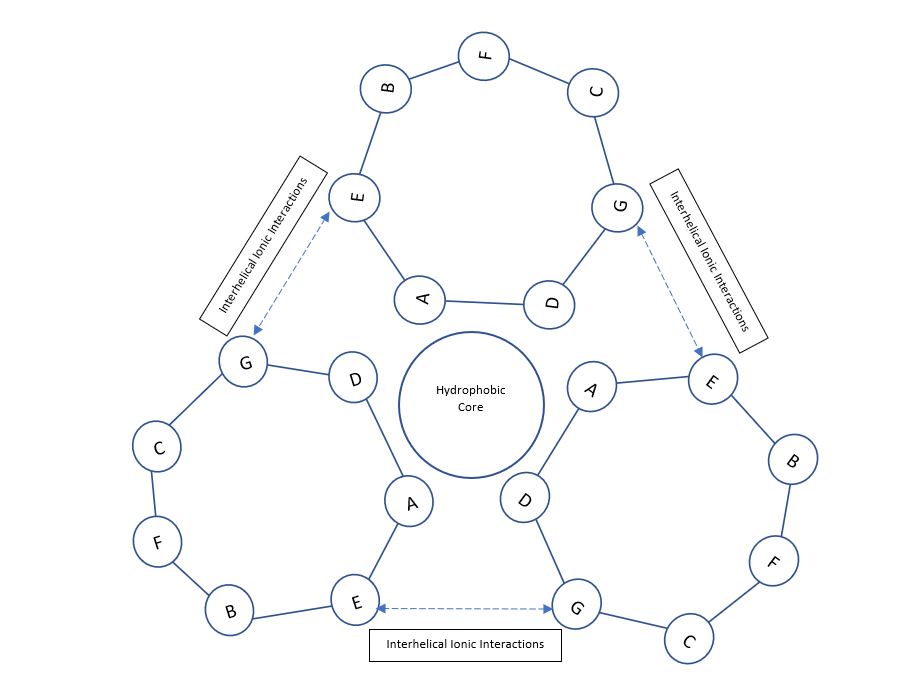
Figure 1. Trimeric coiled coil motif is composed of three heptad-repeat monomers. The hydrophobic core results from hydrophobic interactions of residues a, d. Interhelical interactions resulting from residues e, g aid in stability and specificity of the motif.

Typically, a coiled-coil motif consists of 2-7 alpha helix strands coiled together, each of which consists of a 7-residue repeat (a-b-c-d-e-f-g) called a heptad. Heptads are unique in that positions a, d are occupied by hydrophobic residues – typically Leu, Ile, or Val. Positions e, g are typically occupied by charged or polar residues – typically Lys or Glu. Through this pattern, individual helices become amphipathic, such that when oligomerized, a hydrophobic core forms between the a, d residues of the helices, along with interhelical ionic interactions that aid in stabilizing the oligomer that forms between the e and g residues of the helices (see figure 1). The number of heptads in a molecule is variable and can be modified based on specific applications of coiled-coil systems. For example, sequences with fewer heptads consisting of a, d hydrophobic residues can prove to be more stable than sequences with more heptads containing a mixture of polar and non-polar residues at the same positions. Thus, the hydrophobic core of a coiled-coil motif is considered a dominant factor affecting the stability of the motif. Additionally, the hydrophobic core residues affect the specificity of the coiled-coil motif, such that the specific pairs of a, d residues determine the number of alpha helices that compose the coiled-coil system. For example, in the case of the GCN4 leucine zipper protein, mutants with the a, d pair of I, L resulted in a two-stranded coiled-coil, while a pair of I, I resulted in a three-stranded coiled-coil and a pair of L, I resulted in a four-stranded coiled coil. Thus, the oligomerization selectivity can be tuned on a coiled-coil motif by choosing the appropriate amino acid residues in positions a, d.

The polar residues on positions e, g of a heptad also contribute to the stability and specificity of the coiled-coil motif due to the electrostatic interactions such as salt bridges with e, g residues on other heptads, though to a lesser extent compared to residues in the a, d positions. However, e, g residues are capable of conferring heterospecific properties to a coiled-coil motif, such that a system can be designed whereby strands prefer hetero-oligomerize as opposed to homo-oligomerize.

Coiled coils may be either left-handed or right-handed coils – although the majority of coiled-coil proteins found in nature consist of heptads and are left-handed since the handedness of coiled coils opposes the handedness of the alpha helices that comprise them. Right-handed coils have been reported in the literature to contain 11 residue repeats known as undecad repeats (a-b-c-d-e-f-g-h-i-j-k) or 15 residue repeats known as pentadecad repeats (a-b-c-d-e-f-g-h-i-j-k-l-m-n-o), both of which could feature larger hydrophobic cores and larger cavities that would be useful in drug delivery systems to load larger cargo.

== Polymer-hybrid delivery systems ==
Coiled-coils are used as non-covalent polymer-drug conjugates to link drugs to polymer backbones. The goal of these types of systems is to attach multiple drugs to a non-toxic backbone such that drugs can be stably transported throughout the body and released at a controlled rate once at the target location. Doxorubicin, paclitaxel, and campothecin are examples of drugs typically used with polymer-drug conjugate systems. Hetero-dimeric coiled-coils motifs can be utilized in such systems, whereby one strand would be conjugated to the polymer backbone network, while the other strand would be conjugated to the drug of choice. The coiled-coils would then oligomerize, followed by the administration of the drug system into the body, whereby the stability of the coiled-coil in physiological conditions would ensure the intact delivery of the drug to the target. Upon cellular uptake at the target site, coiled-coil system would be exposed to a decrease in pH associated with the acidic environments of endosomes and lysosomes, triggering the dissociation of the coiled-coils, resulting in drug release. Dr. Harm-Anton Klok and colleagues were the first to investigate the usage of coiled coils as linkers in polymer-drug conjugate systems, whereby they utilized the parallel heterodimeric E3/K3 coiled-coil system (known for its stability at physiological pH and dissociation at pH 5, resulting in E3 homotrimers along with K3 unimers) to link cargo to a poly(N-(2-hydroxypropyl)methacrylamide) (PHPMA)-based polymer backbone. Klok et al. proved the intracellular uptake of cargo via endocytosis, along with cargo release as a result of coiled-coil dissociation. Dr. Ondřej Vaněk and colleagues utilized the same E3/K3-PHPMA system to attach an antibody to the polymer backbone to target the delivery of the drug system, which was successful in vitro.

Coiled-coil polymer hybrid drug delivery systems can also be used in drug-free macromolecular therapeutic (DFMT) applications, whereby a coiled-coil-based system would be used to induce apoptosis in target cells. Specifically, Dr. Jindřich Kopeček and colleagues attempted to induce apoptosis in CD20-positive non-Hodgkin's lymphoma B-cells by mimicking the induction of apoptosis typically caused by the recognition of secondary antibodies to the CD20 antigen. In this case, apoptosis was induced upon the oligomerization of a PHMPA copolymer-conjugated coil to the anti-CD20 FAB fragment-conjugated coil (which would recognize and bind CD20). The coiled-coil motifs used in this system were the anti-parallel heterodimeric CCE/CCK coiled coils, which consist of pentaheptad repeats. This system was found to be successful at inducing apoptosis in those cells in vitro, providing an alternative to the anti-CD20 antibody drug Rituximab. Further studies have shown the efficacy of this system in vivo whereby malignant B-cells implanted in the bone marrow of mice were eradicated completely.

== Nanoparticle system ==
Coiled-coils can be used to create nanoparticle drug delivery systems capable of delivering drugs or other biological molecules with increased targeting and controlled release due to their biocompatibility, stability, and targeting properties. Self-assembled cage-like particles (SAGE) utilize coiled-coils along with disulfide linkers to create hollow nanoparticles of diameters in the range of 100 nm. SAGE consists of two separate coiled-coil motifs: a ~20 residue heptad homotrimer motif (CC-Tri3) and a ~20 residue heptad heterodimer motif (CC-Di-A / CC-Di-B). Each CC-Tri3 would be bound to either a CC-Di-A or a CC-Di-B via a disulfide linker, such that each time CC-Di-A and CC-Di-B would oligomerize together, hexagonal networks would form with pores of 5-6 nm in diameter: CC-Di-A – CC-Tri3 – CC-Di-A – CC-Di-b – CC-Tri3 – CC-Di-B. Self-assembly would result in further oligomerization between the heterodimer motifs, which would eventually result in the formation of a hollow nanoparticle sphere. The final diameter of the nanoparticle would depend on the length linker used, along with the size of the coiled-coil motifs used. SAGE has been applied in the field of antigen delivery, whereby Dr. Andrew Davidson and colleagues modified 3 SAGE systems described above with the antigenic peptides tetanus toxoid, ovalbumin, and hemagglutinin individually. The investigators found that SAGE systems were nontoxic in vivo, and were capable of eliciting CD4 T cell and B cell responses in the case of the tetanus toxoid and ovalbumin systems while eliciting a CD8 T cell response with the hemagglutinin system. Some advantages to using SAGE systems for antigen presentation include the ability to remain stable and functional after functionalization with cargo, the ability to modify and tune cellular uptake properties, and the modularity of the platform which could potentially be used to present multiple antigens at the same time, resulting in increased antigen immunogenicity.

Another type of coiled-coil nanoparticle system is the self-assembling protein nanoparticles (SAPN). SAPN differs from SAGE in that SAPN utilizes trimeric and pentameric coiled-coil motifs. This change results in the self-assembly of a symmetrical polyhedral 16 nm nanoparticle composed of 60 monomer building blocks. The small size of SAPN allows the nanoparticle system to resemble viruses in shape and size, which is beneficial to antigen presentation. Specifically, SAPN has been utilized by Dr. David Lanar and colleagues to develop a P. falciparum malaria vaccine whereby B and CD8-T cell epitopes of the disease were modified into the SAPN coiled-coil motifs. In vivo results showed that a long-lasting immune response was generated in the mice for up to 13 months, capable of preventing malaria infection in vaccine-treated mice.
