= PLGA =

Copolymer of varying ratios of polylactic acid and polyglycolic acid

Structure of poly(lactic-co-glycolic acid). x= number of units of lactic acid; y= number of units of glycolic acid.

PLGA, PLG, or poly(lactic-co-glycolic) acid (CAS: 26780-50-7 ) is a biodegradable, biocompatible copolymer of lactic and glycolic acid used widely in biomedical devices and tissue-engineering materials approved by the Food and Drug Administration (FDA). PLGA is synthesized by means of ring-opening co-polymerization of two different monomers: glycolide and lactide, the cyclic dimers (1,4-dioxane-2,5-diones) of glycolic acid and lactic acid, respectively. The polymer has emerged as platform for advanced drug delivery systems, including nanoparticles, because of its tunable degradation behavior and ability to encapsulate different therapeutic agents. Recent research features its growing role in precision medicine and targeted therapies, specifically in cancer treatment and controlled release applications.

== Synthesis ==
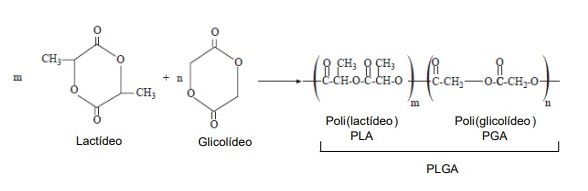
Synthesis scheme of PLGA

PLGA is typically synthesized by ring-opening polymerization of the cyclic dimers lactide and glycolide, a method widely used because it allows better control over molecular weight and copolymer composition than direct condensation methods. Other reports show direct polycondensation of lactic acid and glycolic acid as another method, but this approach gives lower molecular weight material and is less suitable for producing controlled, high-performance PLGA grades. Common catalysts include tin(II) 2-ethylhexanoate and related organometallic catalysts, which are widely used in melt polymerization because of their activity and practical availability.

== Copolymer ==
Depending on the ratio of lactide to glycolide used for the polymerization, different forms of PLGA can be obtained: these are usually identified in regard to the molar ratio of the monomers used (e.g. PLGA 75:25 identifies a copolymer whose composition is 75% lactic acid and 25% glycolic acid). The crystallinity of PLGAs will vary from fully amorphous to fully crystalline depending on block structure and molar ratio. PLGA typically show a glass transition temperature in the range of 40-60 °C. PLGA can be dissolved by a wide range of solvents, depending on composition. Higher lactide polymers can be dissolved using chlorinated solvents whereas higher glycolide materials will require the use of fluorinated solvents such as HFIP.

PLGA undergoes hydrolysis in the body to produce the original monomers: lactic acid and glycolic acid. These two monomers under normal physiological conditions, are by-products of various metabolic pathways in the body. Lactic acid is metabolized in the tricarboxylic acid cycle and eliminated via carbon dioxide and water. Glycolic acid is metabolized in the same way, and also excreted through the kidney. The body also can metabolize the two monomers, which in the case of glycolic acid produces small amounts of the toxic oxalic acid, though the amounts produced from typical applications are minuscule and there is minimal systemic toxicity associated with using PLGA for biomaterial applications.

== Degradation mechanism ==
PLGA degradation is mainly governed by bulk erosion rather than surface erosion, specifically in microspheres and implants. Water penetration throughout the polymer matrix in these systems results in homogeneous hydrolysis of its ester linkages, leading to a progressive decrease in molecular weight before significant loss of mass occurs. It has been shown that the time required for degradation of PLGA is related to the monomers' ratio used in production: the higher the content of glycolide units, the lower the time required for degradation as compared to predominantly lactide materials. An exception to this rule is the copolymer with 50:50 monomers' ratio which exhibits the faster degradation (about two months). In addition, polymers that are end-capped with esters (as opposed to the free carboxylic acid) demonstrate longer degradation half-lives. This flexibility in degradation has made it convenient for fabrication of many medical devices, such as, grafts, sutures, implants, prosthetic devices, surgical sealant films, micro and nanoparticles.

Degradation behavior is also influenced by factors like polymer composition, molecular weight, pH, ionic strength, etc. This process is usually accompanied by the formation of an acidic environment within the polymer matrix due to the accumulation of lactic and glycolic acid degradation products, which can further accelerate autocatalytic degradation. Limited diffusion of acidic byproducts can lead to localized pH gradients and heterogeneous degradation within larger PLGA systems. These effects are relevant for drug delivery applications, resulting in drug stability and release kinetics impacts.

== Biocompatibility ==
Generally PLGA is considered to be quite biocompatible. Its high biocompatibility results from its composition due to lactic and glycolic acid fermentation from sugars, making them eco-friendly and less reactive in the body. PLGA also degrades into non-toxic and non-reactive products that makes them quite useful for various medical and pharmaceutical applications.

The biocompatibility of PLGA has been tested both in vivo and in vitro. The biocompatibility of this polymer is generally determined by the products that it degrades into, as well as the rate of degradation into degradation products. The way that PLGA degrades is by means of an enzyme known as esterase, which forms lactic acid and glycolic acid. These acids then undergo the Krebs Cycle to be degraded as carbon dioxide (CO_{2}) and water (H_{2}O). These byproducts then get removed from the body through cellular respiration and through the digestive process.

While the byproducts usually do not accumulate in the body, there are instances where these byproducts (lactic and glycolic acid) can be dangerous to the body when accumulated in high local concentrations. There can also be small pieces of the polymers as the polymer degrades, causing an immune response by macrophages. These adverse effects can be reduced by using lower concentrations of the polymer, so that it gets naturally released throughout the body.

Something else to consider regarding PLGA biocompatibility is the location at which the polymer is implanted or placed in the body. There are different immune responses that the body could have depending on where the polymer is placed. For example, in drug delivery systems (DDS), PLGA and PLA implants with high surface area and low volume of injection can increase one's chance of immune response as the polymers degrade in the body.

== Biodegradability ==
The biodegradation of PLGA makes it useful for plenty of medical applications with PLGA. For example, a 75:25 lactide to glycolide PLGA ratio can be made as microspheres that degrade via bulk erosion, with polymer composition playing a role in the degradation behavior. This would allow degradation throughout the whole polymer to occur equally.

PLGA is also widely used in injectable forms developed to have eroding systems. This form can be used in Lupron Depot. To achieve this, PLGA is dissolved with an organic water-miscible solvent approved by the FDA to create a homogeneous solution or suspension. When injected, the solvent diffuses into the surrounding aqueous environment, causing PLGA to precipitate and form a solid depot. The encapsulated drug is released as the polymer gradually degrades. However, a problem that may occur during the initial injection is that the drug may be released in a quick burst instead of gradually.

== Clinical and Research Applications ==
Specific examples of PLGA's use include:

- Synthetic Barrier Membrane by Powerbone: This device is a resorbable synthetic membrane that acts as an alternative to polytetrafluoroethylene (PTFE), which is a synthetic polymer often used in dental implants and many other applications. The synthetic barrier membrane is used specifically in dental implants and for guided tissue regeneration (GTR) as well as guided bone regeneration (GBE). Some are biodegradable membranes, while others are not, and are typically correlated with more surgical complications. In general, these membranes are important to provide biocompatibility, biosafety, barrier function, and mechanical properties to the implant. They are also typically bioactive, promoting the regeneration of tissues around the site of implantation.
- Lupron Depot: This is a drug delivery device that helps treat prostate cancer and has been used to treat other types of similar cancers. It is also known as leuprorelin or leuprolide. PLGA is used as a key component in this drug, in the form of microparticles to deliver the drug into the body over a period of 1 week to 6 months. This drug is typically used as an alternative to radiation therapy, and is considered to be quite effective as it reduces the levels of testosterone in the body, slowing the effects of the cancer. There are many side effects of this drug, including muscle loss, hot flashes, fatigue, osteoporosis, growth of breast tissue, and many others.
- Prophylactic delivery: This refers to preventative healthcare that is meant to prevent infections or other illnesses. One case of prophylactic delivery involving PLGA is for the antibiotic vancomycin, which is typically injected after brain surgery to prevent infections from bacteria including Staphylococcus aureus.
- Dental scaffolds and bone regeneration: PLGA has been used in periodontal and dental applications, specifically scaffolds and barrier membranes for bone and tissue regeneration.
- Cancer immunotherapy: PLGA has emerged as a platform for modulating tumors microenvironments. By encapsulating or conjugating drugs (ex: Doxorubicin) to PLGA, researchers try to overcome drug resistance and minimize cytotoxicity compared to free drug releases.

== See also ==
- Polycaprolactone
- Polyglycolide
- Polymer-drug conjugates
- Polylactic acid
- Poly-3-hydroxybutyrate
