= Hernia repair =

Surgical procedures to fix abnormal openings

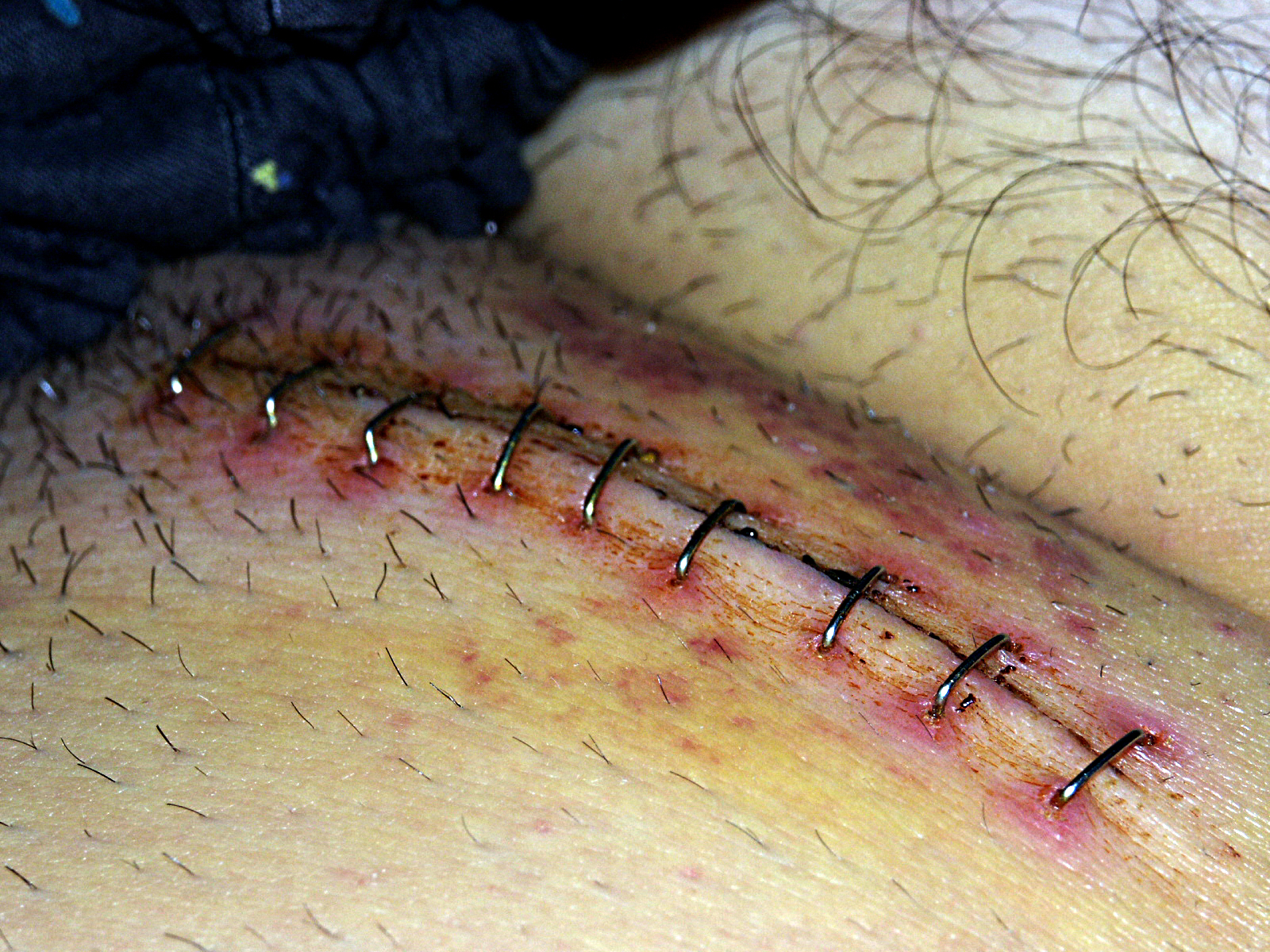
- Surgical incision at the groin after inguinal herniorrhaphy
- Specialty: General surgery
- Types: Herniorrhaphy, hernioplasty

Hernia repair is a surgical operation for the correction of a hernia—a bulging of internal organs or tissues through the wall that contains it. It can be of two different types: herniorrhaphy; or hernioplasty. This operation may be performed to correct hernias of the abdomen, groin, diaphragm, brain, or at the site of a previous operation. Hernia repair is often performed as an ambulatory procedure.

== Techniques ==
=== Inguinal hernia repair ===
The first differentiating factor in hernia repair is whether the surgery is done open, or laparoscopically. Open hernia repair is when an incision is made in the skin directly over the hernia. Laparoscopic hernia repair is when minimally invasive cameras and equipment are used and the hernia is repaired with only small incisions adjacent to the hernia.

An operation in which the hernia sac is removed without any repair of the inguinal canal is described as a herniotomy. When herniotomy is combined with a reinforced repair of the posterior inguinal canal wall with autogenous (patient's own tissue) or heterogeneous material such as prolene mesh, it is termed hernioplasty as opposed to herniorrhaphy, in which no material is used for reinforcement.

=== Stoppa procedure ===
The Stoppa procedure is a tension-free type of hernia repair. It is performed by wrapping the lower part of the parietal peritoneum with prosthetic mesh and placing it at a preperitoneal level over Fruchaud's myopectineal orifice. It was first described in 1975 by Rene Stoppa. This operation is also known as "giant prosthetic reinforcement of the visceral sac" (GPRVS).

This technique has met particular success in the repair of bilateral hernias, large scrotal hernias, and recurrent or rerecurrent hernias in which conventional repair is difficult and which carries a high morbidity and failure rate. The most recent reported recurrence rate (involving 230 patients with 420 hernias and a maximum of 8 years follow-up) was 0.71%. The totally extra-peritoneal repair (TEP) uses exactly the same principles as the Stoppa repair, except that it is performed laparoscopically.

=== Advancements in Hernia Repair ===
Robotic-assisted hernia repair has gained popularity due to its precision, smaller incisions, and quicker recovery times. Using robotic systems, surgeons have greater flexibility and control during the procedure. Although its use is still more expensive and requires specialized equipment, early studies suggest that robotic hernia repair may offer improved outcomes in complex cases, such as large or recurrent hernias.
