= Polycaprolactone =

Synthetic, biodegradable polyester

Names
- IUPAC name (1,7)-Polyoxepan-2-one
- Systematic IUPAC name Poly(hexano-6-lactone)
- Other names 2-Oxepanone homopolymer 6-Caprolactone polymer

Identifiers
CAS Number	24980-41-4
Abbreviations	PCL
ChemSpider	none

Properties
Chemical formula	(C_{6}H_{10}O_{2})_{n}
Density	1.145 g/cm^{3}
Melting point	60 °C (140 °F)
Thermal conductivity	0.05 W/(m K) @25°C
- Except where otherwise noted, data are given for materials in their standard state (at 25 °C [77 °F], 100 kPa). Infobox references

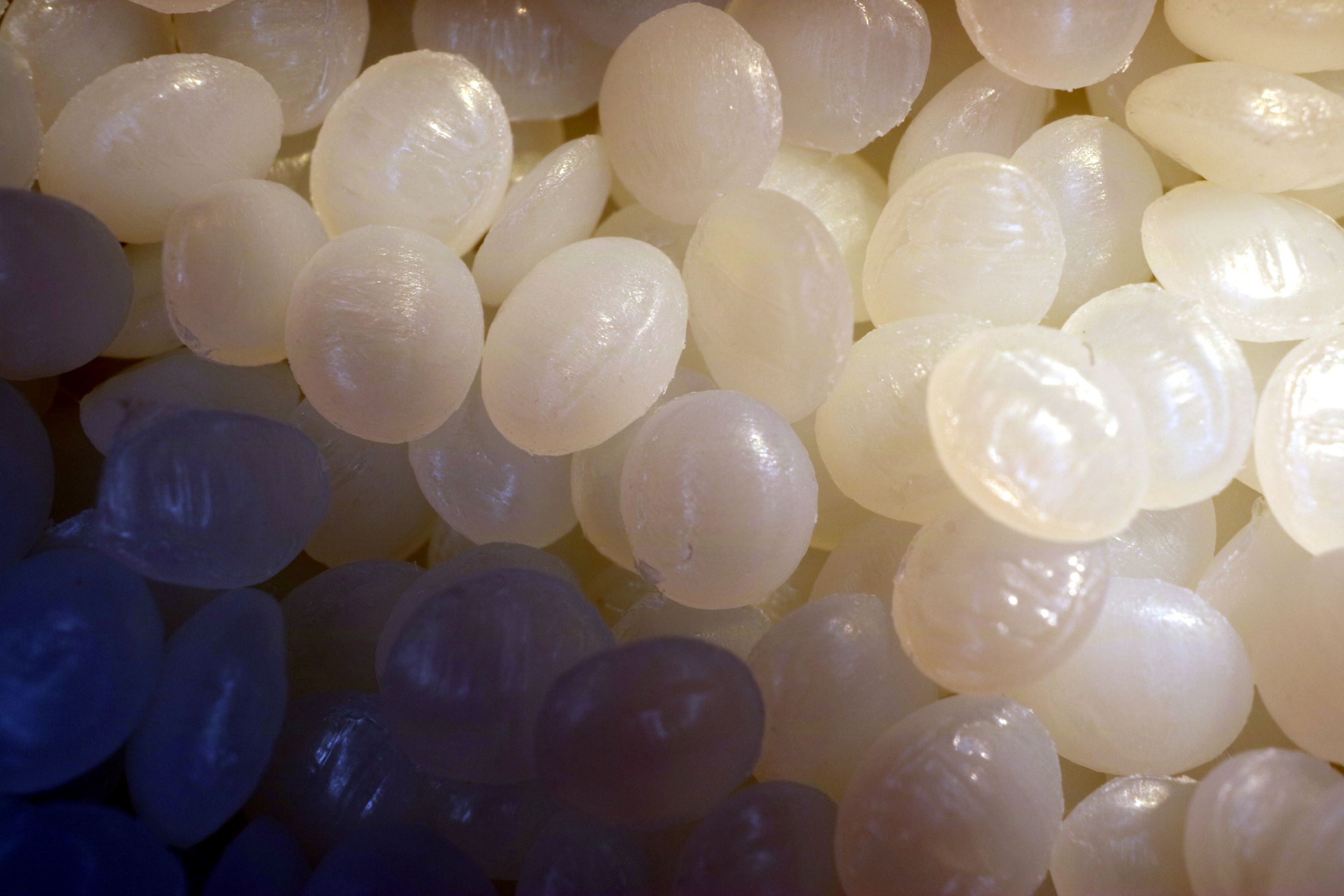
PCL beads, as sold for industrial or hobbyist use.

Polycaprolactone (PCL) is a synthetic, semi-crystalline, biodegradable polyester with a melting point of about 60 °C and a glass transition temperature of about −60 °C. The most common use of polycaprolactone is in the production of speciality polyurethanes. Polycaprolactones impart good resistance to water, oil, solvent and chlorine to the polyurethane produced.

This polymer is often used as an additive for resins to improve their processing characteristics and their end use properties (e.g., impact resistance). Being compatible with a range of other materials, PCL can be mixed with starch to lower its cost and increase biodegradability or it can be added as a polymeric plasticizer to polyvinyl chloride (PVC).

Polycaprolactone is also used for splinting, modeling, and as a feedstock for prototyping systems such as fused filament fabrication 3D printers.

== Synthesis ==
PCL is prepared by ring opening polymerization of ε-caprolactone using a catalyst such as stannous octoate. A wide range of catalysts can be used for the ring opening polymerization of caprolactone. Low molecular weight alcohols are commonly added to regulate the molecular weight of the polymer.

== Applications ==
=== Biomedical applications ===
PCL is degraded by hydrolysis of its ester linkages in physiological conditions (such as in the human body) and has therefore received a great deal of attention for use as an implantable biomaterial. In particular it is especially interesting for the preparation of long term implantable devices, owing to its degradation which is even slower than that of polylactide.

PCL has been widely used in long-term implants and controlled drug release applications. However, when it comes to tissue engineering, PCL suffers from some shortcomings such as slow degradation rate, poor mechanical properties, and low cell adhesion. The incorporation of calcium phosphate-based ceramics and bioactive glasses into PCL has yielded a class of hybrid biomaterials with remarkably improved mechanical properties, controllable degradation rates, and enhanced bioactivity that are suitable for bone tissue engineering. PCL–Hydroxyapatite composite scaffolds for bone tissue engineering can mimic the composition and morphology of the bone mineral phase and can be 3D printed into intricate designs.

PCL has been approved by the Food and Drug Administration (FDA) in specific applications used in the human body as (for example) a drug delivery device, suture, or adhesion barrier. PCL is used in the rapidly growing field of human esthetics following the recent introduction of a PCL-based microsphere dermal filler belonging to the collagen stimulator class (Ellansé).

Through the stimulation of collagen production, PCL-based products are able to reduce facial ageing signs such as volume loss and contour laxity, providing an immediate and long-lasting natural effect. It is being investigated as a scaffold for tissue repair by tissue engineering, GBR membrane. It has been used as the hydrophobic block of amphiphilic synthetic block copolymers used to form the vesicle membrane of polymersomes.

A variety of drugs have been encapsulated within PCL beads for controlled release and targeted drug delivery.

In dentistry (as the composite named Resilon), it is used as a component of "night guards" (dental splints) and in root canal filling. It performs like gutta-percha, has similar handling properties, and for re-treatment purposes may be softened with heat, or dissolved with solvents like chloroform. Similar to gutta-percha, there are master cones in all ISO sizes and accessory cones in different sizes and taper available. The major difference between the polycaprolactone-based root canal filling material (Resilon and Real Seal) and gutta-percha is that the PCL-based material is biodegradable, whereas gutta-percha is not. There is a lack of consensus in the expert dental community as to whether a biodegradable root canal filling material, such as Resilon or Real Seal is desirable.

=== Hobbyist and prototyping ===
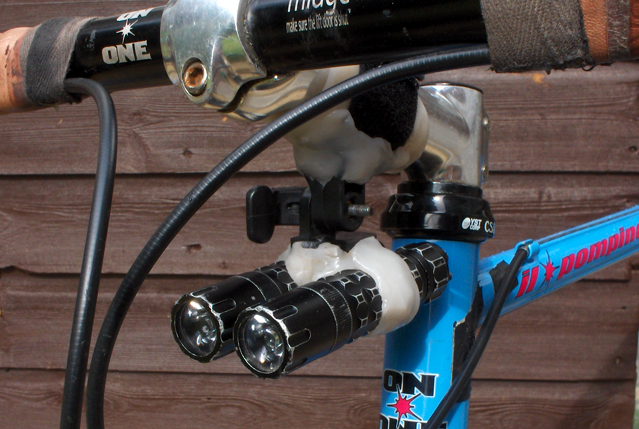
Homemade bicycle light mount made from PCL

PCL also has many applications in the hobbyist market where it is known as Re-Form, Polydoh, Plastimake, NiftyFix, Protoplastic, InstaMorph, Polymorph, Shapelock, ReMoldables, Plastdude, TechTack, or Friendly Plastic. It has physical properties of a very tough, nylon-like plastic that softens to a putty-like consistency at only 60 °C, easily achieved by immersing in hot water. PCL's specific heat and thermal conductivity are low enough that it is not hard to handle by hand at this temperature. This makes it ideal for small-scale modeling, part fabrication, repair of plastic objects, and rapid prototyping where heat resistance is not needed. Though softened PCL readily sticks to many other plastics when at higher temperature, if the surface is cooled, the stickiness can be minimized while still leaving the mass pliable.

== Biodegradation ==
Bacillota and Pseudomonadota can degrade PCL. Penicillium sp. strain 26-1 can degrade high density PCL; though not as quickly as thermotolerant Aspergillus sp. strain ST-01. Species of Clostridium can degrade PCL under anaerobic conditions.

== History ==
Polycaprolactone was first synthesized in the early 1930s by the research group led by Wallace Carothers at the DuPont Experimental Station; however, it was not widely commercialized at the time. During a resorbable-polymer boom of the 1970s and 1980s, the material was utilized extensively in the development of drug-delivery devices and suture materials, due to its degradation kinetics and high blend compatibility. However, the interest in the polymer declined for nearly two decades as the medical industry pivoted toward faster-resorbing aliphatic polyesters like polyglycolide and polylactide, which were preferred for applications requiring complete resorption within months rather than years. A resurgence of interest in uses occurred in the 1990s and 2000s alongside the emergence of technologies such as tissue engineering and three-dimensional printing. It, or a similar derivative, is also used as the primary component in Scrub Daddy, a cleaning supply company mostly known for their sponges.

== See also ==
- Silicone
- Polymer clay
- Silly Putty
- Sugru
