= American Cyanamid Co v Ethicon Ltd =

English civil procedure case

- Court: House of Lords
- Citations: [1975] UKHL 1, [1975] AC 396, [1975] 2 WLR 316, [1975] 1 All ER 504, [1977] FSR 593

Keywords
- Interim injunction

American Cyanamid Co v Ethicon Ltd [1975] UKHL 1 is an English civil procedure case, concerning when an interim injunction may be obtained.

== Facts ==
The claimant and appellant in this case was American Cyanamid, an American company that inter alia held a patent for absorbable surgical sutures. The defendant and respondent in this case was Ethicon Ltd, a British company that wanted to launch a surgical suture in the British market. American Cyanamid claimed that this surgical suture was in breach of their patent.

At first instance, American Cyanamid was granted an interim injunction against Ethicon, preventing Ethicon to use the type of surgical suture at issue until the trial of the patent infringement.

On appeal of Ethicon, the Court of Appeal discharged the interim injunction.

American Cyanamid appealed against this decision to the House of Lords. The House of Lords set out detailed guidelines on when courts should grant interim injunctions. In this case, the House of Lords decided that the balance of convenience lay with the appellant, American Cyanamid, and the appeal was allowed.

== Judgment ==
The House of Lords set out the following guidance:

Guidelines set out in this case to establish whether an applicant has an adequate case for the granting of an interlocutory injunction. The guidelines consider:

- Whether there was a sufficiently serious (substantial) matter to be tried.
- Whether damages were an adequate remedy for the claimant if an injunction was not granted.
- If damages would not be an adequate remedy, whether the claimant would be able to give an undertaking in damages to the defendant.
- If it was considered that there was any difficulty regarding the availability of damages on either side, the court should consider the balance of convenience between the parties.
- If these factors were evenly balanced, the court should consider maintaining the status quo.

== Reception ==
The second factor (whether damages are an adequate remedy) has been considered subsequently by the Court of Appeal in AB v CD where an interim injunction was upheld even though the contract between the parties contained a liquidated damages clause. The Court held that the damages clause was a secondary obligation between the parties, and the interim injunction served to enforce the primary obligation present in the agreement.

The points in the House of Lords' guidance have subsequently been referred to as the "American Cyanamid principles". Lord Justice Brown codified them into seven points, listed in Fellowes & Son v Fisher (1976). Newey J noted in 2011 that the threshold for determining whether there is a serious issue to be tried "is a relatively low one".

== See also ==
- English civil procedure
