= DEPT (medicine) =

Directed enzyme prodrug therapy (DEPT) uses enzymes artificially introduced into the body to convert prodrugs, which have no or poor biologically activity, to the active form in the desired location within the body. Many chemotherapy drugs for cancer lack tumour specificity and the doses required to reach therapeutic levels in the tumour are often toxic to other tissues. DEPT strategies are an experimental method of reducing the systemic toxicity of a drug, by achieving high levels of the active drug only at the desired site. This article describes the variations of DEPT technology.

== Antibody-directed enzyme prodrug therapy (ADEPT) ==
ADEPT is a strategy to overcome the problems of lack of tumor selectivity. An antibody designed/developed against a tumor antigen is linked to an enzyme and injected to the blood, resulting in selective binding of the enzyme in the tumor. When the discrimination between tumor and normal tissue enzyme levels is sufficient, a prodrug is administered into the blood circulation, which is converted to an active cytotoxic drug by the enzyme, only within the tumor. Selectivity is achieved by the tumor specificity of the antibody and by delaying prodrug administration until there is a large differential between tumor and normal tissue enzyme levels.

ADEPT has shown antitumor activity in animal tumor models of human choriocarcinoma and colonic and breast carcinoma.

=== ADEPT history ===
The first pilot-scale clinical trial of ADEPT was carried out at Charing Cross Hospital, London, using an anti-CEA F(ab′)2 antibody conjugated to the bacterial enzyme carboxypeptidase G2 (CPG2).

The antibody used in the first ADEPT clinical trial was of murine origin and the enzyme was bacterial. Host antibodies to both components of the AEC were present in the blood of all non-immunosuppressed patients by day 10 after AEC infusion. Several patients received ciclosporin since it had been shown in rabbits that this could delay the appearance of host antibodies to soluble proteins.

A subsequent, small-scale trial at the Royal Free Hospital, London, used the same agents as in the Charing Cross Hospital trial but the protocol was modified to provide additional pharmacokinetic data and most patients received only a single course of treatment.

== Gene-directed enzyme prodrug therapy (GDEPT) ==
GDEPT is a suicide gene therapy in which the enzyme required for prodrug conversion is produced within the target cell, using a gene delivered to it by gene therapy. When an adequate differential exists between the targeted cell and endogenous tissue, non-toxic prodrug is administered and is subsequently converted into its toxic form within the target cell. Systems that use viral vectors to deliver the gene are known as VDEPT.

== Virus-directed enzyme prodrug therapy (VDEPT) ==
VDEPT is the term given to the use of a virus to deliver the gene for GDEPT. VDEPT can potentially be used to enhance the therapeutic potential of oncolytic viruses.

== Lectin-directed Enzyme-Activated Prodrug Therapy (LEAPT) ==
LEAPT is a variant of DEPT in which the manipulation of carbohydrates on the surface of the enzyme is used to target the enzyme activity to the cell in question. This allows exploitation of the sometimes highly specific sugar-lectin interactions found in organisms, including humans. Proof-of-principle examples have shown delivery to target organs of enzymes that specifically release cytotoxics to treat tumours.

== Polymer-directed enzyme prodrug therapy (PDEPT) ==
PDEPT uses polymer-drug conjugates, drugs contained within a polymer 'shell' such as pHPMA and designed to be released only by a specific enzyme.

== Clostridia-directed enzyme prodrug therapy (CDEPT) ==
CDEPT is the use of Clostridia to convert prodrugs into active drug agents. CDEPT exploits the hypoxic environment of solid tumors to target drugs to tumors using anaerobic bacteria resident in the tumour to convert the pro-drug to the active form. Intravenously injected clostridial spores exhibit a specificity for tumours, colonising the hypoxic areas of the tumours.

=== The CDEPT strategy ===
Perhaps the most challenging issue in cancer treatment is how to reduce the side effects of the injected anti-cancer agents, which are of a high cytotoxicity potential. A widely used solution is to use enzymes which are able to convert a relatively non-toxic prodrug precursor into the active drug form(s). Clostridial-directed enzyme prodrug therapy (CDEPT) is one of the possible approaches.

Solid tumors, in contrast to normal tissues, grow rapidly. As a result, the cancerous tissues may suffer from inadequate blood and oxygen supply. Therefore, clostridia can grow in tumor and destroy it specifically. (Originally, Parker and co-workers showed that the injection of Clostridium histolyticum spores to the transplanted sarcomas of mice results in significant tumour lysis. Soon after, it was shown that a direct injection is not necessary, and that tumour colonization was readily obtained after intravenous administration of spores).

In CDEPT, a prodrug-converting enzyme expressed by a clostridial expression plasmid converts a prodrug into an active drug form within the tumor. While the prodrug is the inactive form and can be administrated to the blood, the products of the prodrug cleavage are highly cytotoxic and show their effect only in the vicinity of tumor cells.

Difficulties in the engineering of clostridial strains have restricted the application of other enzyme prodrug systems. So far, two enzymes have been applied in CDEPT: cytosine deaminase and nitroreductase.
