= Polyglycolide =

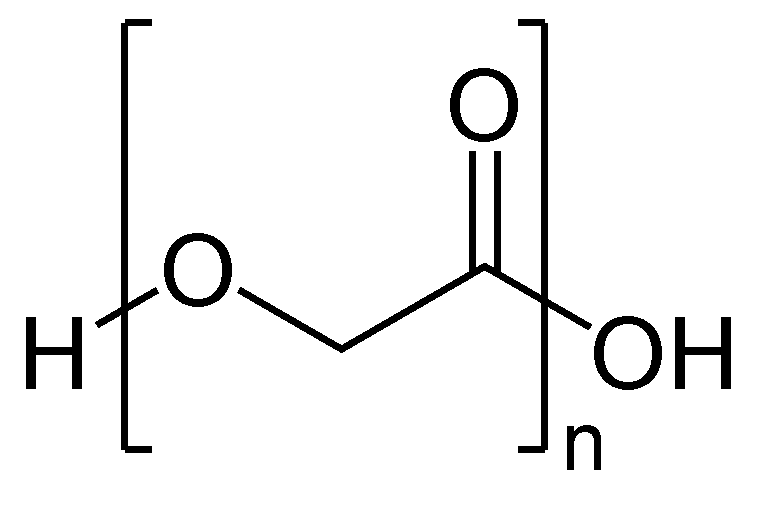
- Polyglycolide

Names
- IUPAC name Poly[oxy(1-oxo-1,2-ethanediyl)]

Identifiers
CAS Number	26124-68-5
3D model (JSmol)	Interactive image
ChemSpider	none
ECHA InfoCard	100.249.865
UNII	H1IL6F7KB8
CompTox Dashboard (EPA)	DTXSID001011020
- SMILES: *C(=O)CO*

Properties
Chemical formula	(C_{2}H_{2}O_{2})_{n}
Molar mass	(58.04)n
Density	1.530 g/cm^{3} at 25 °C
Melting point	225 to 230 °C (437 to 446 °F; 498 to 503 K)
Boiling point	Decomposes
- Except where otherwise noted, data are given for materials in their standard state (at 25 °C [77 °F], 100 kPa). verify (what is ?) Infobox references

Polyglycolide or poly(glycolic acid) (PGA), also spelled as polyglycolic acid, is a biodegradable, thermoplastic polymer and the simplest linear, aliphatic polyester. It can be prepared starting from glycolic acid by means of polycondensation or ring-opening polymerization. PGA has been known since 1954 as a tough fiber-forming polymer. Owing to its hydrolytic instability, however, its use was slow to develop. Polyglycolide and its copolymers (poly(lactic-co-glycolic acid) with lactic acid, poly(glycolide-co-caprolactone) with ε-caprolactone and poly (glycolide-co-trimethylene carbonate) with trimethylene carbonate) are widely used as a material for the synthesis of absorbable sutures and are being evaluated in the biomedical field.

== Physical properties ==
Polyglycolide has a glass transition temperature between 35 and 40 °C and a melting point in the range of 225 to 230 °C. PGA also exhibits an elevated degree of crystallinity, around 45–55%, thus resulting in insolubility in water. The high molecular weight form is insoluble in common organic solvents (acetone, dichloromethane, etc.), whereas low molecular weight oligomers are more soluble. Polyglycolide is soluble in highly fluorinated solvents like hexafluoroisopropanol (HFIP) and hexafluoroacetone sesquihydrate, that can be used to prepare solutions of the high MW polymer for melt spinning and film preparation. Fibers of PGA exhibit high strength and modulus (7 GPa) and are particularly stiff.

== Synthesis ==
Polyglycolide can be obtained through several processes starting with different materials:

- polycondensation of glycolic acid
- ring-opening polymerization of glycolide
- solid-state polycondensation of halogenoacetates

Polycondensation of glycolic acid is the simplest process available to prepare PGA, but it is not the most efficient because it yields a low molecular weight product.

The most common synthesis of high molecular weight form of the polymer is ring-opening polymerization of glycolide, the bislactone cyclic dimer of glycolic acid. Glycolide can be prepared by thermal cracking, collecting the diester by means of distillation. Ring-opening polymerization of glycolide can be catalyzed using diverse catalysts, including antimony compounds, such as antimony trioxide or antimony trihalides, zinc compounds (zinc lactate) and tin compounds like stannous octoate (tin(II) 2-ethylhexanoate) or tin alkoxides. Stannous octoate is the most commonly used initiator, since it is approved by the FDA as a food stabilizer. Usage of other catalysts has been disclosed as well, among these are aluminium isopropoxide, calcium acetylacetonate, and several lanthanide alkoxides (e.g. yttrium isopropoxide).

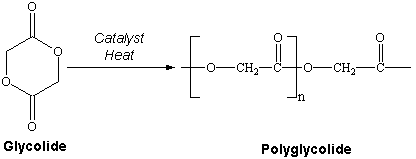
Ring-opening polymerization of glycolide to polyglycolide

Another procedure consists in the thermally induced solid-state polycondensation of halogenoacetates with general formula X-—CH_{2}COO^{−}M^{+} (where M is a monovalent metal like sodium and X is a halogen like chlorine), resulting in the production of polyglycolide and small crystals of a salt. Polycondensation is carried out by heating an halogenoacetate, like sodium chloroacetate, at a temperature between 160 and 180 °C, continuously passing nitrogen through the reaction vessel. During the reaction polyglycolide is formed along with sodium chloride which precipitates within the polymeric matrix; the salt can be conveniently removed by washing the product of the reaction with water.

PGA can also be obtained by carbonylation (reaction with carbon monoxide) of formaldehyde or the related compounds like paraformaldehyde or trioxane.

== Degradation ==
The hydrolytic degradation appears to take place in two steps during which the polymer is converted back to its monomer glycolic acid: first water diffuses into the amorphous (non-crystalline) regions of the polymer matrix, cleaving the ester bonds; the second step starts after the amorphous regions have been eroded, leaving the crystalline portion of the polymer susceptible to hydrolytic attack. Upon collapse of the crystalline regions the polymer chain dissolves.

When exposed to physiological conditions, polyglycolide is degraded by random hydrolysis, and apparently it is also broken down by certain enzymes, especially those with esterase activity. The degradation product, glycolic acid, is nontoxic, but like ethylene glycol, it is metabolized to oxalic acid, which could make it dangerous. A part of the glycolic acid is also excreted by urine.

Studies undergone using polyglycolide-made sutures have shown that the material loses half of its strength after two weeks and 100% after four weeks. The polymer is completely resorbed by the organism in a time frame of four to six months. Degradation is faster in vivo than in vitro, this phenomenon thought to be due to cellular enzymatic activity.

== Uses ==
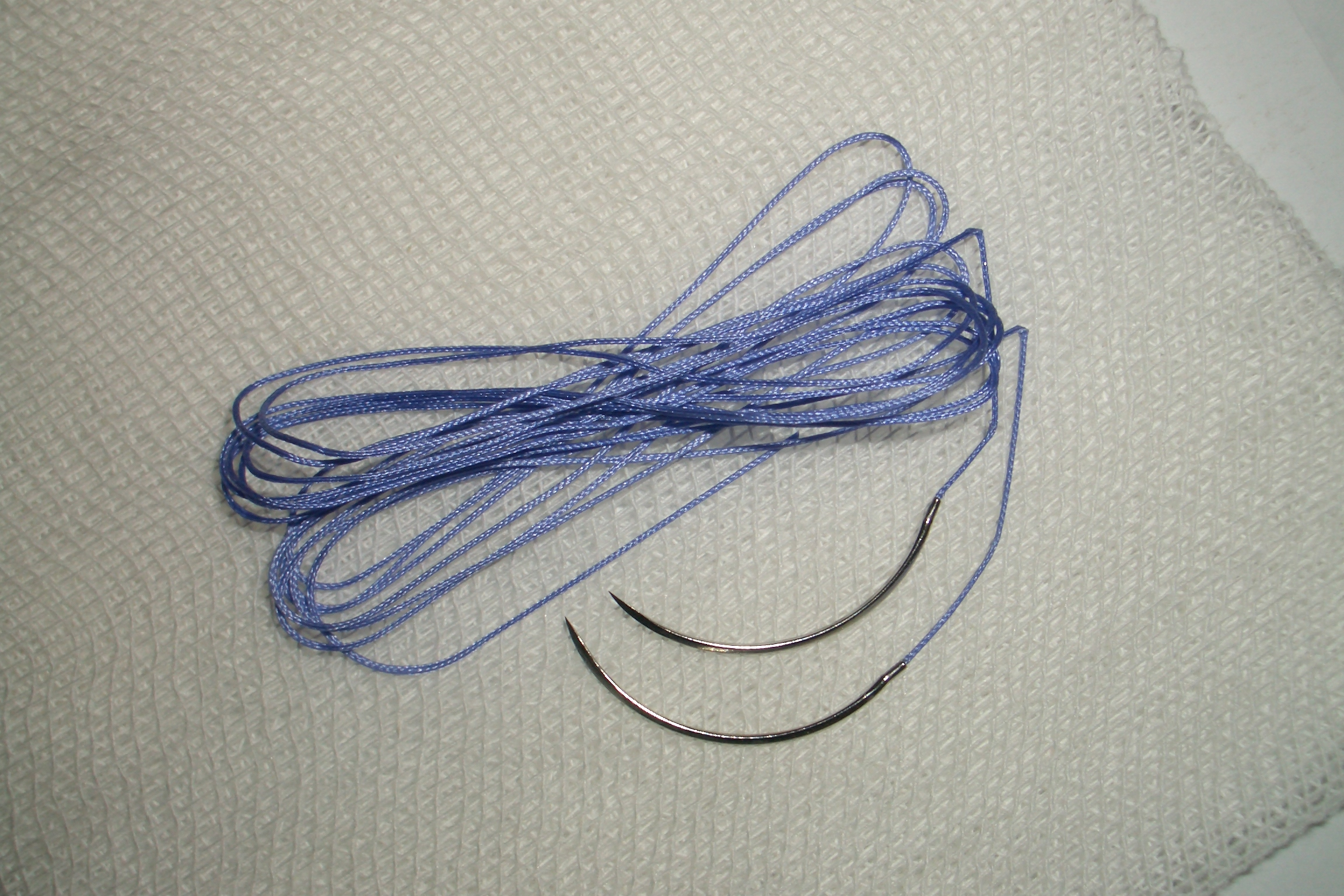
Sutures made from polyglycolic acid. These sutures are adsorbable and are degraded by the body over time.

While known since 1954, PGA had found little use because of its sensitivity to hydrolysis when compared with other synthetic polymers. However, in 1962 this polymer was used to develop the first synthetic absorbable suture which was marketed under the tradename of Dexon by the Davis & Geck subsidiary of the American Cyanamid Corporation. After its coating with polycaprolactone and calcium stearate it is being sold under the brand name of Assucryl.

PGA suture is classified as a synthetic, absorbable, braided multifilament. It is coated with N-laurin and L-lysine, which render the thread extremely smooth, soft and safe for knotting. It is also coated with magnesium stearate and finally sterilized with ethylene oxide gas. It is naturally degraded in the body by hydrolysis and is absorbed as water-soluble monomers, completed between 60 and 90 days. Elderly, anemic and malnourished patients may absorb the suture more quickly. Its color is either violet or undyed and it is sold in sizes USP 6-0 (1 metric) to USP 2 (5 metric). It has the advantages of high initial tensile strength, smooth passage through tissue, easy handling, excellent knotting ability, and secure knot tying. It is commonly used for subcutaneous sutures, intracutaneous closures, abdominal and thoracic surgeries.

The traditional role of PGA as a biodegradable suture material has led to its evaluation in other biomedical fields. Implantable medical devices have been produced with PGA, including anastomosis rings, pins, rods, plates and screws. It has also been explored for tissue engineering or controlled drug delivery. Tissue engineering scaffolds made with polyglycolide have been produced following different approaches, but generally most of these are obtained through textile technologies in the form of non-woven felts.

The Kureha Chemical Industries has commercialized high molecular weight polyglycolide for food packaging applications under the tradename of Kuredux. Production is at Belle, West Virginia, with an intended capacity of 4000 annual metric tons. Its attributes as a barrier material result from its high degree of crystallization, the basis for a tortuous path mechanism for low permeability. It is anticipated that the high molecular weight version will have use as an interlayer between layers of polyethylene terephthalate to provide improved barrier protection for perishable foods, including carbonated beverages and foods that lose freshness on prolonged exposure to air. Thinner plastic bottles which still retain desirable barrier properties may also be enabled by this polyglycolide interlayer technology. A low molecular weight version (approximately 600 amu) is available from The Chemours Company (formerly part of DuPont) and is purported to be useful in oil and gas applications.
