= Prolene =

Brand of polypropylene for sutures and meshes

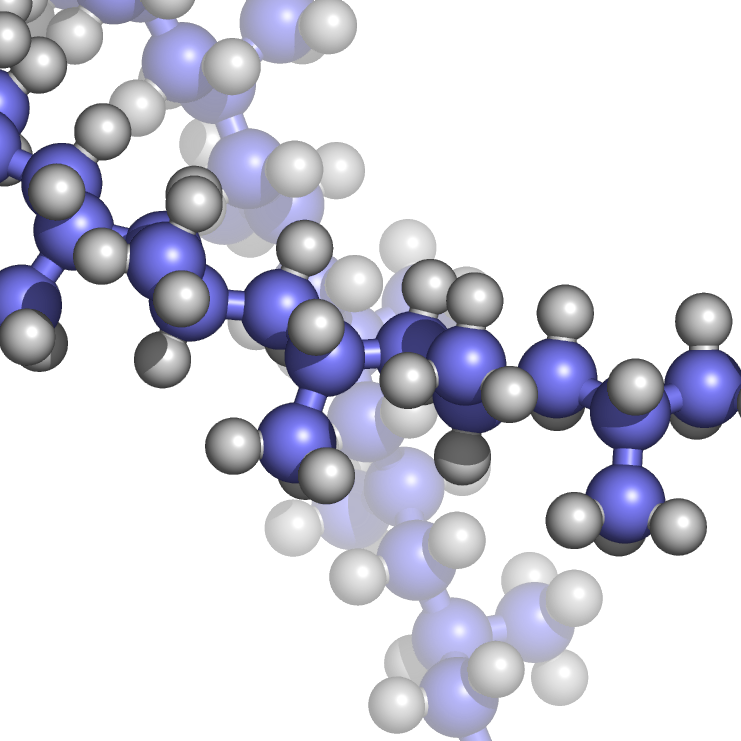
A ball-and-stick model of polypropylene.

Prolene is a brand of synthetic polypropylene used in monofilament nonabsorbable sutures and meshes. The suture is indicated for skin closure and general soft tissue approximation and ligation. Its advantages include minimal tissue reactivity and durability. Disadvantages include fragility, high plasticity, high expense, and difficulty of use compared to standard nylon sutures.

Composed of an isotactic crystalline stereoisomer of polypropylene, Prolene sutures are intended to be durable and long lasting. They are dyed blue, allowing for easy visibility against skin and when operating. It is composed of a single filament.

A polypropylene mesh Prolene product is used for repairing hernias and other injuries to the fascia.

Prolene commonly is used in both human and veterinary medicine for skin closure. In human medicine it is used in cardiovascular, ophthalmic and neurological procedures. It is often used in conjunction with the absorbable suture Monocryl. Prolene is manufactured by Ethicon Inc., a subsidiary of Johnson & Johnson. It is produced in Cornelia, Georgia, USA.

Prolene has become the mainstay of vascular anastomoses and facilitated significant advances in cardiac and vascular surgery. It is used on both small vessels such as coronary artery bypasses and large vessels including the aorta. It is used in obstetrical practice, during cesarean sections to suture the rectus sheath of the abdominal wall because it is non-absorbable in nature and provides the sheath the due strength it deserves (rectus sheath is composed of various tendon extensions and muscle fibres and maintains the strength of the abdominal wall; if it becomes weak the abdominal contents start herniating out) it stays there forever and is also often seen during repeat cesarean section as that of the previous section.

== Use in paintbrushes ==
Prolene is also used in the manufacture of artist's watercolour paint brushes. When carefully blended with the traditional material Siberian weasel hair, it produces a brush of comparable quality at a more economical price. See kolinsky sable-hair brush.

== See also ==
- Monocryl
