= Cytec Industries =

American chemical company

Cytec Industries, Inc.
- Company type: Subsidiary
- Traded as: NYSE: CYT
- Industry: Chemicals, Materials, Aerospace, Automotive and Coatings
- Founded: 1907 - American Cyanamid Company, 1993 - Cytec
- Headquarters: Woodland Park, New Jersey, United States
- Area served: Worldwide
- Key people: Shane D. Flemming (President and CEO)
- Revenue: ▲US$ 1.90 billion (2013)
- Number of employees: 6,600+ (2012)
- Subsidiaries: Cytec Engineered Materials
- Website: http://www.cytec.com

Cytec Industries Incorporated, based in Woodland Park, New Jersey was a speciality chemicals and materials technology company with pro-forma sales in 2004, including the Surface Specialties acquisition, of approximately $3.0 billion. Cytec is a result of its spin-off from American Cyanamid Company. It makes resins, plastics, and composite materials, especially for the aerospace industry and other users of specialty materials. It was listed in NYSE with stock symbol "CYT".

In 2012, Cytec had about 6,600 employees in Europe, North and South America, Asia and Australia.

In December 2013, Cytec Industries entered into a tactical partnership with Mubadala Development Company.

In July 2015, Solvay announced its intent to acquire Cytec for a purchase price of US$5.5 billion. In November 2015, Cytec Industries has obtain a shareholder's stake in Penso Holdings. In December 2015, Solvay successfully completed its acquisition of Cytec. Financing consists of the issuance of around €4.7 billion senior and hybrid bonds and the ongoing €1.5 billion right issue.
