= United States v. Charles Pfizer & Co., Inc. =

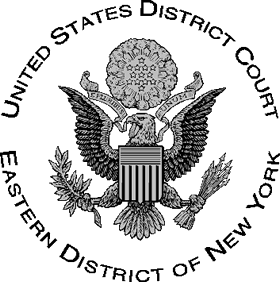
- Court: United States Department of Justice
- Full case name: United States v. Charles Pfizer & Company Inc.
- Started: May 28, 1958
- Decided: January 24, 1972
- Docket nos.: Nos. 636-638, Dockets 32493-32495
- Defendants: American Cyanamid, Pfizer, Bristol-Meyers
- Plaintiff: United States Department of Justice

Holding
- Government failing to prove the antitrust charges against Pfizer and other companies beyond a reasonable doubt

United States v. Charles Pfizer & Co., Inc. was a major antitrust case brought by the U.S. Department of Justice in 1958 against Pfizer, American Cyanamid, Bristol Myers, and other drug manufacturers. The U.S. government charged Pfizer and American Cyanamid with price fixing in connection with tetracycline. Despite the case escalating to the Supreme Court and ending in a divided decision in 1972, other related litigation continued until 1982 and the series of cases is often referred to as the “Tetracycline Litigation.”

United States v. Charles Pfizer & Co., Inc.
- Supreme Court of the United States

Argued January 12, 1972 Decided January 24, 1972
- Full case name: United States v. Charles Pfizer & Company Inc.
- Docket no.: 70-72
- Citations: 404 U.S. 548 (more)

Case history
- Prior: United States v. Chas. Pfizer & Co., 205 F. Supp. 94 (S.D.N.Y. 1962); 217 F. Supp. 199 (S.D.N.Y. 1963); 281 F. Supp. 837 (S.D.N.Y. 1968); rev'd and remanded, 426 F.2d 32 (2d Cir. 1970); opinion modified and reh'g en banc denied, 437 F.2d 957 (2d Cir. 1970); cert. granted, 402 U.S. 942 (1971)

Holding
- Affirmation of the lower court's ruling by an equally divided Court (with no majority opinion or precedential holding established)

Court membership
- Chief Justice Warren E. Burger Associate Justices William O. Douglas · William J. Brennan Jr. Potter Stewart · Byron White; Thurgood Marshall · Harry Blackmun; Lewis F. Powell Jr. · William Rehnquist

Case opinions
- Majority: None, joined by None
- Concurrence: None
- Stewart, White, and Marshall took no part in the consideration or decision of the case.

Laws applied
- Section I and II of the Sherman Act

== Background ==
The focal point of the case was the two companies’ settlement of an interference proceeding before the United States Patent and Trademark Office over the priority of their respective applications for tetracycline. Under the settlement, American Cyanamid, which had acquired Heyden Chemicals‘s pending tetracycline application, conceded the priority of Pfizer’s application, withdrew its own application and exchanged cross licenses with Pfizer. According to the indictment of American Cyanamid, Bristol Myers, Pfizer, and Cyanamid knew that tetracycline represented a threat to the continuation of their dominant positions and unreasonably high profits. To keep that threat in check, the indictment alleged, Cyanamid bought out Heyden's rights to the development and agreed to help Pfizer acquire the tetracycline patent. In return, Pfizer licensed Cyanamid to produce the drug and later involved Bristol-Myers into the case to quell any remaining court fights. The Federal Trade Commission also found that the cross-license, combined with the fact that Pfizer had knowingly withheld information relevant to the patentability of tetracycline, constituted an attempt by Pfizer and American Cyanamid to share in an unlawful monopoly.

Following a criminal antitrust indictment in the Southern District of New York, a jury convicted all three defendants. This conviction, however, was overturned by the United States Court of Appeals for the Second Circuit, who ordered a retrial.

== Decision ==
On January 12, 1972, the case was brought upon the Supreme Court, which two weeks later affirmed by an equally divided Court (per curiam) the Second Circuit's decision for a new trial.

The case was ultimately sent back to the District Court for the Southern District of New York and was dismissed by District Judge John M. Cannella, who ruled that the Department of Justice had failed to prove beyond a reasonable doubt that the companies had conspired to fix prices or monopolize the tetracycline market. The federal government also sought to cancel the Pfizer patent on tetracycline, alleging fraud and the concealment of information that would have been relevant to the patent examiner. The government lost the final appeal of that case in 1982.

== See also ==
- Price fixing cases
- American Cyanamid
