= American Cyanamid =

American manufacturing conglomerate (1907–1994)

- Type: Public
- Traded as: NYSE: ACY
- Industry: Conglomerate originating with chemicals
- Founded: July 22, 1907
- Founder: Frank Washburn
- Defunct: 1994
- Fate: Merged with American Home Products in 1994
- Headquarters: One Cyanamid Plaza, Wayne, New Jersey, United States
- Divisions: 9
- Website: cyanamid.com (archived)

American Cyanamid was an American manufacturing conglomerate. Originally begun as a fertilizer manufacturer, the company added many additional lines of business before merging with American Home Products in 1994. The combined company sold off most of its divisions, adopted the name of its remaining Wyeth division, and was bought by Pfizer in 2009.

== History ==
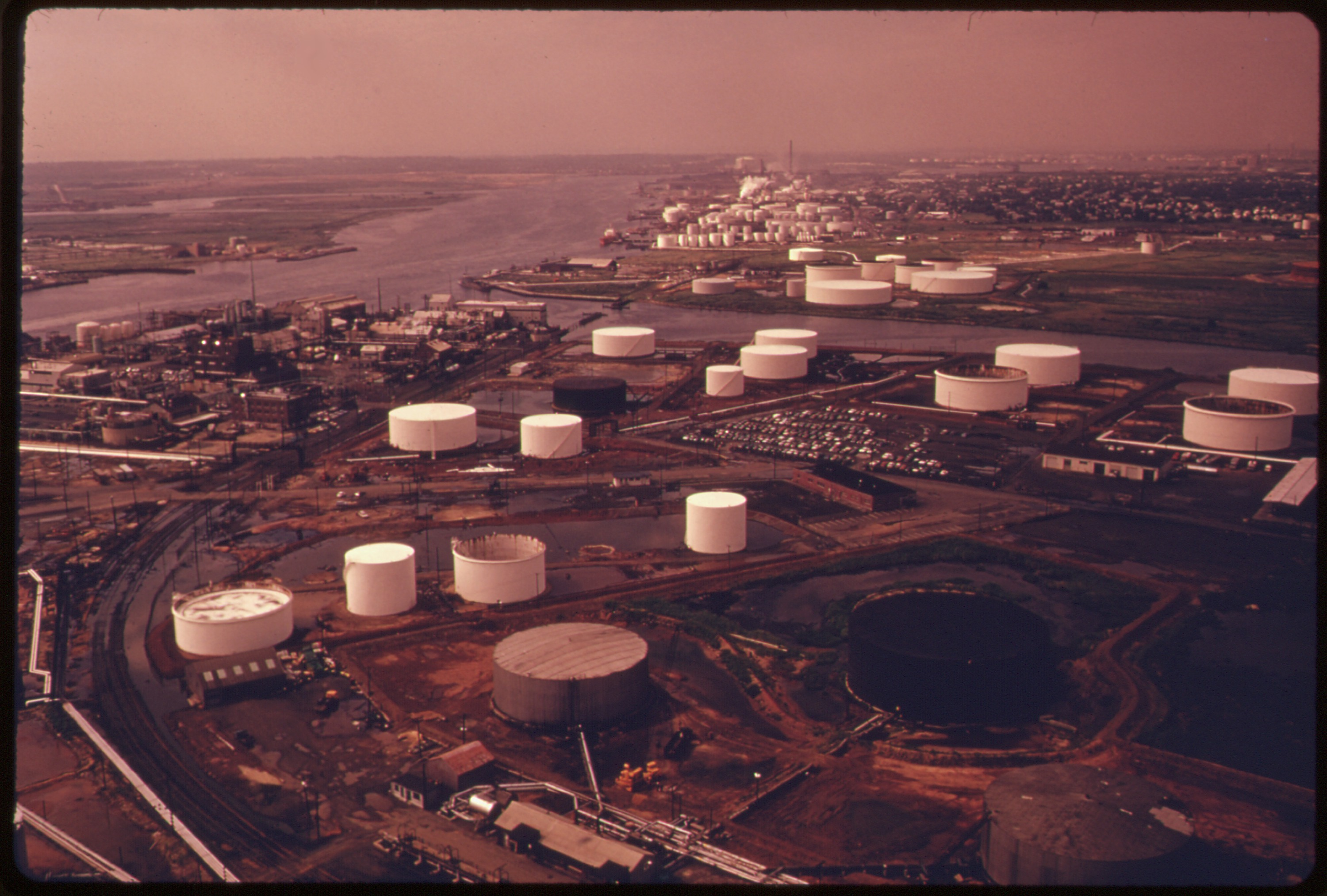
American Cyanamid Company facility in Linden, New Jersey

American Cyanamid was founded by engineers Frank S. Washburn and Charles H. Baker in New York City in 1907, to capitalize on a German patent that they had licensed for the manufacture of nitrogen products for fertilizer. The company's name is derived from the chemical calcium cyanamide, the fertilizer they would manufacture. They soon set up headquarters in Nashville, investing a million dollars in several corporations underpinning the manufacturing operation to be set up in nearby Muscle Shoals, Alabama. These planned operations included an electric power generating company, a utility company to distribute the electricity powering the chemical plant, and the Cyanamid manufacturing plant. Plants were also planned for Niagara Falls, Ontario and Georgia, and by 1908, the company had incorporated in Maine. The Canadian plant was the first in operation in 1910, followed by the Alabama plant. Washburn was President and located in Nashville, while Baker served as Vice President and remained in New York.

Despite these early establishments, manufacturing was suspended when the company was denied the construction of a dam for the hydroelectric generation station. Instead, United States offices of the company imported product from its Canadian plant to compensate for fewer resources. In 1915, the company abandoned its Nashville headquarters and relocated to New York City. At the same time, it was trying to raise political support, both through grass-roots and lobbying, to implement the Alabama power generation plan and compete in the growing market. During World War I, the company shifted its nitrogen production from fertilizer to explosives. With offers of free use of patents and processes, along with personnel and equipment, it enticed the federal government to approve and pay for its original plans for the Alabama plant, with some modifications, to contribute to the war effort. A separate company, the Air Nitrates Corporation, was set up for this contract to build and operate the plant for the duration of the war, with Cyanamid earning some fees and to later inherit the plant for its fertilizer business. This contract raised concerns of cronyism, but critics were quickly outnumbered by local supporters in Congress. However, by the end of the war, the first stage of the plant had only just begun limited production, and the Department of Justice soon opened an investigation into the contract for possible graft. After the dropping of the federal case due to insufficient evidence, Cyanamid then purchased the Ammo-Phosphate Corporation in 1917 and inherited their fertilizer plant in Linden, New Jersey.

Washburn died on October 9, 1922. At the time, the government still owned the Muscle Shoals plants. A year later, a number of interests were competing to buy or lease the site, including Air Nitrates/American Cyanamid, General Electric, and Henry Ford. However by 1926, the list of bidders was far different as the Senate debated the merits of Air Nitrates in a joint venture with Union Carbide, the local power companies, and a New York financial consortium. In the end, after much lobbying and debate, none of the bids were accepted and the government elected to run the plants itself.

American Cyanamid significantly ramped up its production after acquiring pharmaceutical company Lederle Labs in 1930, and manufactured critical pharmaceuticals such as the Typhus vaccine and Gangrene anti-toxins throughout the decade and during World War II. In the 1950s, American Cyanamid further experienced another significant rebound, largely driven by breakthroughs in its pharmaceutical division and constructed a chemical plant in Waggaman, Louisiana, called the Fortier Plant. The facility manufactured acrylonitrile, hydrogen cyanide, melamine, oleum and sulfuric acid. By the 1970s, the company, now headquartered in Wayne, New Jersey, had grown to over 100,000 employees worldwide, had over 200,000 shareholders, and its stock was traded on the New York Stock Exchange under the symbol ACY. However, by the early 1990s, the company began to experience decline and reported a significant drop in net earnings in 1991. The company was then repeatedly reorganized after the mid-1990s, merged with other firms, and saw brands and divisions sold or spun off to other companies. The bulk of the former company is now part of Pfizer, with smaller portions belonging to BASF, Procter & Gamble and other firms. In 1993, the Fortier Plant became part of American Cyanamid's spinoff, Cytec Industries and served as the Building Chemicals division before being purchased again by H.I.G. Capital in 2011 and renamed Cornerstone Chemical Company. The CEO and chairman of the board (1993-1994) was Albert Costello, who would go on to become president and CEO of W.R. Grace in 1995.

== Acquisition and breakup ==
In 1994, the company merged with American Home Products (AHP) in a $9.5 billion acquisition, at the time the second-largest industrial acquisition in U.S. history. After the AHP acquisition, the Cyanamid conglomerate was slowly disassembled over a period of years. The Pigments division was sold to National Lead Company, and the Old Spice product line and others were sold to Procter and Gamble. Formica Corporation was taken private in a management buyout, and later underwent a series of ownership changes, and is currently owned by Fletcher Building, headquartered in New Zealand. The $1.7 billion agricultural business was sold in 2000 to the German chemical giant BASF, raising BASF agricultural sales to $3.6 billion and making it one of the top three agricultural companies in the world. American Home Products eventually changed its name to Wyeth Corporation, and in 2009, Wyeth merged with Pfizer, becoming a subsidiary of the world's largest pharmaceutical company.

Most of the former chemical businesses of American Cyanamid are operated by a spun-off successor company known as Cytec. Cytec itself was acquired by Solvay Group in December 2015 to form the Cytec Solvay Group based in Brussels, Belgium. Despite being designated as a Superfund cleanup site by the Environmental Protection Agency (EPA) in 1983, the former American Cyanamid compound in Wayne, New Jersey later served as the corporate headquarters of Toys "R" Us before being vacated in 2018.

== Product lines ==
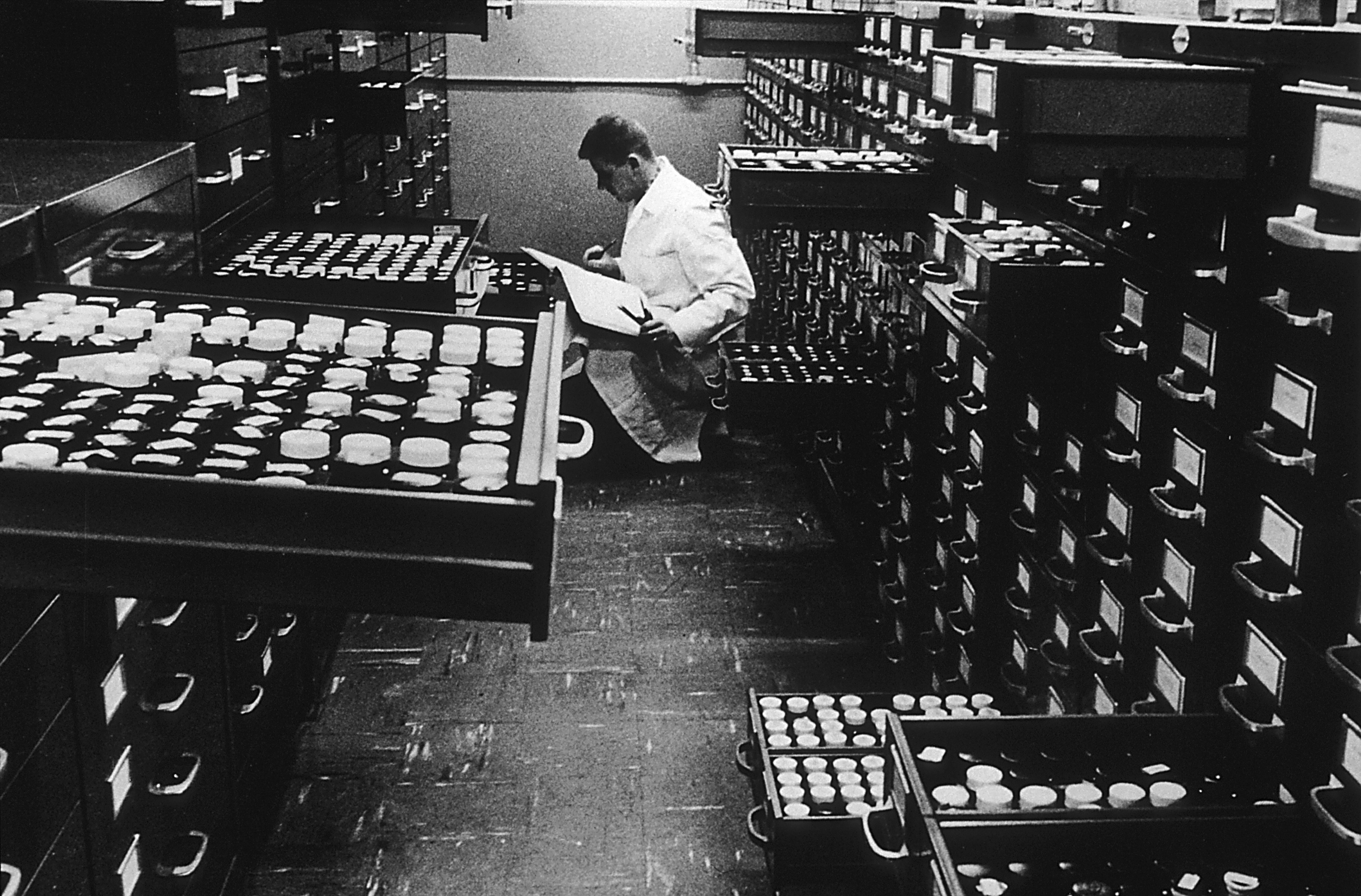
A scientist working in an anti-cancer chemical library at Lederle Laboratories, a division of American Cyanamid in 1961.

Although originally started as a manufacturer of agricultural chemicals, the company later broadened its product lines into producing many different types of industrial and specialty chemicals. The company then diversified into synthetic fibers, pharmaceuticals, surgical products, plastics, and inorganic pigments before World War II; and later added, by acquisitions, cosmetic and toiletry products, perfumes, building products, and several smaller product categories following the end of the war. From 1931 to 1943, American Cyanamid produced the pesticide Zyklon B under license.

Cyanamid's pharmaceutical division included Lederle Laboratories, the maker of Piperacillin, an antibiotic drug used as a penicillin substitute; Centrum, a multivitamin supplement; Stresstabs vitamins; and Orimune, an oral polio vaccine. Lederle also developed the antibiotic chlortetracycline and the chemotherapy agent methotrexate. Davis & Geck was the company's medical device operation, organized under Lederle. Its Consumer Products division included "Shulton" products, primarily Old Spice cologne and after-shave lotion, Breck shampoo, and Pine-Sol cleaner. A variety of fine fragrance products were also manufactured and sold by Shulton under license, including products under labels Nina Ricci, Pierre Cardin, Tabac, and others. "Melmac" was Cyanamid's trademark for plastic kitchenware, although it was produced and marketed by other firms under license.

== Legal issues ==
Throughout its history, the company faced legal challenges stemming from both environmental pollution incidents, including involvement in the tetracycline litigation, and safety incidents such as the 1964 American Cyanamid explosion. Throughout the 1970s, substantial funds were allocated for effluent treatment initiatives. For instance, a $15-million investment went into the construction of a tertiary water treatment facility in Bound Brook, New Jersey, and this plant not only cleaned water to a level surpassing that of the polluted Raritan River, but also addressed decades of pollution by American Cyanamid. Tens of millions more were spent in efforts to clean up large wastewater pools which had decades of toxic accumulation of carcinogenic, and teratogenic chemicals. These are considered by the U.S. Environmental Protection Agency (EPA) to be among the most toxic chemical waste sites in the country. Responsibility for the clean-up of these sites remained with the site owner during these corporate transitions. Remediation began at Bound Brook in 2007 before being taken over by Pfizer in 2009.

In addition to frequent chemical leaks, the 575-acre Superfund site at Bound Brook-Bridgewater also had a history of flooding. It was flooded in the 1930s and again in August 1971 during Tropical Storm Doria, at which time the plant sustained severe damage. In 2011, during Hurricane Irene, the site once again flooded but by this time all manufacturing had ended and all buildings had been torn down. However, impounds and waste sites remained with consequent leakage of benzene and other chemicals into the Raritan River and adjacent land, including residential areas. Despite subsequent testing showing no evident danger to humans, calamity intensified the cleanup work already underway, and the EPA announced another remediation plan for the site in September 2012. In 1973 the Georgia State Water Quality Control Board forced Cyanamid to stop dumping sulfuric acid in the Wilmington and Savannah Rivers, arguing that chemicals were causing mass fish kills.

On October 6, 1984, a cloud of toxic fumes leaking from the Linden Cyanamid Insecticide Plant spread over a 20-mile area of New Jersey and Staten Island, affecting thousands of residents living near the facility. More than 160 people were hospitalized, and the fumes prompted the evacuation of hundreds of workers from nearby industrial areas and an issuance of a temporary shelter-in-place. In early 1985, another insecticide leak from the same plant prompted more than 200 complaints to police and local hospitals of breathing problems and nausea in Brooklyn and Staten Island.

In addition to environmental concerns, American Cyanamid also faced numerous labor related challenges throughout its history, including lawsuits and violations charges from both federal and state agencies. In 1942, American Cyanamid was fined $453,461 for antitrust violations, and in 1975, the National Labor Relations Board (NLRB) found that American Cyanamid violated labor laws by permanently contracting out maintenance and service work at its Westwego, Louisiana plant while workers were on strike. The company was then ordered to reinstate the workers and bargain with the union. In 1978, more than 1,300 workers at the Linden, NJ plant decided to strike to protest against managers ignoring health hazards, including exposure to carcinogens and asbestos.

In the United Kingdom, the company was involved in a well-known legal case, American Cyanamid Co v Ethicon Ltd, which set the test for awarding an interim injunction in England and Wales and set down what became known to lawyers as the American Cyanamid principles. The American Cyanamid principles are also applied under public procurement law when the high court determines whether to lift the automatic suspension of the power to award a public contract when an application has been made to the court to challenge the lawfulness of a proposed contract award.

=== Willow Island Incident ===
In 1978, when the company decided that lead exposure at the Willow Island plant might cause birth defects, women of child-bearing age in the plant were ordered to quit, accept demotion, or be sterilized. In October 1979, the Department of Labor fined the company $10,000, maintaining that the policy was a major hazard that violated the Occupational Safety and Health Act. In 1984, the U.S. Court of Appeals for the Washington D.C. Circuit Court dismissed the charge, ruling that a company policy, as opposed to a physical workplace condition did not constitute a "hazard" within the meaning of OSHA. That same year, the ACLU filed a lawsuit alleging that the policy was a violation of the Civil Rights Act of 1964. The case was settled out of court, with American Cyanamid paying $200,000 and admitting no liability.

== See also ==
- Indiana Harbor Belt Railroad Co. v. American Cyanamid Co.
- United States v. Charles Pfizer & Co., Inc.
- List of Superfund sites in New Jersey

== General sources ==
- Ingham, John N (September 1983). Biographical dictionary of American business leaders. Greenwood Press. ISBN 978-0-313-23907-6.
- "American Chemical Industries". Industrial & Engineering Chemistry. 22 (3): 301–302. 1930. doi:10.1021/ie50243a025.
- Kepos, Paula, ed. (December 17, 1993). International directory of company histories. Vol. 8. St. James Press. pp. 23–26. ISBN 155862323X.
- Richards, Bill (January 1, 1979). "Women Say They Had to Be Sterilized to Hold Jobs".
