= Davis & Geck =

Medical equipment company

- Company type: Subsidiary
- Industry: Medical devices
- Founded: 1909
- Founders: Charles T. Davis, Fred A. Geck
- Defunct: Merged into Medtronic
- Fate: Acquired by American Cyanamid (1930); later part of Covidien, now Medtronic
- Headquarters: Brooklyn, New York (original); Danbury, Connecticut
- Products: Surgical sutures, wound closure devices, surgical technique products
- Parent: Medtronic

Davis & Geck was a surgical/medical device company founded in 1909 by Charles T. Davis and Fred A. Geck originally located in Brooklyn, NY.

It specialized in the development and manufacture of surgical sutures along with various other products in the wound closure, surgical technique, and aseptic technique categories. At one point, it manufactured over 2,000 different product codes.

In 1913, the Davis & Geck introduced the Calustro-thermal process for heat sterilization of suture tubes after the sutures were sealed inside. This innovation provided hospitals with a reliable product and saved time in the operating room.

In 1930, the company was acquired by American Cyanamid. The resulting Davis & Geck subsidiary moved its offices, laboratory and production facility to Danbury, CT in the 1950s and later opened a manufacturing plant in Manati, Puerto Rico.

Davis and Geck's most significant contribution to the surgical field was the invention of the synthetic absorbable suture. Its Dexon brand of sutures, patented in 1954 by Carl A. Powers and Gilbert B. Ayres and introduced in the 1970s, was made with a man made organic material called polyglycolic acid. This new category of suture product reduced a surgeon's reliance on animal derived "catgut" sutures, which have inconsistent strength properties and can often cause significant wound irritation to patients.

The company was also known for its contribution to the field of surgery due to its operation of the Davis & Geck Film library. The film library pioneered the filming of surgical procedures and provided films and videos to surgeons and nurses for educational purposes.

In 1994, the American Cyanamid Company announced that it had agreed to sell its Davis & Geck surgical products business to its European joint venture partner, B. Braun Melsungen A.G. of Germany, under undisclosed terms.

The Davis & Geck product line was sold to Sherwood and later to the Tyco Corporation where it was renamed Syneture. The company is currently part of Covidien, Ltd.

Medtronic plc has successfully completed the acquisition of Covidien plc. Under the terms of the acquisition agreement, Medtronic, Inc. and Covidien plc are now combined under Medtronic plc
