= Polymer-drug conjugates =

Polymer-drug conjugates are nano-medicine products under development for cancer diagnosis and treatment. There are more than 10 anticancer conjugates in clinical development. Polymer-drug conjugates are drug molecules held in polymer molecules, which act as the delivery system for the drug. Polymer drugs have passed multidrug resistance (MDR) testing and hence may become a viable treatment for endocrine-related cancers. A cocktail of pendant drugs could be delivered by water-soluble polymer platforms. The physical and chemical properties of the polymers used in polymer-drug conjugates are specially synthesized to flow through the kidneys and liver without being filtered out, allowing the drugs to be used more effectively. Traditional polymers used in polymer-drug conjugates can be degraded through enzymatic activity and acidity. Polymers are now being synthesized to be sensitive to specific enzymes that are apparent in diseased tissue. The drugs remain attached to the polymer and are not activated until the enzymes associated with the diseased tissue are present. This process significantly minimizes damage to healthy tissue.

== Method of delivery ==
Most typical deliver of drugs is through the mouth, skin, transmucosal and inhalation. Drug polymer conjugate follow these to some degree, but they are usually administered via injection. Many enzymes in the body decompose the drug if the drug is taken by other means.

== Currently Being Tested ==
The polymer-drug N-(2-Hydroxypropyl) methacrylamide (HPMA) copolymer-doxorubicin (PK1; FCE28068) shows up to a 5 times reduction in anthracycline type toxicity compared to current treatments. Doses up to 1680 mg/m2 observed no cardiotoxicity. Antitumor behavior was observed at 80–320 mg/m2 of doxorubicin.

Polymers are used for the delivery of drugs and proteins. Some types of polymers being tested now are poly(ethylene glycol) (PEG), N-(2-hydroxypropyl)methacrylamide (HPMA), and poly(lactide-co-glycolide) (PLGA) copolymers have been successful in medical research. Recently there has been a growing interest in polymer conjugation with biologically active components. Such conjugates usually accumulate in tumors and can reduce toxicity in the body. Depending on the desired location, polymer conjugates can be synthesized to either have degradable or non-degradable chemical bonds with their associated drug. To obtain many of many of these bonds the use of peptides or amino acids. There is a strong desire to synthesize polymeric conjugates with bioactive components and other drugs. The tendency of polymer drug conjugate to react with the proper type cell(s) needs to still be worked on, despite many current advances.

== Novel Polymer-Based Combinations ==
By now only traditional chemotherapeutic agents like doxorubicin, paclitaxel, camptothecins and platinates have been clinically tested in drug conjugates. Due to successful clinical proof-of-concept, second-generation conjugates are now being developed. Experimental chemotherapy and novel polymer-based combinations are currently under investigation. Instead of passive targeting developed so far, new approaches will provide receptor-mediated delivery. This will enable selective delivery of anticancer conjugates.

A natural polymer dextrin and pendant chain polyacetals, have shown ability of pH-dependent degradation after incorporation into cell compartments. Also diethylstilboestrol (DES) conjugates can undergo pH-dependent degradation. Polymer-Directed Enzyme Prodrug Therapy (PDEPT) is an example of two-step anticancer treatment.
