= Monocryl =

Synthetic surgical suture material

Monocryl is a synthetic, absorbable suture manufactured in Cornelia, Georgia, USA, and trademarked by Ethicon. It is composed of poliglecaprone 25, which is a copolymer of glycolide and ε-caprolactone. It comes both dyed (violet) and undyed (clear) and is an absorbable monofilament suture.

It is generally used for soft-tissue approximation and ligation. It is used frequently for subcuticular dermis closures of the face. It has less of a tendency to exit through the skin after it breaks down, in contrast to Vicryl. It is contraindicated for use in cardiovascular and neurologic tissues and for usage in ophthalmic and microsurgery. The use of poliglecaprone suture may be inappropriate in patients who are older, malnourished, or debilitated, as well as in patients with conditions that may delay wound healing.

Monocryl has a low tissue reactivity, maintains high tensile strength, and has a half-life of 7 to 14 days. At 1 week, its in vivo tensile strength is at 50–60% undyed (60–70% dyed), 20–30% undyed (30–40% dyed) at two weeks, and essentially completely hydrolyzed by 91–119 days. When removed from the package, it has a high degree of "memory", or coil. It is slippery, making it easier to pass than a braided suture. It has a consistency close to nylon suture material. It is rarely used for percutaneous skin closure and is not used in areas of high tension (e.g., fascia).
