= Polyhedral space =

Metric space

Polyhedral space is a certain metric space. A (Euclidean) polyhedral space is a (usually finite) simplicial complex in which every simplex has a flat metric. (Other spaces of interest are spherical and hyperbolic polyhedral spaces, where every simplex has a metric of constant positive or negative curvature). In the sequel all polyhedral spaces are taken to be Euclidean polyhedral spaces.

== Examples ==
All 1-dimensional polyhedral spaces are just metric graphs. A good source of 2-dimensional examples constitute triangulations of 2-dimensional surfaces. The surface of a convex polyhedron in $R^3$ is a 2-dimensional polyhedral space.

Any PL-manifold (which is essentially the same as a simplicial manifold, just with some technical assumptions for convenience) is an example of a polyhedral space. In fact, one can consider pseudomanifolds, although it makes more sense to restrict the attention to normal manifolds.

== Metric singularities ==
In the study of polyhedral spaces (particularly of those that are also topological manifolds) metric singularities play a central role. Let a polyhedral space be an n-dimensional manifold. If a point in a polyhedral space that is an n-dimensional topological manifold has no neighborhood isometric to a Euclidean neighborhood in R^n, this point is said to be a metric singularity. It is a singularity of codimension k, if it has a neighborhood isometric to R^{n-k} with a metric cone. Singularities of codimension 2 are of major importance; they are characterized by a single number, the conical angle.

The singularities can also studied topologically. Then, for example, there are no topological singularities of codimension 2. In a 3-dimensional polyhedral space without a boundary (faces not glued to other faces) any point has a neighborhood homeomorphic either to an open ball or to a cone over the projective plane. In the former case, the point is necessarily a codimension 3 metric singularity. The general problem of topologically classifying singularities in polyhedral spaces is largely unresolved (apart from simple statements that e.g. any singularity is locally a cone over a spherical polyhedral space one dimension less and we can study singularities there).

== Curvature ==
It is interesting to study the curvature of polyhedral spaces (the curvature in the sense of Alexandrov spaces), specifically polyhedral spaces of nonnegative and nonpositive curvature. Nonnegative curvature on singularities of codimension 2 implies nonnegative curvature overall. However, this is false for nonpositive curvature. For example, consider R^3 with one octant removed. Then on the edges of this octant (singularities of codimension 2) the curvature is nonpositive (because of branching geodesics), yet it is not the case at the origin (singularity of codimension 3), where a triangle such as (0,0,e), (0,e,0), (e,0,0) has a median longer than would be in the Euclidean plane, which is characteristic of nonnegative curvature.

== Additional structure ==
Many concepts of Riemannian geometry can be applied. There is only one obvious notion of parallel transport and only one natural connection. The concept of holonomy is strikingly simple in this case. The restricted holonomy group is trivial, and so there is a homomorphism from the fundamental group onto the holonomy group. It may be especially convenient to remove all singularities to obtain a space with a flat Riemannian metric and to study the holonomies there. One concepts thus arising are polyhedral Kähler manifolds, when the holonomies are contained in a group, conjugate to the unitary matrices. In this case, the holonomies also preserve a symplectic form, together with a complex structure on this polyhedral space (manifold) with the singularities removed. All the concepts such as differential form, L2 differential form, etc. are adjusted accordingly.

== Other topics ==
- Another direction of research are developments of dynamical billiards in polyhedral spaces, e.g. of nonpositive curvature (hyperbolic billiards).
- Positively curved polyhedral spaces arise also as links of points (typically metric singularities) in Euclidean polyhedral spaces.

== History ==
In full generality, polyhedral spaces were first defined by Milka
