= Guy Newey =

The Right Honourable Lord Justice Newey
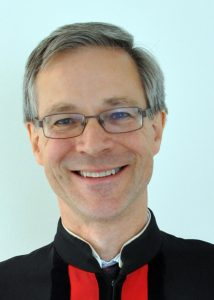
- Newey in 2017

Lord Justice of Appeal
- Incumbent
- Assumed office 2017

Justice of the High Court
- In office 2010–2017

Personal details
- Born: Guy Richard Newey
- Education: Queens' College, Cambridge

Sir Guy Richard Newey (born 1959), styled The Rt. Hon. Lord Justice Newey, is a Lord Justice of Appeal.

== Early life ==
The son of J. H. R. Newey and his wife Mollie Chalk, Newey was born in 1959 and educated at Tonbridge School and Queens' College, Cambridge.

== Career ==
He was called to the bar at Middle Temple in 1982 and made a bencher there in 2010. He was made a QC in 2001, a deputy judge of the High Court of Justice in 2006, and then a full judge in 2010 (in the Chancery Division) at which point he was awarded the customary knighthood, where he was assigned to the Chancery Division. In 2017 he was promoted to the Court of Appeal. On appointment to the Court of Appeal, he was appointed to the Privy Council of the United Kingdom.
