= Prodrug =

Compound that is metabolized into a pharmacologically active drug

A prodrug is a pharmacologically inactive medication or compound that, after intake, is metabolized (i.e., converted within the body) into a pharmacologically active drug. Instead of administering a drug directly, a corresponding prodrug can be used to improve how the drug is absorbed, distributed, metabolized, and excreted (ADME).

Prodrugs are often designed to improve bioavailability when a drug itself is poorly absorbed from the gastrointestinal tract. A prodrug may be used to improve how selectively the drug interacts with cells or processes that are not its intended target. This reduces adverse or unintended effects of a drug, especially important in treatments like chemotherapy, which can have severe unintended and undesirable side effects. Prodrugs can also be used to enable diffusion of medications across the blood brain barrier, as most small molecule drugs lack the necessary chemical attributes to pass to the brain independently.

IUPAC definition

Compound that undergoes biotransformation before exhibiting pharmacological effects.

Note 1: Modified from ref.

Note 2: Prodrugs can thus be viewed as drugs containing specialized nontoxic protective groups used in a transient manner to alter or to eliminate undesirable properties in the parent molecule.

== History ==
Many herbal extracts historically used in medicine contain glycosides (sugar derivatives) of the active agent, which are hydrolyzed in the intestines to release the active and more bioavailable aglycone. For example, salicin is a β-D-glucopyranoside that is cleaved by esterases to release salicylic acid. Aspirin (acetylsalicylic acid), first made by Felix Hoffmann at Bayer in 1897, is a synthetic prodrug of salicylic acid. However, in other cases, such as codeine and morphine, the administered drug is enzymatically activated to form sugar derivatives (morphine-glucuronides) that are more active than the parent compound.

The first synthetic antimicrobial drug, arsphenamine, discovered in 1909 by Sahachiro Hata in the laboratory of Paul Ehrlich, is not toxic to bacteria until it has been converted to an active form by the body. Likewise, prontosil, the first sulfa drug (discovered by Gerhard Domagk in 1932), must be cleaved in the body to release the active molecule, sulfanilamide. Since that time, many other examples have been identified.

Terfenadine, the first non-sedating antihistamine, had to be withdrawn from the market because of the small risk of a serious side effect. However, terfenadine was discovered to be the prodrug of the active molecule, fexofenadine, which does not carry the same risks as the parent compound. Therefore, fexofenadine could be placed on the market as a safe replacement for the original drug.

Loratadine, another non-sedating antihistamine, is the prodrug of desloratadine, which is largely responsible for the antihistaminergic effects of the parent compound. However, in this case the parent compound does not have the side effects associated with terfenadine, and so both loratadine and its active metabolite, desloratadine, are currently marketed.

== Approved prodrugs ==
Approximately 10% of all marketed drugs worldwide can be considered prodrugs. Since 2008, at least 30 prodrugs have been approved by the FDA. Seven prodrugs were approved in 2015 and six in 2017. Examples of later approved prodrugs are dabigatran etexilate (approved in 2010), gabapentin enacarbil (2011), sofosbuvir (2013), tedizolid phosphate (2014), isavuconazonium (2015), aripiprazole lauroxil (2015), selexipag (2015), latanoprostene bunod (2017), benzhydrocodone (2018), tozinameran (2020) serdexmethylphenidate (2021), and benzgalantamine (2024).

== Classification ==
Prodrugs can be classified into two major types, based on how the body converts the prodrug into the final active drug form:

- Type I prodrugs are bioactivated inside the cells (intracellularly). Examples of these are anti-viral nucleoside analogs that must be phosphorylated and the lipid-lowering statins.
- Type II prodrugs are bioactivated outside cells (extracellularly), especially in digestive fluids or in the body's circulatory system, particularly in the blood. Examples of Type II prodrugs are salicin (described above) and certain antibody-, gene- or virus-directed enzyme prodrugs used in chemotherapy or immunotherapy.

Both major types can be further categorized into subtypes, based on factors such as (Type I) whether the intracellular bioactivation location is also the site of therapeutic action, or (Type 2) whether or not bioactivation occurs in the gastrointestinal fluids or in the circulation system.

Classification of prodrugs
Type	Bioactivation site	Subtype	Tissue location of bioactivation	Examples
Type I	Intracellular	Type IA	Therapeutic target tissues/cells	Aciclovir, fluorouracil, cyclophosphamide, diethylstilbestrol diphosphate, L-DOPA, mercaptopurine, mitomycin, zidovudine, Hypoxia-activated prodrugs
Type I	Intracellular	Type IB	Metabolic tissues (liver, GI mucosal cell, lung etc.)	Carbamazepine, captopril, carisoprodol, heroin, molsidomine, leflunomide, paliperidone, phenacetin, primidone, psilocybin, sulindac, fursultiamine
Type II	Extracellular	Type IIA	GI fluids	Loperamide oxide, oxyphenisatin, sulfasalazine
Type II	Extracellular	Type IIB	Systemic circulation and other extracellular fluid compartments	Acetylsalicylate, bacampicillin, bambuterol, chloramphenicol succinate, dipivefrin, fosphenytoin, lisdexamfetamine, pralidoxime
Type II	Extracellular	Type IIC	Therapeutic target tissues/cells	ADEPTs, GDEPTs, VDEPTs

== Subtypes ==
Type IA prodrugs include many antimicrobial and chemotherapy agents (e.g., 5-flurouracil). Type IB agents rely on metabolic enzymes, especially in hepatic cells, to bioactivate the prodrugs intracellularly to active drugs. Type II prodrugs are bioactivated extracellularly, either in the milieu of GI fluids (Type IIA), within the systemic circulation and/or other extracellular fluid compartments (Type IIB), or near therapeutic target tissues/cells (Type IIC), relying on common enzymes such as esterases and phosphatases or target directed enzymes.

Importantly, prodrugs can belong to multiple subtypes (i.e., Mixed-Type). A Mixed-Type prodrug is one that is bioactivated at multiple sites, either in parallel or sequential steps. For example, a prodrug, which is bioactivated concurrently in both target cells and metabolic tissues, could be designated as a "Type IA/IB" prodrug (e.g., HMG Co-A reductase inhibitors and some chemotherapy agents; note the symbol " / " applied here). When a prodrug is bioactivated sequentially, for example initially in GI fluids then systemically within the target cells, it is designated as a "Type IIA-IA" prodrug (e.g., tenofovir disoproxil; note the symbol " - " applied here). Many antibody- virus- and gene-directed enzyme prodrug therapies (ADEPTs, VDEPTs, GDEPTs) and proposed nanoparticle- or nanocarrier-linked drugs can understandably be Sequential Mixed-Type prodrugs. To differentiate these two Subtypes, the symbol dash " - " is used to designate and to indicate sequential steps of bioactivation, and is meant to distinguish from the symbol slash " / " used for the Parallel Mixed-Type prodrugs.

== See also ==
- Hypoxia-activated prodrugs
- Neurotransmitter prodrug
- Precursor (chemistry)
- Toxication
