= Caprolactone =

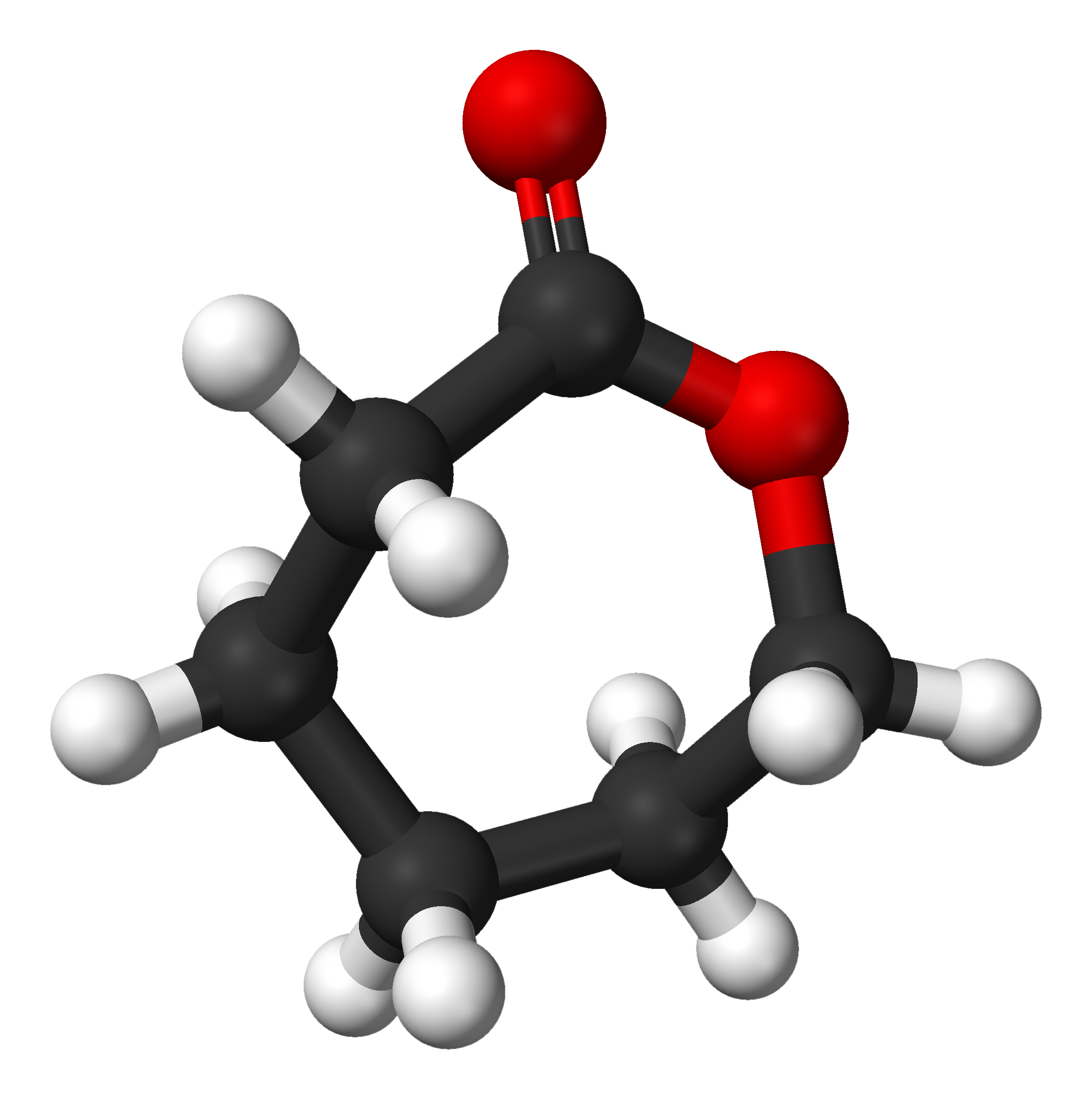

Names
- Preferred IUPAC name Oxepan-2-one
- Other names Caprolactone ε-Caprolactone; Hexano-6-lactone; 6-Hexanolactone; Hexan-6-olide; 1-Oxa-2-oxocycloheptane

Identifiers
CAS Number	502-44-3
3D model (JSmol)	Interactive image
ChEBI	CHEBI:17915
ChEMBL	ChEMBL373123
ChemSpider	9972
ECHA InfoCard	100.007.217
KEGG	C01880
PubChem CID	10401
UNII	56RE988L1R
CompTox Dashboard (EPA)	DTXSID4027159
- InChI: InChI=1S/C6H10O2/c7-6-4-2-1-3-5-8-6/h1-5H2 Key: PAPBSGBWRJIAAV-UHFFFAOYSA-N; InChI=1/C6H10O2/c7-6-4-2-1-3-5-8-6/h1-5H2 Key: PAPBSGBWRJIAAV-UHFFFAOYAG
- SMILES: C1CCC(=O)OCC1

Properties
Chemical formula	C_{6}H_{10}O_{2}
Molar mass	114.14 g/mol
Density	1.030 g/cm^{3}
Melting point	−1 °C (30 °F; 272 K)
Boiling point	241 °C (466 °F; 514 K)
Solubility in water	Miscible
- Except where otherwise noted, data are given for materials in their standard state (at 25 °C [77 °F], 100 kPa). verify (what is ?) Infobox references

ε-Caprolactone or simply caprolactone is a lactone (a cyclic ester) possessing a seven-membered ring. Its name is derived from caproic acid. This colorless liquid is miscible with most organic solvents and water. It was once produced on a large scale as a precursor to caprolactam.

== Production and uses ==
Caprolactone is prepared industrially by Baeyer-Villiger oxidation of cyclohexanone with peracetic acid.

Caprolactone is a monomer used in the production of highly specialised polymers. Ring-opening polymerization, for example, gives polycaprolactone. Another polymer is polyglecaprone, used as suture material in surgery.

Berryflor™ [104986-28-9] is a known use of caprolactone.

== Reactions ==
Although no longer economical, caprolactone was once produced as a precursor to caprolactam. Caprolactone is treated with ammonia at elevated temperatures to give the lactam:

(CH_{2})_{5}CO_{2} + NH_{3} → (CH_{2})_{5}C(O)NH + H_{2}O

Carbonylation of caprolactone gives, after hydrolysis, pimelic acid. The lactone ring is easily opened with nucleophiles including alcohols and water to give polylactones and eventually the 6-hydroxyadipic acid.

== Related compounds ==
Several other caprolactones are known, including α-, β-, γ-, and δ-caprolactones. All are chiral. (R)-γ-caprolactone is a component of floral scents and of the aromas of some fruits and vegetables, and is also produced by the Khapra beetle as a pheromone. δ-caprolactone is found in heated milk fat.

An ether of caprolactone is used as a binder for AP/AN/Al rocket propellant HTCE: Hydroxy-Terminated Caprolactone Ether

== Safety ==
Caprolactone hydrolyses rapidly and the resulting hydroxycarboxylic acid displays unexceptional toxicity, as is common for the other hydroxycarboxylic acids. It is known to cause severe eye irritation. Exposure may result in corneal injury.
