= N-(2-Hydroxypropyl) methacrylamide =

Names
- Preferred IUPAC name N-(2-Hydroxypropyl)-2-methylprop-2-enamide
- Other names N-(2-Hydroxypropyl)methacrylamide

Identifiers
CAS Number	21442-01-3
3D model (JSmol)	Interactive image
ChemSpider	35398
PubChem CID	38622
UNII	R3F262Z4E0
CompTox Dashboard (EPA)	DTXSID30944024
- InChI: InChI=1S/C7H13NO2/c1-5(2)7(10)8-4-6(3)9/h6,9H,1,4H2,2-3H3,(H,8,10) Key: OKPYIWASQZGASP-UHFFFAOYSA-N
- SMILES: CC(CNC(=O)C(=C)C)O

Properties
Chemical formula	C_{7}H_{13}NO_{2}
Molar mass	143.186 g·mol^{−1}
Appearance	White odorless crystals
- Except where otherwise noted, data are given for materials in their standard state (at 25 °C [77 °F], 100 kPa). Infobox references

N-(2-Hydroxypropyl)methacrylamide or N-HPMA is the monomer used to make the polymer poly(N-(2-hydroxypropyl)methacrylamide).

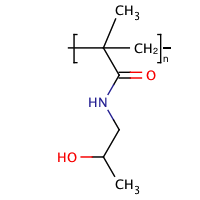
Poly(N-(2-hydroxypropyl) methacrylamide); poly(HPMA); pHPMA; PHPMA

The polymer is water-soluble (highly hydrophilic), non-immunogenic and non-toxic, and resides in the blood circulation well. Thus, it is frequently used as macromolecular carrier for low molecular weight drugs (especially anti-cancer chemotherapeutic agents) to enhance therapeutic efficacy and limit side effects. Poly(HPMA)-drug conjugate preferably accumulates in tumor tissues via the passive-targeting process (or so-called EPR effect). Due to its favorable characteristics, HPMA polymers and copolymers are also commonly used to produce synthetic biocompatible medical materials such as hydrogels.

The development of pHPMA as anti-cancer drug delivery vehicles is initiated by Dr. Jindřich Kopeček and colleagues at the Czech (-oslovak) Academy of Sciences in Prague in the mid-1970s. Prior to this, it was used as a plasma expander. The Kopeček Laboratory designed and developed HPMA copolymer-drug conjugates as a lysosomal delivery vehicle to cancer cells. The concept of using pHPMA as polymeric drug carriers has opened a new perspective in modern pharmaceutical science, and developed into the first polymer-drug conjugate entering clinical trials (i.e. PK1; HPMA copolymer-doxorubicin conjugate).

The HPMA copolymers are also used as a scaffold for iBodies, polymer-based antibody mimetics.

== See also ==
- Polymer-drug conjugates
