= Jindřich Kopeček =

Czech-American chemist (born 1940)

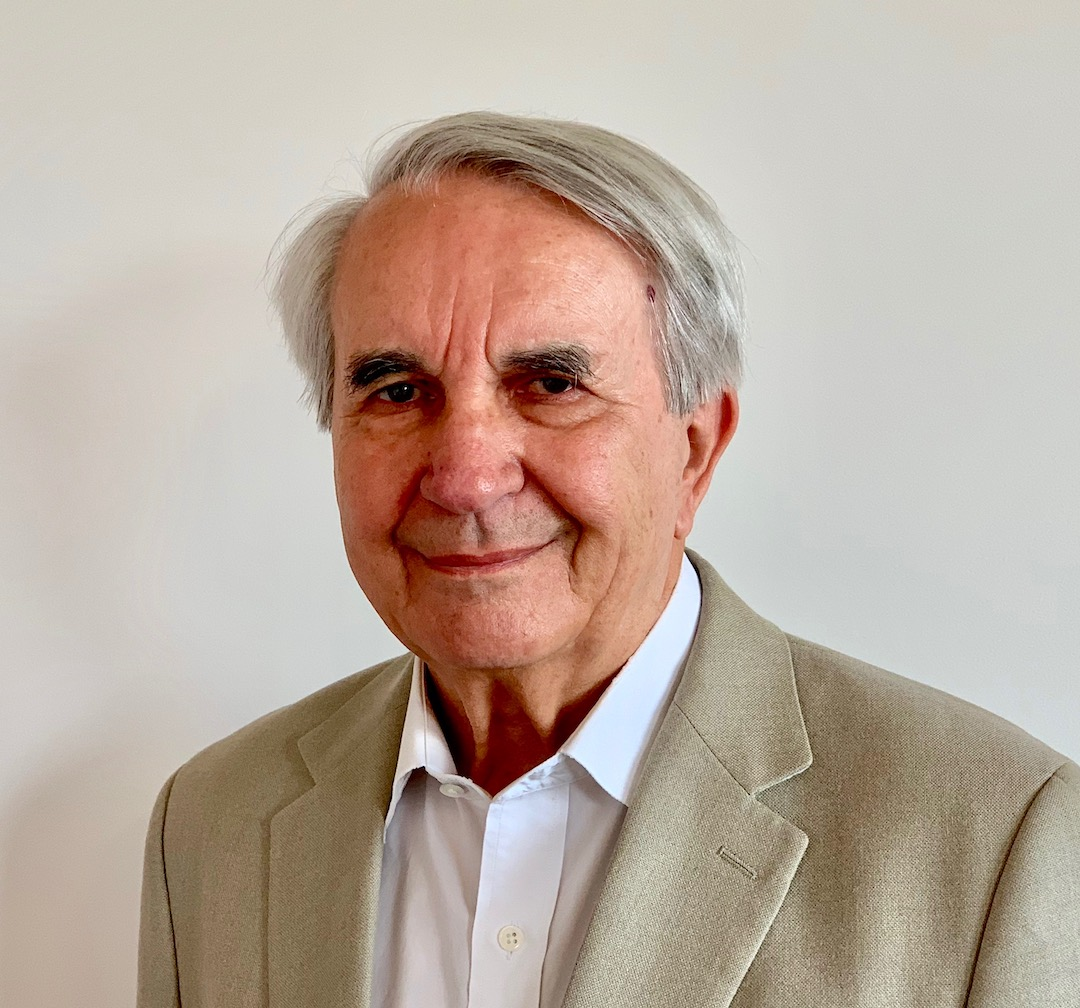
- Kopeček in 2020
- Born: January 27, 1940 (age 86); Strakonice, Protectorate of Bohemia and Moravia
- Education: Czechoslovak Academy of Sciences (Ph.D., D.Sc.); Institute of Chemical Technology, Prague (M.S.)
- Occupations: Chemist, pharmaceutical scientist, professor
- Known for: Polymer-based drug delivery
- Website: kopeceklab.com

Jindřich "Henry" Kopeček (born January 27, 1940) is a Czech-American chemist. He is a professor of pharmaceutical chemistry and a professor of biomedical engineering at the University of Utah in Salt Lake City, Utah. Kopeček is also an honorary professor at Sichuan University in Chengdu, China. His research focuses on biorecognition of macromolecules, bioconjugate chemistry, drug delivery systems, self-assembled biomaterials, and drug-free macromolecular therapeutics.

Kopeček is regarded as one of the pioneers in development of biomedicinal polymers such as hydrogel implants and design of new polymer-drug conjugates. He was a key figure in a group which created the first clinically tested polymeric cancerostatics (PK1 and PK2). Hydrogels from his laboratory have been in clinical use.

He was elected a member of the U.S. National Academy of Engineering in 2011 for contributions to the design of hydrogel biomaterials and polymeric drug delivery systems. In 2018, he was elected Fellow of the National Academy of Inventors.

As of July 15, 2021, Kopeček has been cited over 35,000 times, with an h-index of 100, and I-10 index of 408.

== Biography ==
Kopeček was born in Strakonice (today the Czech Republic).

=== Education ===
Kopeček graduated with his M.S. in macromolecular chemistry from the Institute of Chemical Technology in Prague, Czechoslovakia, in 1961. He then received his Ph.D. in macromolecular chemistry from the Institute of Macromolecular Chemistry at the Czechoslovak Academy of Sciences in Prague in 1965. In 1967, Kopeček pursued postdoctoral studies at the National Research Council of Canada in the Division of Applied Chemistry in Ottawa. In 1990 Kopeček received his D.Sc. in chemistry from the Czechoslovak Academy of Sciences. During his time in graduate school, he was mentored by professors Drahoslav Lim and Otto Wichterle, who invented hydrogels and created soft contact lenses. Kopeček received an honorary Ph.D. from the University of Helsinki in Finland in 2014.

=== Academia ===
Prior to his postdoctoral fellowship, Kopeček served as the research scientific officer for the Institute of Macromolecular Chemistry at the Czechoslovak Academy of Sciences from 1965 to 1967. He then served in the same capacity after his postdoctoral fellowship at the National Research Council of Canada until 1972, when he became the head of the Laboratory of Medical Polymers at the Institute of Macromolecular Chemistry from 1972 to 1980. Kopeček then became head of the Laboratory of Biodegradable Polymers until 1988. In 1986, Kopeček became co-director for the Center of Controlled Chemical Delivery of Utah and was a visiting professor. From 1989, he was professor of bioengineering and professor of pharmaceutics and pharmaceutical chemistry. As of 2002, Kopeček has been a distinguished professor in both pharmaceutical chemistry and biomedical engineering. In 2017, he became the director for the Center of Controlled Chemical Delivery at the University of Utah.

== Career and research ==
=== Early studies in Prague laboratory ===
Kopeček's graduate research focused on the kinetics of crosslinking polymerization of hydrophilic esters of methacrylic acid and structural characterization of ensuing hydrogels. This was followed by the investigation of the relationship between the chemical and physical structure of hydrogels and their biocompatibility. This formed the basis for the translation of hydrogels based on crosslinked poly(ethyleneglycol monomethacrylate) into the clinics.

The next focus was the design of water-soluble polymer-drug conjugates based on the copolymers of N-(2-hydroxypropyl)methacrylamide (HPMA). Kopeček and coworkers formulated and implemented a comprehensive approach to the problems designing macromolecular conjugates to modulate the pharmacokinetics and tissue localization of therapeutic agents. The most important contribution to the science of controlled release include: (1) the development of polymers and copolymers of N-(2-hydroxypropyl)methacrylamide (HPMA) as drug carriers; (2) the introduction of enzymatically degradable derivatives of these polymers; (3) fundamental studies of the rates of enzymatic degradation of oligopeptide side-chains in polymers; (4) determination of the relationship between polymer structure and rates of pinocytic uptake of those polymers into cells; (5) design and preparation of polymers capable of specific intralysosomal release of chemically bound therapeutic agents; (6) fundamental studies of tissue localization of polymeric carriers bearing ligands for receptors expressed on the surfaces of specific target cells. Three HPMA copolymer - anticancer drug conjugates were in Phase I/II clinical trials.

=== Research in Utah ===
Research in the Kopeček Biomedical Polymers Laboratory focuses on: a) Macromolecular therapeutics with emphasis on combination chemotherapy and immunotherapy; b) Macromolecular therapeutics for brain delivery; c) Drug-free macromolecular therapeutics – a new paradigm in nanomedicine where apoptosis is initiated by biorecognition of nanoconjugates at the cell surface and receptor crosslinking; no low molecular weight drug is needed.

=== Combination chemotherapy and immunotherapy ===
To develop methods for the treatment of immunosuppressive cancers we combine polymer-drug conjugates with polymer – checkpoint inhibitor conjugates. Newly designed backbone degradable HPMA copolymer – anticancer drug conjugates possess long-circulating pharmacokinetics and enhanced antitumor activities, while keeping excellent biocompatibility. The conjugates induce immunogenic cell death in murine cancer models and convert “cold” tumors to “hot” ones that are susceptible to PD-L1 degradation immunotherapy. Original design of a new multivalent PD-L1 antagonist not only acts as a traditional checkpoint inhibitor, but mediates the surface crosslinking of PD-L1, biases its subcellular fate to lysosomes for degradation, and exhibits persistent suppression. Pre-clinical evaluation of the leading HPMA copolymer-epirubicin conjugate (KT-1) is being executed at the Nanotechnology Characterization Laboratory at NCI.

=== Macromolecular therapeutics for brain delivery ===
Nanomedicines designed for brain delivery/action have a difficult hurdle to overcome; they need to cross the blood brain barrier. We focus on receptor binding peptides that transcytose bound cargo into the brain. In particular, angiopep-2 (TFFYGGSRGKRNNFKTEEY) binds to LDLR (low-density lipoprotein receptor)-related protein (LRP)-1 followed by transcytosis. In collaboration with the University of Utah Department of Radiology we are developing conjugates suitable for the treatment of traumatic brain injury and Alzheimer disease.

=== Drug-free macromolecular therapeutics (DFMT) ===
Our present studies evaluate the 2nd generation of DMFT. Anti-CD20 antibodies are divided into Type I such as rituximab (RTX) and Type II such as obinutuzumab (OBN); they have different patterns of binding to CD20 receptor. RTX binds between CD20 tetramers resulting in accumulation in lipid rafts, calcium influx and caspase activation. OBN binds within one tetramer with the conformation compatible with homotypic adhesion regions, leading to actin cytoskeleton remodeling and lysosome disruption. Our design enhances the activity of Type II OBN by triggering the apoptosis activation pathways of both types of antibodies. This new system is composed of two nanoconjugates: a) bispecific engager, OBN-MORF1 (OBN conjugated to one morpholino oligonucleotide MORF1); and b) a crosslinking (effector) component HSA-(MORF2)_{X} (human serum albumin (HSA) grafted with multiple copies of complementary morpholino oligonucleotide 2). Modification of OBN with one MORF1 does not impact the binding of OBN-MORF1 to CD20 and following binding to CD20 Type II effects occur. Further exposure to multivalent effector HSA-(MORF2)_{X} results in clustering the OBN-MORF1-CD20 complexes into lipid rafts and Type I effects occur. This new approach, called “clustered OBN (cOBN)” combines effects of both antibody types resulting in very high apoptotic levels.

== Selected awards ==
- US National Academy of Inventors, Elected Fellow, 2018
- T. & A. Higuchi Memorial Lectureship Award, Academy of Pharmaceutical Science and Technology,
- Japan, 2018
- Distinguished Mentor Award, University of Utah, 2017
- Doctor of Philosophy honoris causa, University of Helsinki, Finland, 2014
- US National Academy of Engineering, Member, 2011
- Honorary professorship, Sichuan University, China, 2007
- Distinguished International Scientist Award, Japanese Biomaterials Society, 2006
- Chair, Gordon Research Conference on Drug Carriers in Medicine and Biology, 2004
- J. Heyrovský Honorary Medal for Merit in the Chemical Sciences, Academy of Sciences of the Czech Republic, 2003
- Paul Dawson Biotechnology Award, American Association of Colleges of Pharmacy, 2001
- Millennial Pharmaceutical Scientist Award, Millennial World Congress of Pharm. Sciences, 2000
- Fellow of Biomaterials Science and Engineering, International Union of Societies of Biomaterials Science and Engineering, 1999
- Founders Award, Controlled Release Society, 1999
- Czech Learned Society, Honorary Member, 1998
- Award of the Presidia of the Czechoslovak and USSR Academies of Sciences 1977
- Selected publications and patents

== Publications ==
- J. Kopeček, J. Yang, "Polymer Nanomedicines". Advanced Drug Delivery Reviews 156, 40–66 (2020)
- L. Li, Y. Li, C.-H. Yang, D.C. Radford, J. Wang, M. Janát-Amsbury, J. Kopeček, J. Yang, "Inhibition of Immunosuppresive Tumors by Polymer-Assisted Inductions of Immunogenic Cell Death and Multivalent PD-L1 Crosslinking". Advanced Functional Materials 30:1908961 (2020)
- L. Li, J. Wang, Y. Li, D.C. Radford, J. Yang, J. Kopeček, "Broadening and Enhancing Functions of Antibodies by Self-Assembling Multimerization at Cell Surface". ACS Nano 13, 11422–11432 (2019)
- J. Yang, L. Li, J. Kopeček, "Biorecognition: A Key to Drug-free Macromolecular Therapeutics". Biomaterials 190–191, 11–23 (2019)
- J. Wang, L. Li, J. Yang, P.M. Clair, M. Glenn, D.M. Stephens, D.C. Radford, K.M. Kosak, M.W. Deininger, P.J. Shami, J. Kopeček, "Drug-free Macromolecular Therapeutics Induce Apoptosis in Cells Isolated from Patients with B Cell Malignancies with Enhanced Apoptosis Induction by Pretreatment with Gemcitabine". Nanomedicine: Nanotechnology, Biology and Medicine 16, 217–225 (2019).
- J. Yang, R. Zhang, H. Pan, Y. Li, Y. Fang, L. Zhang, J. Kopeček, "Backbone Degradable HPMA Copolymer Conjugates with Gemcitabine and Paclitaxel: Impact of Molecular Weight on Activity toward Human Ovarian Carcinoma Xenografts". Molecular Pharmaceutics 14, 1384–1394 (2017)
- J.M. Hartley, T.-W. Chu, E.M. Peterson, R. Zhang, J. Yang, J. Harris, J. Kopeček, "Super-Resolution Imaging and Quantitative Analysis of Membrane Protein/Lipid Raft Clustering Mediated by Cell Surface Self-Assembly of Hybrid Nanoconjugates". ChemBioChem 16, 1725–1729 (2015)
- R. Zhang, J. Yang, M. Sima, Y. Zhou, J. Kopeček, "Sequential Combination Therapy of Ovarian Cancer with Degradable N-(2-Hydroxypropyl)methacrylamide Copolymer Paclitaxel and Gemcitabine Conjugates". Proceedings of the National Academy of Sciences of the United States of America 111(33), 12181–12186 (2014)
- T.-W. Chu, J. Yang, J. Kopeček, "Anti-CD20 Multivalent HPMA Copolymer-Fab’ Conjugates for the Direct Induction of Apoptosis". Biomaterials 33, 7174–7181 (2012)
- H. Pan, J. Yang, P. Kopečková, J. Kopeček. :Backbone Degradable Multiblock N-(2-Hydroxypropyl)methacrylamide Copolymer Conjugates via Reversible Addition-Fragmentation Chain Transfer Polymerization and Thiol-ene Coupling Reaction". Biomacromolecules 12, 247–252 (2011)
- K. Wu, J. Liu, R.N. Johnson, J. Yang, J. Kopeček, "Drug-Free Macromolecular Therapeutics: Induction of Apoptosis by Coiled-Coil Mediated Crosslinking of Antigens on Cell Surface". Angewandte Chemie International Edition 49, 1451–1455 (2010)
- J. Kopeček, P. Kopečková, "HPMA Copolymers: Origins, Early Developments, Present, and Future". Advanced Drug Delivery Reviews 62, 122–149 (2010)
- J. Kopeček, "Hydrogels. From Soft Contact Lenses and Implants to Self-Assembled Nanomaterials". Journal of Polymer Science Part A: Polymer Chemistry 47, 5929–5946 (2009)
- J. Yang, C. Xu, C. Wang, J. Kopeček, "Refolding Hydrogels Self-Assembled from N-(2-Hydroxypropyl)methacrylamide Graft Copolymers by Antiparallel Coiled-Coil Formation". Biomacromolecules 7, 1187–1195 (2006)
- J.-G. Shiah, Y. Sun, C.M. Peterson, R.C. Straight, J. Kopeček, "Antitumor Activity of N-(2-Hydroxypropyl)methacrylamide Copolymer-Meso Chlorin e_{6} and Adriamycin Conjugates in Combination Treatments". Clinical Cancer Research 6, 1008–1015 (2000)
- T. Minko, P. Kopečková, J. Kopeček, "Efficacy of Chemotherapeutic Action of HPMA Copolymer-Bound Doxorubicin in a Solid Tumor Model of Ovarian Carcinoma". International Journal of Cancer 86, 108–117 (2000)
- Z.-R. Lu, P. Kopečková, J. Kopeček, "Polymerizable Fab’ Antibody Fragments for Targeting of Anticancer Drugs". Nature Biotechnology 17, 1101–1104 (1999)
- C. Wang, R.J. Stewart, J. Kopeček, "Hybrid Hydrogels Assembled from Synthetic Polymers and Coiled-Coil Protein Domains". Nature 397, 417–420 (1999)
- N.L. Krinick, Y. Sun, D. Joyner, J.D. Spikes, R.C. Straight, J. Kopeček, "A Polymeric Drug Delivery System for the Simultaneous Delivery of Drugs Activatable by Enzymes and/or Light". Journal of Biomaterials Science, Polymer Edition 5, 303–324 (1994)
- R. Duncan, P. Kopečková, J. Strohalm, I.C. Hume, J.B. Lloyd, J. Kopeček, "Anticancer Agents Coupled to N-(2-Hydroxypropyl)methacrylamide Copolymers. 2. Evaluation of Daunomycin Conjugates In Vivo against L1210 Leukaemia". British Journal of Cancer 57, 147–156 (1988)
- P. Rejmanová, J. Pohl, M. Baudyš, V. Kostka, J. Kopeček, "Polymers Containing Enzymatically Degradable Bonds. 8. Degradation of Oligopeptide Sequences in N-(2-Hydroxypropyl)methacrylamide Copolymers by Bovine Spleen Cathepsin B". Die Makromolekulare Chemie 184, 2009–2020 (1983)
- K. Ulbrich, J. Strohalm, J. Kopeček, "Polymers Containing Enzymatically Degradable Bonds. 6. Hydrophilic Gels Cleavable by Chymotrypsin". Biomaterials 3, 150–154 (1982)
- J. Kopeček, P. Rejmanová, V. Chytrý, "Polymers Containing Enzymatically Degradable Bonds. 1. Chymotrypsin Catalyzed Hydrolysis of p-Nitroanilides of Phenylalanine and Tyrosine Attached to Side-Chains of Copolymers of N-(2-Hydroxypropyl)methacrylamide". Die Makromolekulare Chemie 182, 799–809 (1981)
- J. Kopeček, "Soluble Biomedical Polymers". Polymers in Medicine (Wroclaw) 7, 191–221 (1977)
- Z. Voldřich, Z. Tománek, J. Vacík, J. Kopeček, "Long-Term Experience with the Poly(Glycol Monomethacrylate) Gel in Plastic Operations of the Nose". Journal of Biomedical Materials Research 9, 675–685 (1975)
- J. Kopeček, H. Bažilová, Poly[N-(2-Hydroxypropyl)methacrylamide]. 1. "Radical Polymerization and Copolymerization". European Polymer Journal J. 9, 7–14 (1973)
- J. Kopeček, J. Vacík, D. Lím, "Permeability of Membranes Containing Ionogenic Groups". Journal of Polymer Science A-1, 9, 2801–2815 (1971)
- L. Šprincl, J. Kopeček, D. Lím, "Effect of Porosity of Heterogeneous Poly(Glycol Monomethacrylate) Gels on the Healing-in of Test Implants". Journal of Biomedical Materials Research 5, 447–458 (1971)
- J. Kopeček, J. Jokl, D. Lím, "Mechanism of Three-Dimensional Polymerization of Glycol Methacrylates" (in German). Journal of Polymer Science C 16, 3877–3889 (1968)

== Patents ==
- Compositions and methods for inducing apoptosis. J. Kopeček, J. Yang, T.-W. Chu. (2019) US 10,251,906 B2.
- Compositions and methods for using albumin-based nanomedicines. J. Kopeček, J. Yang. US 10,925,973 (Feb. 23, 2021)
- Polymeric drug delivery conjugates and methods of making and using thereof. H. Pan, J. Yang, P. Kopečková, K. Luo, J. Kopeček (2016) US 9,289,510 B2
- Hydrogels of water-soluble polymers crosslinked by protein domains. J. Kopeček, R. Stewart, K. Caldwell, C. Wang, C-H. Ho (2007) US 7,179,487
- Synthetic polymeric drugs. J. Kopeček, P. Rejmanová, J. Strohalm, K. Ulbrich, B. Říhová, V. Chytrý, J.B. Lloyd, R. Duncan (1991) US 5,037,883
- Copolymers based on N-substituted acrylamides, N-substituted methacrylamides and N,N-disubstituted acrylamides and the method of their manufacturing. J. Kopeček, K. Ulbrich, J. Vacík, J. Strohalm, V. Chytrý, J. Drobník, J. Kálal (1977) US 4,062,831
- Device for connecting or joining the ends of interrupted tubular organs in surgical operations without stitching. D. Lím, L. Šprincl, J. Kopeček (1973) US 3,774,615
- Increasing permeability of reverse osmosis membranes. J. Kopeček, S. Sourirajan (1970) US 3,536,612
