= Glycolide =

Names
- IUPAC name 1,4-Dioxane-2,5-dione

Identifiers
CAS Number	502-97-6
3D model (JSmol)	Interactive image
ChemSpider	58895
DrugBank	DB16177
ECHA InfoCard	100.007.232
EC Number	207-954-9
PubChem CID	65432
UNII	YRZ676PGU6
CompTox Dashboard (EPA)	DTXSID8060115
- InChI: InChI=1S/C4H4O4/c5-3-1-7-4(6)2-8-3/h1-2H2 Key: RKDVKSZUMVYZHH-UHFFFAOYSA-N
- SMILES: O=C1COC(=O)CO1

Properties
Chemical formula	C_{4}H_{4}O_{4}
Molar mass	116.072 g·mol^{−1}
- Except where otherwise noted, data are given for materials in their standard state (at 25 °C [77 °F], 100 kPa). Infobox references

Glycolide (1,4-dioxane-2,5-dione) is a dimer of glycolic acid. Its structure is six-membered ring containing two lactones, an oxidized variant of p-dioxane. The compound can be synthesized from glycolic acid, via a high-temperature oligomerization to form polyglycolide followed by a depolymerization process. A more direct method is by self-condensation of the sodium salt of chloroacetic acid. It is useful as a starting material for the production of polyglycolide.
