= Tin(II) 2-ethylhexanoate =

Names
- IUPAC name Tin(2+) bis(2-ethylhexanoate)

Identifiers
CAS Number	301-10-0
3D model (JSmol)	Interactive image
ChemSpider	8957
ECHA InfoCard	100.005.554
PubChem CID	16689712
UNII	519A78R12Y
CompTox Dashboard (EPA)	DTXSID1027138
- InChI: InChI=1S/2C8H16O2.Sn/c2*1-3-5-6-7(4-2)8(9)10;/h2*7H,3-6H2,1-2H3,(H,9,10);/q;;+2/p-2
- SMILES: CCCCC(CC)C(=O)[O-].CCCCC(CC)C(=O)[O-].[Sn+2]

Properties
Chemical formula	C_{16}H_{30}O_{4}Sn
Molar mass	405.122 g·mol^{−1}
Appearance	Yellow liquid
Density	1.251 g/cm^{3}
Melting point	< 0 °C (32 °F; 273 K)
Boiling point	~ 130 to 150 °C (266 to 302 °F; 403 to 423 K) at 30 mTorr
Solubility in water	Degrades in water to form Sn(IV)

Hazards
Flash point	113 °C (235 °F; 386 K) closed cup
- Except where otherwise noted, data are given for materials in their standard state (at 25 °C [77 °F], 100 kPa). Infobox references

Tin(II) 2-ethylhexanoate or tin(II) octoate or stannous octoate (Sn(Oct)_{2}) is the octoate or 2-ethylhexanoate salt of tin. Produced by the reaction of tin(II) oxide and 2-ethylhexanoic acid, it is a clear colorless liquid at room temperature, though often appears yellow due to impurities, likely resulting from oxidation of Sn(II) to Sn(IV).

It is sometimes used as a catalyst for ring-opening polymerization, such as for the production of polylactic acid.
