= Outline of metalworking =

This article is a list of terms commonly used in the practice of metalworking – the science, art, industry, and craft of shaping metal.

== Processes ==
The following is a categorical list of metalworking processes: operations, procedures, techniques, and other actions performed that pertain to or consist of metalworking.

=== Casting ===
Casting is the process of creating objects by filling a mold with molten metal and allowing it to cool.

- Centrifugal
- Continuous
- Die
- Evaporative-pattern
  - Full-mold
  - Lost-foam
- Investment
  - in art: Lost-wax
- Permanent mold
- Plaster mold
- Sand
- Semi-solid metal
- Shaw process
- Shell molding
- Spin

==== Related terms ====
- Foundry
- Crucible
- Molding sand
- Refractory materials

=== Forming ===
Forming is the process of reshaping metal without adding or removing material.

- Hot working
  - Hot rolling
  - Carburizing
  - Drawing
  - Forging
  - Forge weld
  - Oxidising
  - Extruding
- Cold working
  - Coining
  - Cutting
  - Electrohydraulic forming
  - Electromagnetic forming
  - Explosive forming
  - Hydroforming
  - Progressive stamping
  - Punching
  - Rolling
  - Sinking
  - Spinning
  - Swaging
  - Tube bending
  - Bending
  - Shearing
  - Stamping
  - Milling
  - Sanding
  - Grinding
  - Cold forging
  - Cold rolling

=== Cutting ===
- Machining
  - Boring
  - Broaching
  - Drilling
  - Electrical discharge machining
  - Electrochemical machining
  - Electron beam machining
  - Engraving
  - Facing
  - Grinding
  - Hobbing
  - Milling
  - Photochemical machining
  - Turning
  - Ultrasonic machining

=== Joining ===
Joining is the process of creating metal objects by combining pieces of material.

- Brazing
- Crimping
- Riveting
- Soldering
- Welding

=== Finishing ===
Finishing covers all processes that affect the properties or performance of an object without affecting its form or structure.

- Anodizing
- Galvanizing
- Heat treating
  - Annealing
  - Precipitation strengthening
- Mass finishing
- Patination
- Peening
- Plating
- Polishing

=== Welding and soldering ===
- Arc welding
- MIG welding
- TIG welding
- Oxyacetylene welding
- Soldering
- Brazing
- Thermite welding

== Tools ==
- Power tool
- Machine tools
- Anvil
- Forge
- Arbor press
- Drill press
- Lathe
- Milling machine
- Shaper
- Guillotine
- Bender
- Grinding machine
- Band saw

== Physical properties ==
- Ductility
- Malleability
- Hardness
- Hardenability
  - Air hardening
  - Water hardening
  - Oil hardening
- Work hardening
- Case hardening
- Brittle fracture
- Grain size
- Grain orientation
- Crystal twinning

== Metal dust ==
- Metal dust
- Metal swarf
- Shavings
- Filings
- Fines (metal working)
- Scrap
- Grindings
- Turnings
- Dross
- Chips
- Metal powder
- Sparks

== Effects on humans ==
=== Mitigations ===
- Local exhaust ventilation (LEV)
- On-tool extraction

== Steel ==
- Grade of hardware
- Steel abbreviations
- Alloy steel
- Carbon steel
- High-speed steel
- Tool steel
- Stainless steel
- Pickling
- Smooth clean surface

== Machine tool parts ==
- Bed
- Carriage
- Compound rest
- Cross-slide
- Headstock
- Leadscrew
- Spindle
- Tailstock
- Toolpost

== Machine tool accessories ==
- 1-2-3 blocks
- Boring head
- Chuck
- Collets
- Dial indicator
- Indexing head
- Rotary table
- Sine bar
- Vise

== Other ==
- Draw
- Hand scrape (flatness)
- Pitch
- Rivet
- Blue brittleness
- Etching
