= Polylactic acid =

Biodegradable polymer

Names
- IUPAC names Poly(lactic acid); Poly(2-hydroxypropanoic acid)
- Systematic IUPAC name Poly[oxy(1-methyl-2-oxoethylene)]

Identifiers
CAS Number	26100-51-6
ChemSpider	None
CompTox Dashboard (EPA)	DTXSID20904011

Properties
Density	1210–1430 kg/m^{3}
Melting point	150 to 160 °C (302 to 320 °F; 423 to 433 K)
Solubility in water	0 mg/ml

Hazards
NFPA 704 (fire diamond)	0 1 0
- Except where otherwise noted, data are given for materials in their standard state (at 25 °C [77 °F], 100 kPa). Infobox references

Polylactic acid, also known as poly(lactic acid) or polylactide (PLA), is a plastic material. As a thermoplastic polyester (or polyhydroxyalkanoate) it has the backbone formula (C_{3}H_{4}O_{2})_{n} or [–C(CH_{3})HC(=O)O–]_{n}. PLA is formally obtained by condensation of lactic acid C(CH_{3})(OH)HCOOH with loss of water (hence its name). It can also be prepared by ring-opening polymerization of lactide [–C(CH_{3})HC(=O)O–]_{2}, the cyclic dimer of the basic repeating unit. Often PLA is blended with other polymers. PLA can be biodegradable or long-lasting, depending on the manufacturing process, additives, and copolymers.

PLA is economically produced from renewable resources and can be used in compostable products. In 2022, PLA had the highest consumption volume of any bioplastic of the world, with a share of ca. 26% of total bioplastic demand. PLA is the most widely used plastic filament material in FDM 3D printing, due to its low melting point, high strength, low thermal expansion, and good layer adhesion, although it possesses poor heat resistance unless annealed.

Although the name "polylactic acid" is widely used, it does not comply with IUPAC standard nomenclature, which is "poly(lactic acid)". The name "polylactic acid" is potentially ambiguous or confusing, because PLA is not a polyacid, such as a polymer with free carboxylic acid in each monomer, but rather a polyester.

== Chemical properties ==
=== Synthesis ===
The monomer is typically made from fermented plant starch such as from corn, cassava, sugarcane, or sugar beet pulp.

Several industrial routes afford usable (i.e. high molecular weight) PLA. Two main monomers are used: lactic acid, and the cyclic di-ester, lactide. The most common route to PLA is the ring-opening polymerization of lactide with various metal catalysts (typically tin ethylhexanoate) in solution or as a suspension. The metal-catalyzed reaction tends to cause racemization of the PLA, reducing its stereoregularity compared to the starting material (usually corn starch).

The direct condensation of lactic acid monomers can also be used to produce PLA. This process needs to be carried out at less than 200 °C; above that temperature, the entropically favored lactide monomer is generated. This reaction generates one equivalent of water for every condensation (esterification) step. The condensation is a reversible equilibrium reaction, so removal of water is required to generate high molecular weight species. This can be accomplished by performing the reaction under vacuum to evaporate the water or by using azeotropic distillation. Molecular weights of 130 kDa can be obtained this way. Even higher molecular weights can be attained by carefully crystallizing the crude polymer from the melt. Carboxylic acid and alcohol end groups are thus concentrated in the amorphous region of the solid polymer, and so they can react. Molecular weights of 128–152 kDa are obtainable thus.

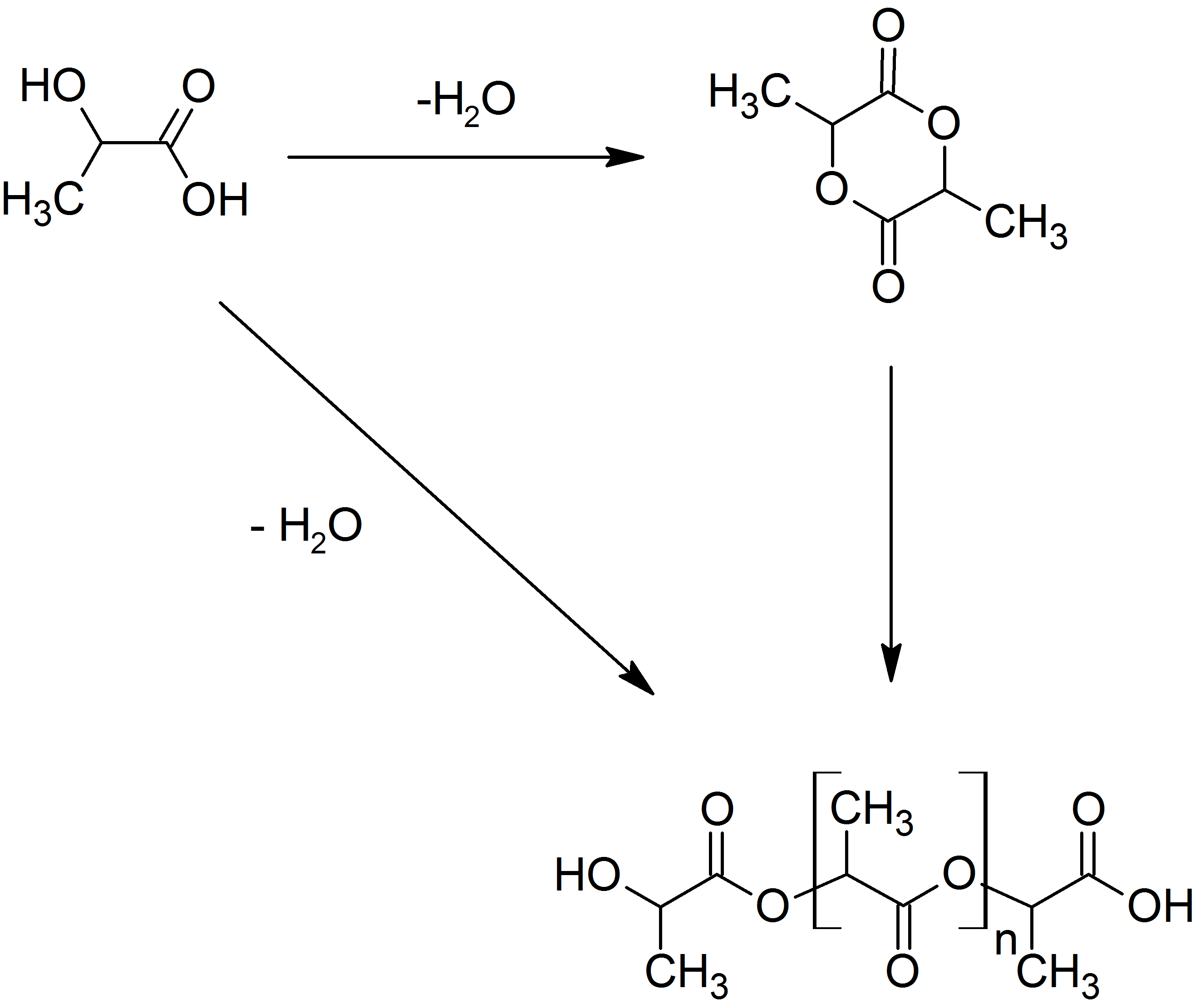

Another method devised is by contacting lactic acid with a zeolite. This condensation reaction is a one-step process, and runs about 100 °C lower in temperature.

=== Stereoisomers ===
Due to the chiral nature of lactic acid, several distinct forms of polylactide exist: poly-L-lactide (PLLA) is the product resulting from polymerization of L,L-lactide (also known as L-lactide). Progress in biotechnology has resulted in the development of commercial production of the D enantiomer form.

Polymerization of a racemic mixture of L- and D-lactides usually leads to the synthesis of poly-DL-lactide (PDLLA), which is amorphous. Use of stereospecific catalysts can lead to heterotactic PLA which has been found to show crystallinity. The degree of crystallinity, and hence many important properties, is largely controlled by the ratio of D to L enantiomers used, and to a lesser extent on the type of catalyst used. Apart from lactic acid and lactide, lactic acid O-carboxyanhydride ("lac-OCA"), a five-membered cyclic compound has been used academically as well. This compound is more reactive than lactide, because its polymerization is driven by the loss of one equivalent of carbon dioxide per equivalent of lactic acid. Water is not a co-product.

The direct biosynthesis of PLA, in a manner similar to production of poly(hydroxyalkanoate)s, has been reported.

== Physical properties ==
PLA polymers range from amorphous glassy polymer to semi-crystalline and highly crystalline polymer with a glass transition 60–65 °C, a melting temperature 130-180 °C, and a Young's modulus 2.7–16 GPa. Heat-resistant PLA can withstand temperatures of 110 °C. The basic mechanical properties of PLA are between those of polystyrene and PET. The melting temperature of PLLA can be increased by 40–50 °C and its heat deflection temperature can be increased from approximately 60 °C to up to 190 °C by physically blending the polymer with PDLA (poly-D-lactide). PDLA and PLLA form a highly regular stereocomplex with increased crystallinity. The temperature stability is maximised when a 1:1 blend is used, but even at lower concentrations of 3–10% of PDLA, there is still a substantial improvement. In the latter case, PDLA acts as a nucleating agent, thereby increasing the crystallization rate. Biodegradation of PDLA is slower than for PLA due to the higher crystallinity of PDLA. The flexural modulus of PLA is higher than polystyrene and PLA has good heat sealability.

Although PLA performs mechanically similar to PET for properties of tensile strength and elastic modulus, the material is very brittle and results in less than 10% elongation at break. Furthermore, this limits PLA's use in applications that require some level of plastic deformation at high stress levels. An effort to increase the elongation at break for PLA has been underway, especially to bolster PLA's presence as a commodity plastic and improve the bioplastics landscape. For example, PLLA biocomposites have been of interest to improve these mechanical properties. By mixing PLLA with poly (3-hydroxy butyrate) (PHB), cellulose nano crystal (CNC) and a plasticizer (TBC), a drastic improvement of mechanical properties were shown. Using polarized optical microscopy (POM), the PLLA biocomposites had smaller spherulites compared to pure PLLA, indicating improved nucleation density and also contributing to an increase of elongation at break from 6% in pure PLLA to 140-190% in the biocomposites. Biocomposites such as these are of great interest for food packaging because of their improved strength and biodegradability.

Several technologies such as annealing, adding nucleating agents, forming composites with fibers or nano-particles, chain extending and introducing crosslink structures have been used to enhance the mechanical properties of PLA polymers. Annealing has been shown to significantly increase the degree of crystallinity of PLA polymers. In one study, increasing the duration of annealing directly affected thermal conductivity, density, and the glass transition temperature. Structural changes from this treatment further improved characteristics such as compressive strength and rigidity by nearly 80%. Processes such as this may boost PLA's presence in the plastics market, as improving the mechanical properties will be important to replace current petroleum-derived plastics. It has also been demonstrated that the addition of a PLA-based, cross-linked nucleating agent improved the degree of crystallinity of the final PLA material. Alongside the use of the nucleating agent, annealing was shown to further improve the degree of crystallinity and, therefore, the toughness and flexural modulus of the material. This example reveals the ability to utilize multiple of these processes to reinforce the mechanical properties of PLA. Polylactic acid can be processed like most thermoplastics into fiber (for example, using conventional melt spinning processes) and film. PLA has similar mechanical properties to PETE polymer, but has a significantly lower maximum continuous use temperature.

Backbone architecture of PLA and its effect on crystallization kinetics has also been investigated, specifically to better understand the most suitable processing conditions for PLA. The molecular weight of polymer chains can play a significant role in the mechanical properties. One method of increasing molecular weight is by introducing branches of the same polymer chain onto the backbone. Through characterization of a branched and linear grade PLA, branched PLA leads to faster crystallization. Furthermore, the branched PLA experiences much longer relaxation times at low shear rates, contributing to higher viscosity than the linear grade. This is presumed to be from high molecular weight regions within the branched PLA. However, the branched PLA was observed to shear thin more strongly, leading to a much lower viscosity at high shear rates. Understanding properties such as these are crucial when determining optimal processing conditions for materials, and that simple changes to the structure can alter its behavior dramatically.

Racemic PLA and pure PLLA have low glass transition temperatures, making them undesirable because of low strength and melting point. A stereocomplex of PDLA and PLLA has a higher glass transition temperature, lending it more mechanical strength.

The high surface energy of PLA results in good printability, making it widely used in 3D printing. The tensile strength for 3D printed PLA was previously determined.

=== Solvents ===
PLA is soluble in a range of organic solvents. Ethyl acetate is widely used because of its ease of access and low risk. It is useful in 3D printers for cleaning the extruder heads and for removing PLA supports.

Other "green solvents" include propylene carbonate. Pyridine can be used, but it has a distinct fish odor and is less safe than ethyl acetate. PLA is also soluble in hot benzene, tetrahydrofuran, and dioxane.

== Fabrication ==
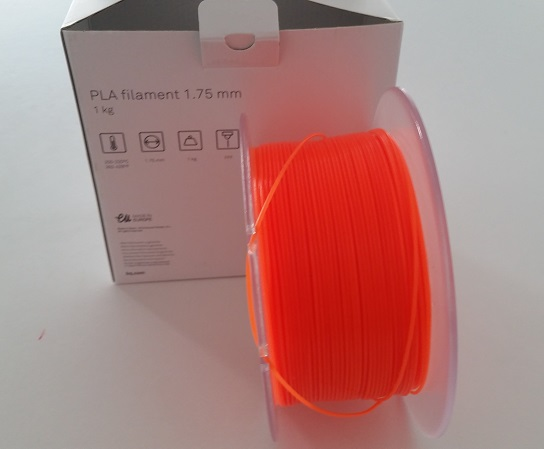
PLA filament for use in 3D printing

PLA objects can be fabricated by 3D printing, casting, injection moulding, extrusion, machining, and solvent welding.

PLA is used as a feedstock material in desktop fused filament fabrication by 3D printers, such as RepRap printers.

PLA can be solvent welded using dichloromethane. Acetone also softens the surface of PLA, making it sticky without dissolving it, for welding to another PLA surface.

PLA-printed solids can be encased in plaster-like moulding materials, then burned out in a furnace, so that the resulting void can be filled with molten metal. This is known as "lost PLA casting", a type of investment casting.

== Applications ==
PLA is mainly used for short-lived and disposable packaging. In 2022, of the total PLA production, ca. 35% was used for flexible packaging (e.g. films, bags, labels) and 30% for rigid packaging (e.g. bottles, jars, containers).

=== Consumer goods ===
PLA is used in a large variety of consumer products such as disposable tableware, cutlery, housings for kitchen appliances and electronics such as laptops and handheld devices, and microwavable trays. (However, PLA is not suitable for microwavable containers because of its low glass transition temperature.) It is used for compost bags, food packaging and loose-fill packaging material that is cast, injection molded, or spun. In the form of a film, it shrinks upon heating, allowing it to be used in shrink tunnels. In the form of fibers, it is used for monofilament fishing line and netting. In the form of nonwoven fabrics, it is used for upholstery, disposable garments, awnings, feminine hygiene products, and diapers.

PLA has applications in engineering plastics, where the stereocomplex is blended with a rubber-like polymer such as ABS. Such blends have good form stability and visual transparency, making them useful in low-end packaging applications.

PLA is used for automotive parts such as floor mats, panels, and covers. Its heat resistance and durability are inferior to the widely used polypropylene (PP), but its properties are improved by means such as capping of the end groups to reduce hydrolysis.

PLA was once used in some Sun Chips bags from 2008 through 2010, though these were eventually discontinued due the loud noise the bags produced when handled, around 95 dB.

PLA is also one of the most common filaments used in 3D printing.

=== Agricultural ===
In the form of fibers, PLA is used for monofilament fishing line and netting for vegetation and weed prevention. It is used for sandbags, planting pots, binding tape, and ropes .

=== Medical ===
PLA can degrade into innocuous lactic acid, making it suitable for use as medical implants in the form of anchors, screws, plates, pins, rods, mesh, and surgical sutures. Depending on the type used, it breaks down inside the body within 6 months to 2 years. This gradual degradation is desirable for a support structure, because it gradually transfers the load to the body (e.g., to the bone) as that area heals. The strength characteristics of PLA and PLLA implants and surgical sutures are well documented.

Thanks to its bio-compatibility and biodegradability, PLA found interest as a polymeric scaffold for drug delivery purposes.

The composite blend of poly(L-lactide-co-D,L-lactide) (PLDLLA) with tricalcium phosphate (TCP) is used as PLDLLA/TCP scaffolds for bone engineering.

Poly-L-lactic acid (PLLA) is the active ingredient in Sculptra, an injectable filler used for adding volume to the face, particularly for HIV-associated lipodystrophy.

PLLA is used to stimulate collagen synthesis in fibroblasts via foreign body reaction in the presence of macrophages. Macrophages act as a stimulant in secretion of cytokines and mediators such as TGF-β, which stimulate the fibroblast to secrete collagen into the surrounding tissue. Therefore, PLLA has potential applications in the dermatological studies.

PLLA is under investigation as a scaffold that can generate a small amount of electric current via the piezoelectric effect that stimulates the growth of mechanically robust cartilage in multiple animal models.

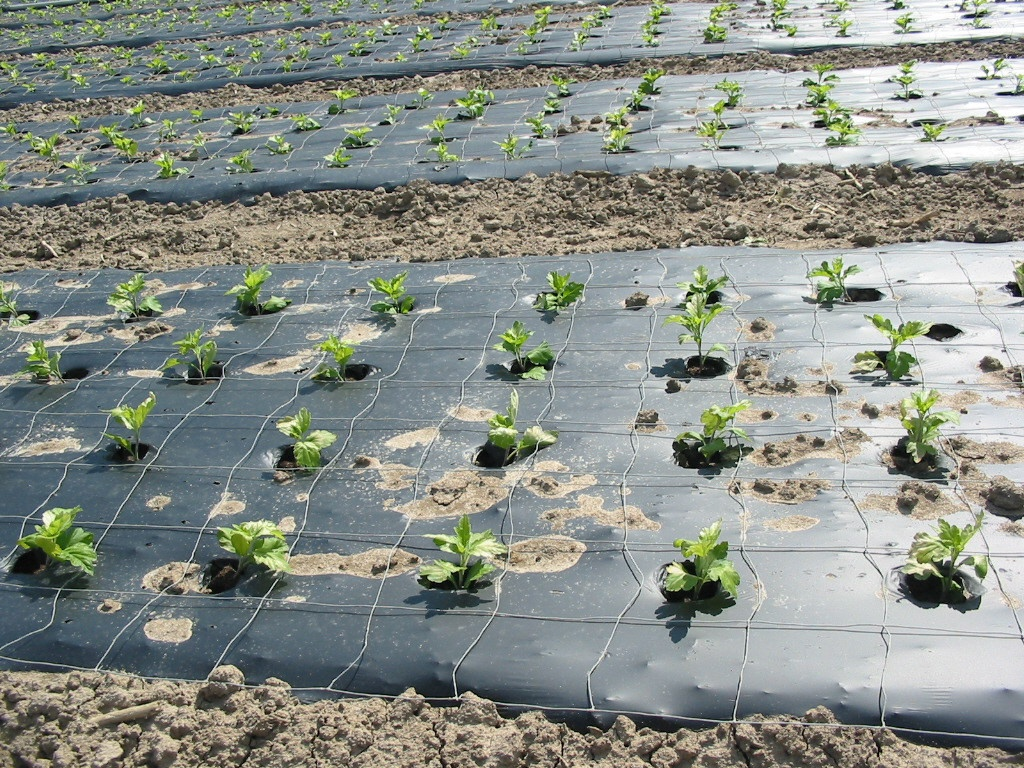
Mulch film made of PLA-blend "bio-flex"

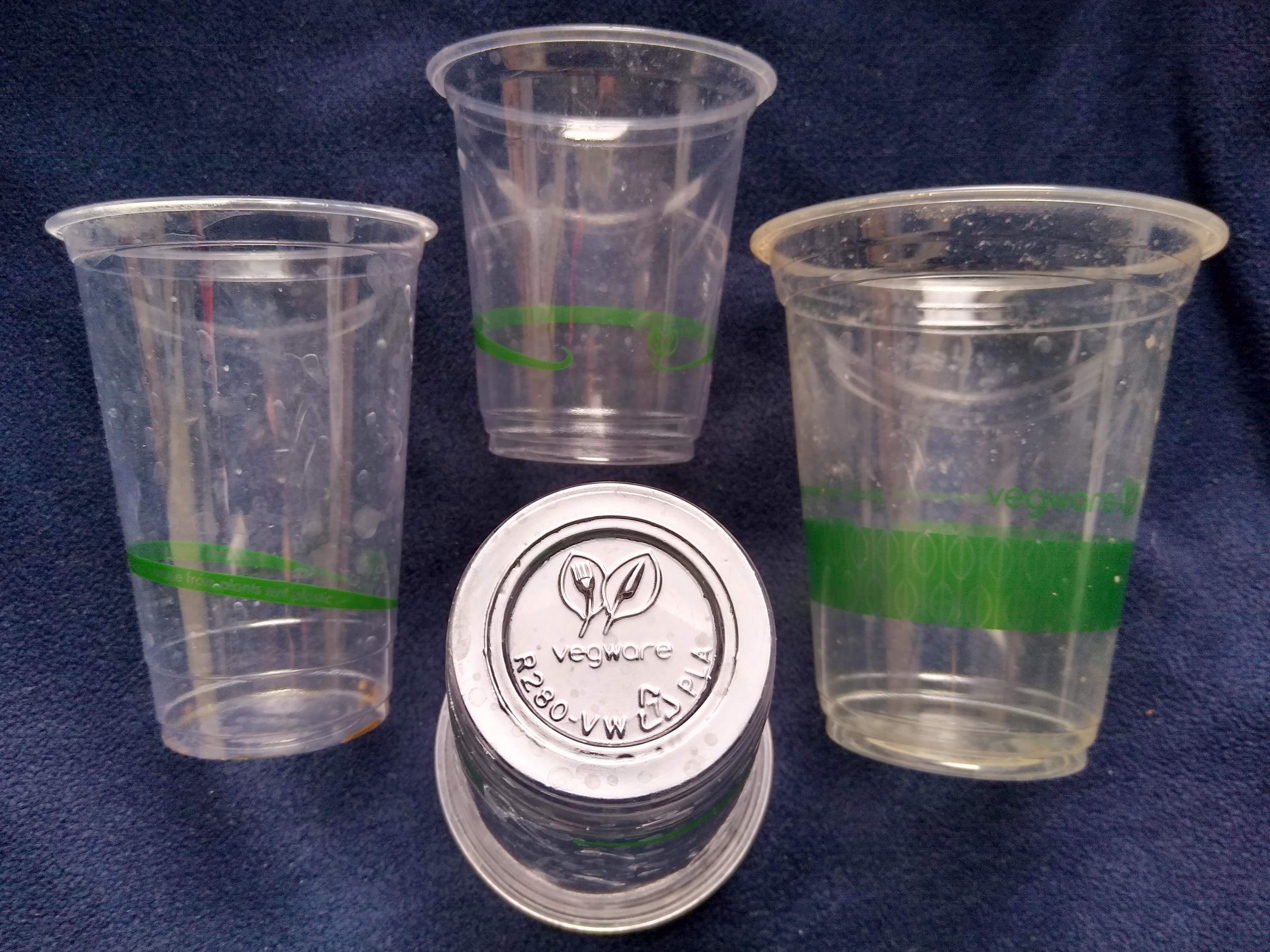
Biodegradable PLA cups

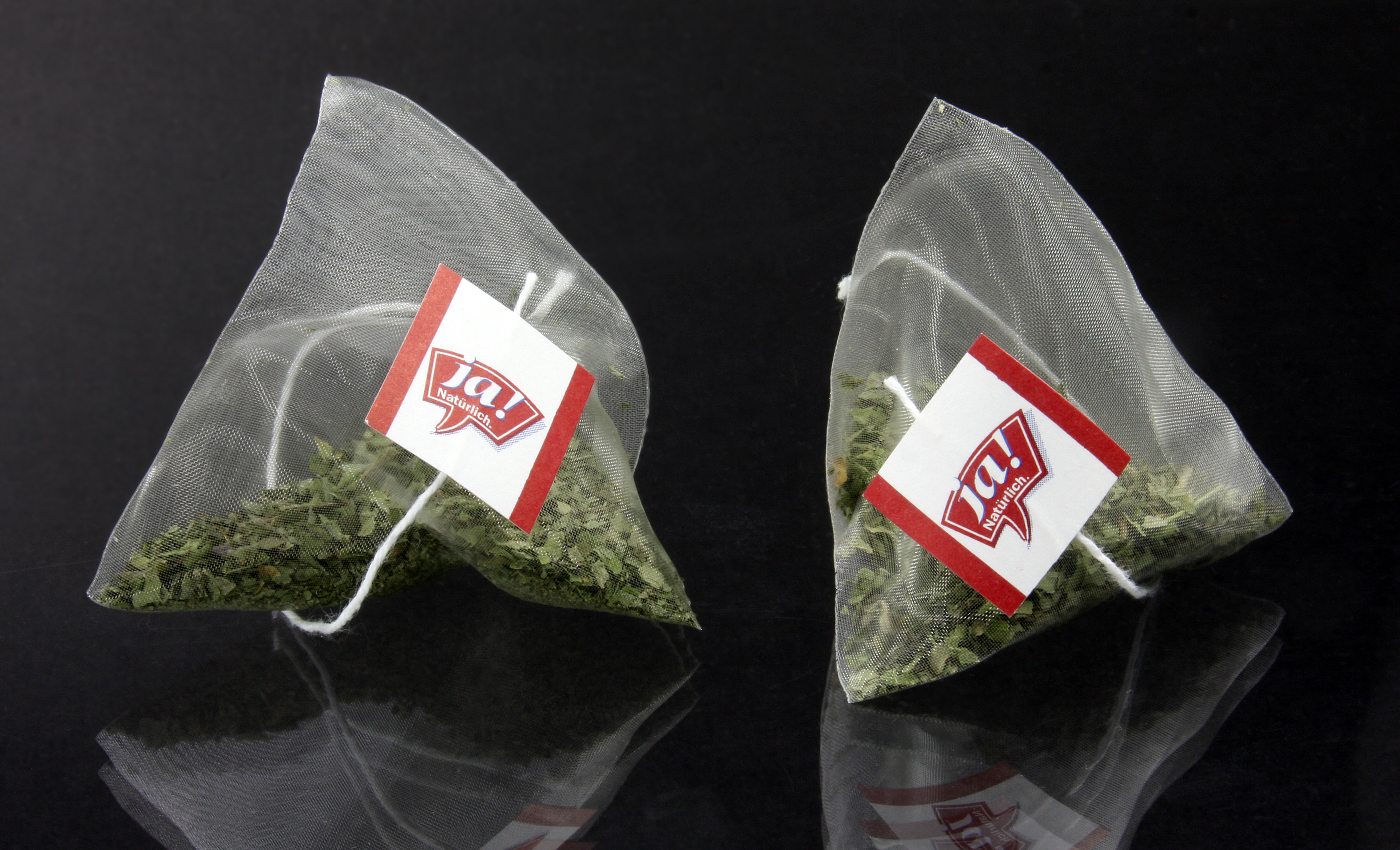
Tea bags made of PLA. Peppermint tea is enclosed.

3D printing of a microcoil using a conductive mixture of polylactide and carbon nanotubes.

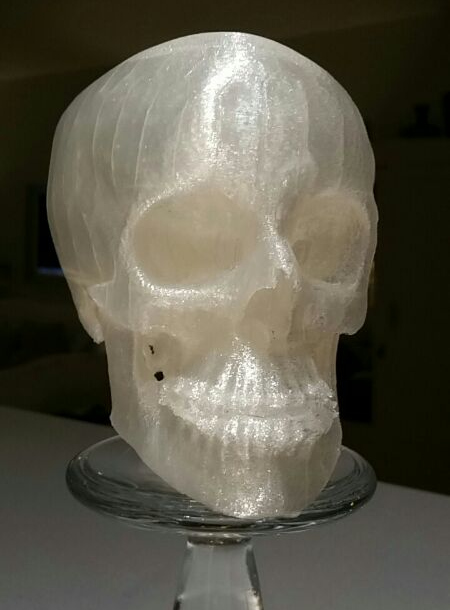
3D printed human skull with data from computed tomography. Transparent PLA.

== Degradation ==
PLA is compostable. Rates vary with the particular isomer. As illustrated by its use in medicine, PLA degrades mainly by hydrolysis. The degradation product is innocuous lactic acid. In the body, full degradation requires 6 months to 2 years. The degradation in seawater is also of interest. It degrades poorly in landfills and household composts at lower temperatures, but is effectively digested in hotter industrial composts, usually degrading best at temperatures of over 60 °C (140 °F).

PLA can also be hydrolyzed with sodium hydroxide (NaOH), the higher the concentration the greater the rate; a preliminary study found that hydrolyzed PLA can be converted into feedstock for single cell protein.

Pure PLA foams are selectively hydrolysed in Dulbecco's modified Eagle's medium (DMEM) supplemented with fetal bovine serum (FBS) (a solution mimicking body fluid). After 30 days of submersion in DMEM+FBS, a PLLA scaffold lost about 20% of its weight.

PLA samples of various molecular weights were degraded into methyl lactate (a green solvent) by using a metal complex catalyst.

PLA can also be degraded by some bacteria, such as Amycolatopsis and Saccharothrix. A purified protease from Amycolatopsis sp., PLA depolymerase, can also degrade PLA. Enzymes such as pronase and most effectively proteinase K from Tritirachium album degrade PLA.

== Environmental impacts ==
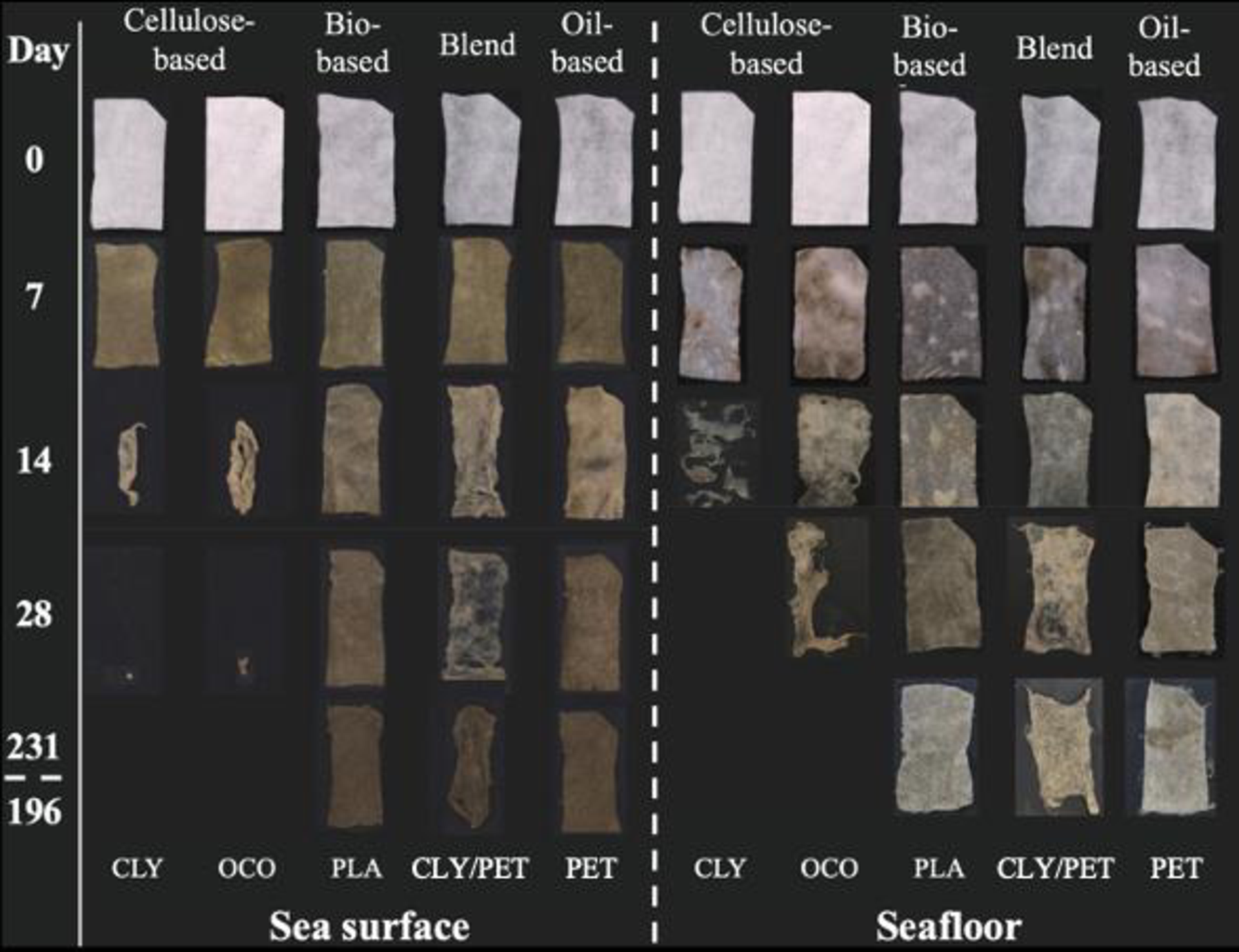
The degradation of PLA and PET at the sea surface and seafloor over time. The degradation of PLA closely mirrors that of PET, suggesting PLA degrades similarly to petroleum-based plastics in seawater.

Although PLA is a bio-based polymer, its marketing as a bioplastic can be misleading in understanding its ability to biodegrade. While PLA can sometimes degrade enzymatically, its major degradation route is through thermal decomposition requiring a minimum temperature of 60 °C and depending on other factors such as moisture and oxygen. Complete degradation of PLA generally requires conditions only achievable through industrial composting, and it can take close to three decades to achieve full biodegradation of PLA in environments such as home compost and soil.

In situ experiments have shown that PLA does not fully disintegrate under normal marine conditions at the sea surface or seafloor after 231 and 196 days, respectively, or after 428 days in an open-circuit natural seawater aquarium. PLA also exhibited similar rates of degradation in the ocean as polyethylene terephthalate (PET), a petroleum-based plastic used for similar applications. Once PLA is introduced to the marine environment, it can contribute to microplastic production through mechanical shearing and UV induced photodegradation.

PLA has been shown to have varying levels of toxicity to marine organisms. An appropriate LC_{50} has not been calculated for most species, but existing published values are generally not environmentally relevant. However, PLA has displayed significant acute and chronic non-lethal effects on many organisms across the food chain, including marine amphipods, sea urchin larvae, zebrafish, and mussels. Effects vary across organisms but notably include oxidative stress and differentiated behavior and morphology in zebrafish and suppressed gene expression related to byssal plaque in mussels. Many studies have shown that aged PLA (via mechanical weathering and photodegradation) has a significantly greater toxic effect on marine organisms likely due to toxic transformation products and the production of nanoplastics.

== End of life ==
PLA has SPI resin ID code 7

Four possible end-of-life scenarios are the most common:

1. Recycling: which can be either chemical or mechanical. Currently, the SPI resin identification code 7 ("others") is applicable for PLA. In Belgium, Galactic started the first pilot unit to chemically recycle PLA (Loopla). Unlike mechanical recycling, chemical recycling is tolerant of contaminants in the waste material feedstock. Polylactic acid can be chemically recycled to monomer by thermal depolymerization or hydrolysis. When purified, the monomer can be used for the manufacturing of virgin PLA with no loss of original properties (cradle-to-cradle recycling). End-of-life PLA can be chemically recycled to methyl lactate by transesterification.
2. Composting: PLA is biodegradable under industrial composting conditions, starting with chemical hydrolysis process, followed by microbial digestion, to ultimately degrade the PLA. Under industrial composting conditions (58 °C (136 °F)), PLA can partly (about half) decompose into water and carbon dioxide in 60 days, after which the remainder decomposes much more slowly, with the rate depending on the material's degree of crystallinity. Environments without the necessary conditions will see very slow decomposition akin to that of non-bioplastics, not fully decomposing for hundreds or thousands of years.
3. Incineration: PLA can be incinerated without producing chlorine-containing chemicals or heavy metals because it contains only carbon, oxygen, and hydrogen atoms. Since it does not contain chlorine it does not produce dioxins or hydrochloric acid during incineration, PLA can be combusted with no remaining residue. This and other results suggest that incineration is an environmentally friendly disposal of waste PLA. Upon being incinerated, PLA can release carbon dioxide.
4. Landfill: the least preferable option is landfilling because PLA degrades very slowly in ambient temperatures, often as slowly as other plastics.

== See also ==
- Acrylonitrile butadiene styrene (ABS) - also used for 3D printing
- Cellophane, polyglycolide, plastarch material, poly-3-hydroxybutyrate – biologically derived polymers
- Polilactofate
- Polycaprolactone
- Zein, shellac – biologically derived coating materials
- Poly(methyl methacrylate)
