= C4H4O4 =

The molecular formula C_{4}H_{4}O_{4} (molar mass: 116.07 g/mol) may refer to:

- Diglycolic anhydride
- Fumaric acid
- Glycolide
- Lactic acid O-carboxyanhydride
- Maleic acid
- Succinate (deprotonated form)
