= Matthew Sands =

American accelerator physicist

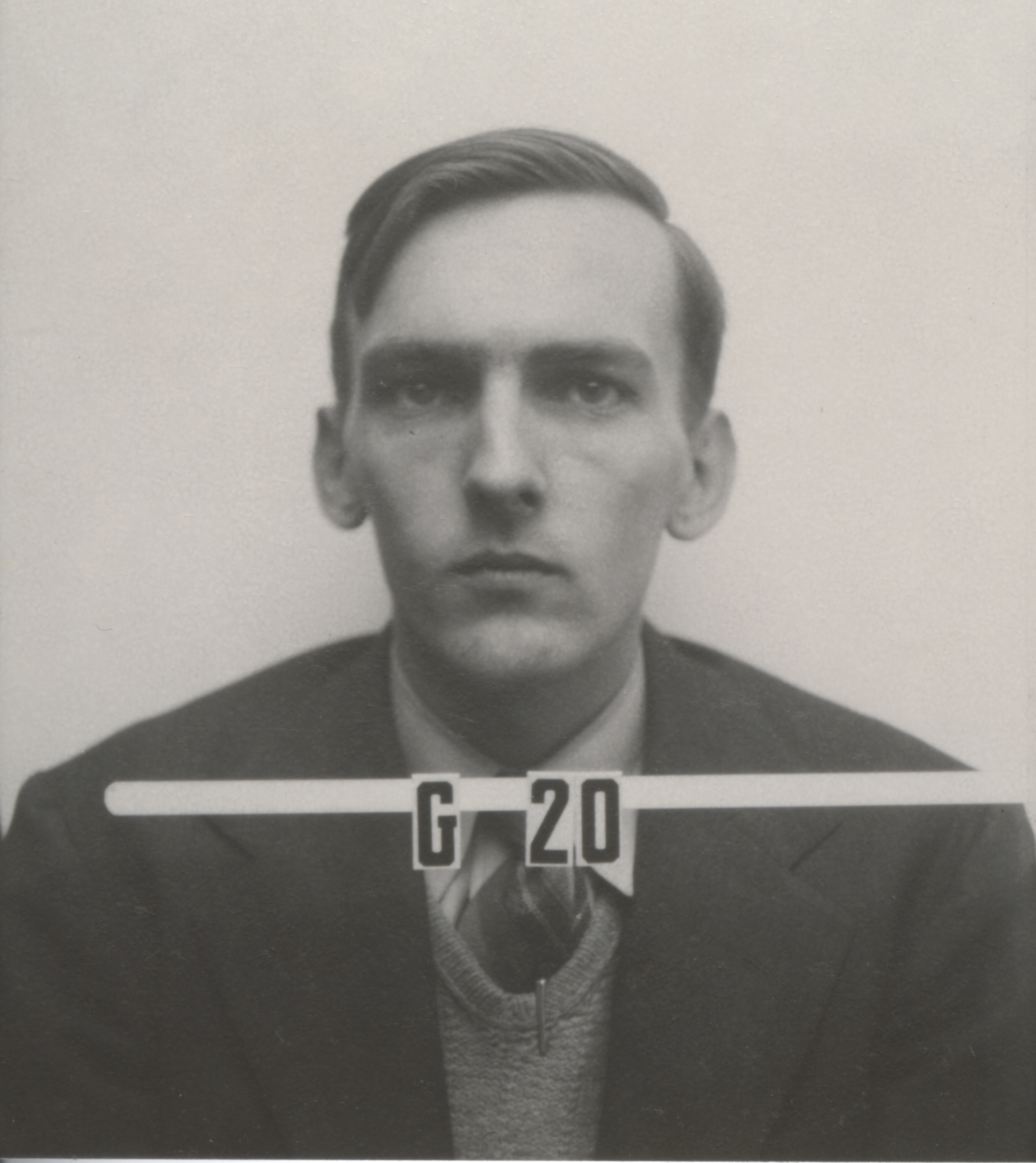
- Matthew L. Sands Los Alamos ID badge photo
- Born: October 20, 1919; Oxford, Massachusetts
- Died: September 13, 2014 (aged 94); Santa Cruz, California
- Education: Massachusetts Institute of Technology; Clark University; Rice University
- Known for: Co-author of The Feynman Lectures on Physics
- Awards: Robert R. Wilson Prize (1998)
- Scientific career
- Fields: Accelerator physics
- Workplaces: Los Alamos National Laboratory; Massachusetts Institute of Technology; California Institute of Technology; Stanford Linear Accelerator Center; University of California, Santa Cruz
- Thesis: The meson component of cosmic radiation (1948)
- Doctoral advisor: Bruno Rossi

Matthew Linzee Sands (October 20, 1919 – September 13, 2014) was an American physicist and educator best known as a co-author of the Feynman Lectures on Physics. A graduate of Rice University, Sands served with the Naval Ordnance Laboratory and the Manhattan Project's Los Alamos Laboratory during World War II.

After the war, Sands studied cosmic rays for his doctorate at the Massachusetts Institute of Technology (MIT) under the supervision of Bruno Rossi. Sands went to the California Institute of Technology (Caltech) in 1950, and helped build and operate its 1.5 GeV electron synchrotron. He became deputy director for the construction and early operation of the Stanford Linear Accelerator Center (SLAC) in 1963. Sands later joined the University of California, Santa Cruz (UCSC) as a professor of physics, and served as its Vice Chancellor for Science from 1969 to 1972. In 1998, The American Physical Society awarded him the Robert R. Wilson Prize "for his many contributions to accelerator physics and the development of electron-positron and proton colliders."

== Early life and education ==
Matthew Linzee Sands was born in Oxford, Massachusetts, on October 20, 1919. His parents were Linzee Sands and Beatrice Goyette, both of whom were bookkeepers. He had a brother, Roger, and a sister, Claire, who was seven years younger. As a 12-year-old Boy Scout, Sands was motivated by his scoutmaster, who was a radio amateur, to build his own shortwave radio receiver. With the aid of information from the Radio Amateur's Handbook, he constructed it out of parts scavenged from old radios. He was encouraged to study mathematics and science by his high school math teacher, John Chafee, a graduate of Brown University.

After high school, Sands entered Clark University, where he studied physics and mathematics, and eventually received his Bachelor of Arts (B.A.) in 1940. At Clark, his physics professors were Theodore P. Jorgensen, who became famous for his book "The Physics of Golf", and Percy M. Roope, who participated in the rocket experiments of Robert H. Goddard. As part of a job subsidized at 35 cents per hour by the National Youth Administration, they assigned him to build physics equipment in the machine shops, where he became familiar with the drill press, lathe, and other metalworking tools.

Sand went on to receive his Master of Arts (M.A.) in physics from Rice University. At Rice, Sands took graduate courses in relativity, statistical mechanics, and thermodynamics from Harold A. Wilson, who was the first chair of the Rice physics department. He also completed experimental studies of ferromagnetism. At Rice, Sands met his first wife, Elizabeth, an undergraduate student there.

== World War II ==
In 1941, Sands went to the Naval Ordnance Laboratory in Washington, D.C., where he learned more about electronics under Joseph F. Keithley. Keithly and Sands developed two influence mines, from which three patents were derived. They performed sea tests of a working prototype, but the program was stopped for unknown reasons.

By 1943, Sands had become impatient with the Navy's bureaucracy. After discussing the situation with Wilson, he appeared unannounced in Santa Fe, New Mexico, at the office of Dorothy McKibbin, who had been designated to meet newcomers to Los Alamos Laboratory. After she made a telephone call to the personnel office, which had just received a desperate call for electronics people, Sands was bussed to Los Alamos. To his surprise, he was met by Jorgenson, who had just joined the Manhattan Project after leaving Clark and going to Nebraska. He immediately took Sands to the library to read Robert Serber's Los Alamos Primer, which introduced him to the basic physical principles of nuclear fission as they were known at the time, and their implications for nuclear weapon design.

By this time, Sands had extensive experience with electronics and was immediately thrust into the electronics group, which was tasked with making instruments for the whole laboratory, and whose head was Darol Froman. Within this group, his close collaborators were William Elmore, William Higinbotham, and Ernest Titterton. Anybody who had an instrumentation problem would come to the group for help. As a result, Sands worked with Luis Alvarez, Robert Bacher, Hans Bethe, Richard Feynman, Otto Frisch, Bruno Rossi, Emilio Segrè, Robert Walker and Robert Wilson; many of these famous physicists played important roles in his later career. In particular, he formed a close relationship with Rossi, with whom he later decided to work on his post-war Ph.D. degree. Rossi was most interested in the group's nuclear electronics equipment: pulse counters and amplifiers, discriminators, and scalers. In this area, Sands designed and patented a pulse height analyzer, and with Otto Frisch and Elmore, a pulse amplifier. He also created electronics for more general purposes, such as precise temperature regulation, and control of electroplating operations.

In 1945, the Los Alamos Laboratory carried out the Trinity nuclear test at a remote site near Alamogordo, New Mexico. Sands worked with Walker on a piezoelectric pressure measurement of the atmospheric shock wave produced by "the gadget", a prototype of the Fat Man weapon later dropped on Nagasaki. Their instrumentation worked well during a test explosion of 108 tons of TNT in May 1945, but no information was obtained during the Trinity test on July 16, 1945, because an unexpected rain shower the night before soaked the apparatus.

To raise public consciousness of issues raised by Trinity, David Hawkins, William Higinbotham, Philip Morrison, Robert Wilson, Sands, and others formed the Los Alamos Association of Atomic Scientists. As a founding member, Sands put out its weekly newsletter. On November 30, 1945, this organization merged with similar groups within the Manhattan Project and at Oak Ridge to form the Federation of Atomic Scientists, which soon changed its name to the Federation of American Scientists (FAS).

In 1946, Sands and Elmore wrote "Electronics: Experimental Techniques", which was published in 1949 by McGraw-Hill. This book presented many ideas and circuits developed at Los Alamos, and became a standard reference for post-war nuclear instrumentation.

== Massachusetts Institute of Technology ==
After the success of the Manhattan Project and the Radiation Laboratory, the Massachusetts Institute of Technology (MIT) moved into a new era of "big science" funded by the US government. This era was predicted in a 1945 report, Science, The Endless Frontier, written by Vannevar Bush, who was an MIT graduate and influential head of the wartime Office of Scientific Research and Development. MIT's expansion into physics was encouraged by its president Karl Compton and by the head of the physics department, John C. Slater. The expansion of nuclear physics at MIT was spearheaded by Jerrold R. Zacharias, who joined the Los Alamos Laboratory late in the war, and recruited Bruno Rossi and Victor Weisskopf as MIT professors.

Within MIT's new Laboratory for Nuclear Science, headed by Zacharias, Rossi was assigned to create a cosmic ray research group. He recruited four young scientists who had been at Los Alamos, including Sands, and two who had been in the Radiation Laboratory, as Ph.D. candidates. All were more mature than typical graduate students, with several years of wartime research experience. They were paid a stipend similar to that of a postdoctoral researcher, which enabled them to support families during their graduate studies. The laboratory was funded by the Office of Naval Research.

With Rossi as his academic advisor, and with the aid of a Boeing B-29 Superfortress aircraft borrowed from the United States Air Force, Sands carried out his thesis research on the slow muon component of cosmic rays. He measured the intensity of low energy muons as a function of altitude up to 40,000 feet (12,000 m), and derived their spectrum at production and as they propagated through the atmosphere. This information was important because most atmospheric cosmic rays are muons. Sands received his Ph.D. in physics from MIT in 1948, writing his thesis on "The meson component of cosmic radiation". Sands then joined the faculty as an assistant professor, and continued his cosmic ray research in Rossi's group.

Another project of the Laboratory for Nuclear Science was a synchrotron particle accelerator, which was designed to accelerate electrons to an energy of 350 MeV. The accelerator was funded by the Office of Naval Research and built under the supervision of Ivan A. Getting, who was a professor of electrical engineering and had worked at the Radiation Laboratory on the extremely successful SCR-584 radar. Although its construction began in 1946, the accelerator had not begun to work by 1949. In response, Zacharias asked Sands to assist. This was Sands's introduction to accelerator physics, and with his help the machine became operational early in 1950.

In 1948, Sands divorced his first wife, Elizabeth, in Reno, Nevada. She remained in Weston, Massachusetts, with their two children, while Sands married Eunice Hawthorne, a sister-in-law of his high school math teacher, John Chafee, and moved with her into MIT's Westgate housing units for married students. In early 1950, in his words:

... my ex-wife had a father who had a fair amount of money, and they decided to make trouble for me, and were going to throw me in jail as a bigamist because they claimed my (Reno) divorce was not legal and so on. So I'm famous around MIT as the person who had to leave in the middle of the night and not come back.

== Later life ==
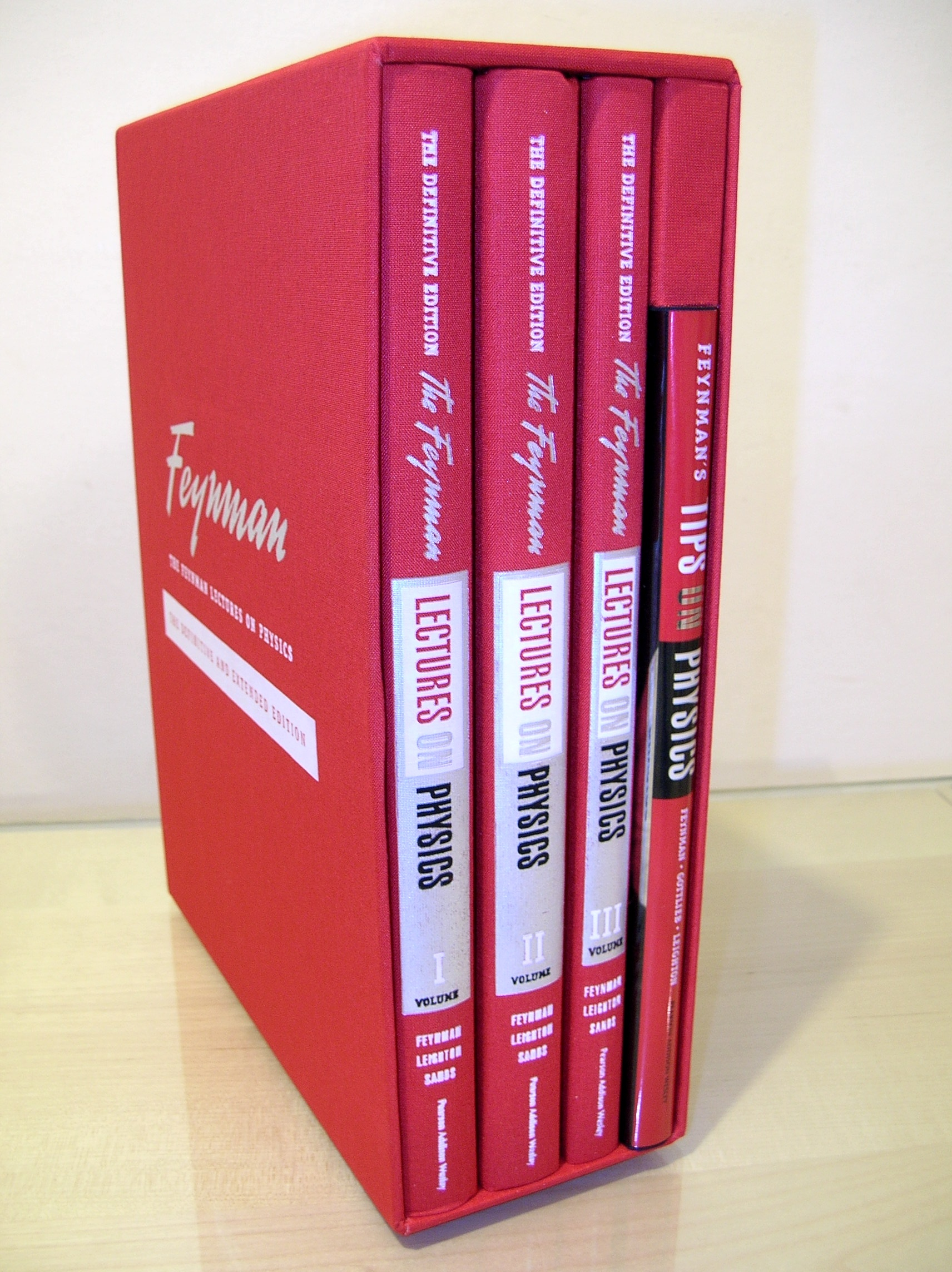
The Feynman Lectures on Physics including Feynman's Tips on Physics: The Definitive and Extended Edition (2005)

Sands went to the California Institute of Technology (Caltech), where he helped build and operate a 1.5 GeV electron synchrotron. He was the first to demonstrate, both theoretically and experimentally, the role of quantum effects in electron particle accelerators. He also studied beam instabilities, wake fields, beam-cavity interactions, and other phenomena.

In 1963, Sands became deputy director for the construction and early operation of the Stanford Linear Accelerator Center (SLAC). When Richard Feynman was deciding whether or not to accept the 1965 Nobel Prize—due to a disdain for the added notoriety it might bring—Sands convinced Feynman that not accepting it would bring even more attention. Sands later joined the University of California, Santa Cruz (UCSC) as a professor of physics, and served as its Vice Chancellor for science from 1969 to 1972. After retiring from UCSC in 1985, Sands worked as a consultant for SLAC and also as a consultant for Bay View Elementary School and Santa Cruz High School in Santa Cruz, California, developing computer systems and physics lab activities for students.

From 1960 to 1966, Sands served on the Commission on College Physics, which carried out a national program to modernize physics instruction in the colleges and universities of the United States. He helped Feynman and Robert B. Leighton write the 1964 physics textbook Feynman Lectures on Physics, based upon the lectures given by Feynman to undergraduate students at Caltech between 1961 and 1963. He was involved in the creation of Kresge College, where he met Freya Kidner, a student there who subsequently became his third wife. He received a Distinguished Service Award from the American Association of Physics Teachers in 1972, and in 1998 the American Physical Society awarded him the Robert R. Wilson Prize "for his many contributions to accelerator physics and the development of electron-positron and proton colliders."

Sands died in Santa Cruz on September 13, 2014. He was survived by his wife Freya, his daughter, Michelle, sons Michael and Richard, and brother Roger.
