= PSM =

PSM, an acronym, may refer to:

== Organizations ==
- Pakistan School Muscat, a Pakistani co-educational institute in Oman
- Palestine Solidarity Movement, a student organization in the United States
- Panhellenic Socialist Movement, a centre-left party in Greece
- Parti Socialiste Mauricien, a political party in Mauritius, founded by Harish Boodhoo
- Parti Sosialis Malaysia, a socialist political party in Malaysia
- Sepaktakraw Association of Malaysia (Malay: Persatuan Sepaktakraw Malaysia; PSM), a national governing body in Malaysia
- Photographic Society of Madras, a not for profit organisation involved in promoting photography, in Chennai
- PlayStation: The Official Magazine, a magazine originally known as PlayStation Magazine or PSM
- Ponce School of Medicine, a post-graduate medical school located in Ponce, Puerto Rico
- Power Systems Manufacturing, a subsidiary of Alstom, specializing in aftermarket gas turbine servicing for power generating industry.
- Poznańska Spółdzielnia Mieszkaniowa, a housing cooperative administering most of the Piątkowo district of Poznań, Poland
- Providence St. Mel School, a school in Chicago, USA
- PSM3, a UK video game magazine specializing in Sony consoles
- PSM Makassar, a football club that plays in the Liga Indonesia
- PSM-Nationalist Agreement, a federation of regionalist or progressive-stateless nationalist political parties in the Balearic Islands
- Public Service Media, media whose primary mission is public service

== Scholarship ==
- Professional Science Master's, a postgraduate academic degree program established by the Council of Graduate Schools
- The Protocols of the Elders of Zion, acronym for Protokoly sionskix mudrecov or The Protocols of the Elders of Zion, a tract alleging a Judeo-Masonic plot for world domination

== Science ==
- Paraspinal musculature, the muscles adjacent to the vertebral column
- Peptide spectrum match, a (possible) identified peptide in a protein mass spectrometry identification experiment
- Phase-shift keying, or Phase Shift Modulation, a digital modulation scheme
- Phase-shift mask, photomasks that take advantage of interference to improve image resolution in photolithography
- Phenol-soluble modulin, a family of protein toxins produced by CA-MRSA
- Phenomenal self model, in consciousness what comprises experiences of ownership, of first person perspective, and of a long-term unity of beliefs and attitudes
- Phono-semantic matching, a term in linguistics that refers to camouflaged borrowing
- Plastarch material, or PSM, a biodegradable and thermoplastic resin
- Platform-specific model, a model of a software or business system that is linked to a specific technological platform
- Propensity score matching, a statistical method used to provide unbiased estimation of treatment-effects
- Problem structuring methods, a methodological framing of a range of techniques in soft operational research (soft OR)

== Locations ==
- Pasar Minggu railway station, a railway station in Jakarta, Indonesia
- Port St Mary, a port town in the south of the Isle of Man
- Portsmouth International Airport at Pease, IATA code PSM, a public-use joint civil-military airport
- El Puerto de Santa María, a city located on the banks of the Guadalete River in the province of Cádiz, Spain

== Medicine ==
- Preventive and social medicine, in areas of prevention, promotion and treatment of rehabilitative diseases

== Other uses ==
- "Paranoia Survivor Max", a song by 290 from the music video game Dance Dance Revolution Extreme
- Permanent Magnet Synchronous Motor
- Permanent staff member, e.g., for a congressional committee
- Persistent Stored Modules, an ISO standard mainly defining an extension of SQL
- Plant (or Potato) Starch Material, generic label for compostable plant-based materials used as alternatives to plastics for items such as disposable cutlery, broader meaning than Plastarch
- Platoon Sergeant Major, a short-lived rank in the British Army of Warrant Officer Class III
- PlayStation Mobile, the software framework
- PlayStation Move, the motion controller for PlayStation 3
- Policy Simulation Model, a static microsimulation model which encapsulates the tax and benefits system, and population, of Great Britain
- Portia Simpson-Miller, former Prime Minister of Jamaica
- Post-stall maneuver
- Poste sanitaire mobile, a type of French Field hospitals (France)
- Van Westendorp's Price Sensitivity Meter, a market technique for determining consumer price preferences
- Pro Stock Motorcycle, a drag racing class of motorcycle that is the two-wheeled equivalent of Pro Stock
- Process safety management, a practice intended to prevent major accidents in the process industries
- Process Safety Management (OSHA regulation), implementing process safety management in the United States
- Professional Scrum Master, a recognized certification for Scrum Master role in Scrum (software development)
- Professional Securities Market, an equity market of the London Stock Exchange
- Protocol/Service Multiplexer, a port number in Bluetooth L2CAP
- ProTracker Studio format, a module file format that was used in many games published by Epic Games in the early 1990s
- PSM pistol, a self-defense firearm for law enforcement and military officers of the USSR
- Public Service Medal (Australia), a civil decoration awarded to personnel of all levels of the Australian Public Service for outstanding service
