= MACHO catalyst =

Class of chemical compounds

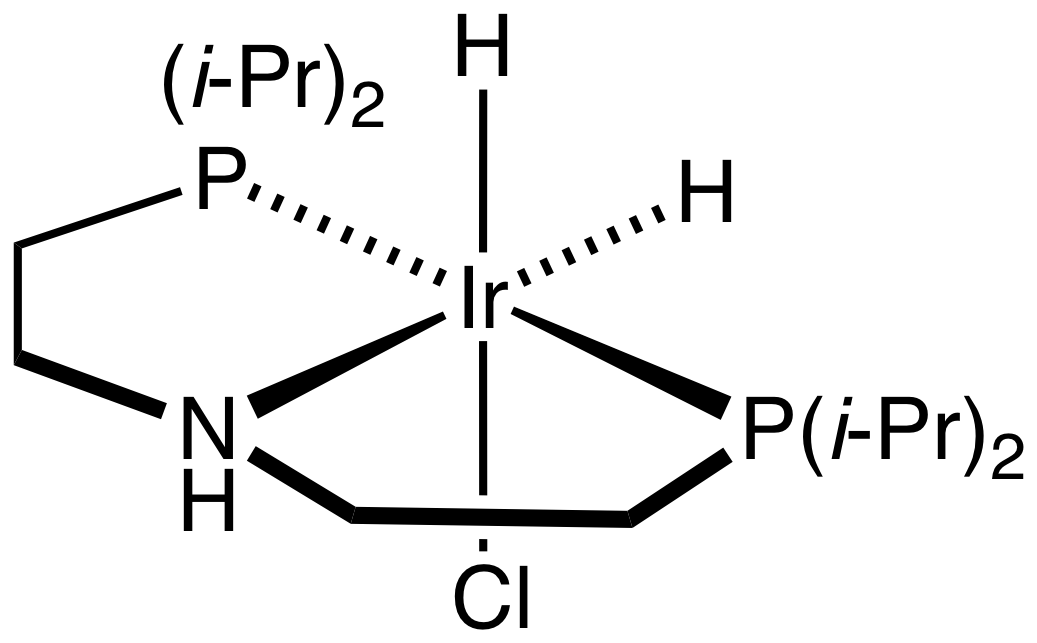
An iridium MACHO catalyst.

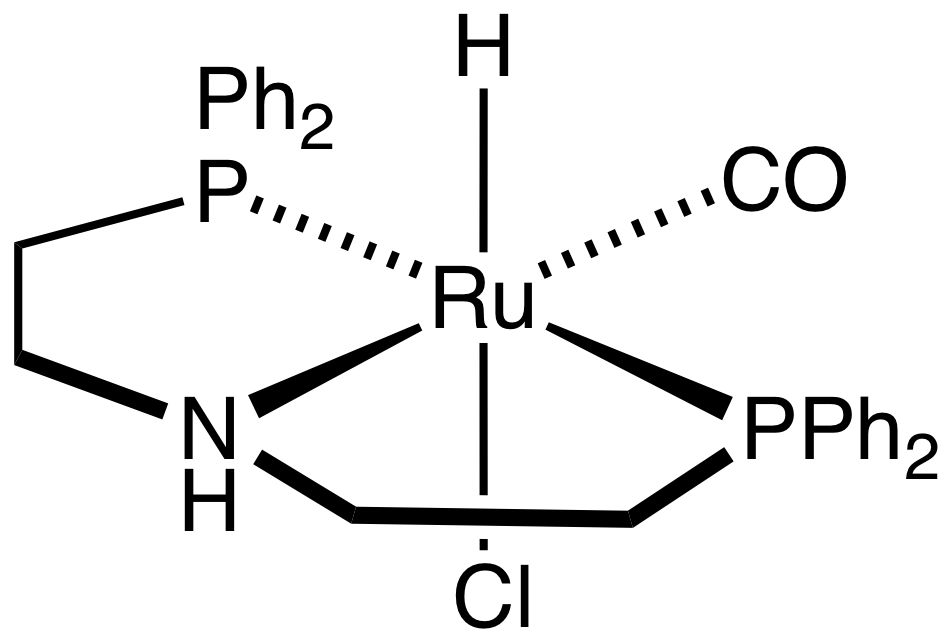
A ruthenium MACHO catalyst.

In homogeneous catalysis, MACHO catalysts are metal complexes containing MACHO ligands, which are of the type HN(CH_{2}CH_{2}PR_{2})_{2}, where R is typically phenyl or isopropyl. Complexes with ruthenium(II) and iridium(III) have received much attention for their ability to hydrogenate polar bonds such as those in esters and even carbon dioxide. The catalysts appear to operate via intermediates where the amine proton and the hydride ligand both interact with the substrate. The Ru-MACHO catalyst have been commercialized for the synthesis of 1,2-propanediol from bio-derived methyl lactate.

== See also ==
- 1,5-Diaza-3,7-diphosphacyclooctanes, phosphine amine ligands used in hydrogen evolution
- Noyori asymmetric hydrogenation, another family of amine-phosphine catalysts
- Shvo catalyst, a related bifunctional catalyst for hydrogen transfer
