= Lactic acid O-carboxyanhydride =

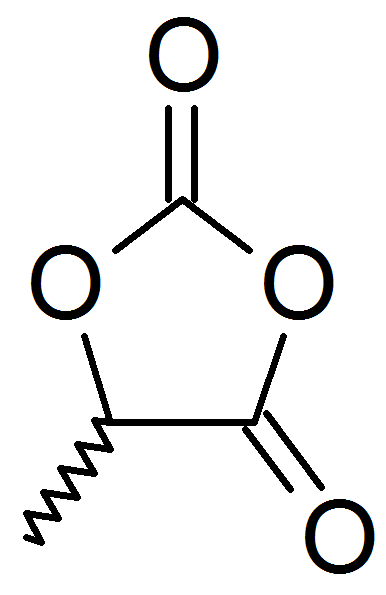

Names
- IUPAC name 5-Methyl-1,3-dioxolane-2,4-dione

Identifiers
CAS Number	17578-13-1
3D model (JSmol)	Interactive image
ChemSpider	11239219
ECHA InfoCard	100.116.276
EC Number	605-761-8
PubChem CID	22227598
UNII	G27CEX5CF8
CompTox Dashboard (EPA)	DTXSID401030440
- InChI: InChI=1S/C4H4O4/c1-2-3(5)8-4(6)7-2/h2H,1H3 Key: JLXQJNCZXSYXAK-UHFFFAOYSA-N; InChI=1/C4H4O4/c1-2-3(5)8-4(6)7-2/h2H,1H3 Key: JLXQJNCZXSYXAK-UHFFFAOYAX
- SMILES: O=C1OC(=O)OC1C

Properties
Chemical formula	C_{4}H_{4}O_{4}
Molar mass	116.072 g·mol^{−1}
Melting point	28 °C (82 °F; 301 K)
- Except where otherwise noted, data are given for materials in their standard state (at 25 °C [77 °F], 100 kPa). Infobox references

Lactic acid O-carboxyanhydride (lac-OCA) is an organic compound. It is used as a monomer equivalent to lactic acid or lactide in the preparation of poly(lactic acid). When this monomer undergoes ring-opening polymerization, one equivalent of carbon dioxide gas is released for every lactic acid unit incorporated into the polymer:

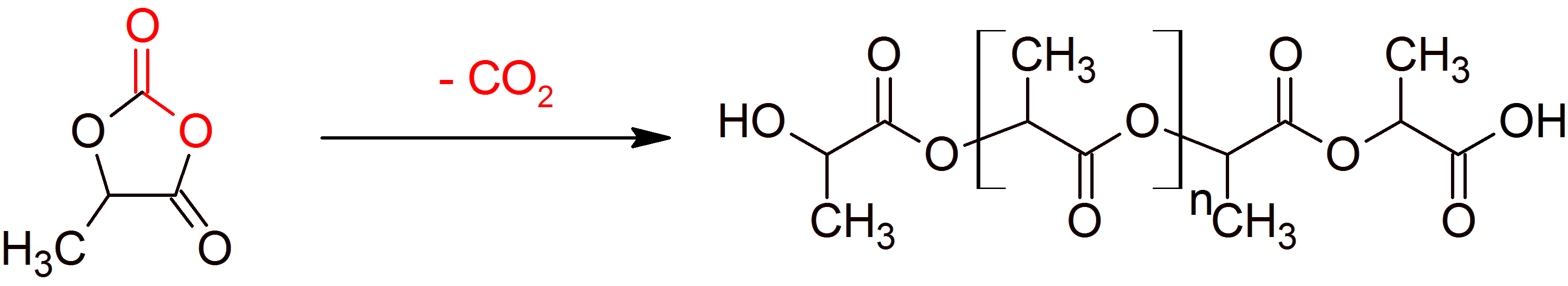

This compound is prepared by treatment of lactic acid or its salts with phosgene or one of its equivalents, e.g. diphosgene.
