= Polilactofate =

Copolymer

Polilactofate (PLF) is a copolymer of PDLL (poly(d,l-lactide)) and a phosphoester. It may have applications in pharmaceutical delivery.
