= Patternmaking =

The term patternmaking may refer to:

- The making of patterns for casting
- The making of patterns for sewing
