= Pattern maker =

Pattern maker or patternmaker may refer to:

- Someone who makes patterns for casting
- Patternmaker (clothing)
- Patternmaker (engineering)
