= Methyl lactate =

Methyl DL-Lactate
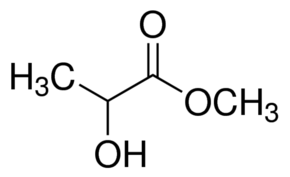
- Methyl L-lactate

Names
- IUPAC name Methyl 2-hydroxypropanoate
- Other names 2-Hydroxy- Methyl Ester Propanoic Acid; 2-Hydroxypropanoic Acid, Methyl Ester; Lactic Acid, Methyl Ester

Identifiers
CAS Number	547-64-8 (racemate)(L-isomer); 27871-49-4 (L-isomer); 17392-83-5 (D-isomer)
3D model (JSmol)	Interactive image
ChemSpider	13839235
ECHA InfoCard	100.008.119
PubChem CID	11040
RTECS number	OD5670000
UNII	H10S91526X (racemate; 0379G9C44S (L-isomer); 45MZ1T3TBV (D-isomer)
CompTox Dashboard (EPA)	DTXSID0027197
- InChI: InChI=1S/C4H8O3/c1-3(5)4(6)7-2/h3,5H,1-2H3 Key: LPEKGGXMPWTOCB-UHFFFAOYSA-N
- SMILES: CC(C(=O)OC)O

Properties
Chemical formula	C_{4}H_{8}O_{3}
Molar mass	104.105 g·mol^{−1}
Appearance	colourless clear liquid
Density	1.093 g/cm^{3}
Melting point	−66 °C (−87 °F; 207 K)
Boiling point	144 to 145 °C (291 to 293 °F; 417 to 418 K)
Solubility in water	Miscible
Solubility in ethanol and most alcohols	Miscible

Hazards
- Occupational safety and health (OHS/OSH)
Main hazards	Irritant (Xi)
- GHS labelling
Pictograms	(GHS02: Flammable) (GHS07: Exclamation mark)
Signal word	Warning
Hazard statements	H226, H319, H335
Precautionary statements	P210, P305+P351+P338
NFPA 704 (fire diamond)	1 2 0
Flash point	49 °C (120 °F; 322 K)
Safety data sheet (SDS)	MSDS

Related compounds
Related compounds	Lactic acid
- Except where otherwise noted, data are given for materials in their standard state (at 25 °C [77 °F], 100 kPa). verify (what is ?) Infobox references

Methyl lactate, also known as lactic acid methyl ester, is the organic compound with the formula CH_{3}CH(OH)CO_{2}CH_{3}. It is the methyl ester of lactic acid. A colorless liquid, it is the simplest chiral ester. Being naturally derived, it is readily available as a single enantiomer.

== Uses ==
It is a solvent for nitrocellulose, cellulose acetate, cellulose acetobutyrate and cellulose acetopropionate. It is used in the manufacture of lacquers and dopes where it contributes high tolerance for diluents, good flaw and blush resistance.

The synthesis of 1,2-propanediol from methyl lactate has been commercialized using a MACHO catalyst.

== See also ==
- Ethyl lactate, a more commonly used ester of lactic acid
