= Lost-foam casting =

Type of evaporative-pattern casting process

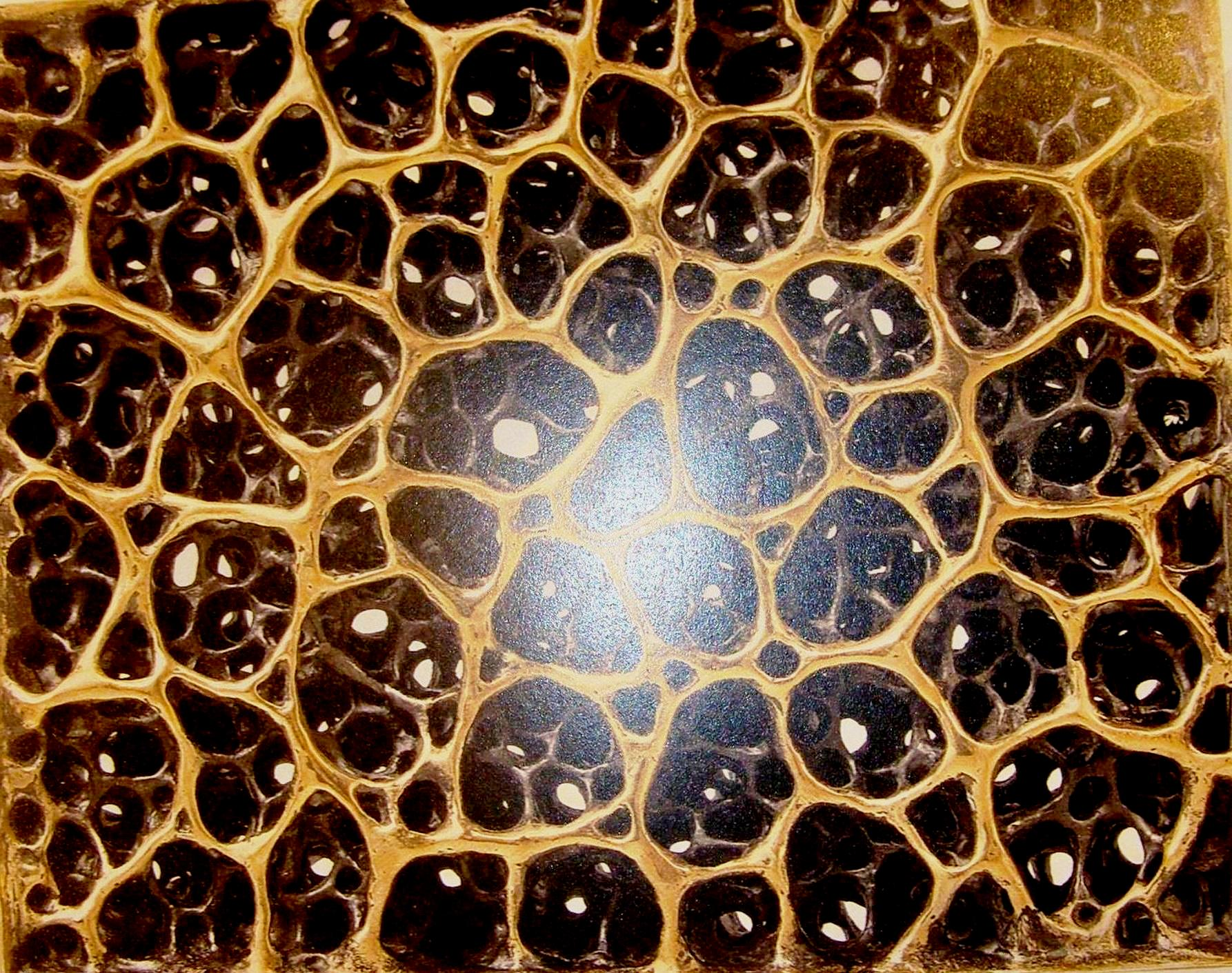
Fragment of artistic bronze casting cell

Lost-foam casting (LFC) is a type of evaporative-pattern casting process that is similar to investment casting except foam is used for the pattern instead of wax. This process takes advantage of the low boiling point of polymer foams to simplify the investment casting process by removing the need to melt the wax out of the mold.

== Process ==
First, a pattern is made from polystyrene foam, which can be done by many different ways. For small volume runs the pattern can be hand cut or machined from a solid block of foam, or a sheet of foam core board. If the geometry is simple enough it can even be cut using a hot-wire foam cutter. If the volume is large, then the pattern can be mass-produced by a process similar to injection molding. Pre-expanded beads of polystyrene are injected into a preheated aluminum mold at low pressure. Steam is then applied to the polystyrene which causes it to expand more to fill the die. The final pattern is approximately 97.5% air and 2.5% polystyrene. Pre-made pouring basins, runners, and risers can be hot glued to the pattern to finish it.

The foam pattern does not need to be coated with investment if high detail is not needed; simply putting the foam pattern in a box, filling with sand and vibrating will do. However, when detail is needed, the foam cluster is coated with ceramic investment, also known as the refractory coating, via dipping, brushing, spraying or flow coating. After the coating dries, the cluster is placed into a flask and backed up with un-bonded sand which is compacted using a vibration table. The refractory coating captures all of the detail in the foam model and creates a barrier between the smooth foam surface and the coarse sand surface. Secondly it controls permeability, which allows the gas created by vaporizing the foam pattern to escape through the coating and into the sand. Controlling permeability is a crucial step to avoid sand erosion. Finally, it forms a barrier so that molten metal does not penetrate or cause sand erosion during pouring. Once the sand is compacted, the mold is ready to be poured. Automatic pouring is commonly used in LFC, as the pouring process is significantly more critical than in conventional foundry practice.

There is no bake-out phase, as for lost-wax. The melt is poured directly into the foam-filled mold, burning out the foam as it pours. As the foam is of low density, the waste gas produced by this is relatively small and can escape through mold permeability, as for the usual outgassing control.

== Details ==
Commonly cast metals include cast irons, aluminium alloys, steels, and nickel alloys; less frequently stainless steels and copper alloys are also cast. The size range is from 0.5 kg (1.1 lb) to several tonnes (tons). The minimum wall thickness is 2.5 mm (0.098 in) and there is no upper limit. Typical surface finishes are from 2.5 to 25 μm (100 to 1000 μin) RMS. Typical linear tolerances are ±0.005 mm/mm (0.005 in/in).

== Advantages and disadvantages ==
This casting process is advantageous for very complex castings that would regularly require cores. It is also dimensionally accurate, maintains an excellent surface finish, requires no draft, and has no parting lines so no flash is formed. The un-bonded sand of lost foam casting can be much simpler to maintain than green sand and resin bonded sand systems. Lost foam is generally more economical than investment casting because it involves fewer steps. Risers are not usually required due to the nature of the process; because the molten metal vaporizes the foam the first metal into the mold cools more quickly than the rest, which results in natural directional solidification. Foam is easy to manipulate, carve and glue, due to its unique properties. The flexibility of LFC often allows for consolidating the parts into one integral component; other forming processes would require the production of one or more parts to be assembled.

The two main disadvantages are that pattern costs can be high for low volume applications and the patterns are easily damaged or distorted due to their low strength. If a die is used to create the patterns there is a large initial cost.

== History ==
Lost-foam casting was invented in the early fifties by Canadian sculptor Armand Vaillancourt. Public recognition of the benefits of LFC was made by General Motors in the mid 1980s when it announced its new car line, Saturn, would utilize LFC for production of all engine blocks, cylinder heads, crankshafts, differential carriers, and transmission cases.

== See also ==
- Full-mold casting

== Bibliography ==
- Degarmo, E. Paul; Black, J T.; Kohser, Ronald A. (2003), Materials and Processes in Manufacturing (9th ed.), Wiley, ISBN 0-471-65653-4.
- Kalpakjian, Serope; Schmid, Steven (2006), Manufacturing Engineering and Technology (5th ed.), Pearson, ISBN 0-13-148965-8.
