= Lactide =

Names
- Preferred IUPAC name 3,6-Dimethyl-1,4-dioxan-2,5-dione
- Other names Dilactid

Identifiers
CAS Number	4511-42-6 [(S,S)-Lactide]; 25038-75-9 [(R,R)-Lactide]; 13076-19-2 [(R,S)-Lactide = meso-Lactide]; 26680-10-4 [mixture of three isomers]; 95-96-5 [mixture of three isomers]
3D model (JSmol)	Interactive image
ChemSpider	7002
ECHA InfoCard	100.002.245
EC Number	202-468-3
PubChem CID	7272
UNII	IJ13TO4NO1 [(S,S)-Lactide]; 9J7G894K2M [mixture of three isomers]; 7EH08MWO6M [mixture of three isomers]
CompTox Dashboard (EPA)	DTXSID7041253
- InChI: InChI=1S/C6H8O4/c1-3-5(7)10-4(2)6(8)9-3/h3-4H,1-2H3 Key: JJTUDXZGHPGLLC-UHFFFAOYSA-N
- SMILES: CC1C(=O)OC(C(=O)O1)C

Properties
Chemical formula	C_{6}H_{8}O_{4}
Molar mass	144.126 g·mol^{−1}
Melting point	95 to 97 °C (203 to 207 °F; 368 to 370 K) [(S,S)-Lactide and (R,R)-Lactide]
Solubility in water	Hydrolyses to lactic acid
Solubility	soluble in chloroform, methanol slightly soluble in benzene

Hazards
- GHS labelling
Pictograms	(GHS07: Exclamation mark)
Signal word	Warning
Hazard statements	H319
Precautionary statements	P264, P280, P305+P351+P338, P337+P313
- Except where otherwise noted, data are given for materials in their standard state (at 25 °C [77 °F], 100 kPa). verify (what is ?) Infobox references

Lactide is the lactone cyclic ester derived by multiple esterification between two (usually) or more molecules from lactic acid (2-hydroxypropionic acid) or other hydroxy carboxylic acid. They are designated as dilactides, trilactides, etc., according to the number of hydroxy acid residues. All lactides are colorless or white solids. The dilactide derived from lactic acid has the formula [CH(CH_{3})CO_{2}]_{2}. This lactide has attracted interest because it is derived from abundant renewable resources and is the precursor to a biodegradable plastic.

== Stereoisomers ==
The dilactide derived from lactic acid can exist in three different stereoisomeric forms. This complexity arises because lactic acid is chiral. These enantiomers do not racemize readily.

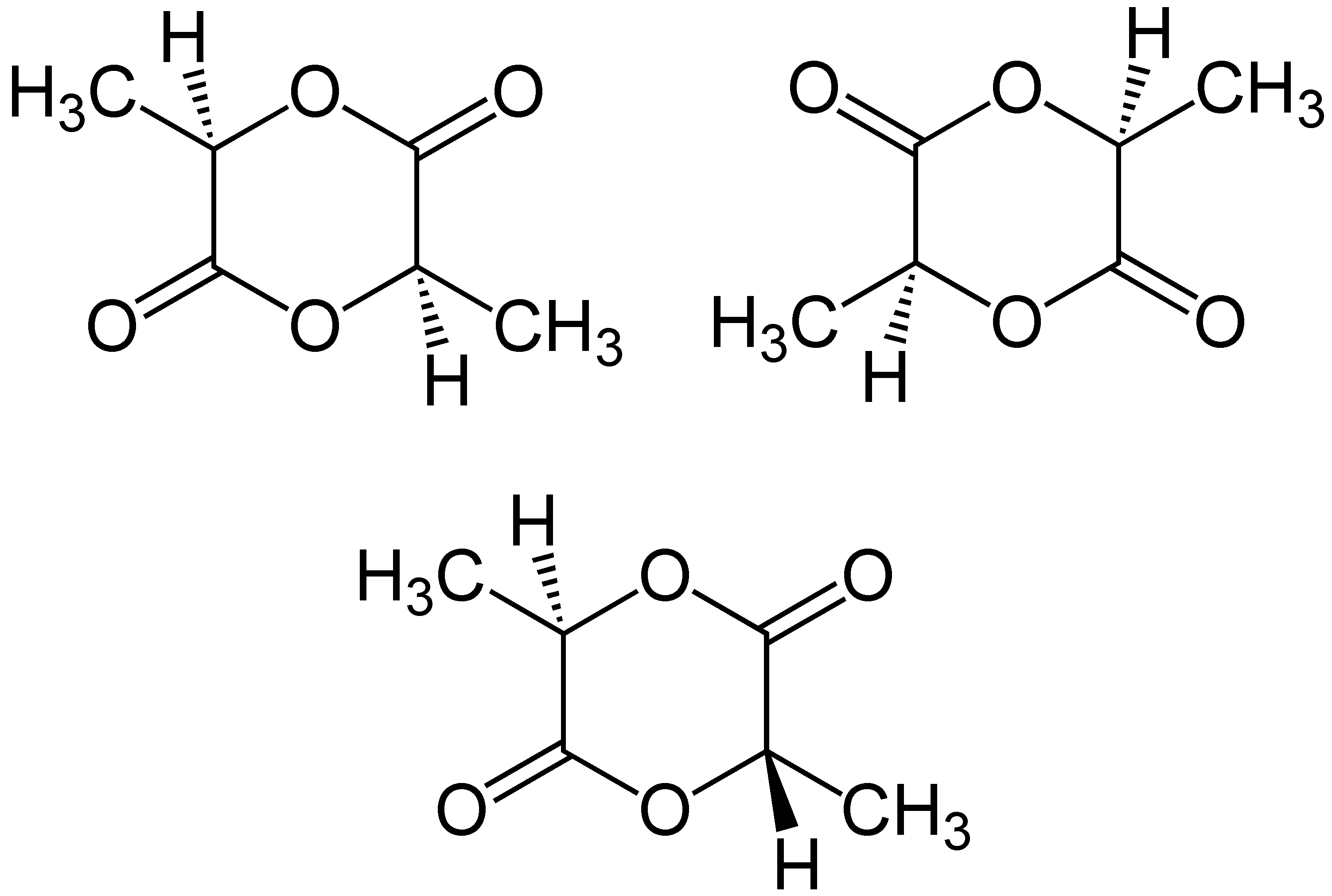
(R,R)-Lactide (left above), (S,S)-lactide (right above) and meso-lactide (below)

All three stereoisomers undergo epimerisation in the presence of organic and inorganic bases in solution.

== Polymerization ==
Lactide can be polymerized to polylactic acid (polylactide). Depending on the catalyst, syndiotactic or a heterotactic polymers can result. The resulting materials, polylactic acid, have many attractive properties.
