= Metal swarf =

Filing debris or waste resulting from metal manufacturing processes

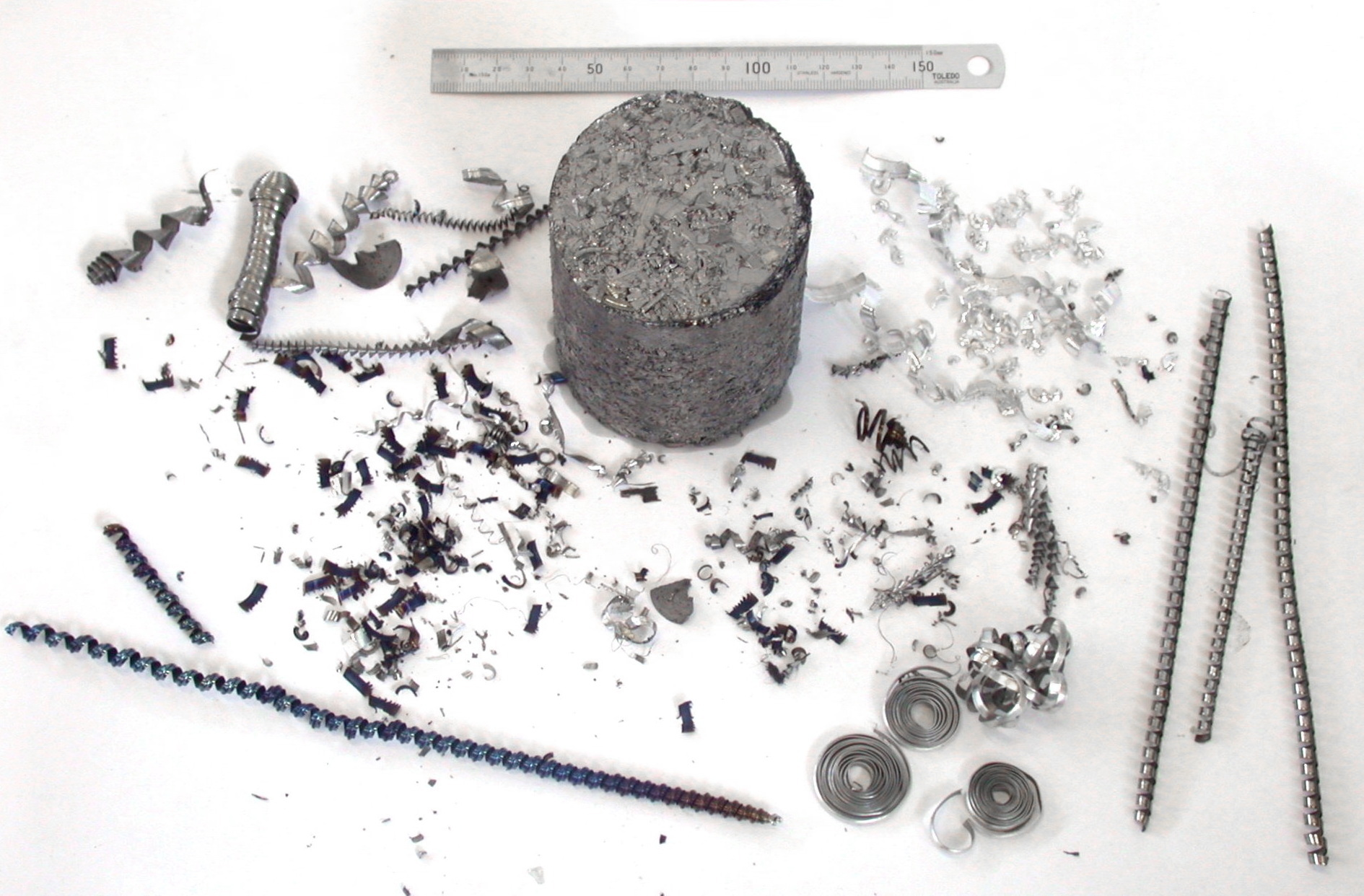
Various examples of metal swarf, including a block of compressed swarf. Broken up chips are preferred over stringy drill chips.

Metal swarf, also known as chips or by other process-specific names (such as turnings, filings, or shavings), are pieces of metal that are the debris or waste resulting from machining or similar subtractive (material-removing) manufacturing processes. Metal swarf can be small particles (such as the gritty swarf from grinding metal) or long, stringy tendrils (such as the springy chips from turning tough metals).

== Cutting hazards and safety precautions ==
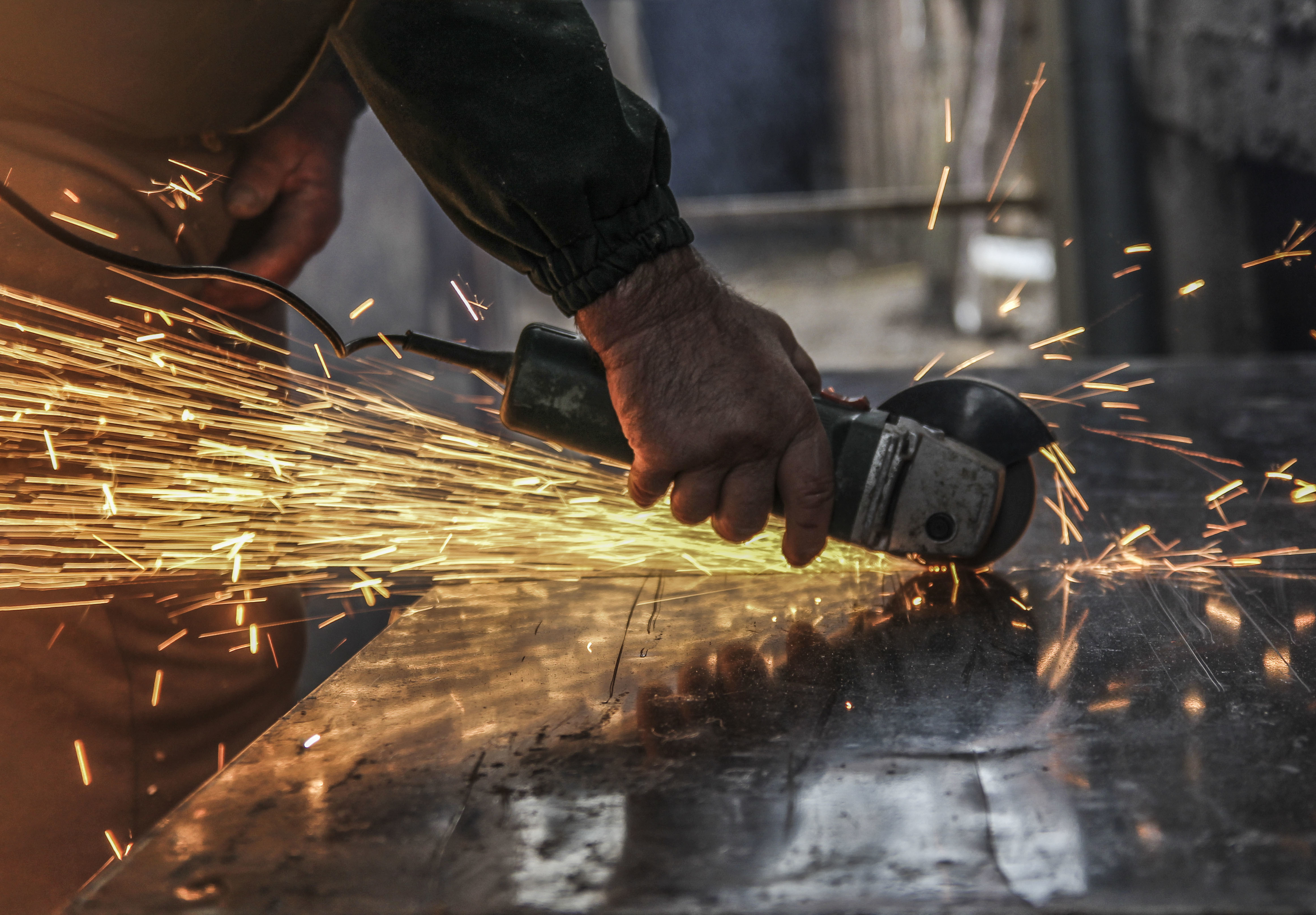
Metal grinding produces grinding swarf.

=== Cuts, splinters, punctures, airborne chips ===
Chips can be extremely sharp, and this creates a safety problem, as they can cause serious injuries if not handled correctly. Depending on the composition of the material, it can persist in the environment for a long time before degrading. This, combined with the small size of some chips (e.g. those of brass or bronze), allows them to disperse widely by piggy-backing on soft materials and also to penetrate the skin as deep splinters.

It is standard training for machinists, and usually a standing workplace rule, to avoid handling swarf with bare hands. Similarly, it is also standard training for machinists, and usually a standing workplace rule, to minimize or entirely avoid handling swarf by blowing chips away with compressed air, but this practice can potentially damage the machine by causing chips to get jammed in and then embedded into the moving surfaces leading to degradation of the machine's precision. Alternatives to blowing chips away include vacuuming them away with an industrial vacuum (shop vacuum); gently washing them away with a coolant hose discharging at typical garden-hose pressures; or preventing their generation in the first place (for example, forming threads instead of cutting them). Some machine tool manuals proscribe these practices both for safety and for the preservation of way wipers and bearing seals.

It is not uncommon for chips flying off the cutter to be ejected with great force and to fly several metres. These flying chips present a hazard that is deflected with safety glasses, face shields, and other personal protective equipment, as well as the sheet-metal enclosures (and polycarbonate windows) that surround most commercial computer numerical control (CNC) machine tools.

=== Flammability ===
Due to its high surface area, swarf composed of some reactive metals can be highly flammable. Caution should be exercised to avoid ignition sources when handling or storing swarf in loose form, especially swarf of pure magnesium, magnesium alloy, pure titanium, titanium alloy, iron, and non-stainless steel.

Swarf stored in piles or bins may also spontaneously combust, especially if the swarf is coated with cutting oil.

To extinguish swarf fires, a special fire extinguisher is needed, designed for fighting Class D (metal) fires.

=== Toxicity ===
Some common engineering materials such as beryllium are hazardous when finely divided and appropriate measures should be taken to prevent exposure.

== Chip breaking ==
Optimum cutting efficiencies often generate long spring-like swarf. This is hard to deal with as it is bulky and can potentially damage the surface finish of the workpiece being cut. Clean-up and disposal of this continuous-cutting swarf is made simpler by using a cutting tool with a chip-breaker. This results in denser, more manageable waste. Chip breaking tool geometry is generally designed to break the chip by having it curl back onto itself. This action produces many small spiral shaped rings instead of one long helical chip. "Number Nine" shaped chips or short swarf in general are preferred also because it helps prevent entangling the rotating machine.

== Machine cleaning and chip handling ==
Disposing of swarf is a tedious but necessary task. For ease of transport and handling, swarf may be compressed into bricks, which greatly reduces associated problems with storing and cost; it also improves material handling for all concerned with its reclamation and recycling.

== Recycling ==
Metal swarf can usually be recycled, and this is the preferred method of disposal due to the environmental concerns regarding potential contamination with cutting fluid or tramp oil. The ideal way to remove these liquids is by the use of a centrifuge which will separate the fluids from the metal, allowing both to be reclaimed and prepared for further treatment. Small bundles of stainless steel or bronze swarf are sold as excellent scourers for dishwashing or cleaning encrustations of dirt. Recycling chips rather than putting them in the garbage stream (heading to landfilling or incineration) has various advantages:

- Environmental
  - As mentioned above, keep cutting fluid out of the waste stream
  - Reduce the amount of ore mining and metal refining that must be done to meet the annual global demand for metal stocks. For example, it takes at least 4 times the energy per unit of production to produce aluminum billet from mined ore—plus the environmental impact of the mining itself—as it does to produce it from recycled scrap metal stocks (such as chips and bar drops).
- Financial
  - There is almost always some money to be made from the stream of recycled chips, whether by the scrap processor, the machine shop, or often both. The scrap value (melt value) of the metal is a net gain beyond any costs of handling and transporting the chips.

=== Requirements ===
Machine shops are typically required by the scrap collector to:

- segregate metal types (e.g., aluminum chips in separate barrels from steel chips)
  - it is usually not required to segregate particular alloys (e.g., to keep 2024 aluminum separate from 6061)
- segregate solid chunks (such as bar end drops and scrapped-out parts) from chips (which are finer and are processed on different material handling equipment).
- drain and/or centrifuge all cutting fluid and way oil out of the chips. (within reason)
