= Diglycolic anhydride =

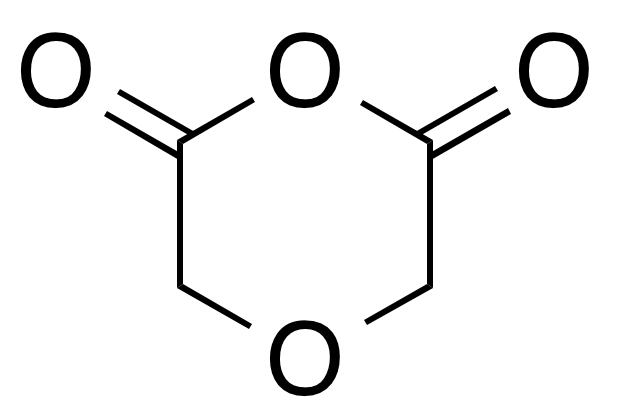

Names
- IUPAC name 1,4-dioxane-2,6-dione
- Other names: Diglycolic acid anhydride; Oxydiacetic anhydride

Identifiers
CAS Number	4480-83-5
3D model (JSmol)	Interactive image
ChemSpider	70607
ECHA InfoCard	100.022.511
EC Number	224-761-5
PubChem CID	78232
UNII	RKE2JJ6VPJ
CompTox Dashboard (EPA)	DTXSID90196305
- InChI: InChI=1S/C4H4O4/c5-3-1-7-2-4(6)8-3/h1-2H2 Key: PIYNUZCGMLCXKJ-UHFFFAOYSA-N
- SMILES: O=C1OC(=O)COC1

Properties
Chemical formula	C_{4}H_{4}O_{4}
Molar mass	116.072 g·mol^{−1}
Appearance	white crystals
Melting point	92 °C
Boiling point	240 °C

Hazards
- GHS labelling
Pictograms	(GHS07: Exclamation mark)
Signal word	Warning
Hazard statements	H315, H319, H335
Precautionary statements	P261, P264, P264+P265, P271, P280, P302+P352, P304+P340, P305+P351+P338, P319, P321, P332+P317, P337+P317, P362+P364, P403+P233, P405, P501
- Except where otherwise noted, data are given for materials in their standard state (at 25 °C [77 °F], 100 kPa). Infobox references

Diglycolic anhydride (1,4-dioxane-2,6-dione) is the carboxylic acid anhydride of diglycolic acid. It has been used as a monomer in the synthesis of poly(ester-ether) and poly(amide–ether) polymers. It also can serve as a starting material for production of various bicyclic heterocyclic structures.
