= Evaporative-pattern casting =

Evaporative-pattern casting is a type of casting process that uses a pattern made from a material that will evaporate when the molten metal is poured into the molding cavity. The most common evaporative-pattern material used is polystyrene foam.

The two major evaporative-pattern casting processes are:

- Lost-foam casting
- Full-mold casting

The main difference is that lost-foam casting uses an unbonded sand and full-mold casting uses a bonded sand (or green sand). Because this difference is quite small there is much overlap in the terminology. Non-proprietary terms that have been used to describe these processes include: cavityless casting, evaporative foam casting, foam vaporization casting, lost pattern casting, the castral process, and expanded polystyrene molding. Proprietary terms included Styro-cast, Foam Cast, Replicast, Policast. and Lost Foam Sintered Shell (LFSS)

== History ==
The first patent for an evaporative-pattern casting process was filed in April 1956, by Harold F. Shroyer. He patented the use of foam patterns embedded in traditional green sand for metal casting. In his patent, a pattern was machined from a block of expanded polystyrene (EPS), and supported by bonded sand during pouring. This process is now known as the full mold process.

In 1964, M.C. Flemmings used unbonded sand for the process. The first North American foundry to use evaporative-pattern casting was the Robinson Foundry at Alexander City, Alabama. General Motors' first product using these processes was the 4.3 L, V-6 diesel cylinder head, which were made in 1981 at Massena, New York.

A study found in 1997 that evaporative-pattern casting processes accounted for approximately 140,000 tons of aluminium casting in the United States. The same survey forecast that evaporative-pattern casting processes would account for 29% of the aluminium, and 14% of the ferrous casting markets by 2010.
