= Plastarch material =

Plastarch Material (PSM) is a biodegradable, thermoplastic resin. It is composed of starch combined with several other biodegradable materials. The starch is modified in order to obtain heat-resistant properties, making PSM one of the few bioplastics capable of withstanding high temperatures. PSM began to be commercially available in 2005.

PSM is stable in the atmosphere, but biodegradable in compost, wet soil, fresh water, seawater, and activated sludge where microorganisms exist. It has a softening temperature of 257 °F (125 °C) and a melting temperature of 313 °F (156 °C).

It is also hygroscopic. The material has to be dried in a material dryer at 150 °F (66 °C) for five hours or 180 °F (82 °C) for three hours. For injection molding and extrusion, the barrel temperatures should be at 340° +/- 10 °F (171 °C) with the nozzle/die at 360 °F (182 °C).

Due to how similar PSM is to other plastics (such as polypropylene and CPET), PSM can run on many existing thermoforming and injection molding lines. PSM is currently used for a wide variety of applications in the plastic market, such as food packaging and utensils, personal care items, plastic bags, temporary construction tubing, industrial foam packaging, industrial and agricultural film, window insulation, construction stakes, and horticulture planters.

Since PSM is derived from a renewable resource (corn starch), it has become an attractive alternative to petrochemical-derived products. Unlike plastic, PSM can also be disposed of through incineration, resulting in non-toxic smoke and a white residue which can be used as fertilizer. However, concerns have been expressed about the impact of such technologies on food prices.

== Biodegradability concerns ==
Some PSM products - such as cutlery - contain a mix of PSM and plastics. These plastics prevent the PSM from degrading, making the entire product non-biodegradable.
