= Investment casting =

Industrial process based on lost-wax casting

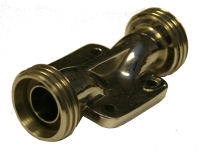
Inlet-outlet cover of a valve for a nuclear power station produced using investment casting

Investment casting is an industrial process based on lost-wax casting, one of the oldest known metal-forming techniques. The term "lost-wax casting" can also refer to modern investment casting processes.

Investment casting has been used in various forms for the last 5,000 years. In its earliest forms, beeswax was used to form patterns necessary for the casting process. Today, more advanced waxes, refractory materials and specialist alloys are typically used for making patterns. Investment casting is valued for its ability to produce components with accuracy, repeatability, versatility and integrity in a variety of metals and high-performance alloys.

The fragile wax patterns must withstand forces encountered during the mould making. Much of the wax used in investment casting can be reclaimed and reused. Lost-foam casting is a modern form of investment casting that eliminates certain steps in the process.

Investment casting is so named because the process invests (surrounds) the pattern with refractory material to make a mould, and a molten substance is cast into the mold. Materials that can be cast include stainless steel alloys, brass, aluminium, carbon steel and glass. The cavity inside the refractory mould is a slightly oversized but otherwise exact duplicate of the desired part. Due to the hardness of refractory materials used, investment casting can produce products with exceptional surface qualities, which can reduce the need for secondary machine processes.

Water glass and silica sol investment casting are the two primary investment casting methods currently in use. The main differences are the surface roughness and cost of casting. Water glass method dewaxes into the high-temperature water, and the ceramic mould is made of water glass quartz sand. Silica sol method dewaxes into the flash fire, and silica sol zircon sand makes the ceramic mould. Silica sol method costs more but has the better surface than the water glass method.

The process can be used for both small castings of a few ounces and large castings weighing several hundred pounds. However, it is most suitable for small parts at large volumes. It can be more expensive than die casting or sand casting, but per-unit costs decrease with large volumes. Investment casting can produce complicated shapes that would be difficult or impossible with other casting methods. It can also produce products with exceptional surface qualities and low tolerances with minimal surface finishing or machining required.

The technical and trade organization for the global investment casting industry is the Investment Casting Institute and the trade magazine for the industry is INCAST Magazine.

== Process ==
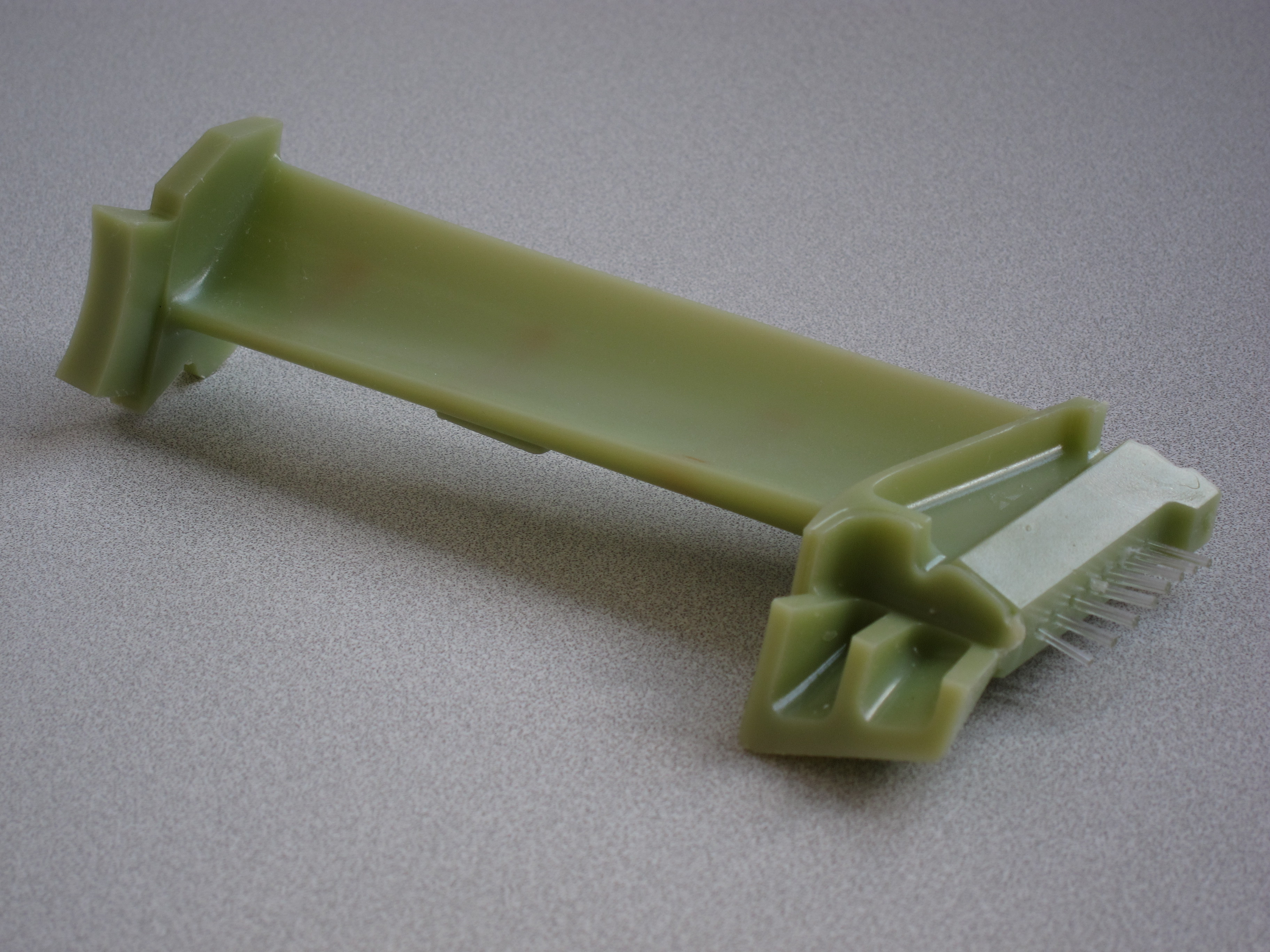
A wax pattern used to create a jet engine turbine blade

Castings can be made from an original wax model (the direct method) or from wax replicas of an original pattern that need not be made from wax (the indirect method). The following steps describe the indirect process, which can take two to seven days to complete.

1. Produce a master pattern: An artist or mould-maker creates an original pattern from wax, clay, wood, plastic, or another material. In recent years the production of patterns using 3D printing of models produced by computer-aided design software has become popular using mainly resin based Stereolithography (SLA) or DLP 3D printers for high resolution patterns or standard PLA filament when high levels of accuracy are not required. If using a 3D Printed pattern proceed directly to step 5.
2. Create a mould: A mould, known as the master die, is made to fit the master pattern. If the master pattern was made from steel, the master die can be cast directly from the pattern using metal with a lower melting point. Rubber moulds can also be cast directly from the master pattern. Alternatively, a master die can be machined independently—without creating a master pattern.
3. Produce wax patterns: Although called wax patterns, pattern materials may also include plastic and frozen mercury. Wax patterns are most commonly produced by injecting molten wax into a metal die. For some applications, hollow patterns may instead be made by pouring wax into a mould and rotating or "slushing" it to leave a uniform coating on the mould walls, while solid patterns are produced by completely filling the mould with wax and allowing it to solidify.
  If a core is required, there are two options: soluble wax or ceramic. Soluble wax cores are designed to melt out of the investment coating with the rest of the wax pattern; ceramic cores are removed after the product has hardened.
4. Assemble wax patterns: Multiple wax patterns can be created and assembled into one large pattern to be cast in one batch pour. In this situation, patterns are attached to a wax sprue to create a pattern cluster, or tree. To attach patterns, a heating tool is used to slightly melt designated wax surfaces, which are then pressed against each other and left to cool and harden. As many as several hundred patterns can be assembled into a tree. Wax patterns can also be chased, which means parting lines or flashings are rubbed out using the heated metal tool. Finally, patterns are dressed (by removing imperfections) to look like finished pieces.
5. Apply investment materials: The ceramic mould, known as the investment, is produced by repeating a series of steps—coating, stuccoing, and hardening—until a desired thickness is achieved.
  1. Coating involves dipping a pattern cluster into a slurry of fine refractory material and then draining to create a uniform surface coating. Fine materials are used in this first step, also called a prime coat, to preserve fine details from the mould.
  2. Stuccoing applies coarse ceramic particles by dipping patterns into a fluidised bed, placing it in a rainfall-sander, or by applying materials by hand.
  3. Hardening allows coatings to cure. These steps are repeated until the investment reaches its required thickness—usually 5 to 15 mm (0.2 to 0.6 in). Investment moulds are left to dry completely, which can take 16 to 48 hours. Drying can be accelerated by applying a vacuum or minimizing environmental humidity. Investment moulds can also be created by placing the pattern clusters into a flask and then pouring liquid investment material from above. The flask is then vibrated to allow entrapped air to escape and help the investment material fill any small voids.
  4. Materials: common refractory materials used to create the investments are: silica, zircon, various aluminium silicates, and alumina. Silica is usually used in the fused silica form, but sometimes quartz is used because it is less expensive. Aluminium silicates are a mixture of alumina and silica, where commonly used mixtures have an alumina content from 42 to 72%; at 72% alumina the compound is known as mullite. During the primary coat(s), zircon-based refractories are commonly used, because zirconium is less likely to react with the molten metal. Prior to silica, a mixture of plaster and ground up old moulds (chamotte) was used. The binders used to hold the refractory material in place include: ethyl silicate (alcohol-based and chemically set), colloidal silica (water-based, also known as silica sol, set by drying), sodium silicate, and a hybrid of these controlled for pH and viscosity.
6. Dewax: Once ceramic moulds have fully cured, they are turned upside-down and placed in a furnace or autoclave to melt out and/or vaporize the wax. Specialist investment casting kilns designed for this purpose offer precise temperature control and uniform heat distribution, to ensure clean wax burnout without damaging the ceramic shell. Most shell failures occur at this point because the waxes used have a thermal expansion coefficient that is much greater than the investment material surrounding it—as the wax is heated it expands and introduces stress. To minimize these stresses the wax is heated as rapidly as possible so that outer wax surfaces can melt and drain quickly, making space for the rest of the wax to expand. In certain situations, holes may be drilled into the mould before heating to help reduce these stresses. Any wax that runs out of the mould is usually recovered and reused.
7. Burnout preheating: The mould is then subjected to a burnout, which heats the mould to between 870 °C and 1095 °C to remove any moisture and residual wax, and to sinter the mould. Sometimes this heating is also used to preheat the mould before pouring, but other times the mould is allowed to cool so that it can be tested. Preheating allows the metal to stay liquid longer so that it can better fill all mould details and increase dimensional accuracy. If the mould is left to cool, any cracks found can be repaired with ceramic slurry or special cements.
8. Pouring: The investment mould is then placed open-side up into a tub filled with sand. The metal may be gravity poured or forced by applying positive air pressure or other forces. Vacuum casting, tilt casting, pressure assisted pouring and centrifugal casting are methods that use additional forces and are especially useful when moulds contain thin sections that would be otherwise be difficult to fill.
9. Divesting: The shell is hammered, media blasted, vibrated, waterjeted, or chemically dissolved (sometimes with liquid nitrogen) to release the casting. The sprue is cut off and recycled. The casting may then be cleaned up to remove signs of the casting process, usually by grinding.
10. Finishing: After grinding, the completed casting is then subject to finishing. This usually goes further than grinding, with impurities and negatives being removed via hand tooling and welding. In the case that the part needs additional straightening, this process is usually carried out by hydraulic straightening presses, which bring the product in line with its tolerances.
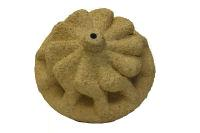
The investment shell for casting a turbocharger rotor

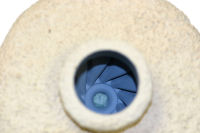
A view of the interior investment shows the smooth surface finish and high level of detail

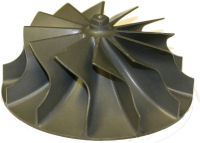
The completed workpiece

== Advantages ==
- Excellent surface finish
- High dimensional accuracy
- Extremely intricate parts are castable
- Almost any metal can be cast
- No flash or parting lines
- Effective utilization of metal
- Fewer environmental hazards from the foundry process

== Disadvantages ==
The main disadvantage is the overall cost, especially for short-run productions. Some of the reasons for the high cost include specialized equipment, costly refractories, and binders, many operations to make a mould, a lot of labor is needed and occasional minute defects occur. However, the cost is still less than producing the same part by machining from bar stock; for example, gun manufacturing has moved to investment casting to lower costs of producing pistols.

Additionally:

- It can be difficult to cast objects requiring cores.
- This process is expensive, is usually limited to small casting, and presents some difficulties where cores are involved.
- Holes cannot be smaller than 1/16 in. (1.6 mm) and should be no deeper than about 1.5 times the diameter.
- Investment castings require longer production cycles compared to other casting processes.
- There are many process factors to affect the quality of the mould and casting, so the quality management system is challenging.

=== Counter-gravity casting ===
The variation on the gravity pouring technique is to fill the mould using a vacuum. A common form of this is called the Hitchiner process after the Hitchiner Manufacturing Company that invented the technique. In this technique, the mould has a downward fill pipe that is lowered into the melt. A vacuum draws the melt into the cavity; when the important parts have solidified, the vacuum is released, and the unused material leaves the mould. The technique can use substantially less material than gravity pouring because the sprue and some gating need not solidify.

This technique is more metal efficient than traditional pouring because less material solidifies in the gating system. Gravity pouring only has a 15 to 50% metal yield compared to 60 to 95% for counter-gravity pouring. There is also less turbulence, so the gating system can be simplified since it does not have to control turbulence. The metal is drawn from below the top of the pool, so the metal is free from dross and slag (which are lower density (lighter) and float to the top of the pool). The pressure differential helps the metal flow into every intricacy of the mould. Finally, lower temperatures can be used, which improves the grain structure.

This process is also used to cast refractory ceramics under the term vacuum casting.

=== Vacuum pressure casting ===
Vacuum pressure casting (VPC), properly referred to as vacuum assist direct pour, uses gas pressure and a vacuum to improve the quality of the casting and minimize porosity. Typically VPC machines consist of an upper and a lower chamber—the upper chamber, or melting chamber, housing the crucible, and the lower casting chamber housing the investment mould. Both chambers are connected via a small hole containing a stopper. A vacuum is pulled in the lower chamber, while pressure is applied in the upper, and then the stopper is removed. This creates the greatest pressure differential to fill the moulds. The most common materials for vacuum casting process are the high nickel-based alloy and super alloys. Turbocharger products are a common applications for this casting process, though it is also regularly used in the manufacture of silver and gold jewellery.

== Details ==
Investment casting is used with almost any castable metal. However, aluminium alloys, copper alloys, and steel are the most common. In industrial use, the size limits are 3 g (0.1 oz) to several hundred kilograms. The cross-sectional limits are 0.6 mm (0.024 in) to 75 mm (3.0 in). Typical tolerances are 0.1 mm for the first 25 mm (0.005 in for the first inch) and 0.02 mm for each additional centimeter (0.002 in for each additional inch). A standard surface finish is 1.3–4 micrometres (50–125 μin) RMS.

== History ==
The history of lost-wax casting dates back thousands of years. Its earliest use was for idols, ornaments and jewellery, using natural beeswax for patterns, clay for the moulds and manually operated bellows for stoking furnaces. Examples have been found across the world, such as in the Harappan Civilisation (2500–2000 BC) idols, Egypt's tombs of Tutankhamun (1333–1324 BC), Mesopotamia, Aztec and Mayan Mexico, and the Benin civilization in Africa where the process produced detailed artwork of copper, bronze and gold. By far, one of the earliest identified uses of the investment casting process was seen in objects found in the 'Cave of Treasure', discovered in Southern Israel. These items were identified as being made around 3700 BC using Carbon-14 dating techniques.

The earliest known text that describes the investment casting process (Schedula Diversarum Artium) was written around 1100 A.D. by Theophilus Presbyter, a monk who described various manufacturing processes, including the recipe for parchment. This book was used by sculptor and goldsmith Benvenuto Cellini (1500–1571), who detailed in his autobiography the investment casting process he used for the Perseus with the Head of Medusa sculpture that stands in the Loggia dei Lanzi in Florence, Italy.

Investment casting came into use as a modern industrial process in the late 19th century, when dentists began using it to make crowns and inlays, as described by Barnabas Frederick Philbrook of Council Bluffs, Iowa in 1897. Its use was accelerated by William H. Taggart of Chicago, whose 1907 paper described his development of a technique. He also formulated a wax pattern compound of excellent properties, developed an investment material, and invented an air-pressure casting machine.

In the 1940s, World War II increased the demand for precision net shape manufacturing and specialized alloys that could not be shaped by traditional methods, or that required too much machining. Industry turned to investment casting. After the war, its use spread to many commercial and industrial applications that used complex metal parts.

== Applications ==
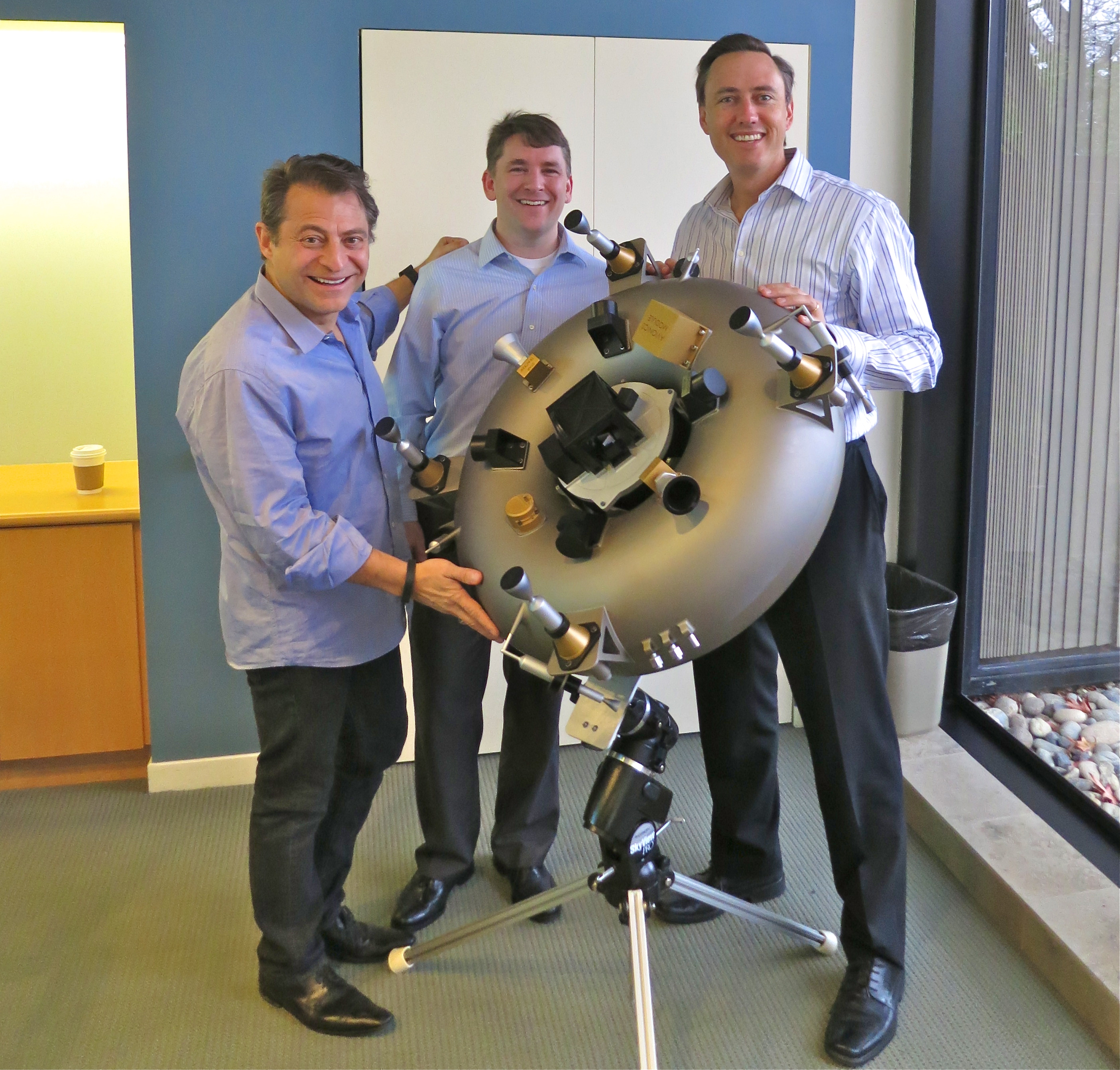
Unveiling the titanium integral space bus satellite by Planetary Resources in February 2014. The sacrificial mould for the investment casting was 3D-printed with integral cable routing and toroidal propellant tank. From left: Peter Diamandis, Chris Lewicki, and Steve Jurvetson.

Investment casting is used in the aerospace and power generation industries to produce turbine blades with complex shapes or cooling systems. Blades produced by investment casting can include single-crystal (SX), directionally solidified (DS), or conventional equiaxed blades.

Investment casting is also widely used by firearms manufacturers to fabricate firearm receivers, triggers, hammers, and other precision parts at low cost.

Karsten Solheim famously revolutionized golf club design through his company PING by incorporating investment casting for the first time for clubheads. Quickly the process became an industry standard to allow weight distribution around the perimeter of the clubhead.

Investment casting is widely used in the pump and valve industry, where components must operate reliably under high pressure, corrosive environments, and extreme temperatures. The oil and gas industry, chemical processing, water treatment, power generation, and marine sectors use investment-cast pump impellers, valve bodies, and other fluid control components. The near-net-shape capability of investment casting reduces machining requirements and produces smooth internal surfaces that improve hydraulic efficiency.

Other industries that use investment-cast parts include military, medical devices, jewelry, automotive, and consumer electronics.

Pahwa MetalTech has taken an innovative approach to manufacturing Non-Sparking Tools via Investment Casting Process to achieve close dimensions and tolerances

With the increased availability of higher-resolution 3D printers, 3D printing has begun to be used to make much larger sacrificial moulds used in investment casting. Planetary Resources has used the technique to print the mould for a new small satellite, which is then dipped in ceramic to form the investment cast for a titanium space bus with integral propellant tank and embedded cable routing.

== See also ==
- Full-mold casting
- Lost-foam casting
