= Wangzhihe =

Chinese condiment company with long history

- Native name: 王致和
- Romanized name: Wáng Zhì Hé
- Industry: Condiments
- Founded: 1669
- Founder: Wang Zhihe
- Headquarters: Beijing, China

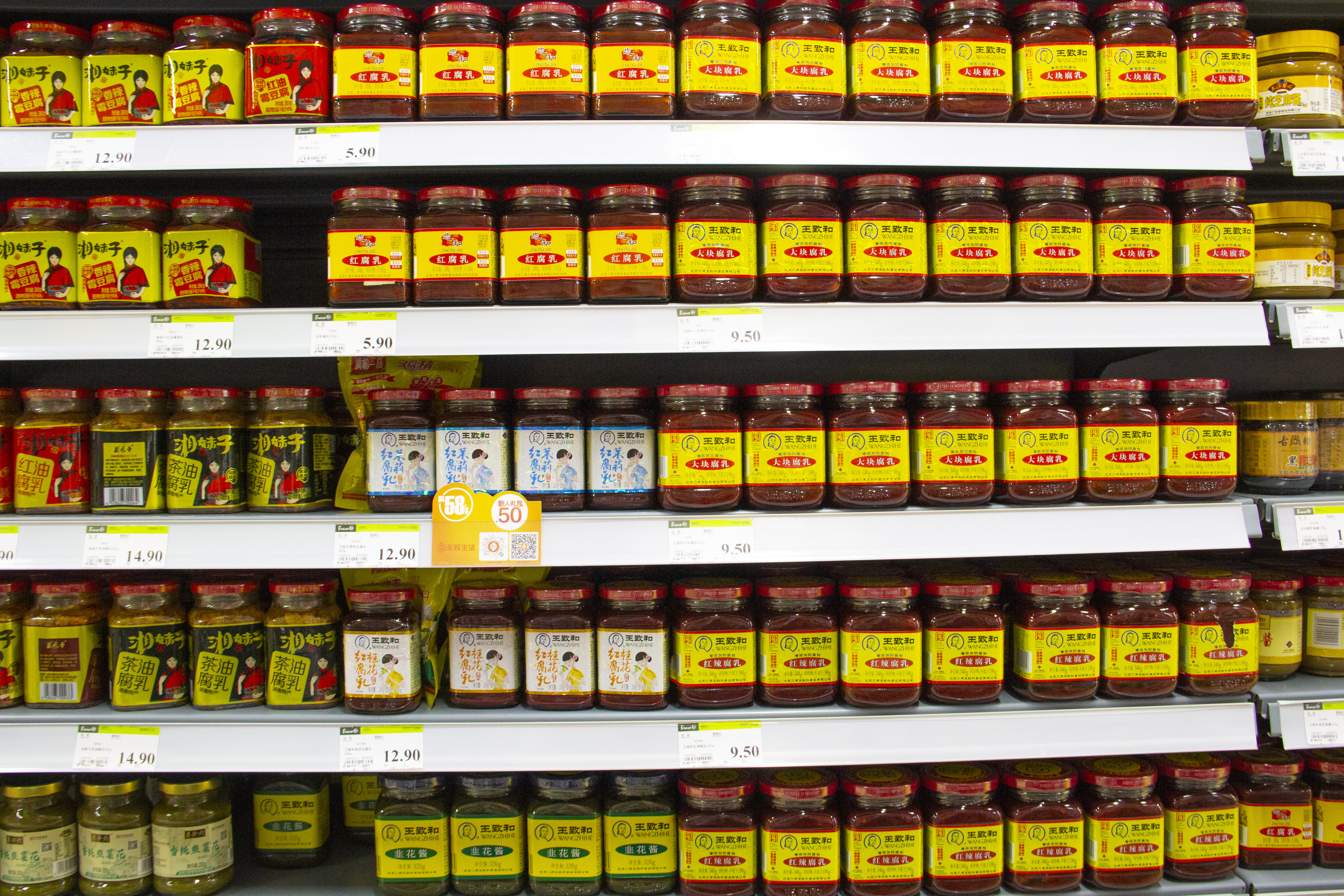
Fermented tofu and other condiments from Wangzhihe

Wangzhihe (Chinese: 王致和), or Beijing Ershang Wangzhihe Food Co. Ltd. (Chinese: 北京二商王致和食品有限公司) is a Chinese brand and company mainly engaged in the production of culinary condiments. The company was first founded in 1669 and is one of the China time-honored brands. It is also one of the oldest companies in China. The name Wangzhihe has become synonymous with fermented bean curd in Beijing.

== History ==
The founder of the company, Wang Zhihe, was originally a scholar from Anhui province who sold tofu during the Qing dynasty.

According to historical accounts, in the 8th year of Kangxi (AD 1669), he failed in the imperial examination in Beijing and ran a tofu shop in the capital to make a living. On one occasion, when Wang Zhihe salted some leftover tofu for preservation, it instead turned moldy and smelled strangely. It was a pity to throw it away and Wang took to eat it. He then discovered that it was of excellent taste, which then became its "fermented bean curd" today. Later, it was introduced into the royal palace and was highly praised by the Empress Dowager Cixi.
