= Fermented bean curd =

Chinese condiment

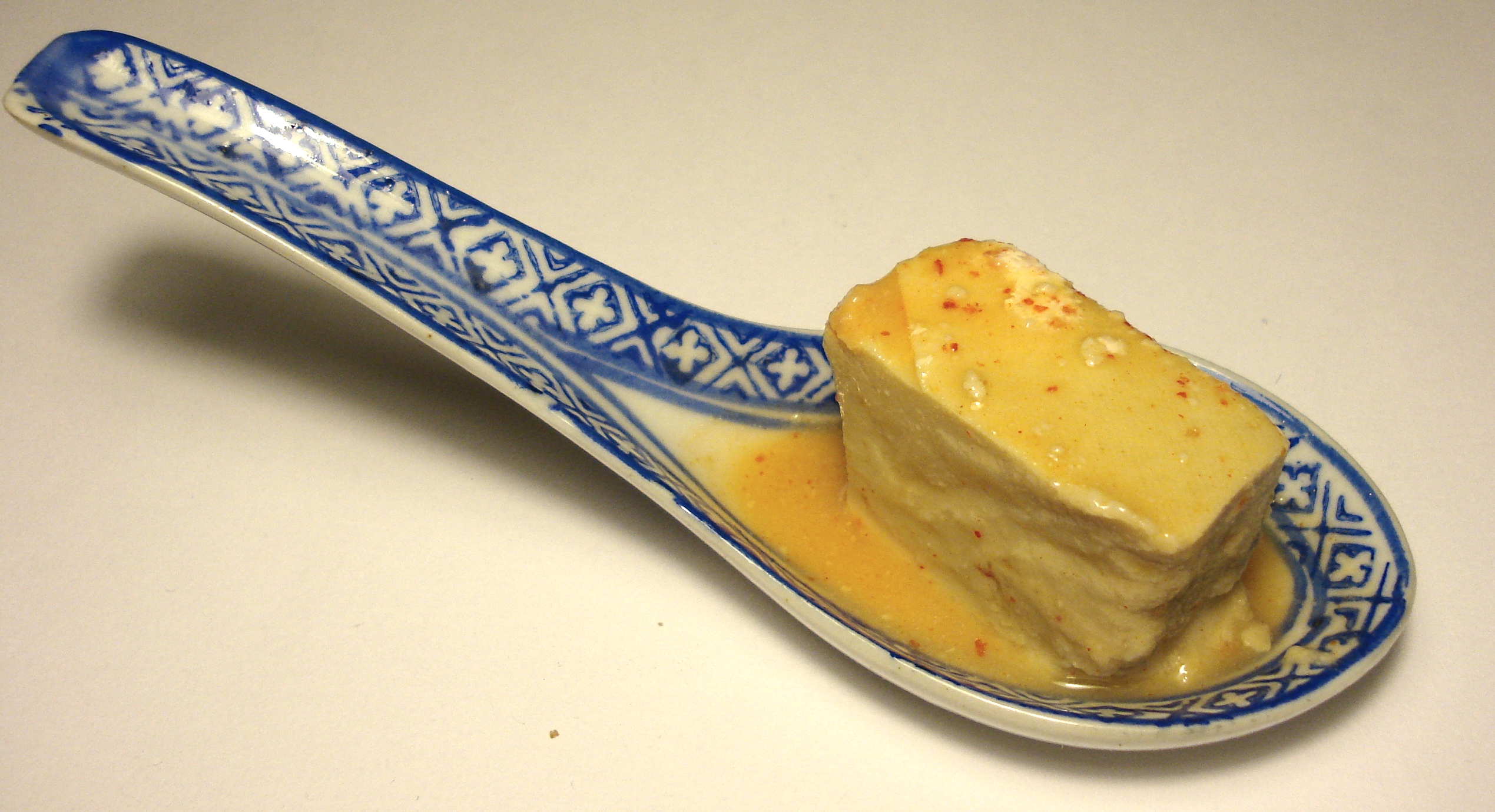
- Fermented tofu

Chinese name
- Chinese: 豆腐乳
- Literal meaning: bean curd cream
Transcriptions
Standard Mandarin
- Hanyu Pinyin: dòufurǔ
- Wade–Giles: tou^{4}-fu^{0}-ju^{3}
Hakka
- Romanization: teu fu nen
Yue: Cantonese
- Yale Romanization: dauh fuh yúh
- Jyutping: dau6 fu6 jyu5

Alternative Chinese name
- Chinese: 腐乳
- Literal meaning: curd cream
Transcriptions
Standard Mandarin
- Hanyu Pinyin: fǔrǔ
Hakka
- Romanization: fu nen
Yue: Cantonese
- Yale Romanization: fuh yúh
- Jyutping: fu6 jyu5

Second alternative Chinese name
- Chinese: 乳腐
- Literal meaning: cream[y] curd
Transcriptions
Wu
- Romanization: zy vu

Third alternative Chinese name
- Chinese: 豆乳
- Literal meaning: bean cream
Transcriptions
Southern Min
- Hokkien POJ: tāu-jú/tāu-lú

Fourth alternative Chinese name
- Chinese: 豆鹹
- Literal meaning: bean salty (i.e. rice topping)
Transcriptions
Southern Min
- Hokkien POJ: tāu-kiâm / tāu-tāⁿ

Fifth alternative Chinese name
- Chinese: 滷腐
- Literal meaning: sauce curd
Transcriptions
Standard Mandarin
- Hanyu Pinyin: lǔfǔ

Vietnamese name
- Vietnamese: chao

Fermented tofu (also called fermented bean curd, white bean-curd cheese, tofu cheese, soy cheese, preserved tofu or sufu) is a Chinese condiment consisting of a form of processed, preserved tofu used in East Asian cuisine; typical ingredients are soybeans, salt, rice wine and sesame oil or vinegar.

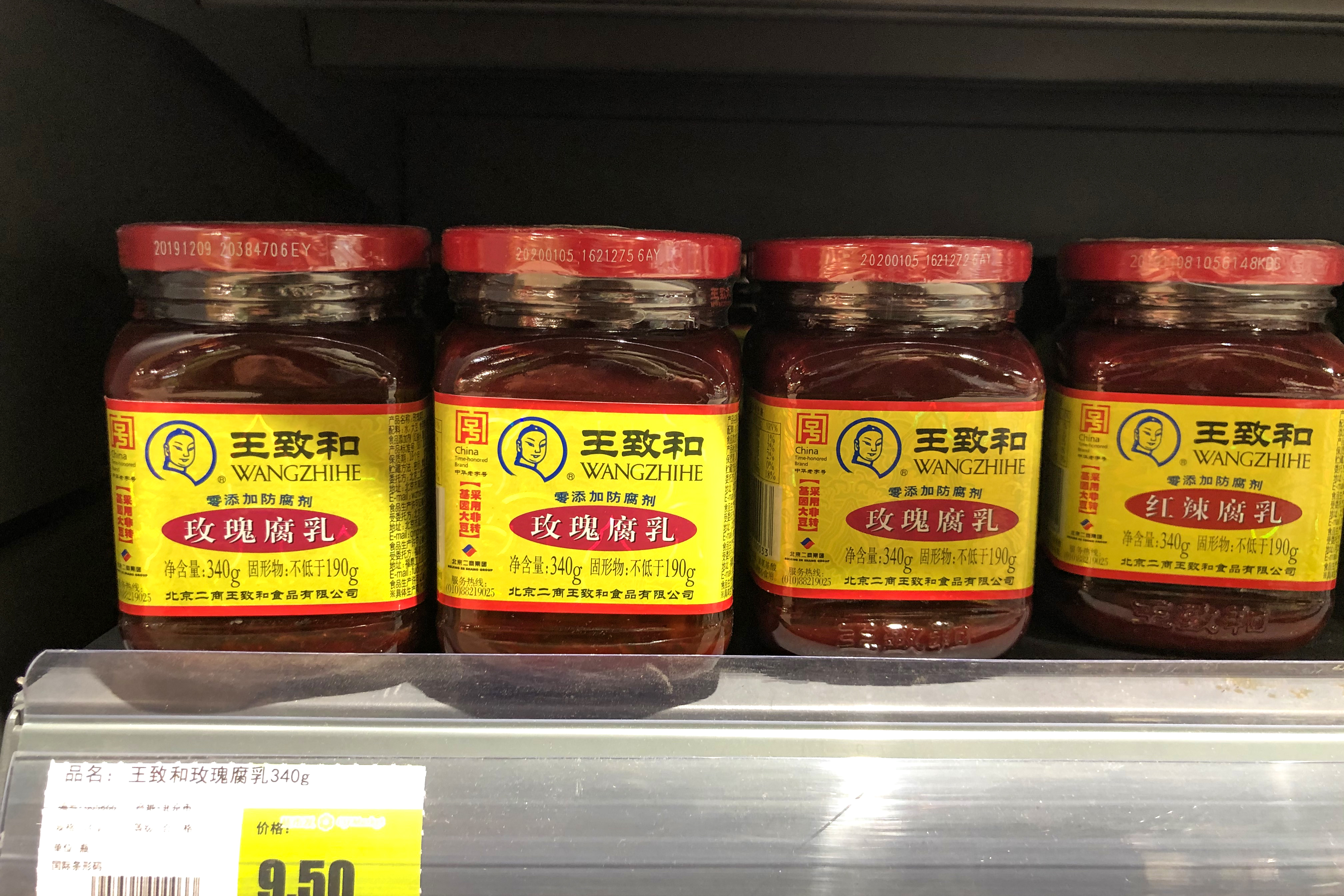
Wangzhihe rose red fermented bean curd (玫瑰腐乳)

== History ==
According to the 1596 Compendium of Materia Medica written by the Chinese polymath Li Shizhen during the Ming dynasty, the creation of tofu is attributed to the Western Han dynasty Prince Liu An (179 – 122 BC), prince of Huainan. Manufacturing began during the Han dynasty in China after it was created. It is disputed whether Li Shizhen mentioned fermentation of tofu, however. A clear reference to fermented tofu appeared in the 1610 Penglong Yehua (蓬櫳夜話), under the name haifu (醢腐).

In 1818, Englishman Basil Hall wrote about a red, cheese-like substance served in Ryukyu; he might be referring to fermented tofu. In 1855, Frenchman Baron de Montgaudry described the making of tofu and fermented tofu in writing.

=== Names ===
In Mandarin, the product is generally known as dòufǔrǔ (豆腐乳), "dòurǔ" (豆乳) or fǔrǔ (腐乳) — though in southwest China it is often known as lǔfǔ (鹵腐). In English, it is sometimes referred to as "soy cheese".

== Nutrition ==
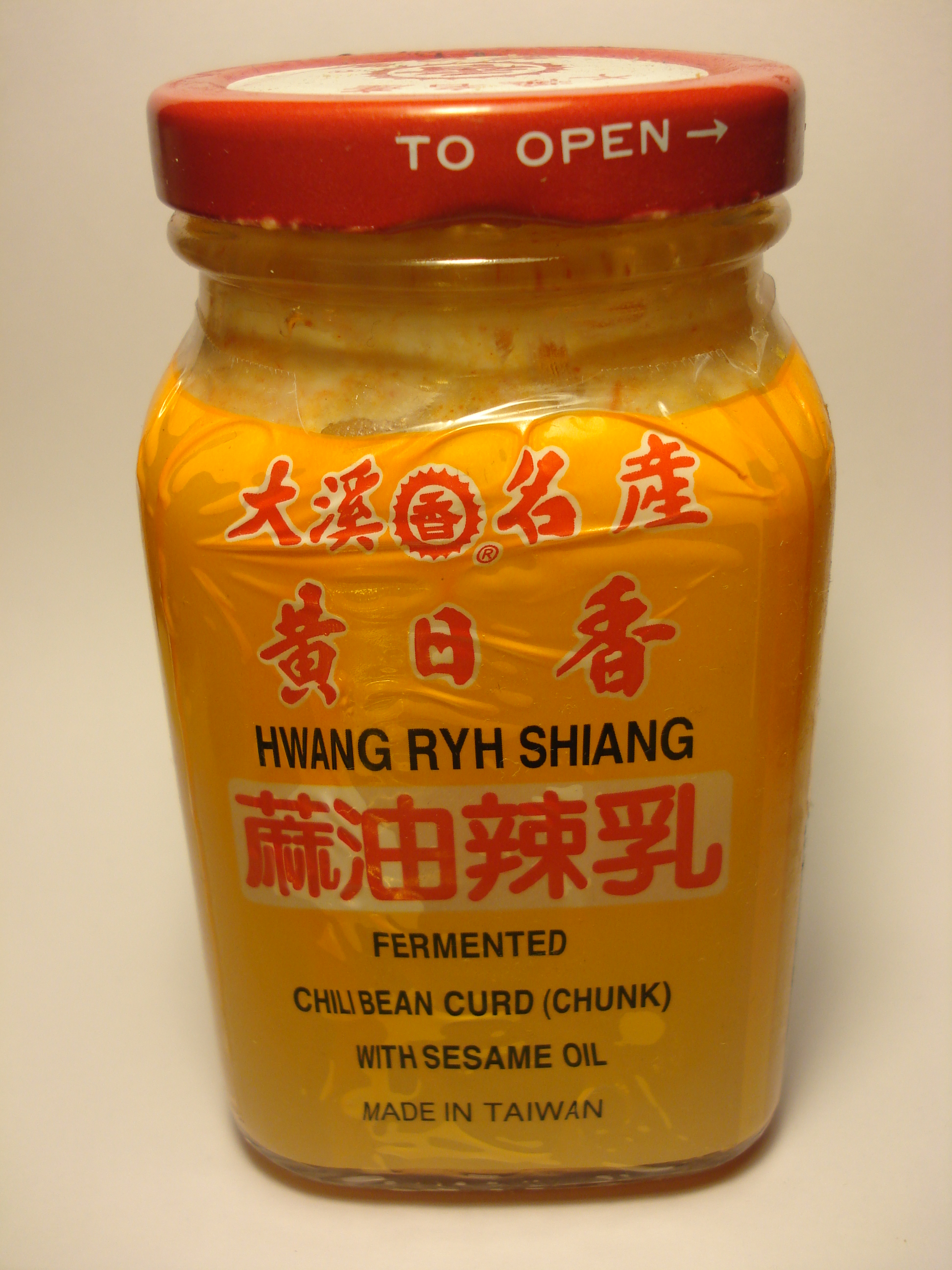
Typical glass bottle of fermented chili bean curd

=== Nutritional value ===
Fermented bean curd contains organic acids, alcohol, esters and other flavor primitives. It contains a large amount of hydrolyzed protein, free amino acids, fat, carbohydrates, thiamine, riboflavin, oxalic acid, calcium, phosphorus and other nutritional ingredients. It contains no cholesterol. The amount of protein in fermented tofu is about 12–22%.

Ho et al. (1989) compared the volatile flavor compounds of red fermented bean curd and white fermented bean curd. Red fermented bean curd contains much larger amounts of alcohols, esters, and acids than the white variety. This may be due to the fermentation of red rice by Monascus spp. The differences in nutritional properties and fermentation between the two varieties are accompanied by differences in flavor and color.

=== Health effects ===
The Food Encyclopedia, written by Wang Su-Hsiung (1861) of the Qing dynasty, made reference to preserved bean curd as superior to difficult-to-digest, hardened tofu especially for the elderly, children, and ill persons. Fermented bean curd is reportedly easier to digest than unfermented bean curd, because it is made through the fermentation process of mold, making the protein more digestible, absorbable, and richer in vitamins. And the microorganisms decompose the phytic acid in the beans, making minerals such as iron and zinc, which are initially poorly absorbed in soybeans, more easily absorbed by the body. So it may be easier for patients, elderly, or children to eat and absorb the nutrients.

It has been suggested that fermented bean curd may have certain health benefits, although there is insufficient data to confirm these claims. One report claims that the fermentation process generates isoflavones, and that fermented bean curd could reduce the risk of coronary heart disease, lower blood pressure, and prevent osteoporosis.

== Characteristics ==
Fermented bean curd has a special mouthfeel similar to certain dairy products due to the breakdown of its proteins which takes place during the air drying and fermentation. Lacking strong flavor prior to fermentation, fermented bean curd takes on the aroma and flavor of its marinade – salty, with mild sweetness. It can be stored for up to several years in a refrigerated environment, during which its flavor is believed to improve.

=== Culinary use ===
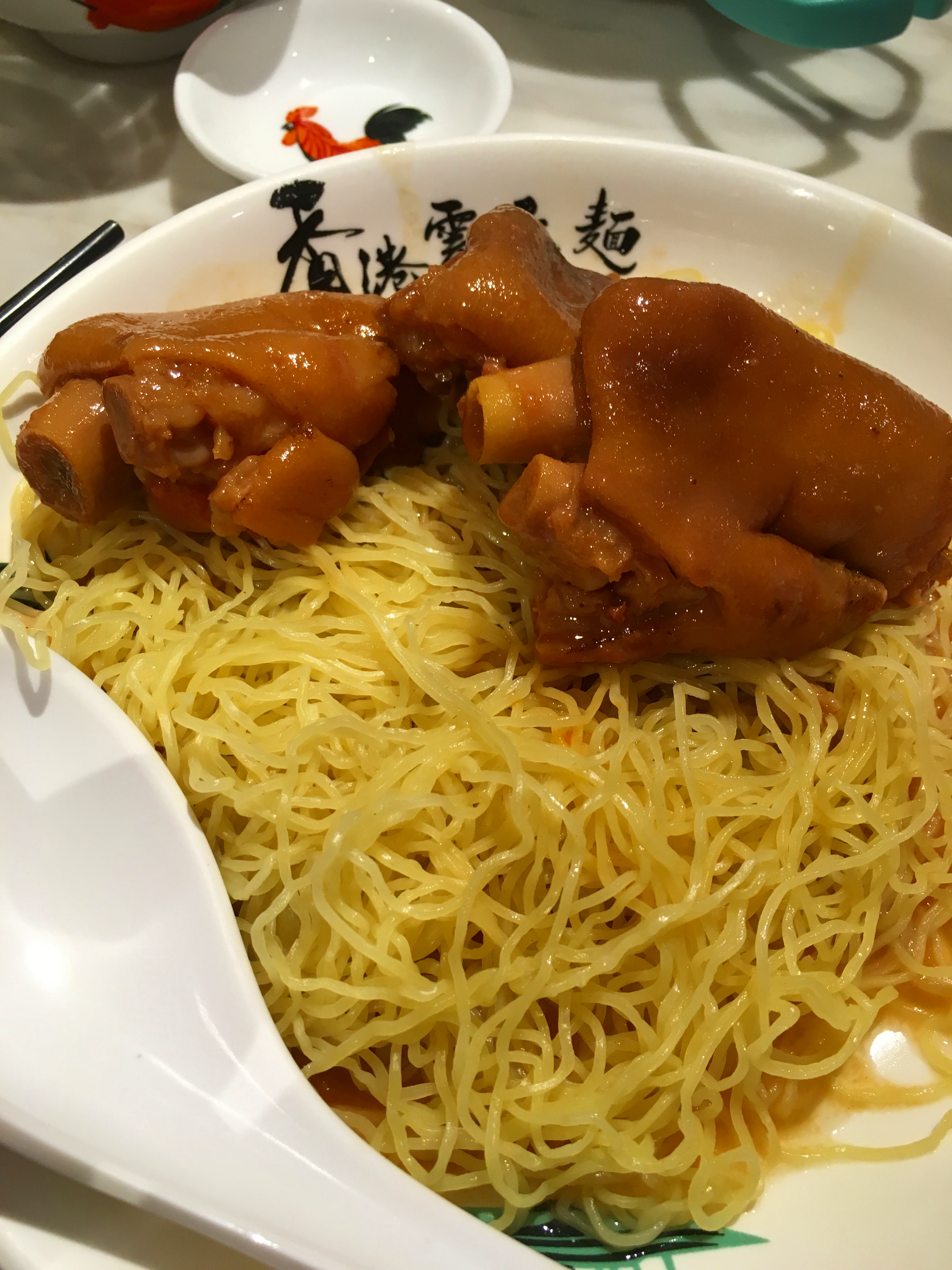
Wonton noodles with pig trotters braised with nam yu (fermented bean curd)

Fermented tofu is commonly used as a condiment, combined into sauces to accompany hot pot, or consumed at breakfast to flavor rice, porridge, gruel, congee, or erkuai. Usually either several bricks are placed in a small bowl covered in the flavored brine or one to one half bricks are placed into a bowl. Then, chunks are broken off the brick and consumed with a mouthful of porridge or gruel. The brine may also be used for flavoring. Fermented bean curd can also be added in small amounts, together with its brine, to flavor stir-fried or braised vegetable dishes (particularly leafy green vegetables such as water spinach). In the Chaoshan region of China, fermented tofu is the main ingredient used to make a stuffed biscuit known as furu bing (腐乳饼).

=== In comparison to cheese ===
Both tofu and cheese are made from curds obtained from the coagulation of soy milk and dairy milk respectively. However, soybean curds are formed from the chemical destabilization of the micelles (using calcium sulfate, magnesium sulfate, etc.) allowing protein bonding while cheese curds are created from the enzymatic (rennet) hydrolysis of casein into para-casein.

Fermented bean curd has been described as a firm, smooth paste resembling creamy blue cheese. Fermented bean curd is sometimes referred to as "Chinese cheese" in English. The process of producing fermented bean curd is analogous to that of cheese: in its non-fermented state, bean curd is comparable to unaged cheese, highly perishable and bland in taste. In comparison, fermented bean curd, like aged cheese, is ripened with microorganisms, resulting in a flavorful paste with a long shelf life.

== Varieties ==
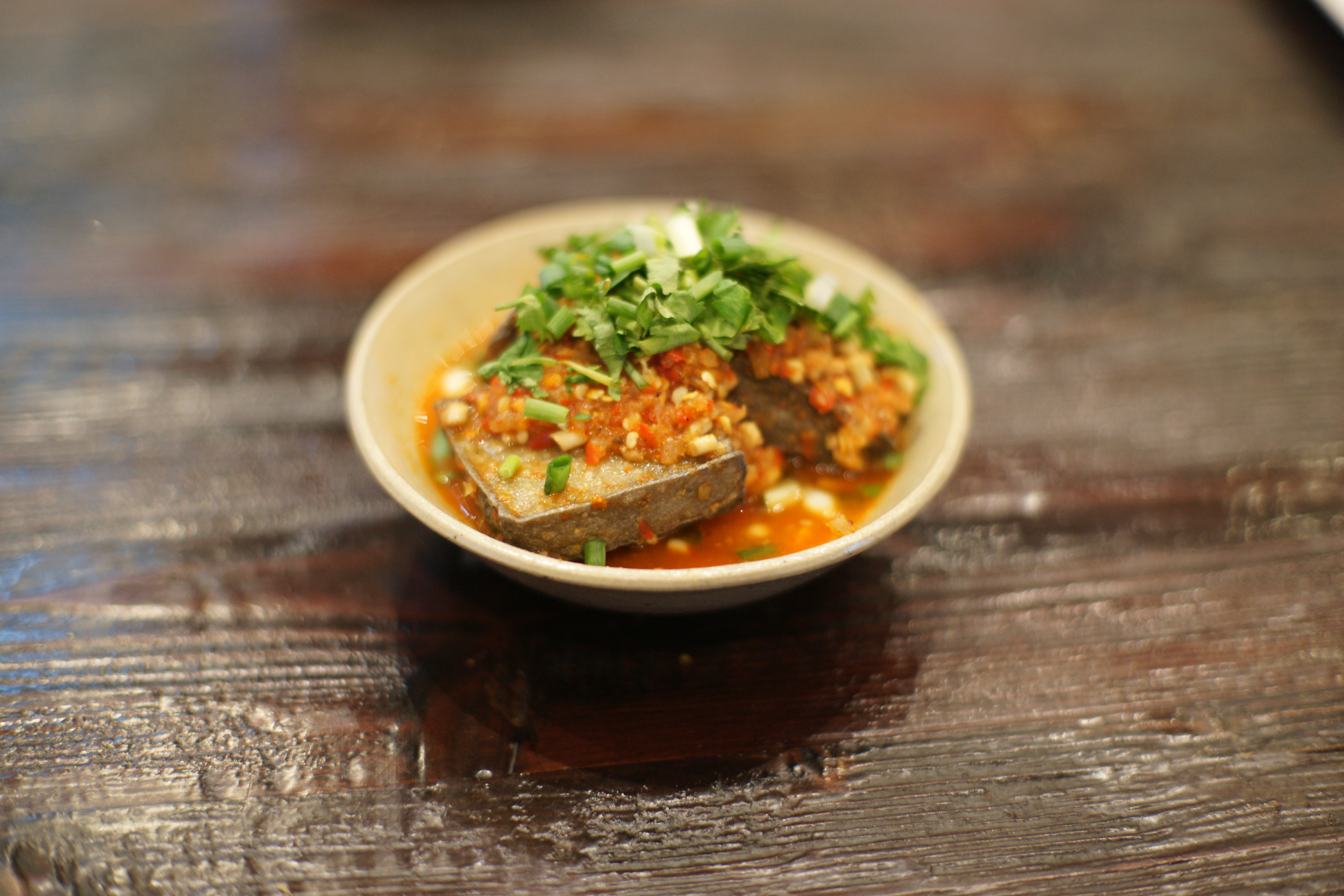
Stinky furu from Guilin.

- White preserved bean curd is the most common type and can be described without the white adjective. The flavor, color and aroma can be altered using various combinations of spices and seasoning in the brine with alterations in the commonly used combination of 10% rice wine and 12% salt. Those with no alcohol produces "small cubes" (小方) while those with double the alcohol content produces "drunken cubes" (醉方). This variety is also available with chili and/or sesame oil. Seasonings can include anise, cinnamon, lemon juice, lemon zest, dried shrimp, and ham. In addition, one can also obtain the curd dried, and without brine, which are then sold in paper cartons.
- Red fermented bean curd (紅腐乳; hóngfǔrǔ, or 南乳; nánrǔ; 'Southern cream'; also nam yu) incorporates red yeast rice (cultivated with Monascus purpureus) with the brining liquor (a salted alcoholic mixture, commonly rice wine, sweet rice wine, or in Taiwan, diluted kaoliang liquor) for a deep-red color and distinctively thickened flavor and aroma. A popular derivative of this variety has an appearance of ketchup and is seasoned with rose wine, caramel and natural sugar.
  - Guangdong red fermented bean curd (廣東南乳) is a similar condiment, traditionally made by fermenting taro which results in a different flavour and texture. It is often confused with hóngfǔrǔ, having a similar red appearance and with modern versions using tofu.
  - Tofuyo (豆腐よう) is the Okinawan name for fermented bean curd. The local variety can be considered a variant of red fermented bean curd, with the key difference being it is pickled in local awamori.
- Stinky fermented bean curd is fermented for over six months and is also popular due to its strong creamy flavor. However, due to its strong acrid smell, this variety is an acquired taste. Note that stinky sufu differs from stinky tofu in appearance, consistency and salt content. Stinky sufu are made in the same cube-like shapes and has a similar smooth soft creamy texture as regular white sufu. In Taiwan, a green version is popular and made with sake lees, crushed leaves and a green mucor mold. It is then fermented for 12 hours and sold on the streets.
- Sauced fermented bean curd (Jiang-rufu; 醬乳腐) is made with curds fermented in a mixture of brine and either fermented bean paste (Jiang) or soy sauce for at least four months. It is usually reddish-brown in color and salty.
  - Ham fermented bean curd (火腿腐乳, 南腿乳腐) is the "sauced" furu with the addition of ham.
- Tofu misozuke (豆腐の味噌漬け) is a bean curd fermented by aging inside a layer of miso and then cloth, during which a culture of lactic acid bacteria develops. It is described in Tofu Hyakuchin.

== Production ==
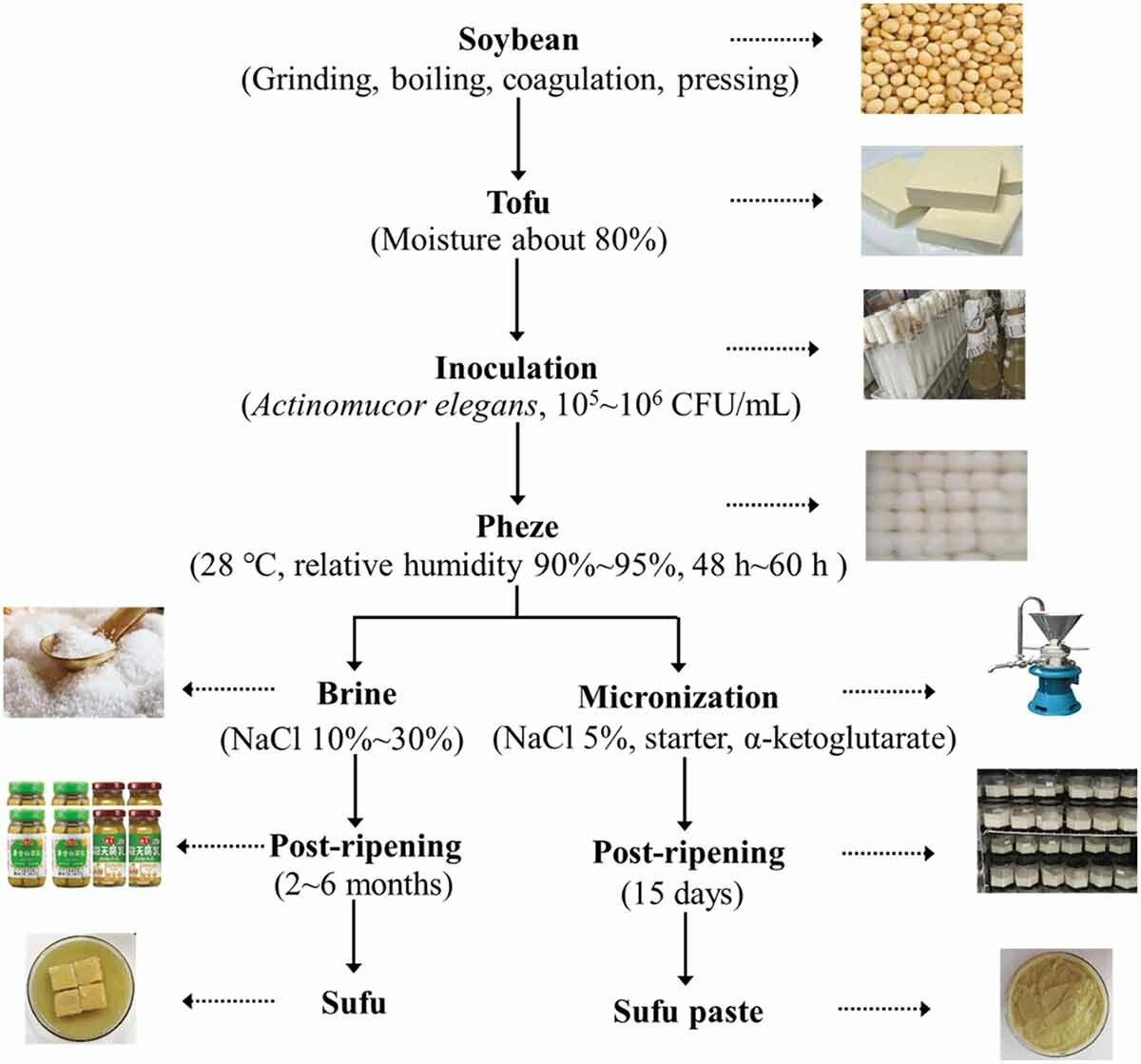
Differences and similarities in the manufacturing of the low-salt Sufu paste (a novel Sufu product) and the Sufu (produced by the normal manufacturing method)

In order to produce fermented bean curd, cubes of dried tofu are allowed to fully air-dry under hay and slowly ferment from aerial bacteria and fungal spores. Commercially available fermented bean curd is made by using dry firm tofu that has been inoculated with the fungal spores of Actinomucor elegans, Mucor sufu, Mucor rouxanus, Mucor wutuongkiao, Mucor racemosus, or Rhizopus spp. This freshly fermented tofu is known as mold tofu (霉豆腐).

The dry fermented tofu is then soaked in brine, typically enhanced with Chinese rice wine, vinegar, chili peppers or sesame oil, or a paste made of rice and soybeans. In the case of red fermented bean curd, red yeast rice (cultivated with Monascus purpureus) is added for color. (Note: The Hwang Ryh Shang Company of Taiwan, a major producer of fermented bean curd, mislabels this ingredient as "red date" (jujube) on the English-language list of ingredients on its product labels , although the Chinese list of ingredients on the same product lists 紅糟 (literally "red lees", i.e. red yeast rice).) Fermented bean curd is generally sold in small glass jars.

== See also ==
- List of fermented soy products
- List of tofu dishes
- Lufu (food) – Type of fermented bean curd
- Stinky tofu – Chinese fermented tofu with a strong odor
