= Biodegradable polymer =

Polymers that break down by bacterial decomposition

Biodegradable polymers are polymers that can be decomposed by the action of living organisms. Whereas most polymers are designed for longevity, biodegradable polymers are not. Biodegradable polymers can be derived from renewable raw materials, petrochemicals, or combinations thereof.

Polymers are the majority component of most plastics, so the topics of biodegradable plastics and biodegradable polymers are intimately related. While the words "bioplastic" and "biodegradable polymer" are similar, they are not synonymous.

- Bioplastics are composed of biologically synthesized polymers, i.e., derived partly or entirely from biomass. Some are biodegradable. Definitions are debated.
- Biodegradable plastics are composed of polymers that can be petroleum-based, biologically derived, or a mixture thereof.

== History ==
Very early work on biodegradable materials necessarily preceded the era of synthetic polymers, which require petrochemicals. This early work focused on natural polymers or their derivatives. One of the first medicinal uses of a biodegradable polymer was the catgut suture, which dates back to at least 100 AD. The first catgut sutures were made from the intestines of sheep, but modern catgut sutures are made from purified collagen extracted from the small intestines of cattle, sheep, or goats.

In the 1830's, cellulose was converted to gun cotton (cellulose nitrate) and then cellulose acetates, which are probably the first biodegradable (semi-synthetic) polymers. Early studies on the biopolymers polyhydroxyalkanoate (PHA) provided the groundwork for its commercial production. Follow-up efforts by W.R. Grace & Co. (USA) failed. When OPEC halted oil exports to the US to boost global oil prices in 1973, efforts to produce polyhydroxybutyrate (PHB) using the strain Alcaligenes latus by Imperial Chemical Industries (ICI UK) also collapsed. The specific PHA produced in this instance was a short-chain-length polyhydroxyalkanoate (scl-PHA). Efforts continue. Related to PHA is polylactic acid (PLA). Studies on its polymerization of lactic acid and its derivatives began at DuPont in the 1930's. In the 1970's, a copolymer of PLA and polyglycolic acid led to the commercialization of Vicryl, resorbable suturing material.

The concept of synthetic biodegradable plastics and polymers was first introduced in the 1980s. In 1992, an international meeting was called where leaders in biodegradable polymers met to discuss a definition, standard, and testing protocol for biodegradable polymers. Also, oversight organizations such as American Society for Testing of Materials (ASTM) and the International Standards Organization (ISO) were created. Some clothing and grocery store chains have pushed to utilize biodegradable bags in the late 2010s.

Industrial production of biodegradable polymers commenced on scale in the late 1990's.

== Types of biodegradable polymers ==
Most biodegradable polymers are polyesters. The ester group (RC(O)OR') is susceptible to hydrolysis by both chemical (i.e. simply exposure to water) and enzymatic action. In addition to polymers, the biodegradability of additives requires attention.

=== Bio-based polymers ===
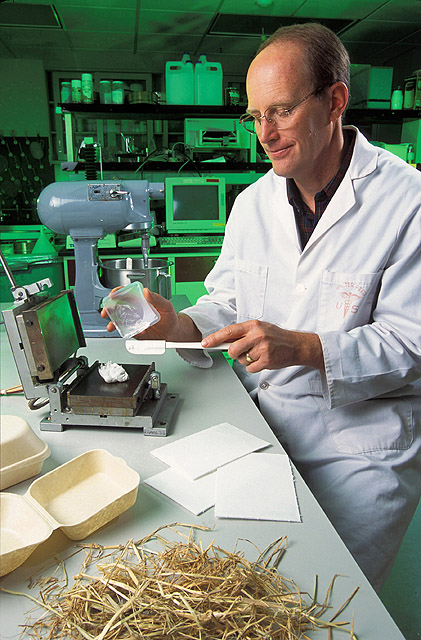
Development of biodegradable containers made from wheat starch

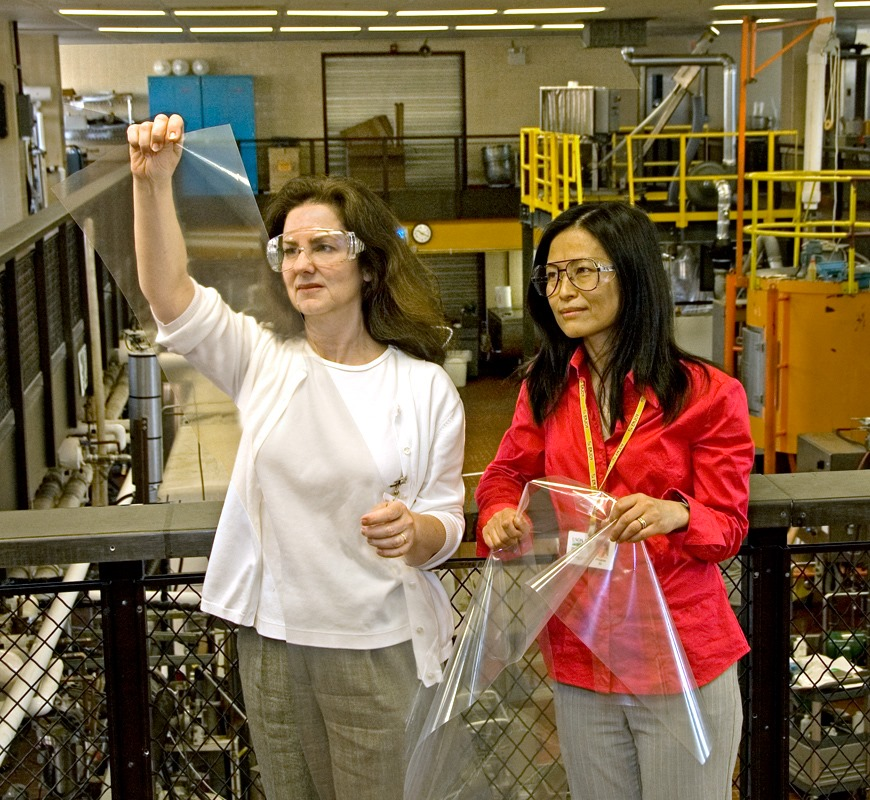
Development of an edible casein film overwrap at USDA

==== Polyhydroxyalkanoates (PHAs) ====
Polyhydroxyalkanoates are a class of biodegradable plastic naturally produced by various micro-organisms (example: Cuprividus necator). Specific types of PHAs include poly-3-hydroxybutyrate (PHB), polyhydroxyvalerate (PHV) and polyhydroxyhexanoate (PHH). The biosynthesis of PHA is usually driven by depriving organisms of certain nutrients (e.g. lack of macro elements such as phosphorus, nitrogen, or oxygen) and supplying an excess of carbon sources. PHA granules are then recovered by rupturing the micro-organisms.

PHA can be further classified into two types:

- scl-PHA from hydroxy fatty acids with short chain lengths including three to five carbon atoms are synthesized by numerous bacteria, including Cupriavidus necator and Alcaligenes latus (PHB).
- mcl-PHA from hydroxy fatty acids with medium chain lengths including six to 14 carbon atoms, can be made for example, by Pseudomonas putida.

Synthetic biology is defining ways to improve yields of PHA's.

==== Polylactic acid (PLA) ====
Polylactic acid is thermoplastic aliphatic polyester synthesized from renewable biomass, typically from fermented plant starch such as from maize, cassava, sugarcane or sugar beet pulp. In 2010, PLA had the second-highest consumption volume of any bioplastic of the world.

PLA is compostable, but non-biodegradable according to American and European standards because it does not biodegrade outside of artificial composting conditions (see § Compostable plastics).

==== Starch blends ====
Starch blends are thermoplastic polymers produced by blending starch with plasticizers. Because starch polymers on their own are brittle at room temperature, plasticizers are added in a process called starch gelatinization to augment its crystallization. While all starches are biodegradable, not all plasticizers are. Thus, the biodegradability of the plasticizer determines the biodegradability of the starch blend.

Biodegradable starch blends include starch/polylactic acid, starch/polycaprolactone, and starch/polybutylene-adipate-co-terephthalate.

Others blends such as starch/polyolefin are not biodegradable.

==== Cellulose-based plastics ====
Cellulose bioplastics are mainly the cellulose esters, (including cellulose acetate and nitrocellulose) and their derivatives, including celluloid. Cellulose can become thermoplastic when extensively modified.

=== Petroleum-based plastics ===
Many of the most widely used petroleum-based plastics resist biodegradation. These recalcitrant materials include polyethylene (PE), polypropylene (PP), and polyvinyl chloride (PVC), representing 58% of synthetic polymers. To some extent, these materials are desirable for their resilience. For example, PVC plumbing is used extensively for sewage, which is corrosive.

==== Polyesters ====
Polyesters, such as polyethylene terephthalate (PET), representing 6.2% of synthetic petroleum-derived polymers are susceptible to biodegradation by the action of esterase enzymes. This conversion has yet to be implemented on an industrial scale.

A few specialized polyesters are prone toward biodegradation. This attractive feature does not address the problem of plastics pollution because these more labile polyesters represent a tiny fraction of synthetic polymers. Polyglycolic acid (PGA) is a thermoplastic polymer derived from the hydroxycarboxylic acid glycolic acid. PGA is often used in medical applications such as PGA sutures for its biodegradability. The ester linkage in the backbone of polyglycolic acid gives it hydrolytic instability. Thus polyglycolic acid can degrade into its nontoxic monomer, glycolic acid, through hydrolysis, This process can be expedited with esterases (enzymes that facilitate hydrolysis of esters). In the body, glycolic acid can enter the tricarboxylic acid cycle, after which can be excreted as water and carbon dioxide. Closely related to PGA is polylactic acid (and PLA-PGA blends). Since lactic acid is obtained biologically, it is discussed as a bio-derived biodegradable material.

Polybutylene succinate (PBS) is derived from succinic acid and 1,4-butanediol. It a thermoplastic polymer resin that is used in packaging films for food and cosmetics. In the agricultural field, PBS is used as a biodegradable mulching film. PBS can be degraded by Amycolatopsis sp. HT-6 and Penicillium sp. strain 14-3. In addition, Microbispora rosea, Excellospora japonica and Excellospora viridilutea have been shown to consume samples of emulsified PBS.

Polycaprolactone (PCL) is obtained by ring-opening polymerization of the monomer caprolactone. It is a prominent implantable biomaterial. It has been shown that Bacillota and Pseudomonadota can degrade PCL. Penicillium sp. strain 26-1 can degrade high density PCL, although not as quickly as thermotolerant Aspergillus sp. strain ST-01. Species of clostridium can degrade PCL under anaerobic conditions.

Polybutylene adipate terephthalate (PBAT) is another biodegradable copolymer. It is derived from butanediol and two kinds of dicarboxylic acids, adipic acid and terephthalic acid.

A prominent omission from the list of biodegradable polyesters is polyethylene terephthalate (PET), of which >80M tons/y are produced. Bacteria and their associated enzymes that degrade PET have been identified, but the conversions are slow.

==== Poly(vinyl alcohol) (PVA, PVOH) ====
Poly(vinyl alcohol) is one of the few biodegradable vinyl polymers that is soluble in water. Due to its solubility in water (an inexpensive and harmless solvent), PVA has a wide range of applications including 3d printing, food packaging, textiles coating, paper coating, and healthcare products.

=== Other biodegradable polymers ===
Motivated significantly by medical applications, many bio-derived and totally synthetic polymers have been developed with varying degrees of biodegradation. Some of these polymers are polyanhydrides, polyacetals, poly(ortho esters), polyurethanes, polycarbonates, and polyamides.

== Biodegradation pathways and mechanisms ==
Most biodegradable polymers are polyesters. They break down by hydrolysis, i.e., a cleavage (lysis) with water to give a carboxylic acid (RCO2H) and an alcohol (ROH):

(RCO_{2}R')_{n} + n H_{2}O → n RCO_{2}H + n R'OH

The cases of polyesters derived from hydroxyl carboxylic acids (PLA, PCA, PHB), the alcohol and the carboxylic acid are part of the same monomer, so the equation for hydrolysis is simplified:

(OCHRCO_{2}')_{n} + n H_{2}O → n HOCHRCO_{2}H

To be even more precise, at neutral pH, the carboxylic acid exists as the carboxylate:

(OCHRCO_{2})_{n} + n H_{2}O → n HOCHRCO^{−}_{2} + n H^{+}

Hydrolysis can induced by "chemical" routes (no enzymes) or enzyme-catalyzed. These enzymes are exported from a cell or result from the rupture of some cell. Polymers are too large to enter cells. Chemical hydrolysis can be very slow, but the presence of acids, bases, and mineral surfaces promote the process. Once the polyesters are fully hydrolyzed, the monomers are suited for complete degradation by entering the cellular environment and being metabolized. Microbial degradation is sometimes considered as a 3-step process. Ultimately the biodegradation affords H_{2}O and CO_{2}.

Biodegradability is a "system property". That is, whether a particular plastic item will biodegrade depends not only on the intrinsic properties of the item, but also on the conditions in the environment in which it ends up. The rate at which plastic biodegrades depends on a wide range of environmental conditions, including temperature, its physical size, and the presence of specific microorganisms. Synthetic polyolefins (polyethylene, etc) are some of the least degradable.

Depressed plastics recovery rates can be attributed to conventional plastics are often commingled with organic wastes (food scraps, wet paper, and liquids), leading to accumulation of waste in landfills and natural habitats. On the other hand, composting of these mixed organics (food scraps, yard trimmings, and wet, non-recyclable paper) is a potential strategy for recovering large quantities of waste and dramatically increasing community recycling goals. As of 2015, food scraps and wet, non-recyclable paper respectively comprise 39.6 million and 67.9 million tons of municipal solid waste.

== Applications and uses ==
Biodegradable polymers are of significant interest to medicine, agriculture, and packaging.

=== Medical ===
One of the most active areas of research in biodegradable polymer is in controlled drug delivery. In order for a biodegradable polymer to be used as a therapeutic, it must meet several criteria:

1. Be non-toxic in order to eliminate foreign body response;
2. The time it takes for the polymer to degrade is proportional to the time required for therapy;
3. The products resulting from biodegradation are not cytotoxic and are readily eliminated from the body;
4. The material must be easily processed in order to tailor the mechanical properties for the required task;
5. Be easily sterilized;
6. Have acceptable shelf life.

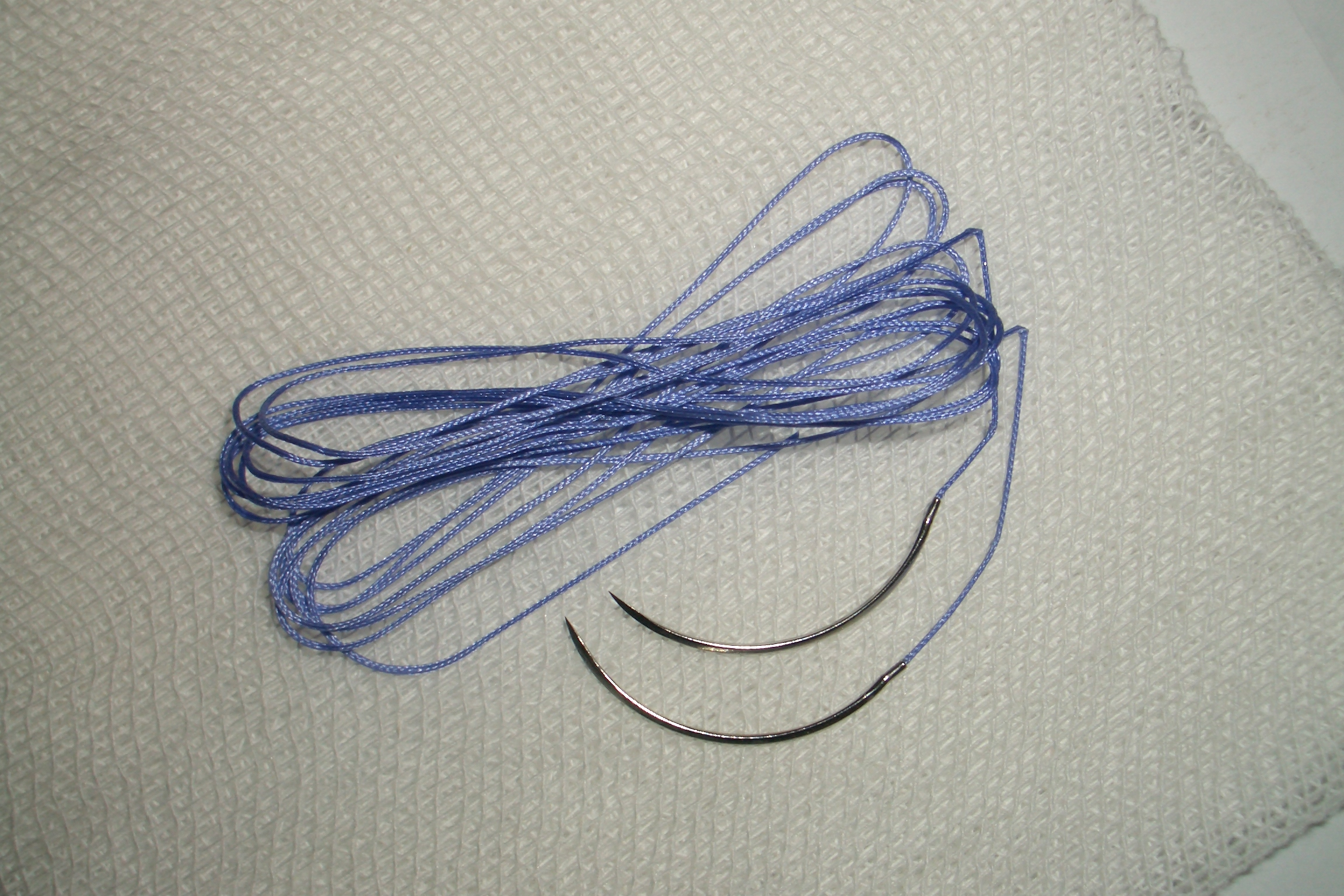
Sutures made from polyglycolic acid. These sutures are absorbable and will be degraded by the body over time.

Biodegradable polymers and biomaterials are also of significant interest for tissue engineering and regeneration. Tissue engineering is the ability to regenerate tissue with the help of artificial materials. The perfection of such systems can be used to grow tissues and cells in vitro or use a biodegradable scaffold to construct new structures and organs in vitro. For these uses, a biodegradable scaffold is obviously preferred as it reduces the risk of immunological reaction and rejection of the foreign object. While many of the more advanced systems are not ready for human therapeutics, there is significant positive research in animal studies. For example, it was possible to successfully grow rat smooth muscle tissue on a polycaprolactone/polylactide scaffold. Further research and development may allow for this technology to be used for tissue replacement, support, or enhancement in humans. One of the ultimate goals of tissue engineering is the creation of organs, such as the kidney, from basic constituents. A scaffolding is necessary to grow the entity into a functioning organ, after which the polymer scaffold would degrade and be safely eliminated from the body. There are reports of using polyglycolic acid and polylactic acid to engineer vascular tissue for heart repair. The scaffold can be used to help create undamaged arteries and vessels.

In addition to tissue engineering, biodegradable polymers are being used in orthopedic applications, such as bone and joint replacement. A variety of non-biodegradable polymers have been used for orthopedic applications including silicone rubber, polyethylene, acrylic resins, polyurethane, polypropylene, and polymethylmethacrylate. The primary role of many of these polymers was to act as a biocompatible cement in the fixation of prostheses and in the replacement of joints. Other polymers include polyglycolide, polylactide, polyhydroxobutyrate, chitosan, hyaluronic acid, and hydrogels. In particular, poly(2-hydroxyethyl-methacrylate), polyethylene glycol, chitosan, and hyaluronic acid have been used extensively in the repair of cartilage, ligaments, and tendons. For example, poly(L-lactide) (PLA), is used to make screws and darts for meniscal repair and is marketed under the trade name Clearfix Mensical Dart/Screw. PLA is a slow degrading polymer and requires times greater than two years to degrade and be absorbed by the body.

=== Packaging and materials ===
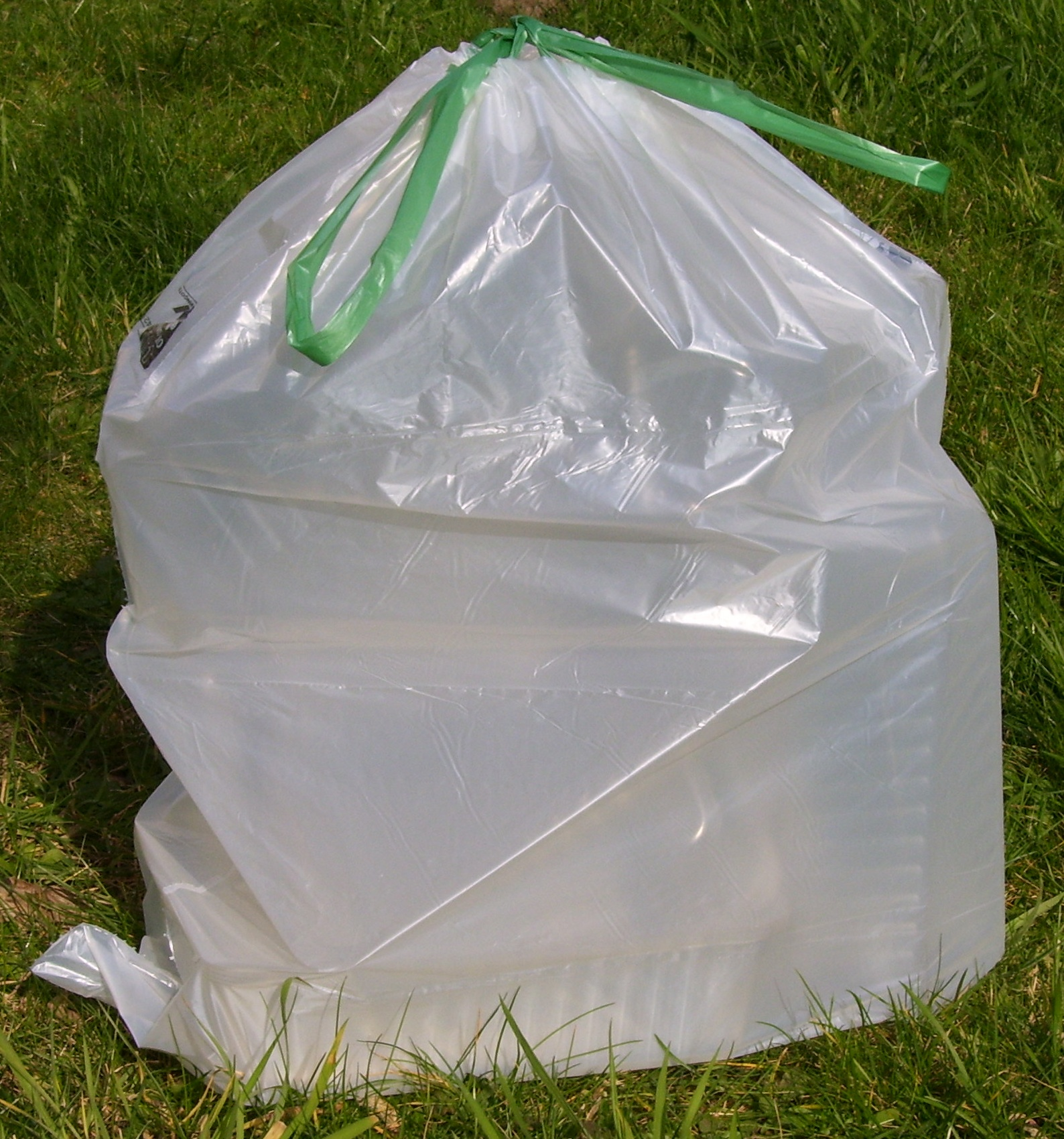
A trash bag made of a poly(lactic acid) blend, marketed under the brand Bio-Flex®

Biodegradable plastics could replace some traditional plastics that persist in landfills and minimize plastic pollution. According to a 2010 report of the United States Environmental Protection Agency (EPA) the US had 31 million tons of plastic waste, representing 12.4% of all municipal solid waste. Of that, 2.55 million tons were recovered. This 8.2% recovery was much less than the 34.1% overall recovery percentage for municipal solid waste.

Biodegradable plastics can replace the non-degradable plastics in these waste streams, making municipal composting a significant tool to divert large amounts of otherwise nonrecoverable waste from landfills. Compostable plastics combine the utility of plastics (lightweight, resistance, relative low cost) with the ability to completely and fully compost in an industrial compost facility. Rather than worrying about recycling a relatively small quantity of commingled plastics, proponents argue that certified biodegradable plastics can be readily commingled with other organic wastes, thereby enabling composting of a much larger portion of nonrecoverable solid waste.

The use of biodegradable plastics, therefore, is seen as enabling the complete recovery of large quantities of municipal solid waste (via aerobic composting and feedstocks) that have heretofore been unrecoverable by other means except land filling or incineration.

In addition to medicine, biodegradable polymers are often used to reduce the volume of waste in packaging materials. There is also significant effort to replace materials derived from petrochemicals with those that can be made from biodegradable components. One of the most commonly used polymers for packaging purposes is polylactic acid, PLA. The production of PLA has several advantages, the most important of which is the ability to tailor the physical properties of the polymer through processing methods. PLA is used for a variety of films, wrappings, and containers (including bottles and cups). In 2002, FDA ruled that PLA was safe to use in all food packaging.

== Regulations/standards ==
To ensure the integrity of products labelled as "biodegradable", the following standards have been established:

=== United States ===
The Biodegradable Products Institute (BPI) is the primary certification organization in the US. ASTM International defines methods to test for biodegradable plastic, both anaerobically and aerobically, as well as in marine environments. The specific subcommittee responsibility for overseeing these standards falls on the Committee D20.96 on Environmentally Degradable Plastics and Bio based Products. The current ASTM standards are defined as standard specifications and standard test methods. Standard specifications create a pass or fail scenario whereas standard test methods identify the specific testing parameters for facilitating specific time frames and toxicity of biodegradable tests on plastics.

==== Anaerobic conditions ====
Test methodology	Title
ASTM D5511-18	Standard Test Method for Determining Anaerobic Biodegradation of Plastic Materials Under High-Solids Anaerobic-Digestion Conditions
ASTM D5526-18	Standard Test Method for Determining Anaerobic Biodegradation of Plastic Materials Under Accelerated Landfill Conditions

Both standards above indicate that a minimum of 70% of the material should have biodegraded by 30 days (ASTM D5511-18) or the duration of the testing procedure (ASTM D5526-18) to be considered biodegradable under anaerobic conditions. Test methodologies provide guidelines on testing but provide no pass/fail guidance on results.

==== Aerobic conditions ====
Specification	Title
ASTM D6400	Standard Specification for Labeling of Plastics Designed to be Aerobically Composted in Municipal or Industrial Facilities
ASTM D6868	Standard Specification for Labeling of End Items that Incorporate Plastics and Polymers as Coatings or Additives with Paper and Other Substrates Designed to be Aerobically Composted in Municipal or Industrial Facilities

Both standards above outline procedures for testing and labelling biodegradability in aerobic composting conditions. Plastics can be classified as biodegradable in aerobic environments when 90% of the material is fully mineralized into CO_{2} within 180 days (~6 months). Specifications carry pass/fail criteria and reporting.

=== European Union standards ===
==== Anaerobic conditions ====
Standard	Title
EN 13432:2000	Packaging: requirements for packaging recoverable through composting and biodegradation

Similar to the US standards, the European standard requires that 90% of the polymer fragments be fully mineralized into CO_{2} within 6 months.

==== Aerobic conditions ====
Standard	Title
EN 14046:2004	Evaluation of the ultimate aerobic biodegradability and disintegration of packaging materials under controlled composting conditions.

==== European standards ====
In November 2022, the European Commission proposed an EU regulation to replace the 1994 Packaging and packaging waste directive, along with a communication to clarify the labels biobased, biodegradable, and compostable.

=== British standards ===
In October 2020 British Standards published new standards for biodegradable plastic. In order to comply with the standards biodegradable plastic must degrade to a wax which contains no microplastics or nanoplastics within two years. The breakdown of the plastics can be triggered by exposure to sunlight, air and water. Chief executive of Polymateria, Niall Dunne, said his company had created polyethylene film which degraded within 226 days and plastic cups which broke down in 336 days.

== See also ==
- Biodegradation
- Biodegradable additives
- Biodegradable bags
- Biodegradable waste
- Bioplastic
- BioSphere Plastic
- Cellophane
- Dedicated bio-based chemical
- Economics of plastics processing
- Microplastics
- Organisms breaking down plastic
- Photodegradation
- Plastic bag
