= Polymateria =

British private technology company

- Type: Private limited company
- Industry: Plastics engineering
- Founded: 2015
- Founders: Jonathan Sieff, Lee Davy-Martin
- Headquarters: I-HUB, Imperial College London, London, UK
- Area served: Worldwide
- Key people: Niall Dunne (CEO), Florence Huynh (VP, Innovations), Marc Bolland (Chairman)
- Products: Biodegradable plastic masterbatch
- Brands: Lyfecycle
- Number of employees: 59 (2023)
- Website: https://www.polymateria.com/

Polymateria Ltd is a British technology company developing biodegradable plastic alternatives. In 2020, the privately owned company was the first to achieve certified biodegradation of the most commonly-littered forms of plastic packaging in real-world conditions, in less than a year without creating microplastics.

== History ==
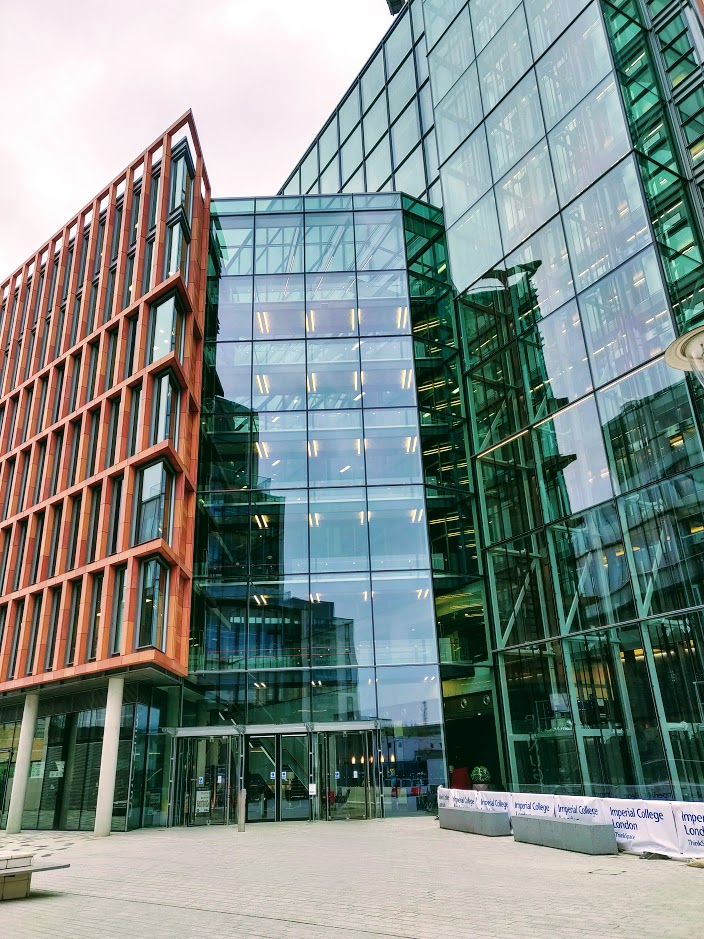
Translation & Innovation Hub of Imperial College London, location of the company's headquarters

Polymateria was founded in 2015 at Imperial College London by Jonathan Sieff and Lee Davy-Martin. Between 2016 and 2017, it was based at the Imperial White City Incubator, and since 2017 has been headquartered at the nearby Translation & Innovation Hub (I-HUB). In January 2018, Niall Dunne became CEO, and in March 2018 the company brought its first product to market.

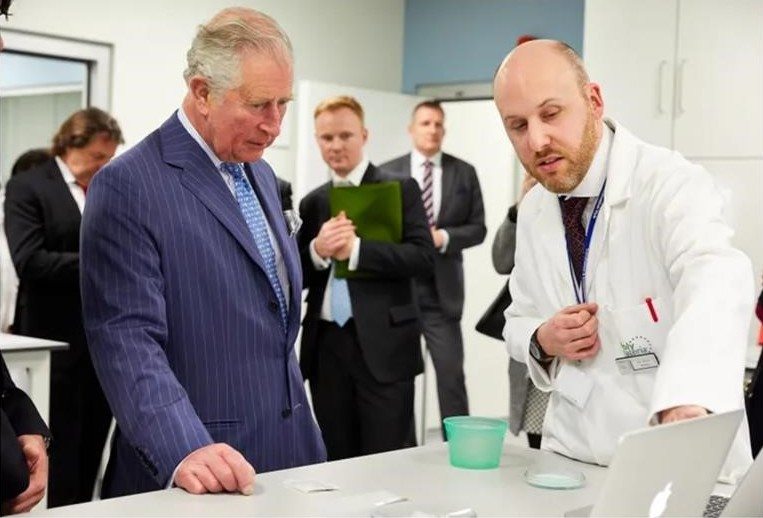
The Prince of Wales at the Polymateria labs in 2019, being shown a cup made of the company's material by Christopher Wallis (right)

Prince Charles visited the Polymateria laboratories in March 2019. In October 2019, Polymateria announced a partnership with specialty chemical company Clariant to bring its new Biotransformation technology to the Southeast Asian market. A subsequent partnership agreement between Polymateria, Clariant and the Indian Ministry of Chemicals and Fertilizers announced in January 2020 aims to bring Biotransformation to India.

In July 2020, the impact investing platform Planet First Partners (PFP) invested £15 million in Polymateria. Alongside the investment, several people joined the Polymateria board, including PFP head Frédéric de Mévius and former Marks & Spencer CEO Marc Bolland as chairman. The same month, it was reported that Puma would be the first company to use Polymateria's technology in the 160 million plastic bags it used each year, starting September 2020 in Southeast Asian markets, and in Britain in 2021. The family of Hong Kong billionaire Silas Chou, whose daughter Veronica Chou was said to be pushing for more sustainability in the fashion industry, invested in Polymateria in 2020. Two years after Polymateria CEO Niall Dunne announced his company's intention to become the "Tesla of plastics", (Note: In May 2023 CEO Dunne stated that this had been misreported, and he had never made that claim. However, by then he had embraced it, saying "Winners do what Tesla did".) in November 2020, former Tesla executive Steven Altmann-Richer joined Polymateria as head of public affairs and regulatory strategy. Also in November 2020, the company hinted that its product was already being tested in commercial food packaging in the UK, Spain, Portugal, Taiwan and Kenya, although it did not reveal which brands or products were involved.

In February 2021, clothing company Pour les Femmes announced that it would be using Polymateria's biodegradable plastic in its packaging. Electric racing series Extreme E revealed in March 2021 its partnership with Polymateria, which will supply cups and food packaging for the event, and later collect these for recycling. In April 2021, FiberVisions and Avgol, two companies owned by Thai Indorama Ventures, partnered with Polymateria, planning to apply the technology to their nonwoven fabrics, which are used for products like face masks and diapers. The company signed a deal in September 2021 with Taiwanese Formosa Plastics Corp, potentially worth US$100 million in license fees. By then, Polymateria's plastics were also used in some of the packaging of Taiwanese 7-Eleven stores.

The technology was demonstrated during the 2022 Chicago Marathon, on sugarcane-based recovery bags for the runners.

Since 2023, their technology has been branded as "Lyfecycle", and in that same year was applied to plastic bags from Indian fashion brand Doodlage. In April 2023, Polymateria partnered with Toppan Specialty Films, an Indian plastic manufacturer based in the Punjab region. In May 2023, the company received another £20 million investment, while also signing a deal with a subsidiary of Lotte Chemical to develop products in Malaysia. After the £20 million investment, CEO Dunne announced expansion plans for the company, and also hinted that turnover was in the lower millions, and that the company had experienced growth of 300% between 2021 and 2022.

By January 2024 the company had introduced a biodegradeable baler twine which was produced by a Portuguese firm.

== Biodegradable plastics ==
=== Biotransformation technology ===
The company has developed a technology called Biotransformation, which involves adding a masterbatch to plastics during production to aid their decomposition. The technology is applicable to polyolefins, which include the most commonly littered types of plastics: polyethylene (e.g. plastic bags, packaging) and polypropylene (e.g. plastic cups, bottle caps). (Note: "Commonly littered" in this context refers to plastic waste that accumulates in the environment, especially in aquatic environments as found by a meta-study published in Marine Pollution Bulletin.) Although these plastics can still be recycled, they will also decompose into a waxy substance in less than a year, provided they are exposed to environmental conditions such as sunlight, air and water. Ecotoxicity tests have shown that this intermediary wax is "non-harmful for contact with soil, plants and the aquatic environment". Bacteria and fungi will then digest the wax and break it down into carbon dioxide and water. It does not leave behind microplastics, a common problem of previous biodegradable products. According to Polymateria, this is achieved because the additives do not just break down the amorphous, but also the crystalline regions of the polymer. The resulting substance thus has a molecular weight of only around 600–1000 daltons, compared to existing technologies which were unable to get below 5000 daltons. At these lower levels, the polymer is broken down enough to become a waxy substance biologically available to microbes. Under sub-optimal conditions, degradation might take slightly longer, with an experimental flowerpot taking up to two years to dissolve if "tossed in a ditch".

The company claims that the onset of biodegradation can be precisely time-controlled, so plastics won't deteriorate before recycling can happen. CEO Dunne said it was looking to apply "terms consumers understand" to the new packaging, such as "recycle-by dates or where recycling isn’t an option dispose-by dates".

Production of the additive in form of a masterbatch was done at a factory in Clermont-Ferrand in 2020, but the company was in talks for a larger facility in India. The technology is expected to increase the cost of packaging by 10 to 15 percent.

A study of Polymateria's plastic biodegradation performance was published in Polymers in July 2021.

=== BSI standard ===
In 2020, a new British standard for biodegradability named PAS 9017 was adopted by the BSI Group. Polymateria had sponsored the standard, which was reviewed by the Waste & Resources Action Programme (WRAP), the Department for Environment, Food and Rural Affairs and the Department for Business, Energy and Industrial Strategy. Polymateria's product became the first to reach the new benchmark. Ecologist Dannielle Green of Anglia Ruskin University, who was involved in validating the standard, called it a "step in the right direction" and praised the "interdisciplinary collaborative approach" taken by the BSI.

=== Criticism and rebuttal ===
The BSI standard was criticised on 22 October 2020 in an open letter by a group of 40 organizations, including Tesco, Aldi and the Environmental Services Association. The letter called upon the UK government to "follow the lead" of the European Union in banning oxo-degradable plastics, warning of the dangers of "microplastics [...] entering the food chain" and claiming that "degradable plastic alternatives will disrupt [Britain]'s recycling facilities". WRAP, a registered charity that was on the steering committee for the standard, responded to inquiries by declaring that its involvement should not be mistaken as an endorsement of the standard. However, WRAP maintained that littering was a "real issue" and that it would continue to encourage "developments in plastics technologies which have no negative impact on the ability for plastic to be effectively recycled and have no negative impacts to the natural environment". After a "small but significant anomaly" was found in the BSI consultation process, WRAP said in December 2020 that the committee was due to meet in January the next year to discuss details of the testing process for microplastics. However, Polymateria's Biotransformation technology does not involve the oxo-degradable plastics criticized by the open letter, (Note: The FAQ for the BSI standard explicitly states that it does not deal with oxo-degradeable plastics. Polymateria's CEO Dunne has also lauded the EU ban on oxo-degradable plastics.) which are often confused with biodegradable plastics. It also does not produce microplastics (as required by the PAS 9017 standard), and the company insists its chemical additive has "no adverse impact on recycling streams".

Environmental organizations that have criticized the BSI standard have included the WWF and Keep Britain Tidy, which voiced concerns that degradable plastics would increase littering. Polymateria CEO Dunne countered by declaring that the main problem were exports to non-EU countries where the plastic waste was "not being recycled and is winding up in unmanaged waste systems." (Note: For more on the issue, see Plastic pollution#Major plastic waste generator and polluter countries and Global waste trade#Plastic waste.) The BSI has responded by calling littering "illegal" and a "complex behavioural issue", voicing doubts that any standard would be able to "control how a member of the public acts". The "recycle-by" date stamped on Polymateria's plastics is also meant to encourage consumers to recycle the product, instead of throwing it away.

== See also ==
- Biodegradable polymer
- Circular economy
