= Tscharna Rayss =

Russian-Israeli botanist (1890–1965)

Tscharna Rayss (Hebrew: צ'רנה רייס; 1890–1965) was a Jewish-Israeli botanist, phycologist, and mycologist noted for studying species in the Mediterranean and Red Sea. Born in Vinnitsa, Russian Empire was in charge of research at the universities of Odessa and Bucharest. She joined the newly formed botany department of the Hebrew University in Jerusalem in 1934 and was appointed professor in 1951.
