= Niall Dunne =

Irish businessman

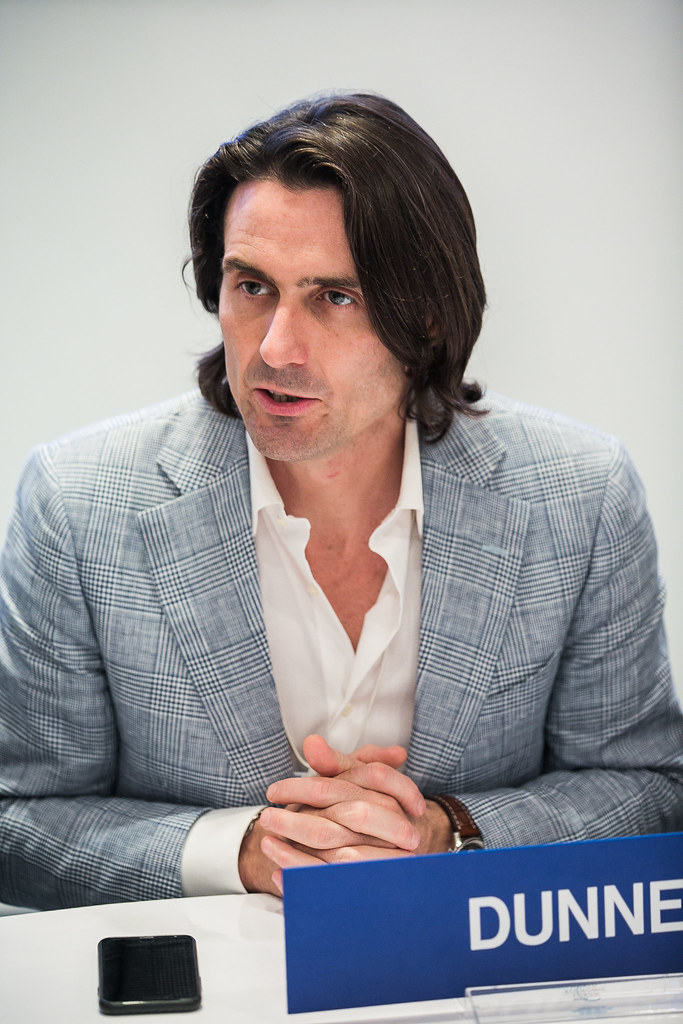
- Niall Dunne in London garden 2018
- Born: Niall Joseph Dunne; November 30, 1974 (age 51); Dublin, Republic of Ireland
- Occupation: CEO Polymateria

Niall Dunne (born 30 November 1974) is an Irish business leader and sustainability advocate. He is a former Chief Executive Officer of Polymateria, a UK-based biodegradable plastics company, and previously served as Chief Sustainability Officer at BT Group. In 2024, Dunne was appointed as an Ambassador to His Majesty King Charles III’s Sustainable Markets Initiative (SMI).

== Early life and education ==
Dunne was born in Dublin, Ireland, and attended Belvedere College. He later attended Manhattan College in New York on an athletics scholarship.

=== Early career ===
Dunne began his career in technology and communications, holding leadership roles in sustainability and innovation at companies such as Saatchi & Saatchi and Accenture.

=== BT Group ===
In 2011, Dunne was appointed Chief Sustainability Officer at BT Group, where he led the company’s environmental and corporate responsibility initiatives. He was instrumental in integrating sustainable business models into BT’s core strategy and contributed to decarbonization efforts across the telecommunications sector.

=== Polymateria ===
In 2018, Dunne became Chief Executive Officer of Polymateria, a London-based materials science company focused on creating biodegradable plastics that do not generate microplastics. Under his leadership, Polymateria raised more than £50 million in funding from investors including King Charles III’s charitable network, Indorama Ventures, Temasek, and Planet First Partners. According to The Times, the company’s valuation increased more than tenfold by the time of its Series B funding round in 2023. During his tenure, Dunne led high-profile partnerships with Taylor Swift’s global tour and Formula 1, implementing solutions to reduce plastic waste at major international events.

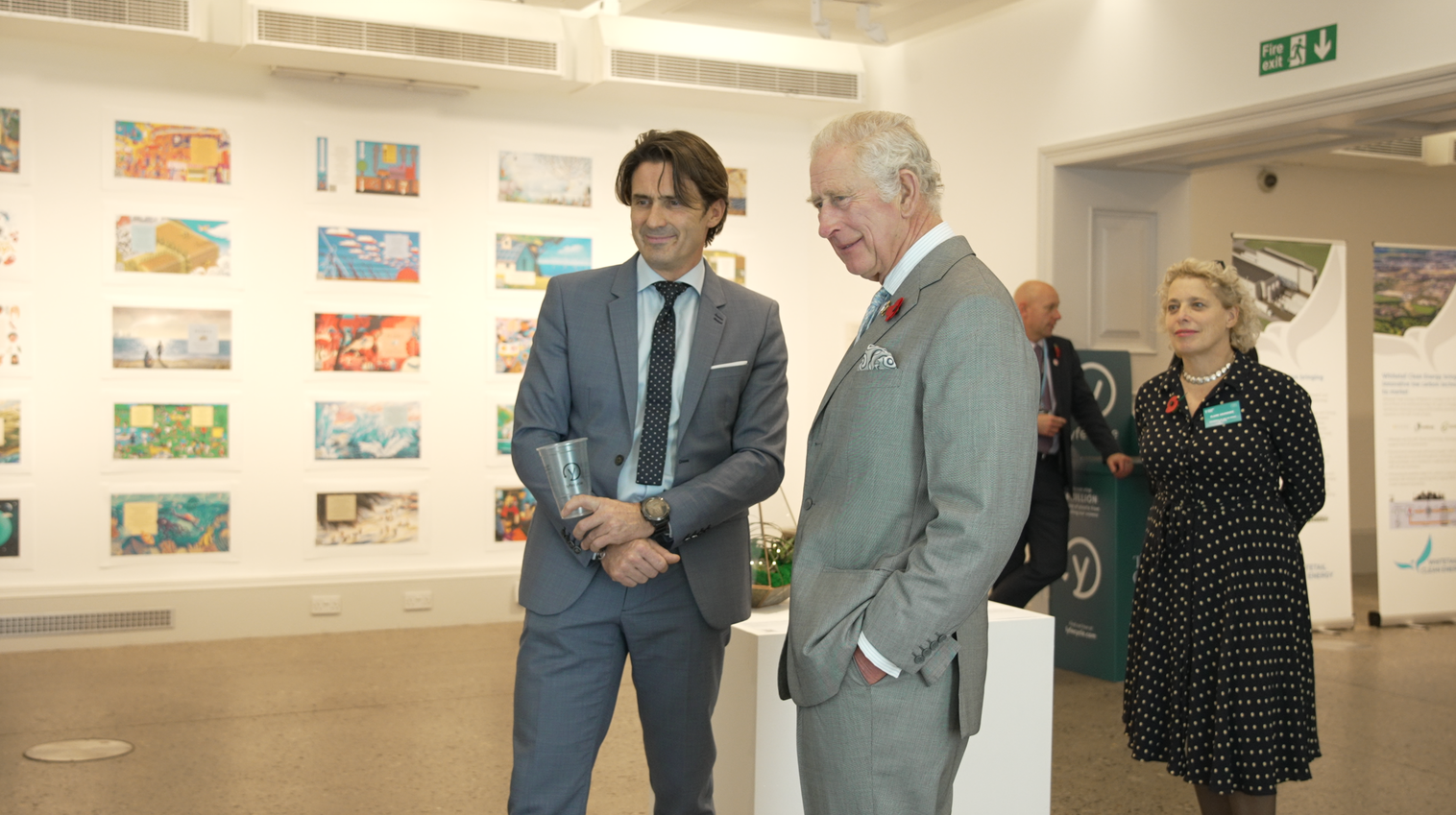
Photo of Niall Dunne

Dunne stepped down as CEO of Polymateria in late 2024.

=== Sustainable Markets Initiative ===
In 2024, Dunne was appointed as an Ambassador to the Sustainable Markets Initiative (SMI), founded by King Charles III to promote sustainable business practices and accelerate global transition toward a more resilient and inclusive economy. In this role, Dunne contributes to advancing the SMI’s broader mission on legacy, impact and long-term systems change.
