= Polybutylene adipate terephthalate =

Biodegradable copolymer, chemical compound

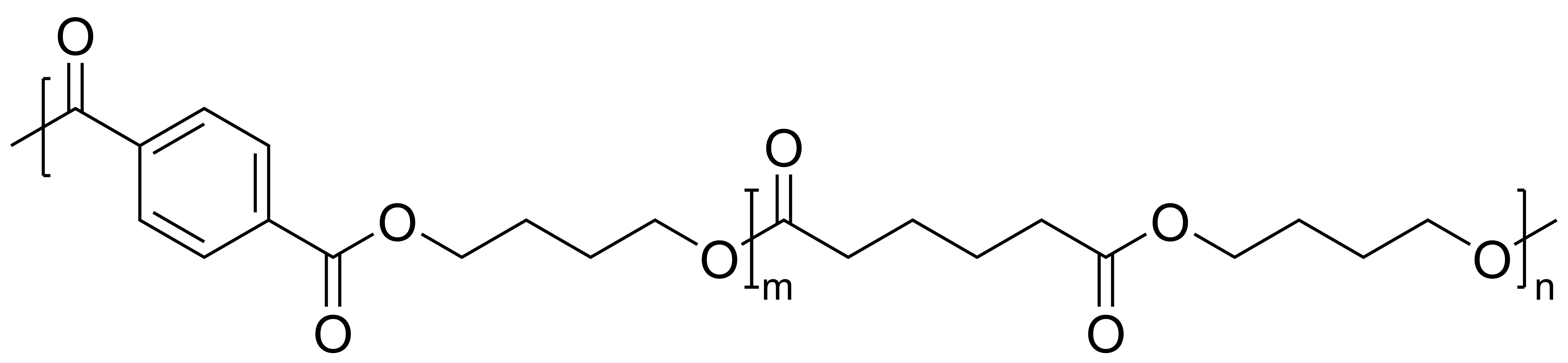

Identifiers
CAS Number	130479-65-1; 60961-73-1
- Except where otherwise noted, data are given for materials in their standard state (at 25 °C [77 °F], 100 kPa). Infobox references

PBAT (short for polybutylene adipate terephthalate) is a biodegradable random copolymer, specifically a copolyester of adipic acid, 1,4-butanediol and terephthalic acid. PBAT is produced by many different manufacturers and may be known by the brand names ecoflex, Wango, Ecoworld, Eastar Bio, and Origo-Bi. It is also called poly(butylene adipate-co-terephthalate) and sometimes polybutyrate-adipate-terephthalate (a misnomer) or even just "polybutyrate". It is generally marketed as a fully biodegradable alternative to low-density polyethylene, having many similar properties including flexibility and resilience, allowing it to be used for many similar uses such as plastic bags and wraps. The structure is a random-block polymer consisting of butanediol–adipic acid and butanediol-terephthalic acid blocks.

== History ==
Production of plastics for use in the industrial sector around the world makes up a very large market. PET (polyethylene terephthalate) is one of the dominant plastics within this market. It is commonly used for bottles because it makes a rigid container that is very lightweight. However, because of the stability of PET, it is also highly resistant to biodegradation, posing a significant environmental problem because of the amount of PET produced, sold, used and thrown away on a daily basis. An estimated 30% of the world production of PET goes into making these plastic bottles and only from 15% to 35% is recycled; the rest usually end up in a landfill. This has stimulated research into polymers that function comparably to PET, but are biodegradable.

As with all developments in the realm of materials there are several requirements for the 'ideal' material. For biodegradable plastics, they would be: cheap, renewable, easy to produce and eco-friendly. In addition to these, the polymer should be resistant enough to be functional, such as handling the strain of being put under pressure, and flexible so that it is easy to mold. There are no homopolymers that perfectly provide every one of these features. Therefore, researchers have turned their attention to copolymers: combinations of polymers that have chemical and mechanical properties that complement each other. This led to identifying poly(butylene adipate-co-terephthalate) (PBAT) as a potential copolymer for blending.

PBAT is a random copolymer known for being flexible and tough. This makes it ideal for combination with other biodegradable polymers that have high elastic modulus and strength, but are very brittle. This allows for the production of blended copolymers that can replace industry-standard plastics with environmentally safe and biodegradable plastics that will harmlessly disappear in a short period of time.

== Properties ==
PBAT is classified as a random copolymer due to its random structure. This also means that it cannot crystallize to any significant degree due to the absence of any kind of structural order. This leads to several physical properties: wide melting point, low elastic modulus and stiffness, but high flexibility and toughness. The flexibility and toughness of this polymer makes it ideal for blending with another biodegradable polymer that is strong and rigid for bottle production.

The drawback of this polymer is that if it has high flexibility and toughness, then it will not be strong and rigid. This makes it non-ideal for any situation in which a strong, rigid container is desired. An example of this would be transparent barriers, such as those made of plexiglass (Poly(methyl methacrylate)), a transparent glass substitute.

PBAT is fully biodegradable when composted due to the presence of butylene adipate groups. The high stability and mechanical properties come from the terephthalate portions.

PBAT does not degrade in marine and fresh water.

== Preparation ==
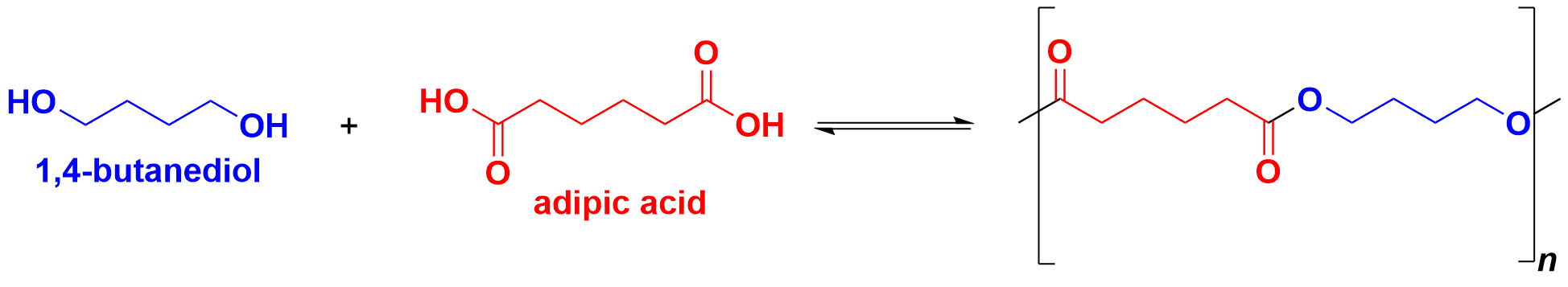
The polyester of adipic acid is synthesized using 1,4-butanediol. The chain lengths are kept low by using an excess of diol in the reaction.

PBAT is synthesized from the polymer of 1,4-butanediol and adipic acid and the polymer of dimethyl terephthalate (DMT) with 1,4-butanediol.

Adipic acid and 1,4-butanediol are polymerized to create their polyester (plus water). DMT and 1,4-butanediol are also reacted to form their polyester (plus methanol). This polyester is then added to the butylene adipic acid polyester by using tetrabutoxytitanium (TBOT) as a transesterification catalyst; an overabundance of 1,4-butanediol influences chain lengths. The result is a copolymer of the two previously prepared polymers.

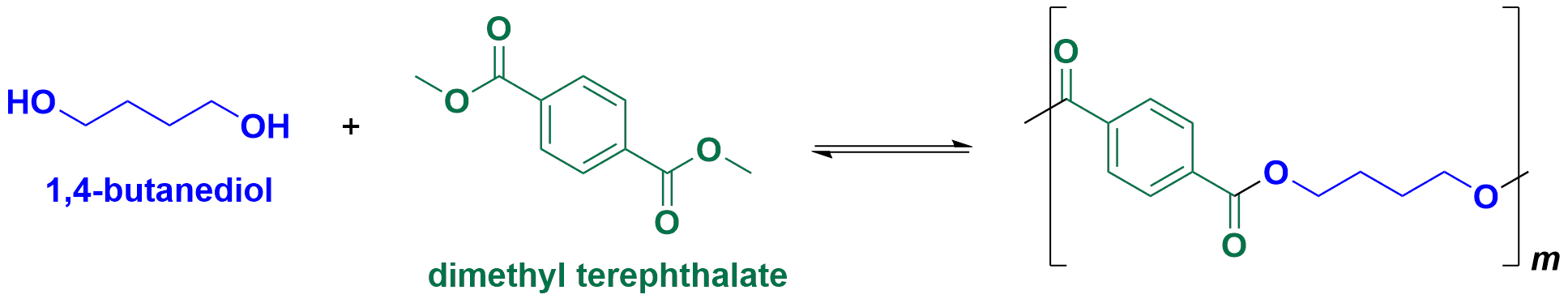
The polyester of DMT is generated using 1,4-butanediol. This is the second polymer used with the step 1 product to create the copolymer PBAT.

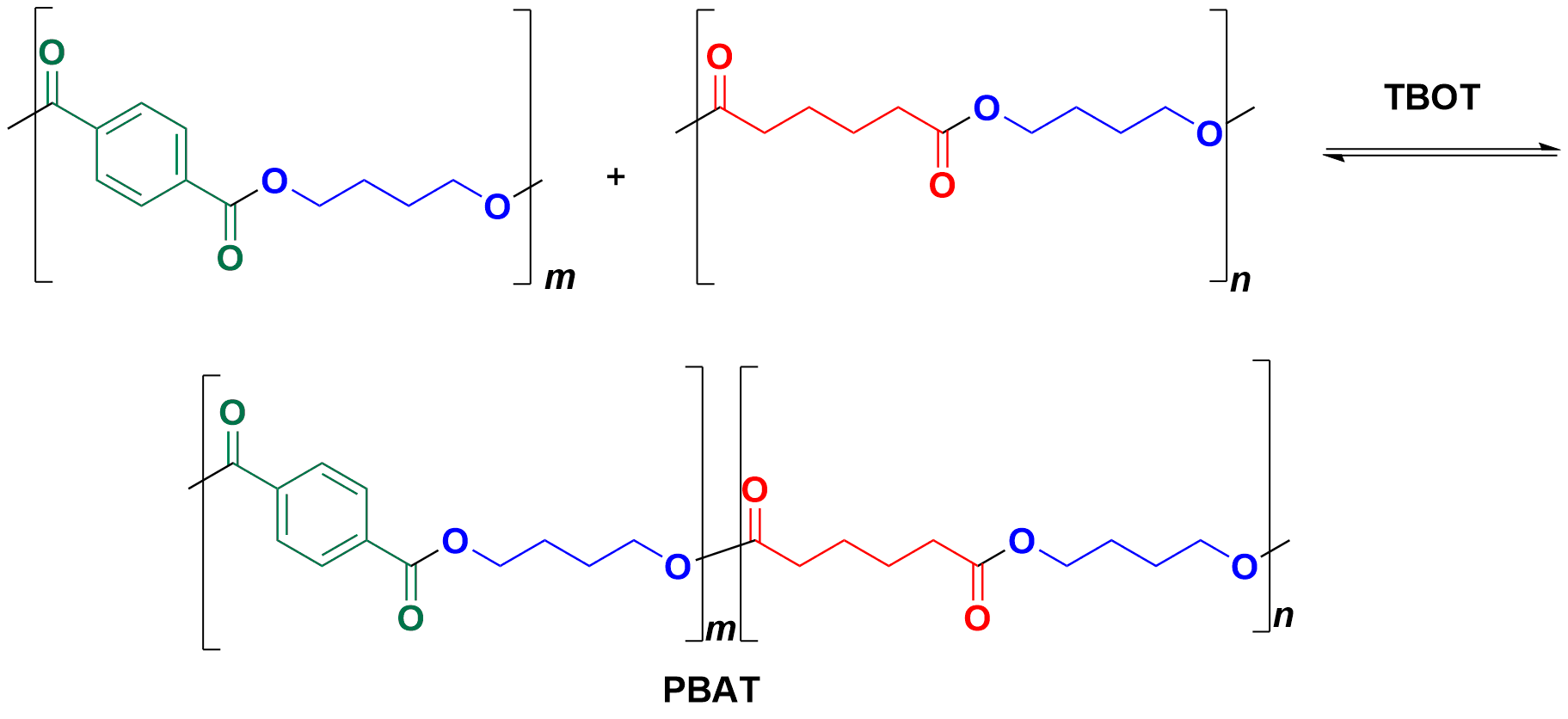
TBOT is used to catalyze the transesterification of the polyesters of adipic acid and DMT to generate the random, copolymer PBAT.

This is a random copolymer, because there is no control on the dispersity of the polymer chain lengths or block structuring in the copolymerization reactions; repeat positions are not controlled. If A = polyester of adipic acid and B = polyester of DMT, each with 1,4-butanediol, then the chain structuring could look like any of these: AABABBABA or ABABAAAABB or ABABABBBBA; there is no selectivity for A and B reacting with themselves or each other.

== Commercial sources ==
PBAT is produced commercially by BASF under the trademark ecoflex and in a blend with poly(lactic acid) called ecovio, by Novamont as Origo-Bi and in a blend with starch called Mater-Bi, by Zhuhai Wango Chemical Co Ltd under the name Wango, by JinHui Zhaolong as Ecoworld and in a blend with starch called Ecowill, and by Eastman Chemical as Eastar Bio. Furthermore, suppliers in China and other nations now produce PBAT. These companies include Zhejiang Biodegradable Advanced Material Co. Ltd, Dongguan Xinhai Environmental Protection Material Co., Ltd., Hangzhou Ruijiang Chemical Co., Ltd., and Jiangsu Torise Biomaterials Co., Ltd. in China as well as Green Chemical Co., Ltd. and WILLEAP in South Korea.

== Current and future uses ==
PBAT is marketed commercially as a biodegradable plastic, with BASF's ecoflex showing 90% degradation after 80 days in testing. Particular applications that are highlighted by the manufacturers include cling wrap for food packaging, compostable plastic bags for gardening and agricultural use, and as water resistant coatings for other materials, such as in paper-based products. Due to its high flexibility and biodegradable nature, PBAT is also marketed as an additive for more rigid biodegradable plastics to impart flexibility while maintaining biodegradability of the final blend.

PBAT is already widely marketed and used for all of the above applications, but is also being investigated as a component in antimicrobial films. In such films, PBAT serves as the bulk of the film with the antimicrobial agent being incorporated during processing. The antimicrobial films would be used in food packaging to inhibit bacterial growth, helping to preserve food products safely.
