= List of woodcuts by Albrecht Dürer =

The following is a list of woodcuts by the German painter and engraver Albrecht Dürer.

== Art catalogs ==
One of the earliest list of woodcuts by Dürer was assembled in 1808 by Adam Bartsch in his "Le Peintre Graveur" volume 7 and in the appendix. In 1862 Johann David Passavant expanded "Le Peintre Graveur" adding additional woodcuts. Bartsch and Passavant works, which were organized alphabetically, are the source of "B." and "P." numbers, referenced by all the later books. Another often cited reference is 1903 "Catalogue of Early German and Flemish Woodcuts in the British Museum, Vol. 1" by Campbell Dodgson organized by date and often referenced using "C. D." numbers. In the list below numbers used in 1938 "Albrecht Dürer: Complete woodcuts" (German: Albrecht Dürer: Sämtliche Holzschnitte) by Otto Fischer were provided, as this book offers a catalog of most Dürer woodcuts printed in the original size.

== List of woodcuts ==
Authorship of many woodcuts is uncertain, with different sources disagreeing if the woodcut was made by Dürer alone, with help of one of his students, or by one of his students with or without Dürer supervision. For some prints we also have only copies from late printings, which could be by Dürer or a copy of a lost print by him. The prints with uncertain authorship will be marked by a note below the title. The list below contains great majority of the prints which were included in one of the Dürer's catalogue raisonné indicated, even if the source was not certain of the authorship or considered it to be work of School of Dürer. The list below includes some woodcut illustrations from books by Dürer, but many more were omitted or included in latter sections.

Image	Title (Comments)	Catalogue raisonné				Year	Series or Book	Other references
Image	Title (Comments)	Kurth	Bartsch & Passavant	Dodgson	Fischer	Year	Series or Book	Other references
	Saint Jerome	22	P. 246	C. D. 1	1	1492		
	Christ on the Cross Between the Virgin and Saint John (uncertain authorship)	85			285	1493		
	Lamentation for the Dead Christ (uncertain authorship)	87			342	1495		
	Crucifixion (uncertain authorship)	88			343	1495		
	Martyrdom of St Sebastian (uncertain authorship)	90	P. 182	C. D. 2	345	c. 1495		
	St. Christopher Crossing the Stream (uncertain authorship)	91	B. 105		346	1528		
	Syphilitic Man (uncertain authorship)	92			287	1496		
	Christ Crowned with Thorns (uncertain authorship)	94			289	c. 1500	Albertina Passion	
	Flagellation of Christ (uncertain authorship)	95			290	c. 1494	Albertina Passion	
	Christ bearing the cross (uncertain authorship)	96			291	c. 1494	Albertina Passion	
	Christ on the cross (uncertain authorship)	97			292	c. 1494	Albertina Passion	
	The Martyrdom of the Ten Thousand	98	B. 117	C. D. 3	2	c. 1496-1497		
	Hercules	99	B. 127	C. D. 5	3	c. 1496		
	The Knight and the Landsknecht	100	B. 131	C. D. 6	4	c. 1496-1497		
	The Men's Bath	101	B. 128	C. D. 4	5	between 1496 and 1497		
	The Martyrdom of St Catherine	102	B. 120	C. D. 7	6	c. 1497-1499		
	Samson Killing the Lion	103	B. 2	C. D. 8	7	c. 1497-1498		
	The Holy Family with the Three Hares	104	B. 102	C. D. 9	8	c. 1497-1498		
	Die heimlich offenbarung iohnis	105			9	between 1497 and 1498	Apocalypse	
	Apocalipsis cum figuris					1498	Apocalypse	
	The Martyrdom of St John	106	B. 61	C. D. 10	10	c. 1496-1498	Apocalypse	
	Saint John's vision of the seven candlesticks	107	B. 62		11	c. 1496-1498	Apocalypse	
	Saint John kneeling before Christ and the Twenty-Four Elders	108	B. 63		12	c. 1496-1498	Apocalypse	
	The four horsemen of the Apocalypse	109	B. 64	C. D. 11	13	c. 1496-1498	Apocalypse	
	The Opening of the fifth and sixth seals	110	B. 65		14	c. 1496-1498	Apocalypse	
	Four angels holding back the winds, and the marking of the elect	111	B. 66		15	c. 1496-1498	Apocalypse	
	The Opening of the seventh seal and the eagle crying 'Woe'	112	B. 68		16	c. 1496-1498	Apocalypse	
	The four angels of Death	113	B. 69		17	c. 1496-1498	Apocalypse	
	Saint John eating the book	114	B. 70		18	c. 1496-1498	Apocalypse	
	The woman of the Apocalypse and the seven-headed dragon	115	B. 71		19	c. 1496-1498	Apocalypse	
	Saint Michael Fighting the Dragon	116	B. 72		20	c. 1496-1498	Apocalypse	
	The Beast with the lamb's horns and the beast with seven heads	117	B. 74	C. D. 13	21	c. 1496-1498	Apocalypse	
	The hymn in adoration of the lamb	118	B. 67		22	c. 1496-1498	Apocalypse	
	The Whore of Babylon	119	B. 73	C. D. 12	23	c. 1496-1498	Apocalypse	
	The Angel with the key of the bottomless pit	120	B. 75	C. D. 14	24	c. 1496-1498	Apocalypse	
	Christ on the mount of olives	121	B. 6	C. D. 15	25	c. 1497-1500	Great Passion	
	Flagellation of Christ	122	B. 8	C. D. 16	26	c. 1497	Great Passion	
	Ecce Homo	123	B. 9	C. D. 17	27	between 1498 and 1499	Great Passion	
	Christ bearing the cross	124	B. 10	C. D. 18	28	c. 1498-1499	Great Passion	
	The Crucifixion	125	B. 11	C. D. 19	29	c. 1497-1498	Great Passion	
	The Lamentation for Christ	126	B. 12	C. D. 20	30	c. 1498-1499	Great Passion	
	The Entombment	127	B. 13	C. D. 21	31	c. 1497	Great Passion	
	Illustration to Revelationes Sancte Birgitte (uncertain authorship)	139			305	1500		
	Conrad Celtes presenting the book by Hrotsvitha to Friedrich III of Saxony	143	P. 277	C. D. 23	32	1501		
	Hrotsvitha Presenting Her Book to the Emperor Otto I	144	P. 277		33	1501		
	Conrad Celtis Presenting His Book "Quatuor Libri Amorum" to Maximilian I	145	B. 130P. 217		36	1502		
	Philosophia	146	B. 130P. 217	C. D. 24	37	probably 1502		
	Saint Sebaldus standing on a column	169	B. 20 (Appendice)	C. D. 22	34	c. 1501		
	Ex libris of Willibald Pirckheimer	170	B. 52 (Appendice)	C. D. 25	38			
	Astronomer (uncertain authorship)	171			331	1504		
	Nude Woman with the Zodiac (uncertain authorship)	172			330	1500s		
	Refusal of Joachim's Offer	175	B. 77	C. D. 37	44	c. 1504-1505	Life of the Virgin	
	The Angel Appearing to Joachim	176	B. 78	C. D. 38	45	c. 1504	Life of the Virgin	
	Joachim and Anne Meeting at the Golden Gate	177	B. 79	C. D. 39	46	1504	Life of the Virgin	
	The Birth of the Virgin	178	B. 80	C. D. 40	47	c. 1503-1504	Life of the Virgin	
	The Presentation of the Virgin in the Temple	179	B. 81	C. D. 41	48	c. 1502-1503	Life of the Virgin	
	Marriage of the Virgin	180	B. 82	C. D. 42	49	c. 1504-1505	Life of the Virgin	
	The Annunciation	181	B. 83	C. D. 43	50	c. 1502-1504	Life of the Virgin	
	The Visitation	182	B. 84	C. D. 44	51	c. 1504	Life of the Virgin	
	The Nativity	183	B. 85	C. D. 45	52	c. 1502-1504	Life of the Virgin	
	The Circumcision of Christ	184	B. 86	C. D. 46	53	c. 1504-1505	Life of the Virgin	
	The Adoration of the Magi	185	B. 87	C. D. 47	54	c. 1501-1503	Life of the Virgin	
	The Presentation of Christ in the Temple	186	B. 88	C. D. 48	55	c. 1504-1505	Life of the Virgin	
	The Flight into Egypt	187	B. 89	C. D. 49	56	c. 1504	Life of the Virgin	
	The Rest during the Flight to Egypt	188	B. 90	C. D. 50	57	c. 1504	Life of the Virgin	
	Christ among the Doctors in the Temple	189	B. 91	C. D. 51	58	c. 1503-1504	Life of the Virgin	
	Christ Taking Leave of his Mother	190	B. 92	C. D. 52	59	c. 1504-1505	Life of the Virgin	
	The Virgin Worshipped by Angels and Saints	191	B. 95	C. D. 53	60	c. 1504	Life of the Virgin	
	Calvary with the Three Crosses	192	B. 59	C. D. 26	40	c. 1504-1505		
	The Holy Family with Two Angels in a Vaulted Hall	193	B. 100	C. D. 27	35	c. 1504		
	Saint Christopher	194	B. 104	C. D. 32	39	c. 1503-1504		
	Saint Francis Receiving the Stigmata	195	B. 110	C. D. 33	41	from 1503 until 1504		
	Saint John and Saint Onuphrius	196	B. 112	C. D. 30	42	c. 1504		
	The Hermits St Anthony and St Paul	197	B. 107	C. D. 31	43	c. 1504		
	Saint George Killing the Dragon	198	B. 111	C. D. 36	61	between 1501 and 1504		
	The Elevation of Saint Mary Magdalene	199	B. 121	C. D. 29	62	c. 1504-1505		
	The Holy Family with Five Angels	200	B. 99	C. D. 28	63	1500s		
	Saints Stephen, Sixtus and Lawrence	201	B. 108	C. D. 34	64	c. 1504-1505		
	Saints Nicholas, Ulrich and Erasmus	202	B. 118	C. D. 35	65	1500s		
	The First Knot	203	B. 140	C. D. 54	66	probably between 1506 and 1507	Six knots	
	The Second Knot		B. 141	C. D. 55		probably between 1506 and 1507	Six knots	
	The Third Knot		B. 142	C. D. 56		probably between 1506 and 1507	Six knots	
	The Fourth Knot	204	B. 143	C. D. 57	67	probably between 1506 and 1507	Six knots	
	The Fifth Knot	205	B. 144	C. D. 58	68	probably between 1506 and 1507	Six knots	
	The Sixth Knot	206	B. 145	C. D. 59	69	probably between 1506 and 1507	Six knots	
	Coat of arms of Michel Beheim	207	B. 159	C. D. 101	70	c. 1520		
	Crest of the Scheurl and Tucher families (uncertain authorship)		P. 214	C. D. 42		1512		
	Job in his sickness being scourged by the devil (uncertain authorship)		B. 2 (Appendice) / P. 222	C. D. 348.1		1509		
	Christ on the Cross with the Virgin and St John	208	B. 55	C. D. 97	72	1510		
	Schoolmaster	209	B. 133	C. D. 99	71	1510		
	Death and the Lansquenet	210	B. 132	C. D. 98	73	1510		
	King David does repentance	211	B. 119	C. D. 100	74	1510		
	The Beheading of St John the Baptist	212	B. 125	C. D. 108	75	1510		
	Revelation of Saint John	213	B. 60	C. D. 113	77	between 1510 and 1511	Apocalypse	
	The Man of Sorrows Mocked by a Soldier	214	B. 4	C. D. 112	78	probably 1511	Great Passion	
	Last Supper	215	B. 5	C. D. 102	79	1510	Great Passion	
	Christ taken captive	216	B. 7	C. D. 103	80	1510	Great Passion	
	Christ in Limbo	217	B. 14	C. D. 104	81	1510	Great Passion	
	The Resurrection of Christ	218	B. 15	C. D. 105	82	1510	Great Passion	
	The Madonna on the Crescent	219	B. 76	C. D. 111	83	between 1510 and 1511	Life of the Virgin	
	The Death of the Virgin	220	B. 93	C. D. 106	84	1510	Life of the Virgin	
	The Coronation of the Virgin	221	B. 94	C. D. 107	85	1510	Life of the Virgin	
	Frontispice	222	B. 16	C. D. 110	86	1511	Small Passion	
	The Fall of Man	223	B. 17	C. D. 61	88	c. 1509-1510	Small Passion	
	Expulsion from the Paradise	224	B. 18	C. D. 62	87	1510	Small Passion	
	The Annunciation	225	B. 19	C. D. 63	89	c. 1509-1510	Small Passion	
	The Nativity	226	B. 20	C. D. 64	90	c. 1509-1510	Small Passion	
	Christ taking leave of his mother	227	B. 21	C. D. 65	91	c. 1509-1510	Small Passion	
	Christ's entry into Jerusalem	228	B. 22	C. D. 66	92	c. 1509-1510	Small Passion	
	Christ driving the merchants from the Temple	229	B. 23	C. D. 67	93	c. 1509-1510	Small Passion	
	The Last Supper	230	B. 24	C. D. 68	94	c. 1509-1510	Small Passion	
	Christ washing Peter's feet	231	B. 25	C. D. 69	95	c. 1509-1510	Small Passion	
	Christ on the mount of olives	232	B. 26	C. D. 70	96	c. 1509-1510	Small Passion	
	Christ taken captive	233	B. 27	C. D. 71	97	c. 1509-1510	Small Passion	
	Christ before Annas	234	B. 28	C. D. 72	98	c. 1509-1510	Small Passion	
	Christ before Caiaphas	235	B. 29	C. D. 73	99	c. 1509-1510	Small Passion	
	The Mocking of Christ	236	B. 30	C. D. 74	100	c. 1509-1510	Small Passion	
	Christ before Pilate	237	B. 31	C. D. 75	101	c. 1509-1510	Small Passion	
	Christ before Herod	238	B. 32	C. D. 76	102	1509	Small Passion	
	The Flagellation	239	B. 33	C. D. 77	103	c. 1509-1510	Small Passion	
	Christ being crowned with thorns	240	B. 34	C. D. 78	104	c. 1509-1510	Small Passion	
	Christ shown to the people	241	B. 35	C. D. 79	105	c. 1509-1510	Small Passion	
	Pilate washing his hands	242	B. 36	C. D. 80	106	c. 1509-1510	Small Passion	
	Christ bearing the Cross	243	B. 37	C. D. 81	107	1509	Small Passion	
	The Sudarium of St Veronica	244	B. 38	C. D. 82	108	1509	Small Passion	
	Christ being nailed to the Cross	245	B. 39	C. D. 83	109	c. 1509-1510	Small Passion	
	Christ on the Cross	246	B. 40	C. D. 84	110	c. 1509-1510	Small Passion	
	Christ in Limbo	247	B. 41	C. D. 85	111	c. 1509-1510	Small Passion	
	The Descent from the Cross	248	B. 42	C. D. 86	112	c. 1509-1510	Small Passion	
	The Lamentation for Christ	249	B. 43	C. D. 87	113	c. 1509-1510	Small Passion	
	The Entombment	250	B. 44	C. D. 88	114	c. 1509-1510	Small Passion	
	The Resurrection	251	B. 45	C. D. 89	115	c. 1509-1510	Small Passion	
	Christ appears to his mother	252	B. 46	C. D. 90	116	c. 1509-1510	Small Passion	
	Christ appears to Mary Magdalene	253	B. 47	C. D. 91	117	c. 1509-1510	Small Passion	
	Christ and the disciples at Emmaus	254	B. 48	C. D. 92	118	c. 1509-1510	Small Passion	
	The Incredulity of St Thomas	255	B. 49	C. D. 93	119	c. 1509-1510	Small Passion	
	The Ascension	256	B. 50	C. D. 94	120	c. 1509-1510	Small Passion	
	The Descent of the Holy Spirit	257	B. 51	C. D. 95	121	c. 1509-1510	Small Passion	
	The Last Judgment	258	B. 52	C. D. 96	122	c. 1509-1510	Small Passion	
	Christ on the Mount of Olives	259	B. 54	C. D. 60	123	c. 1509-1510		
	Herod with the head of the Baptist	260	B. 126	C. D. 109	76	1511		
	Cain Killing Abel	261	B. 1	C. D. 114	124	1511		
	The Adoration of the Magi	262	B. 3	C. D. 115	125	1511		
	The Mass of Saint Gregory	263	B. 123	C. D. 117	126	1511		
	The Trinity	264	B. 122	C. D. 116	127	1511		
	Saint Christopher	265	B. 103	C. D. 121	128	1511		
	Saint Jerome in His Cell	266	B. 114	C. D. 118	129	1511		
	The Holy Family with Joachim and Anne under a Tree	267	B. 96	C. D. 119	130	1511		
	The Holy Family with Two Music-Making Angels	268	B. 97	C. D. 120	131	1511		
	Saint Jerome in a Cave	269	B. 113	C. D. 122	132	1512		
	Border with Putti Holding the Pirckheimer Arms	270	P. 205		133	probably 1513		
	Border - with The Baptism of Christ (uncertain authorship)		B. 30 (Appendice)	C. D. 11		before 1517		
	The Virgin Crowned by Two Angels above a Landscape	271	P. 177		134	c. 1515		
	Triumphal Arch	273	B. 138	C. D. 130	135-154	1515	Triumphal Procession	
	Upper part of the middle gateway of the Triumphal Arch	274				1515	Triumphal Arch	
	Pedestal of the right hand middle column of the Triumphal Arch	276				1515	Triumphal Arch	
	Base of the right hand middle column of the Triumphal Arch	277				1515	Triumphal Arch	
	Continuation of the base of the right hand middle column of the Triumphal Arch	279			141	1515	Triumphal Arch	
	Base of the right hand corner column of the Triumphal Arch	281			143	1515	Triumphal Arch	
	Inscription tablet with the stag's skin from the uppermost section of the right wing of the Triumphal Arch	284			146	1515	Triumphal Arch	
	Griffin at the uppermost section of the right hand corner column of the Triumphal Arch	286			148	1515	Triumphal Arch	
	The Betrothal of Maximilian with Mary of Burgundy	287			151	1515	Triumphal Arch	
	The Betrothal of Philip the Fair with Joan of Castile	288			149	1515	Triumphal Arch	
	Printed text for "The Betrothal of Philip the Fair with Joan of Castile"					1515	Triumphal Arch	
	The Betrothal of Maximilian with Mary of Burgundy					1515	Triumphal Arch	
	Printed text for "The Betrothal of Maximilian with Mary of Burgundy"					1515	Triumphal Arch	
	The Vienna double wedding	289			150	1515	Triumphal Arch	
	The meeting after the Battle of the Spurs	290			152	1515	Triumphal Arch	
	The sacred coat of Tier	291			153	1515	Triumphal Arch	
	Fourth set of the Busts of Emperors of the Triumphal Arch	292			154	1515	Triumphal Arch	
	The Austrian Saints (uncertain authorship)	293	B. 116	C. D. 129	335	1515		
	Johann Stabius as the Holy Coloman	294	B. 106		155	1513		
	The Northern Hemisphere of the Celestial Globe	295	B. 151	C. D. 127	156	1515		
	The Southern Hemisphere of the Celestial Globe	296	B. 152	C. D. 128	157	1515		
	The Stabius World Map	297-298	P. 201	C. D. 126	158-159	1515		
	The Stabius World Map (left)	297	P. 201	C. D. 126	158	1515	The Stabius World Map	
	The Stabius World Map (right)	298	P. 201	C. D. 126	159	1515	The Stabius World Map	
	Rhinoceros	299	B. 136	C. D. 125	160	1515		
	The owl in fight with other birds (uncertain authorship)	300			336			
	Virgin with Carthusian monks (uncertain authorship)	301	P. 180	C. D. 124		1515		
	Christ on the Cross	302	B. 56	C. D. 138	161	1516		
	Exlibris of Hieronymus Ebner	303	B. 45 (Appendice)	C. D. 137	162	1516		
	The Great Column		B. 129			1517		
	The "Scharfrennen"		P. 288	C. D. 131		1526		
	The "Anzogen-Rennen"	304	B. 36 (Appendice)P. 289	C. D. 132	163	1526		
	Italian Joust of Peace Between Jacob de Heere and Freydal, Woodcut for Freydal	305	P. 290	C. D. 133	164	probably 1526		
	Masquerade Dance with Torches	306	B. 38 (Appendice)P. 292	C. D. 135	165	probably 1516		
	The Virgin Surrounded by Many Angels	307	B. 101	C. D. 139	166	1518		
	Saint Sebald in the Niche	308	B. 21 (Appendice)		167	1518		
	The Small Triumphal Car or the Burgundian Marriage	309-311	B. 229	C. D. 136	168-170	1510s	Triumphal Procession	
	The Small Triumphal Car or the Burgundian Marriage (left part)	309	B. 229		168	1510s	The Small Triumphal Car	
	The Small Triumphal Car or the Burgundian Marriage (right part)	311	B. 229		170	1510s	The Small Triumphal Car	
	The Triumphal Chariot of Maximilian I	312-317	B. 139	C. D. 145	171-176	1523	Triumphal Procession	
	The Triumphal Chariot of Maximilian I (The Great Triumphal Car) [plate 1 of 8]	312	B. 139		171	1523		
	The Triumphal Chariot of Maximilian I (The Great Triumphal Car) [plate 2 of 8]	314	B. 139		173	1523		
	The Triumphal Chariot of Maximilian I (The Great Triumphal Car) [plate 3 of 8]	315	B. 139		174	1523		
	The Triumphal Chariot of Maximilian I (The Great Triumphal Car) [plate 7 of 8]	316	B. 139		175	1523		
	The Triumphal Chariot of Maximilian I (The Great Triumphal Car) [plate 4 of 8]		B. 139			1523		
	The Triumphal Chariot of Maximilian I (The Great Triumphal Car) [plate 5 of 8]		B. 139			1523		
	The Triumphal Chariot of Maximilian I (The Great Triumphal Car) [plate 6 of 8]		B. 139			1523		
	The Triumphal Chariot of Maximilian I (The Great Triumphal Car) [plate 8 of 8]	317	B. 139		176	1523		
	Emperor Maximilian I	318	B. 154	C. D. 140	177	c. 1518		
	Emperor Maximilian I (uncertain authorship)		B. 153	C. D. 141		1519		
	Coat of arms of von Rogendorff	319			178	1520		
	Coat of arms of Laurenz Staiber	320	B. 167		179	probably between 1520 and 1521		
	Coat of arms with Three Lions' Heads	321	B. 169		180	c. 1520		
	Coat of arms of Johann Stabius	322	B. 166		181	1510s		
	Coat of arms of Johann Tscherte	323	B. 170	C. D. 143	182	1520s		
	Coat of arms of Don Pedro Lasso de Castilla	324	P. 216		183	c. 1521		
	Coat of arms of the German Empire and Nuremberg City	325	B. 162	C. D. 144	184	1521		
	Ulrich Varnbuler	326	B. 155	C. D. 146	185	1522		
	Coat of arms of the House of Dürer	327	B. 160	C. D. 147	186	1523		
	The Last Supper	328	B. 53	C. D. 148	187	1523		
	Christ on the Cross with Three Angels	329	B. 58		188	1523		
	Time and a Fox Turning the Wheel of Fortune with People of all Ranks to the Right (uncertain authorship)	331	B. 34 (Appendice)	C. D. 149	338	probably 1526		
	Justice, Truth and Reason in the Stocks with the Seated Judge and Sleeping Piety (uncertain authorship)	332	B. 34 (Appendice)	C. D. 149	339	probably 1526		
	The Teacher, the Clergyman, and Providence (uncertain authorship)		B. 34 (Appendice)	C. D. 149		probably 1526		
	The Armillary Sphere	333	P. 202		190	1525		
	Monument to Commemorate a Victory	334			191	1525		
	Monument to a Dead Drunkard	335			192	1525		
	Monument to the Vanquished Peasants	336			193	1525		
	Man painting a portrait	337	B. 146	C. D. 150	194	1525		
	Man drawing a lute	338	B. 147	C. D. 151	195	1525		
	Draughtsman drawing a vase	339	B. 148	C. D. 152	196	1525		
	Draughtsman Drawing a Recumbent Woman	340	B. 149	C. D. 153	197	1525		
	The Holy Family on a Grassy Bench (uncertain authorship)	341	B. 98	C. D. 154	340	1526		
	Helius Eobanus Hessus (uncertain authorship)	342			341	1526		
	The Arms of Ferdinand I, King of Hungary and Bohemia	343	P. 210	C. D. 155	198	1527		
	Siege of a Fortress	344-345	B. 137	C. D. 156	199-200	1527		
	Siege of a Fortress: Left Portion	344	B. 137	C. D. 156	199	1527	Siege of a Fortress	
	Siege of a Fortress: Right Portion	345	B. 137	C. D. 156	200	1527	Siege of a Fortress	
	Saint Jerome		B. 115			between 1500 and 1515		

== Illustrations from Books ==
=== Ritter von Turn (1493) ===
Set of 45 illustrations from "Ritter von Turn" or "The Book of the Knight of the Tower" published in 1493, which are attributed to Dürer.

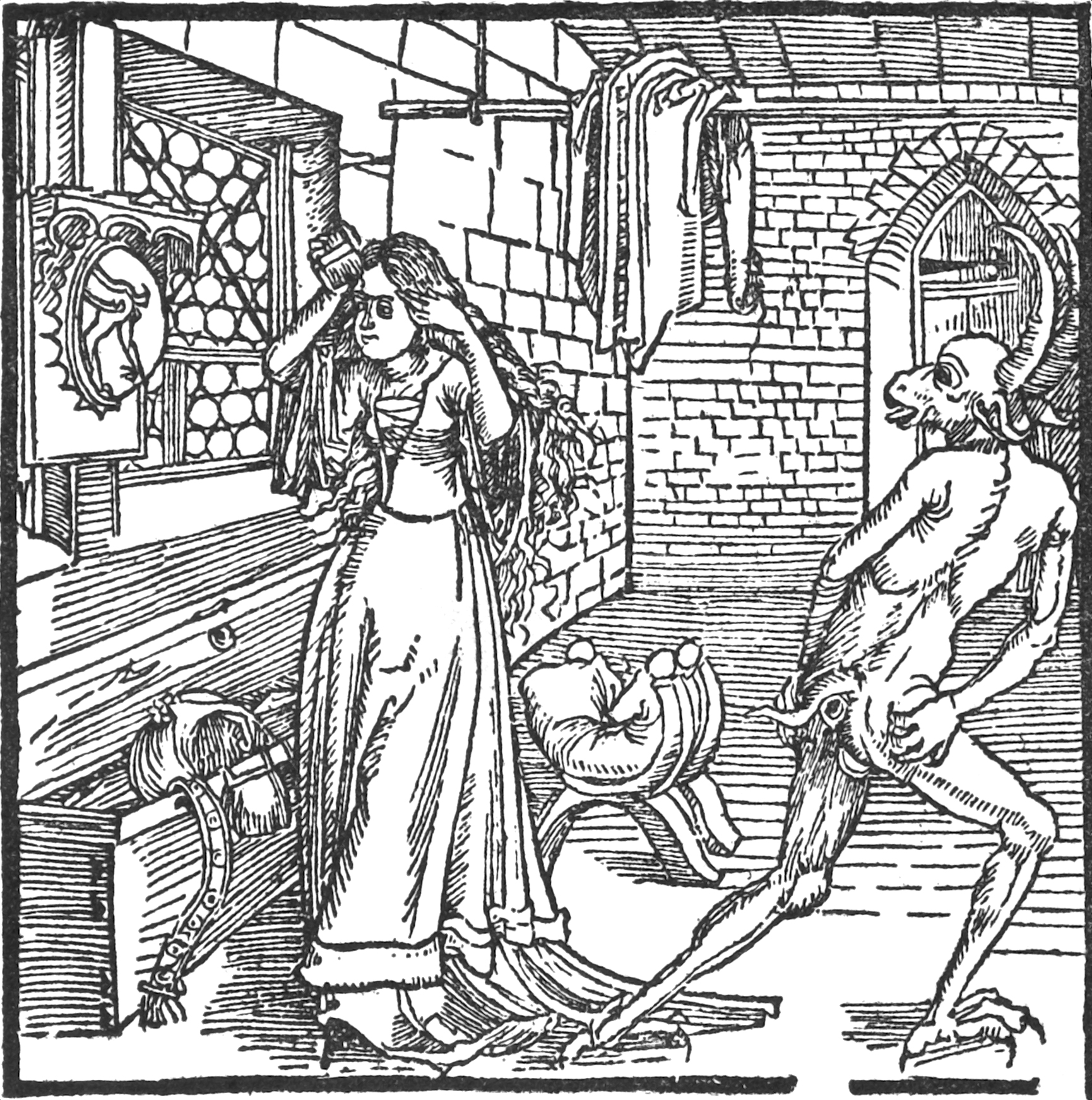

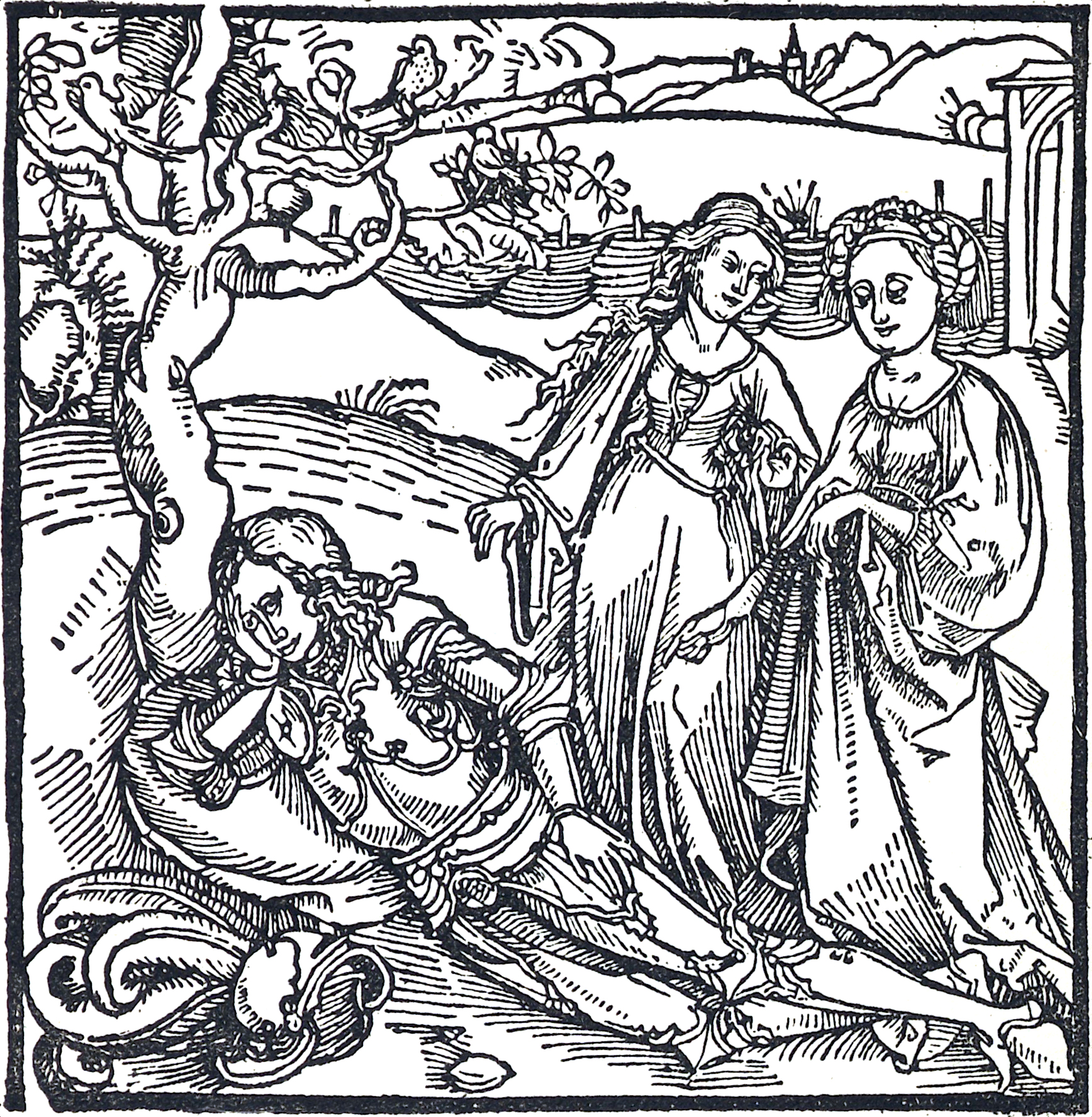

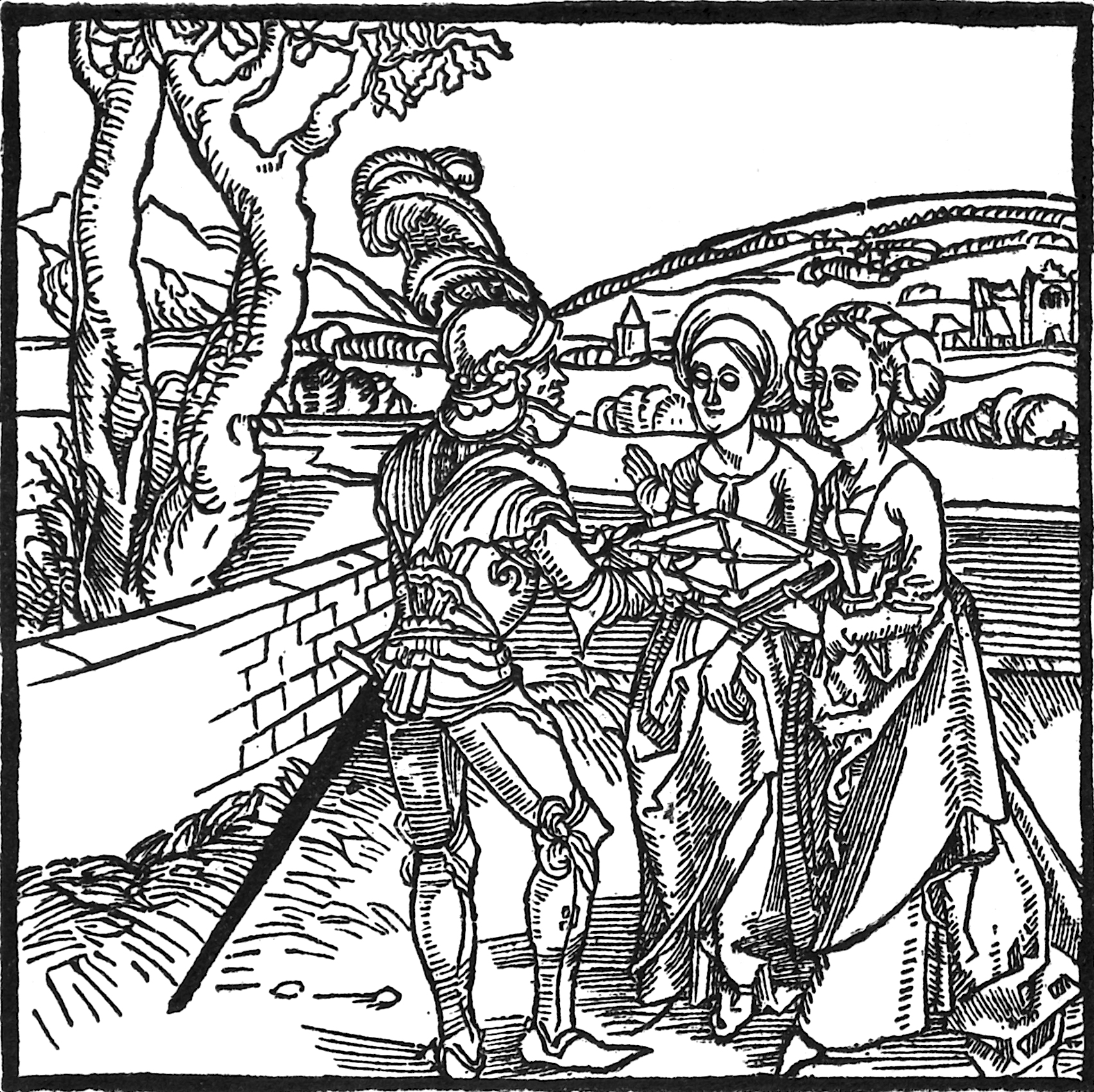

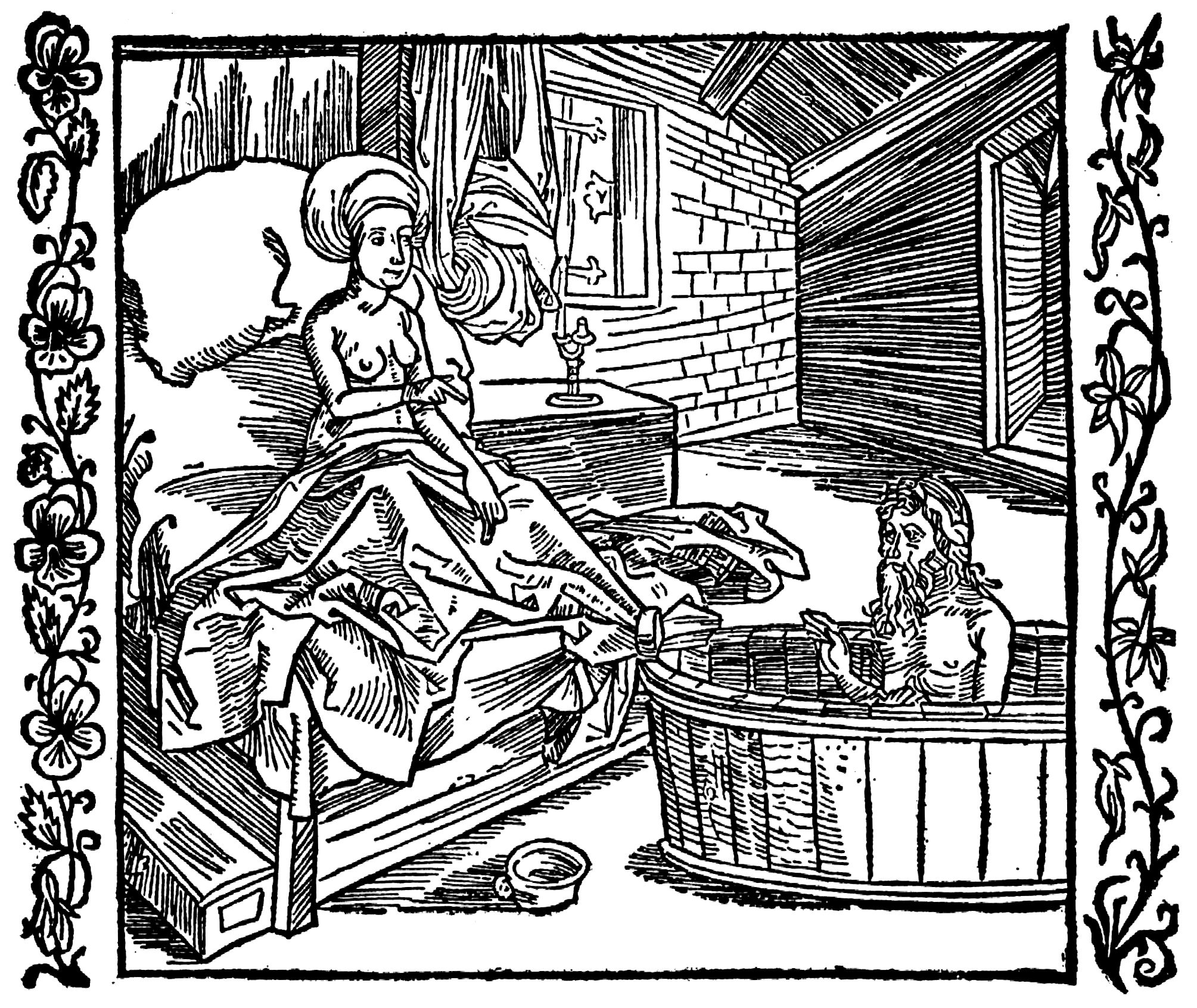

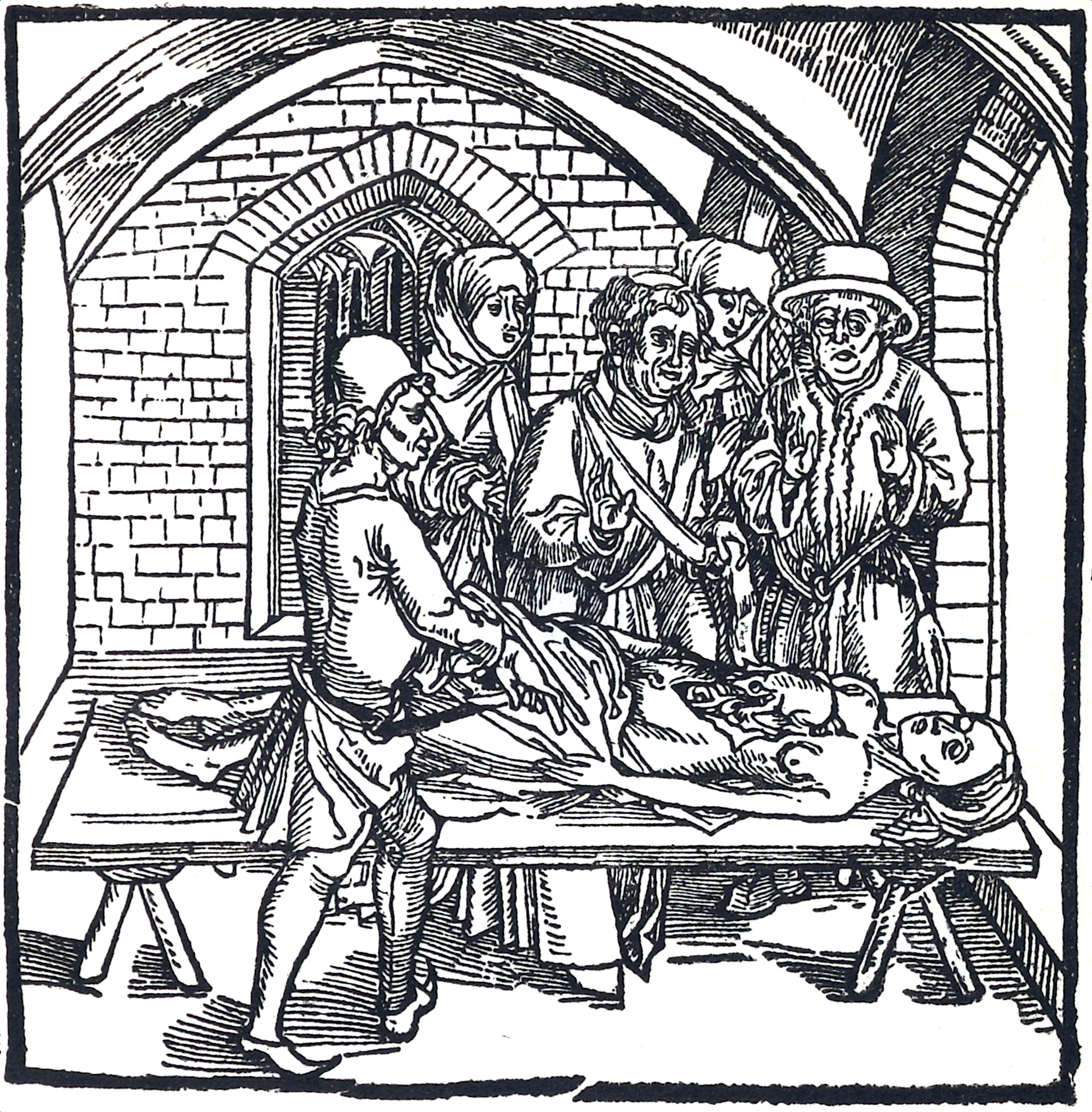

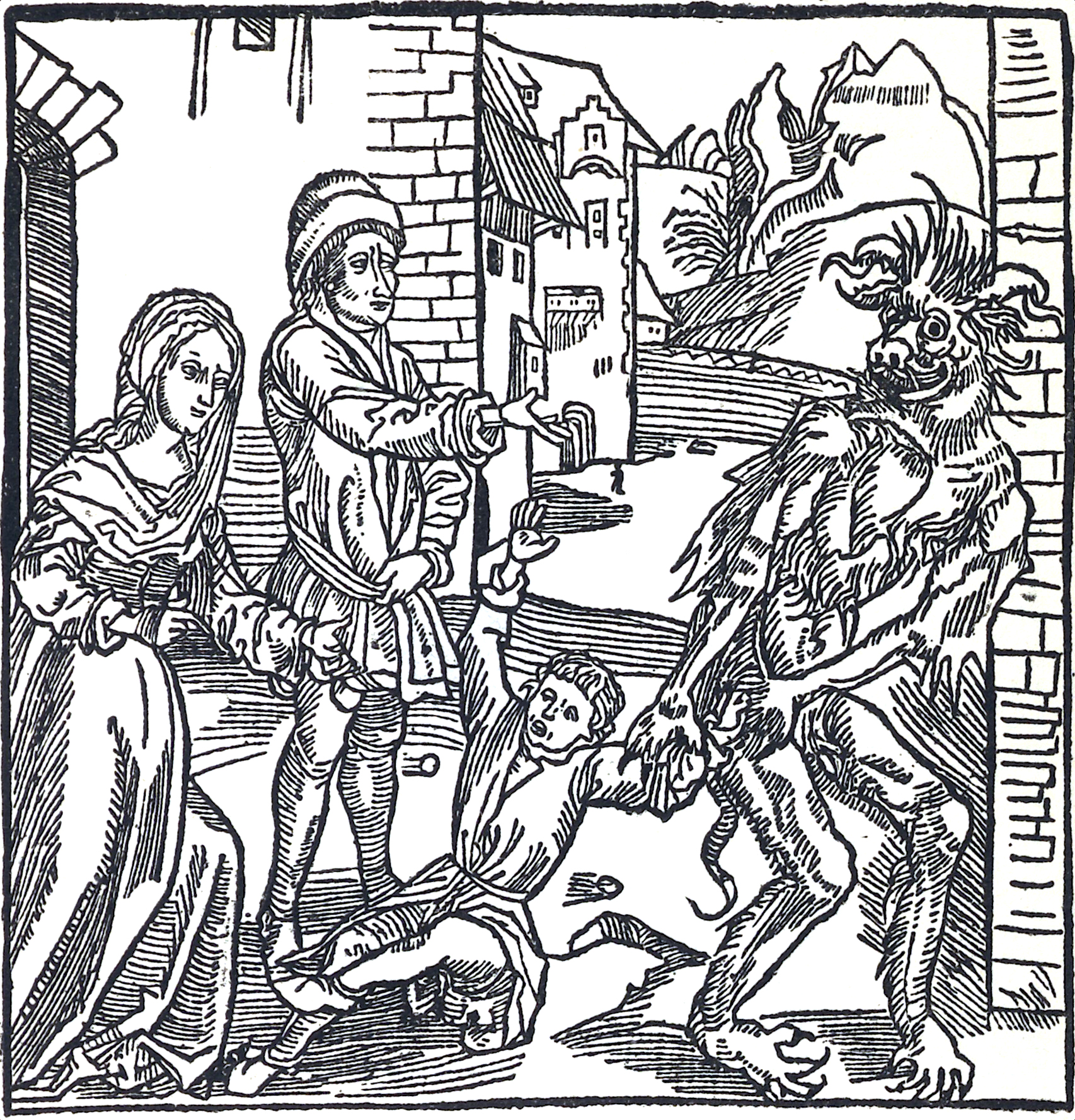

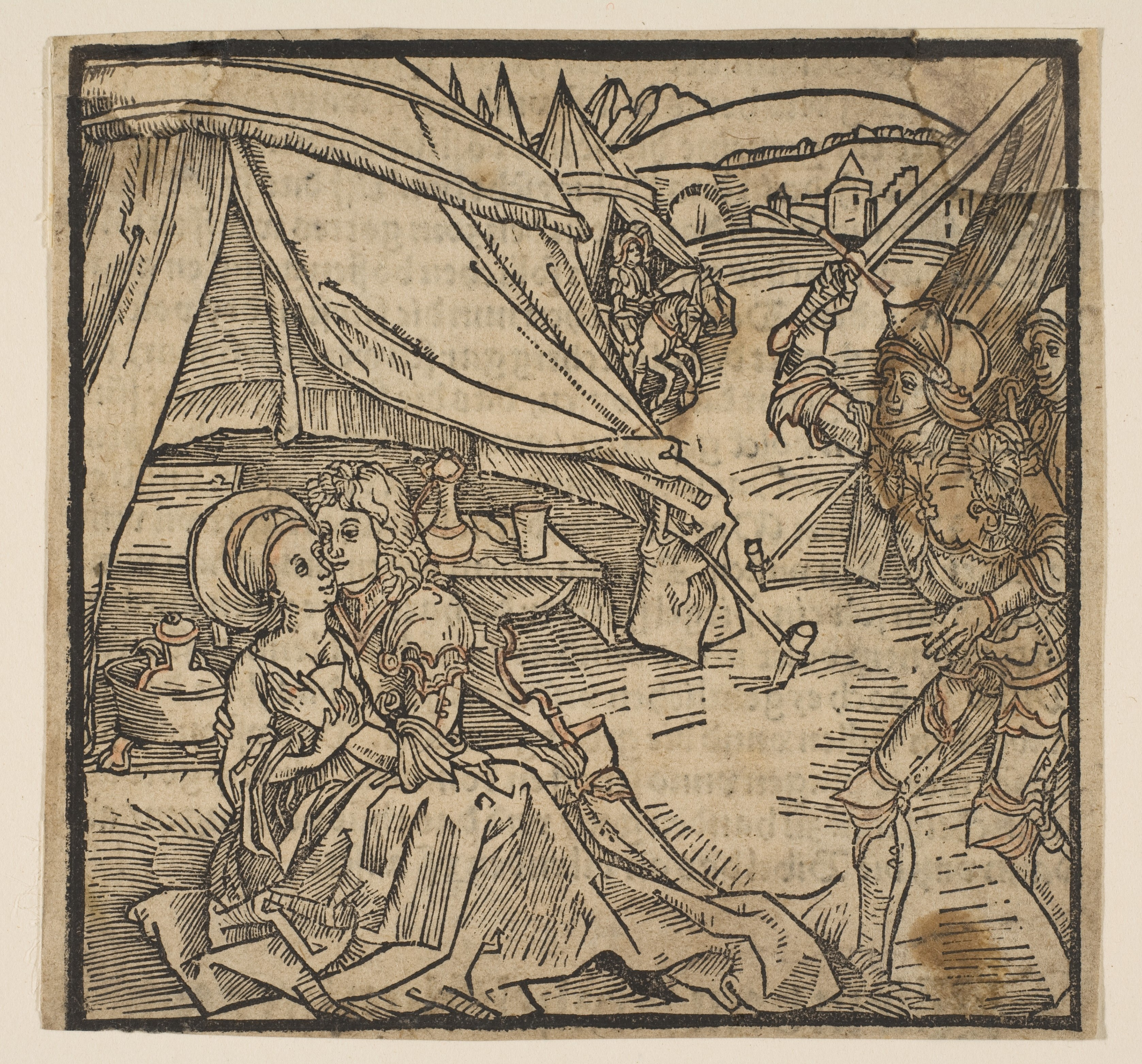

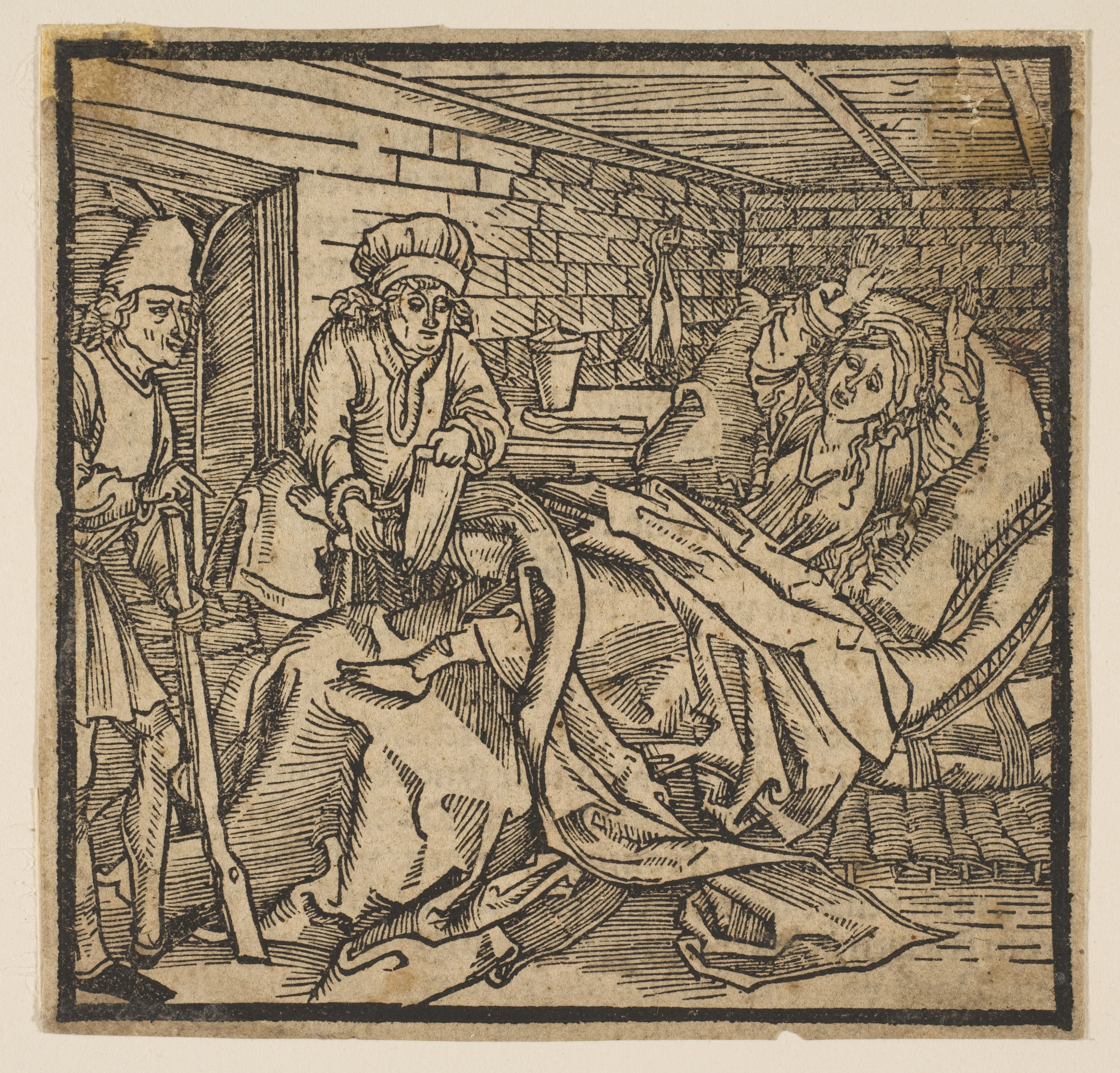

=== The Comedie of Terence (ca. 1493) ===
List of illustrations from "The Comedie of Terence" published around 1493, which are attributed to Dürer.

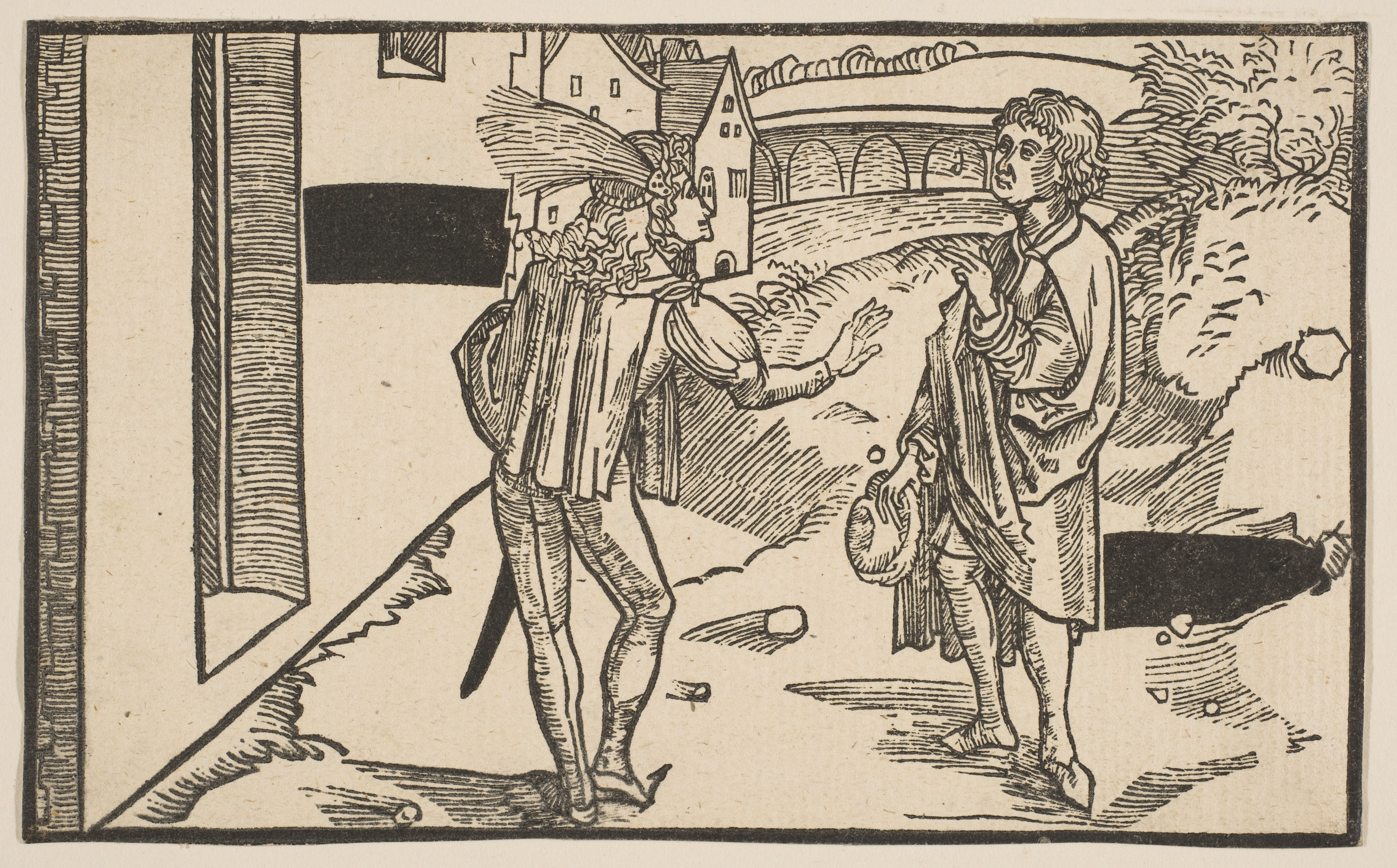

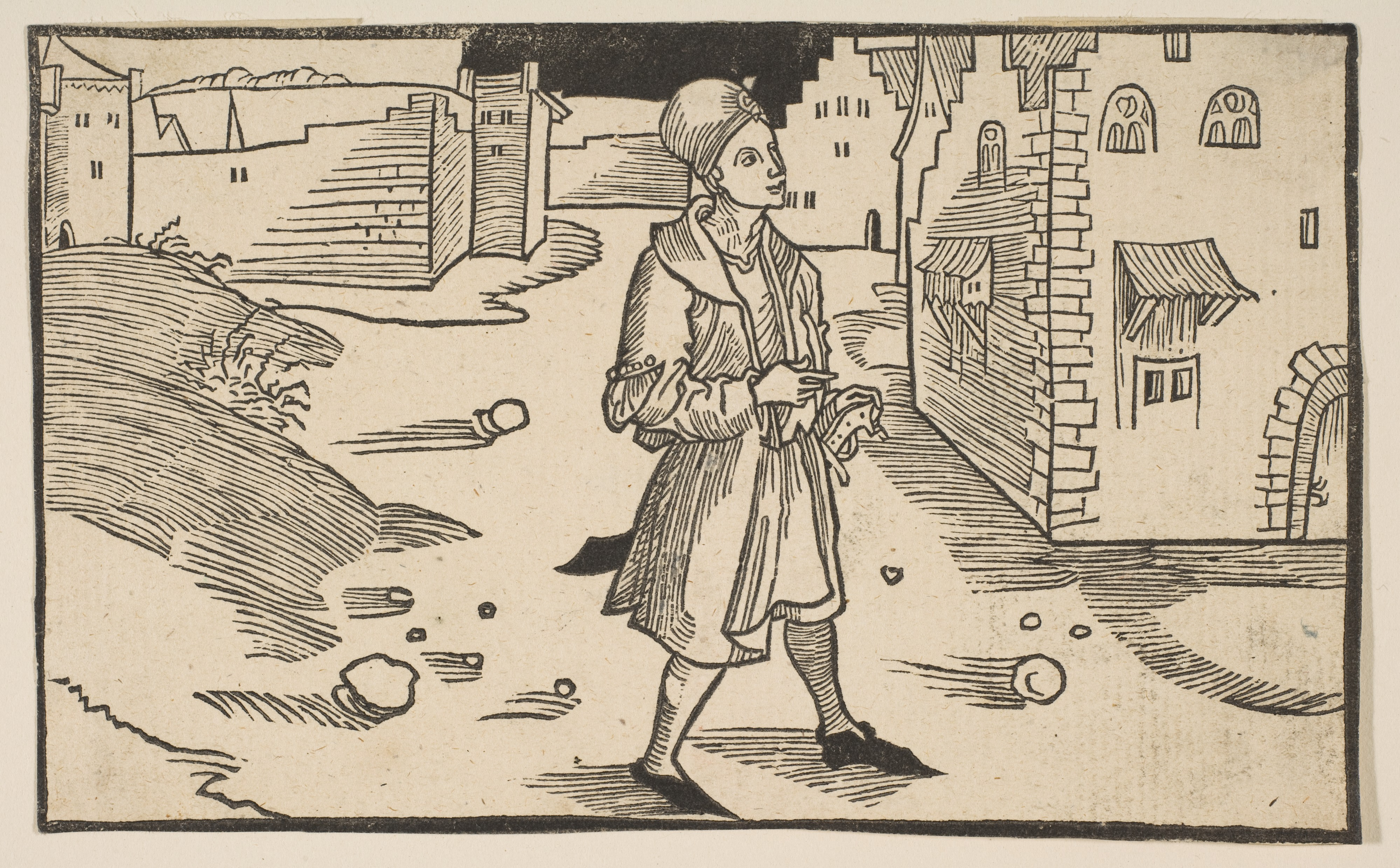

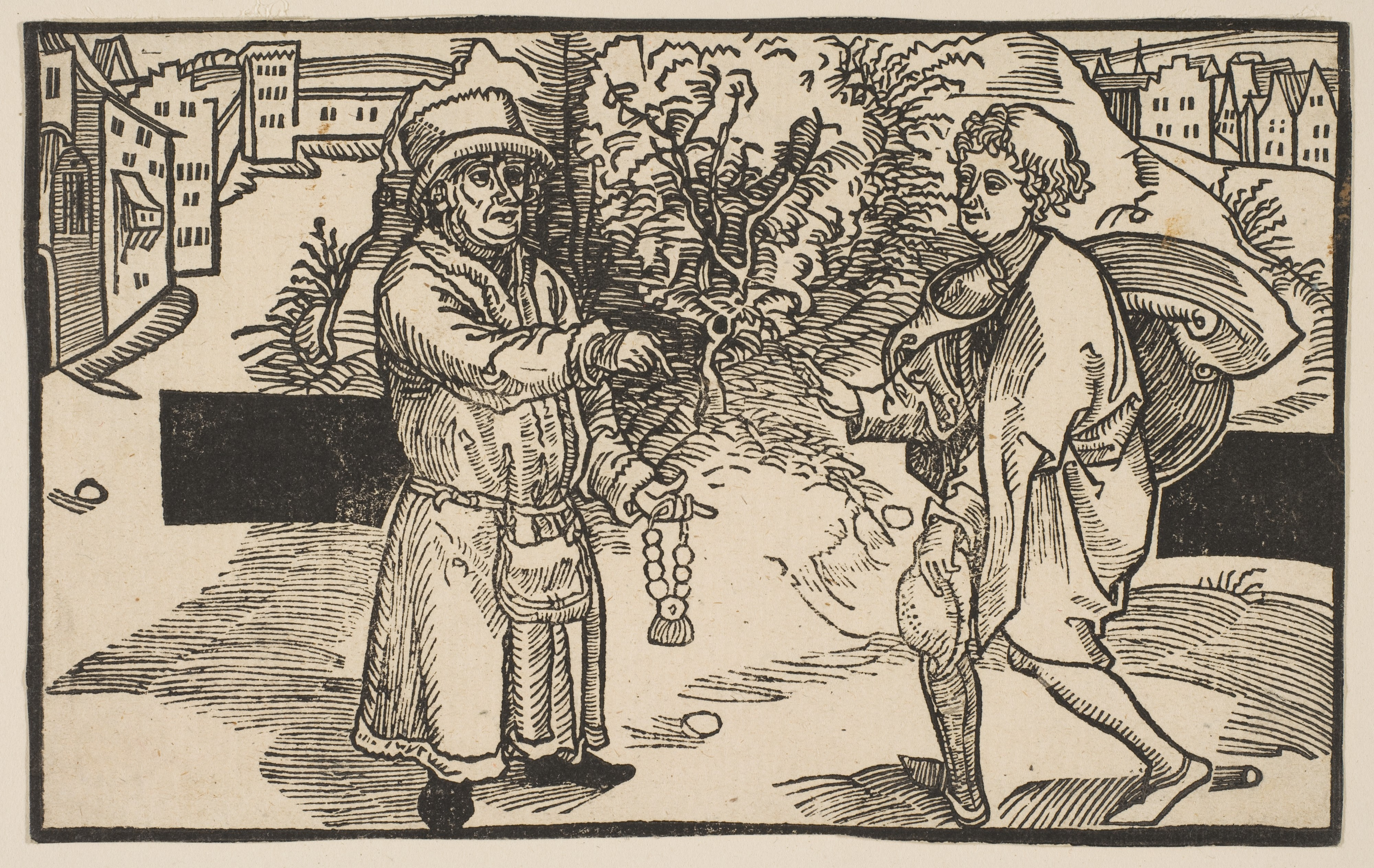

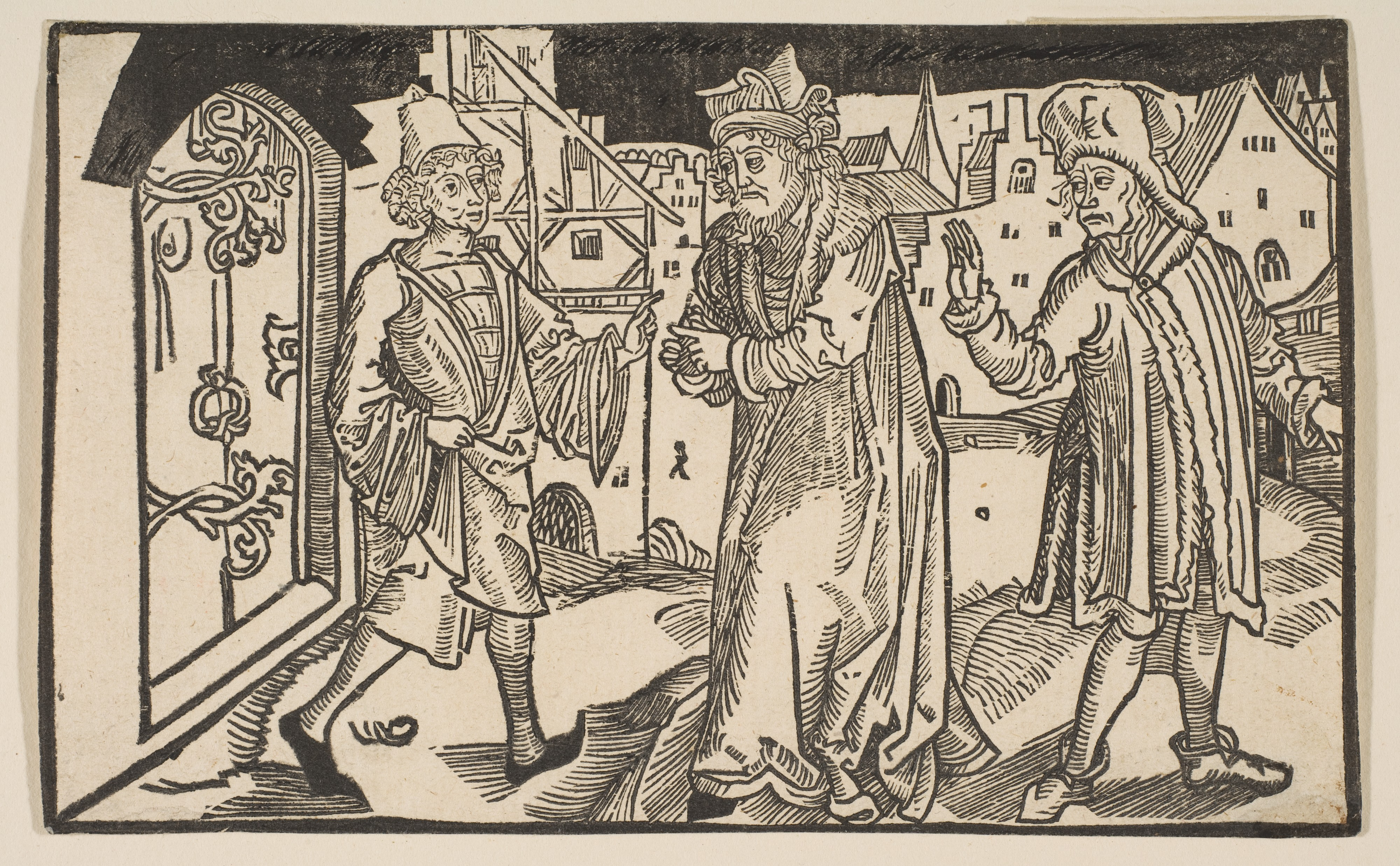

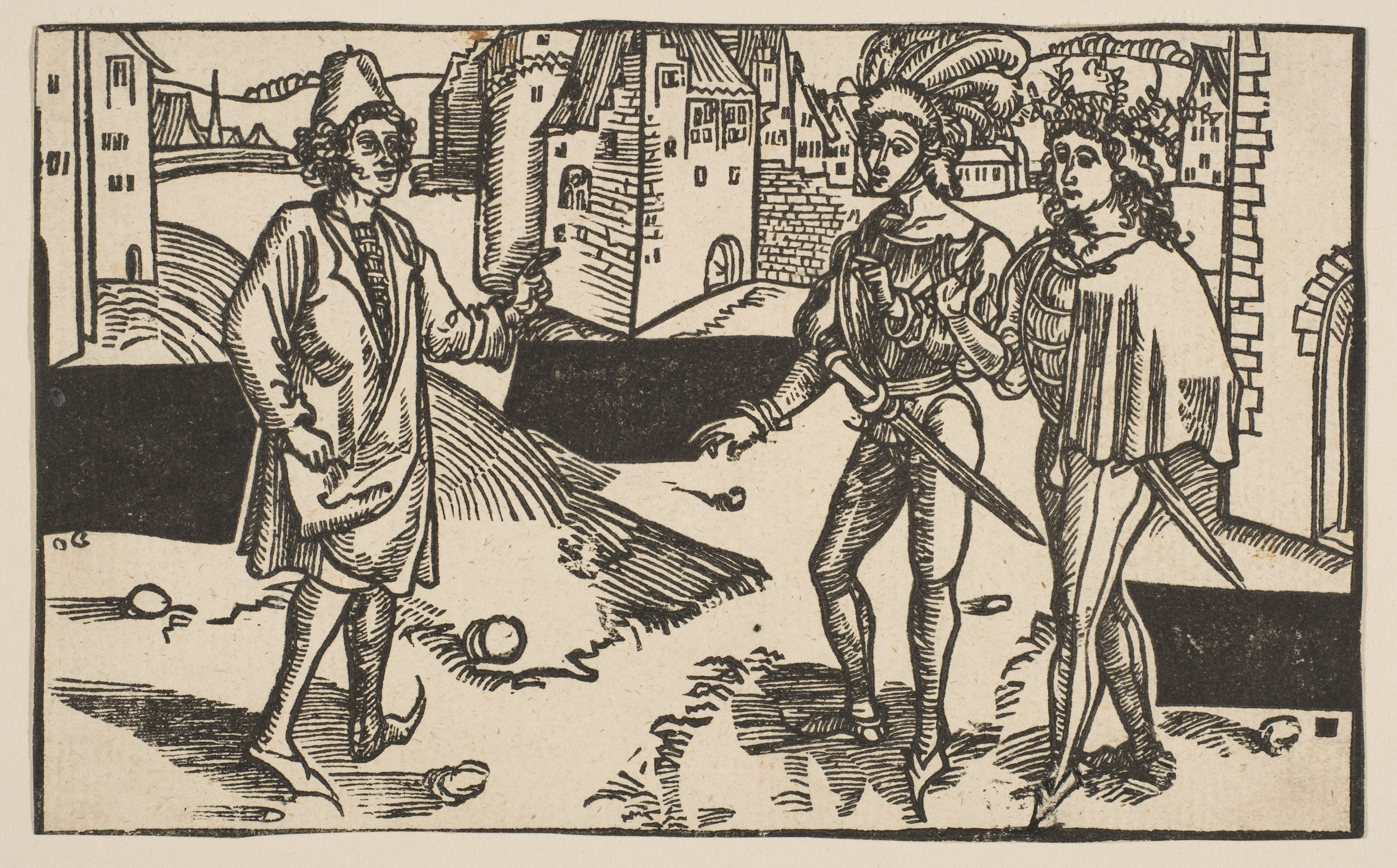

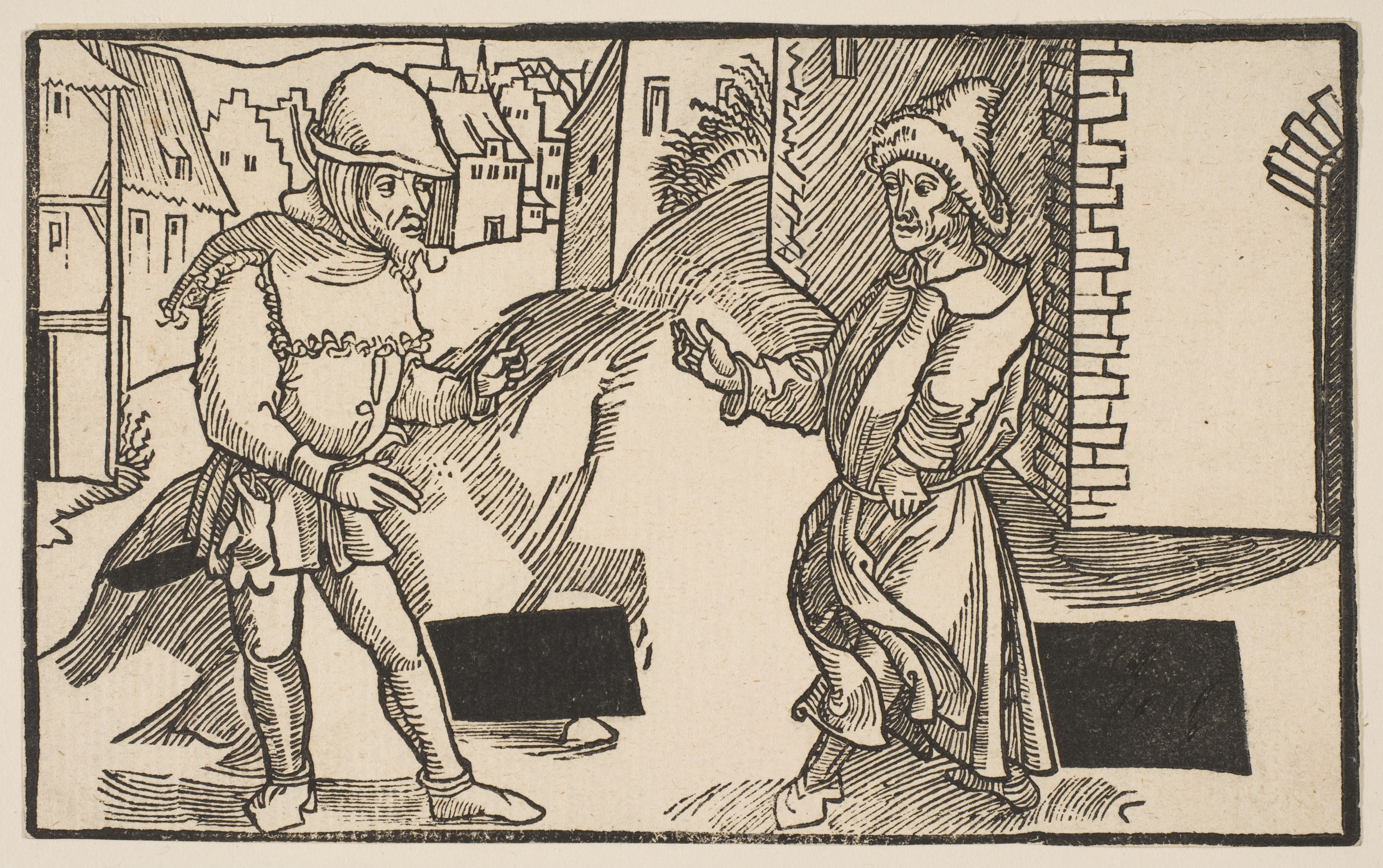

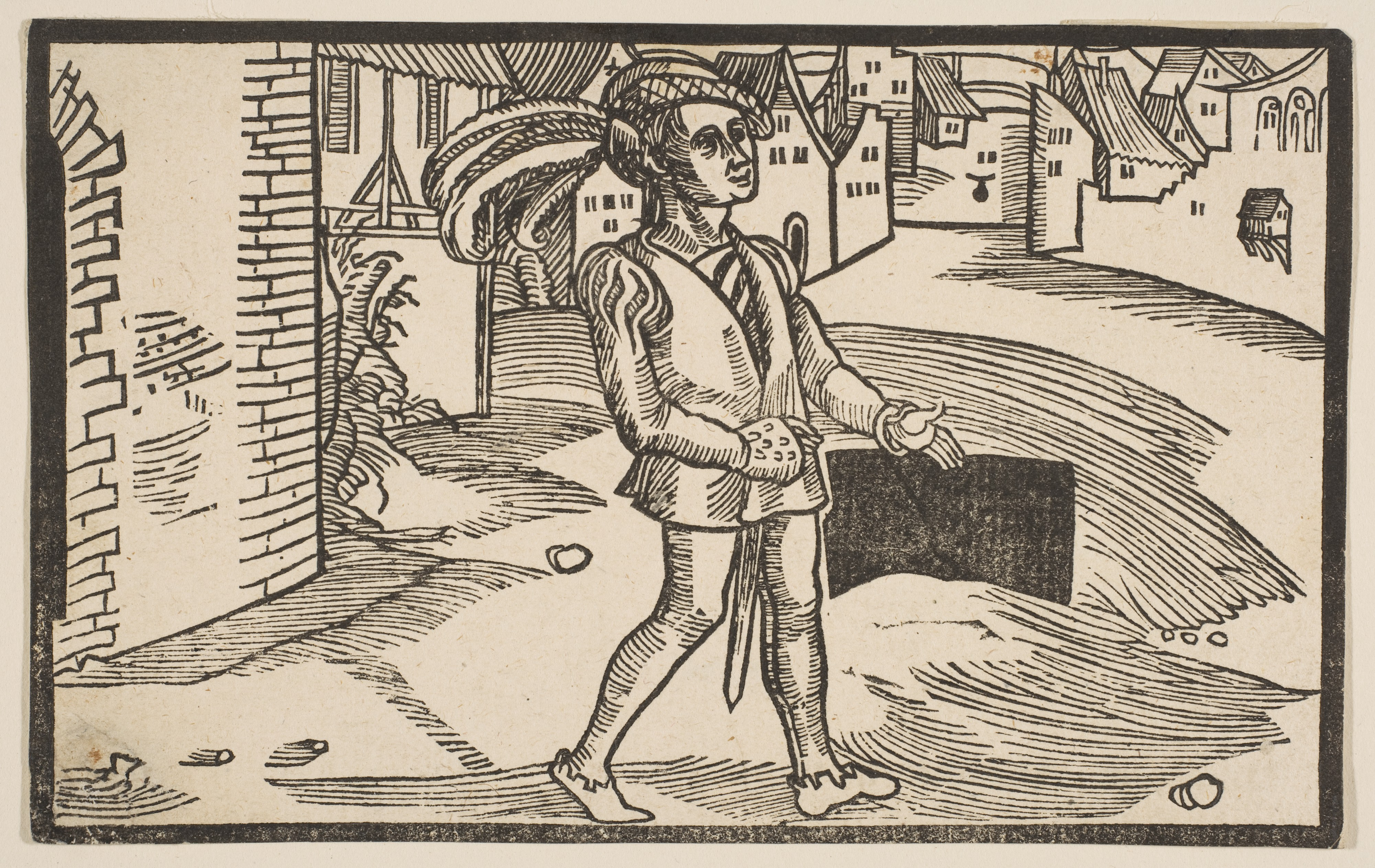

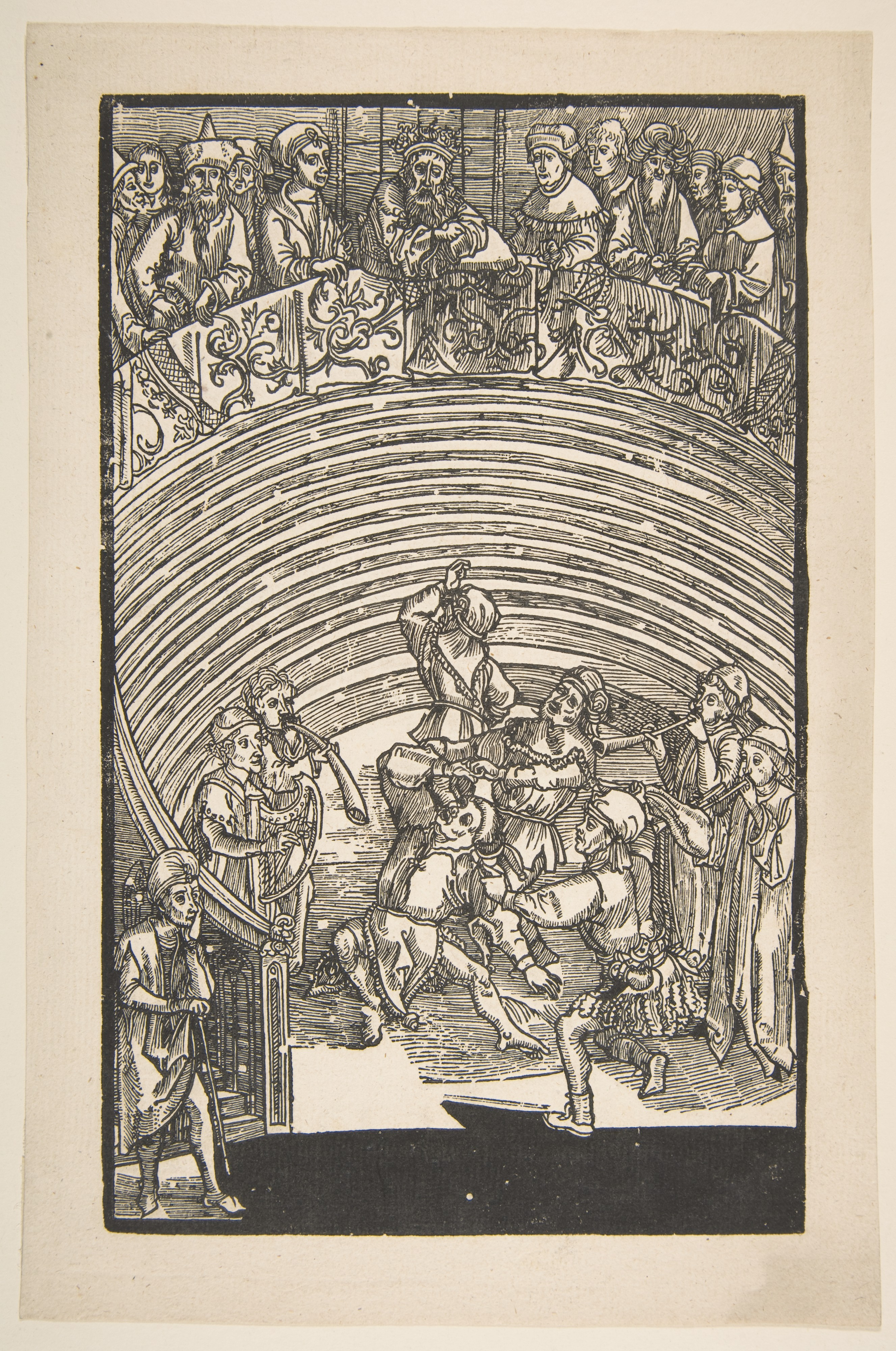

=== Ship of Fools (1494) ===
full book

List of illustrations from the book "Ship of Fools", which are attributed to Dürer.

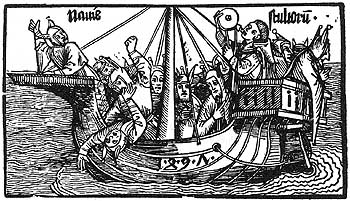
Frontiscipe of The Ship of fools

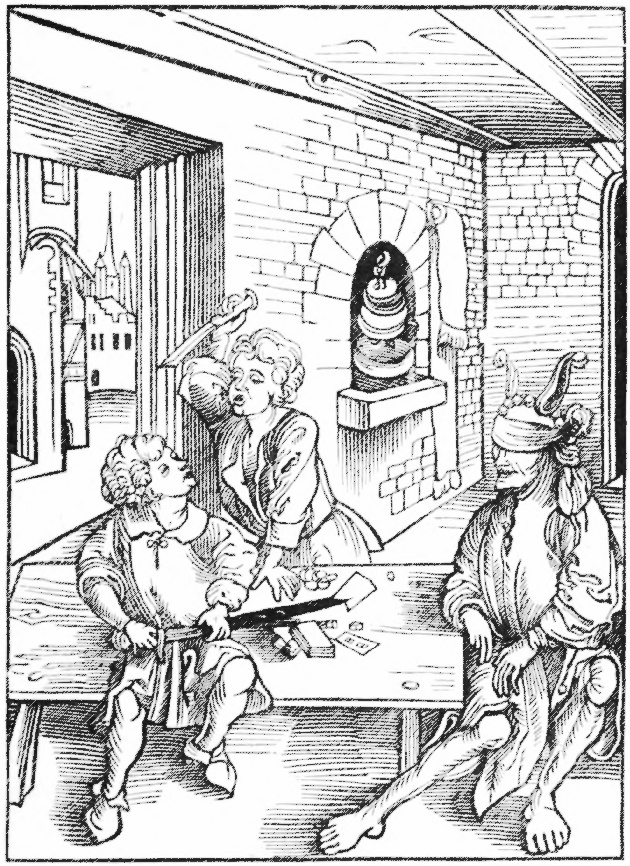
Of Negligent Fathers Ayenst Their Children

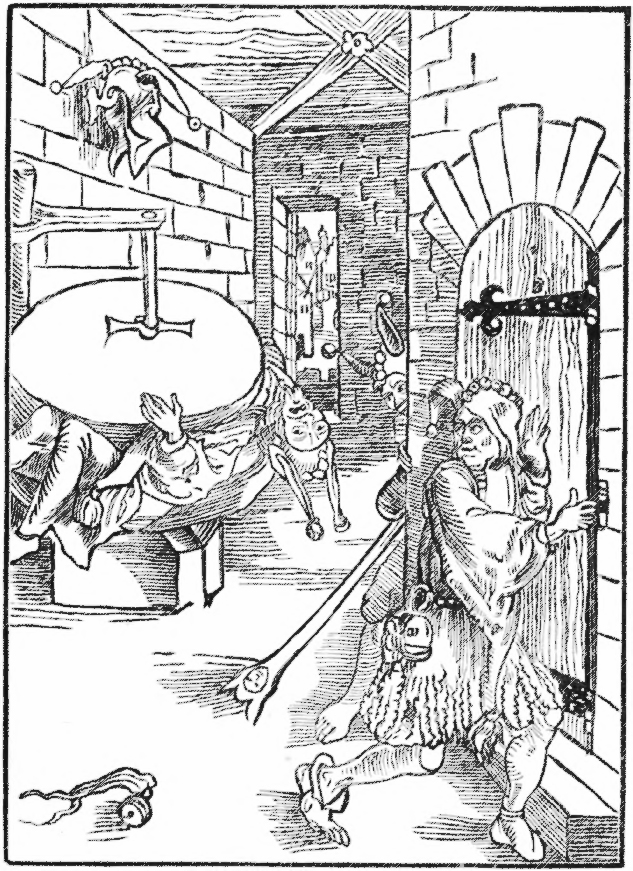
Of Taleberers And Mouers Of Debate

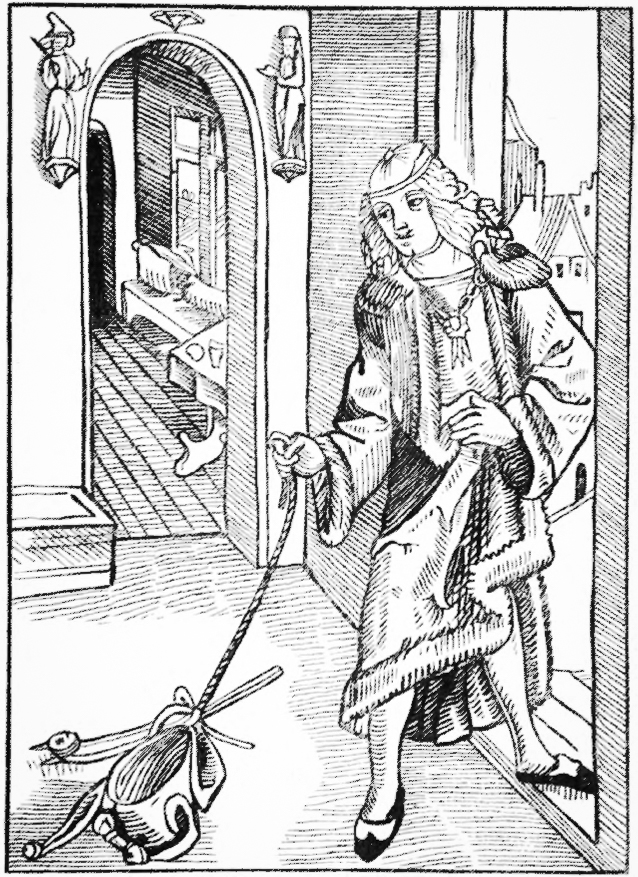
Of Vngoodly Maners, And Dysordred

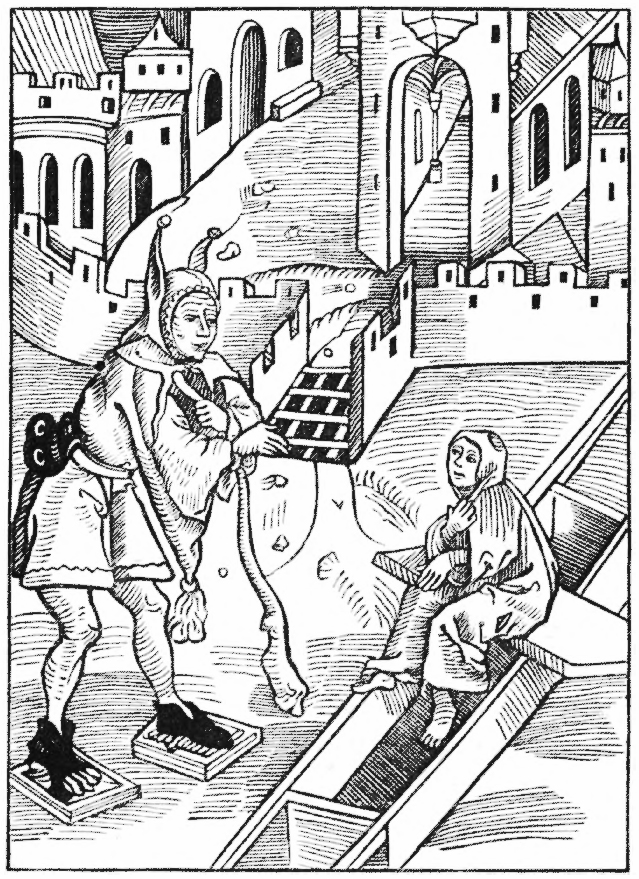
Of Dispysers Of Holy Scripture

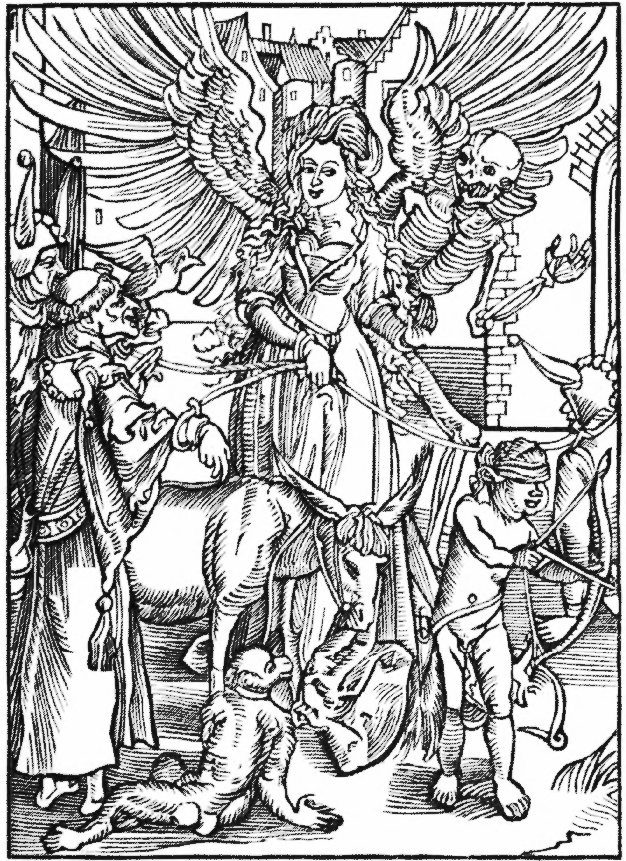
Of Disordred And Venerious Loue

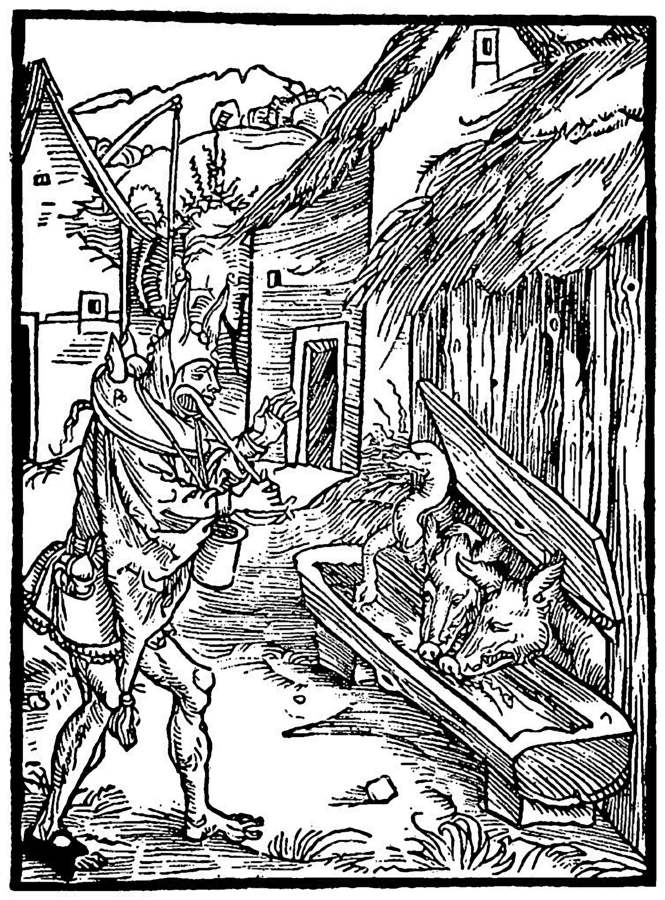
Of Them That Synne Trustynge Vpon The Mercy Of Almyghty God

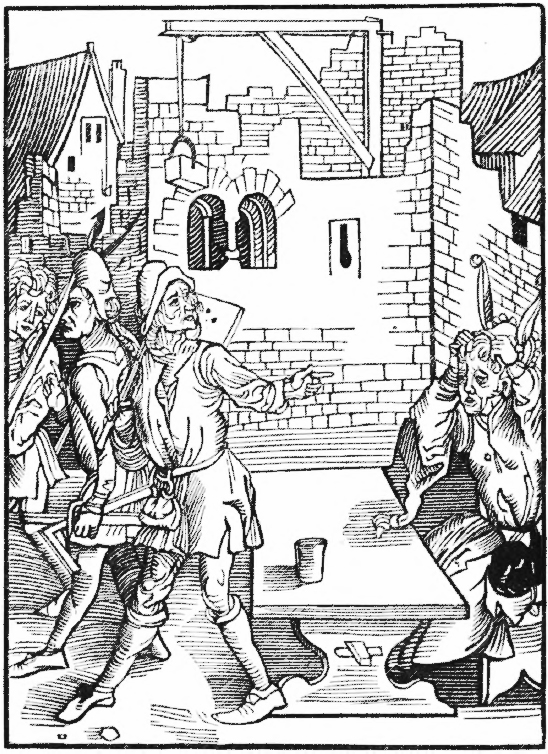
Of Folys Yt Begyn Great Byldynge Without Sufficient Prouysion

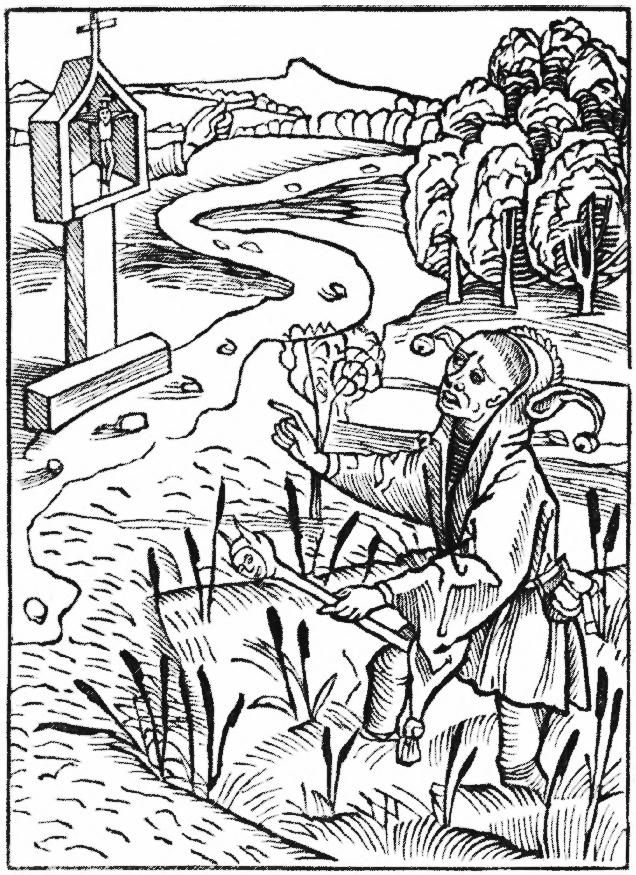
Of Them That Correct Other, Them Self Culpable In The Same Faut

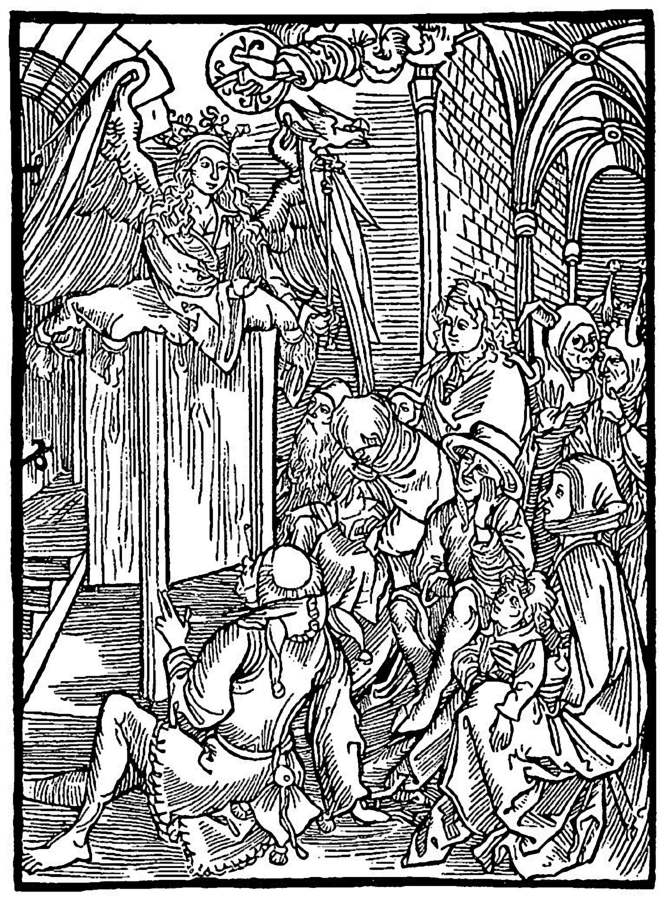
The Sermon

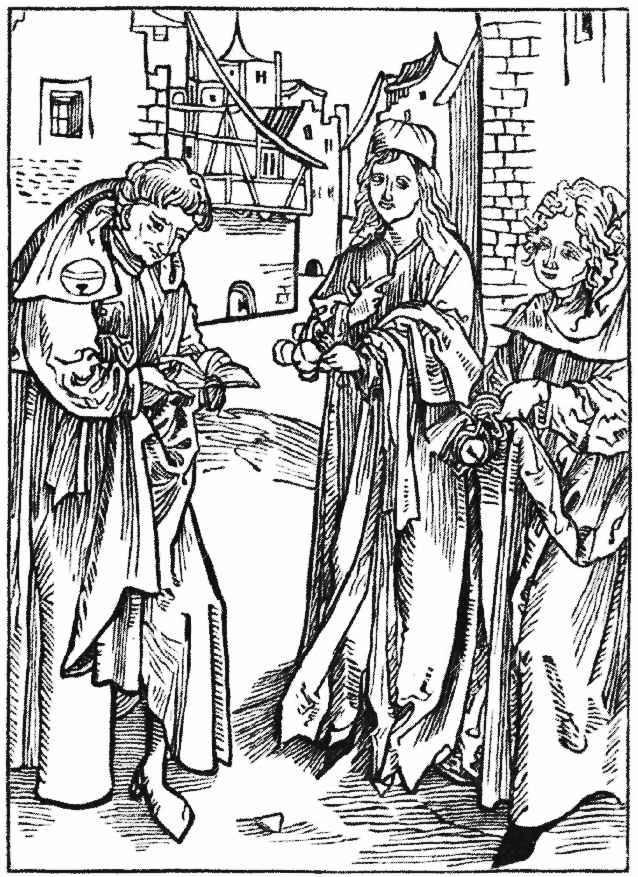
Of Negligent Stodyers

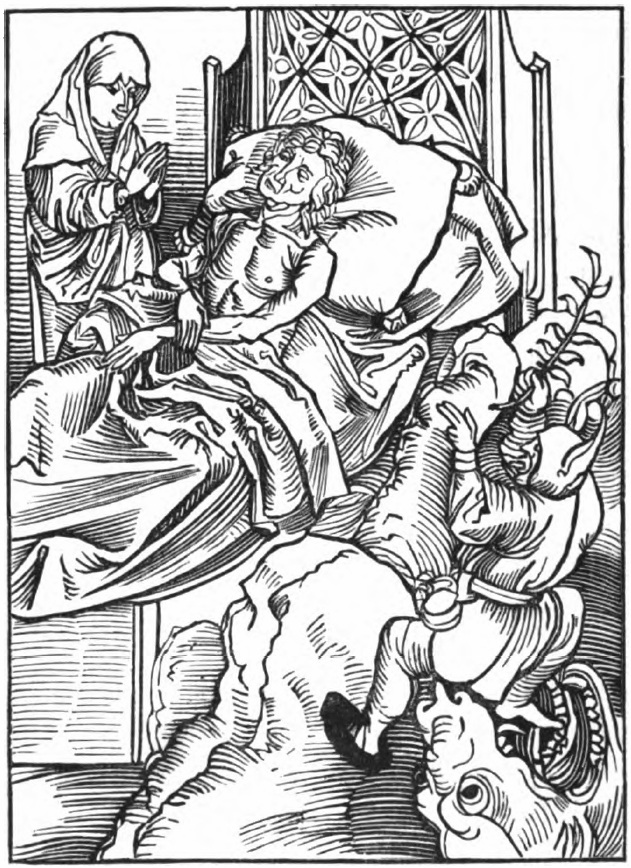
Of Lewde Juges Of Others Dedes

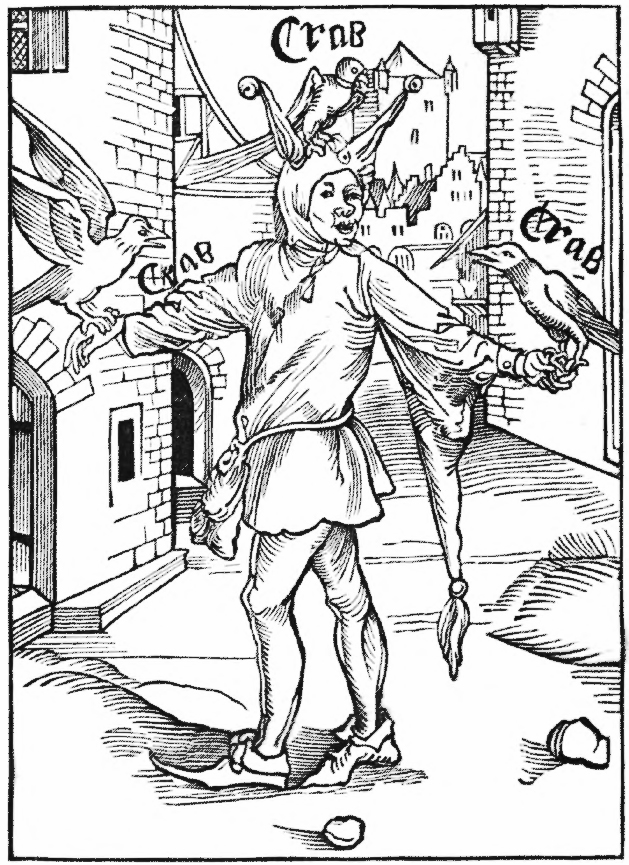
Of Synners That Prolonge From Daye To Day To Amende Theyr Myslyuyng

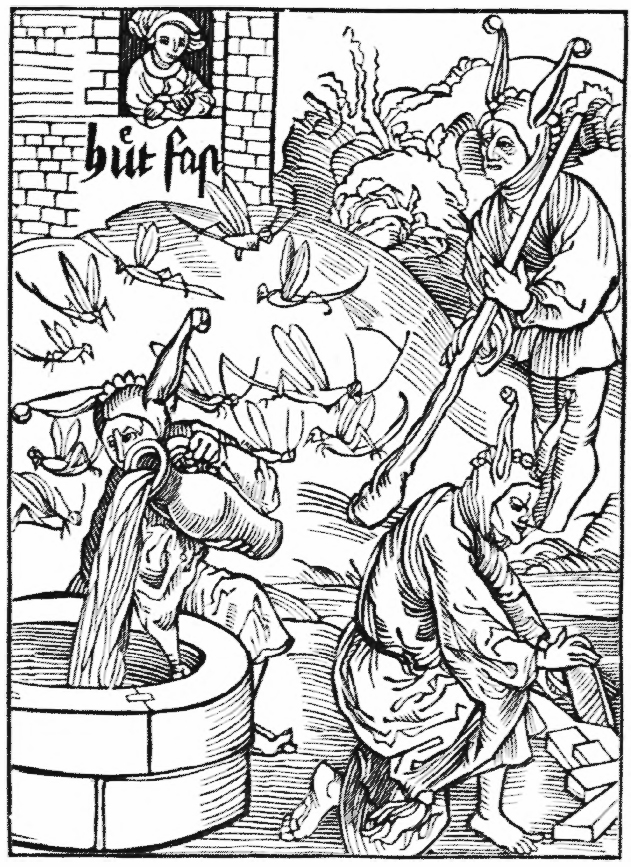
Of Men That Ar Jelous

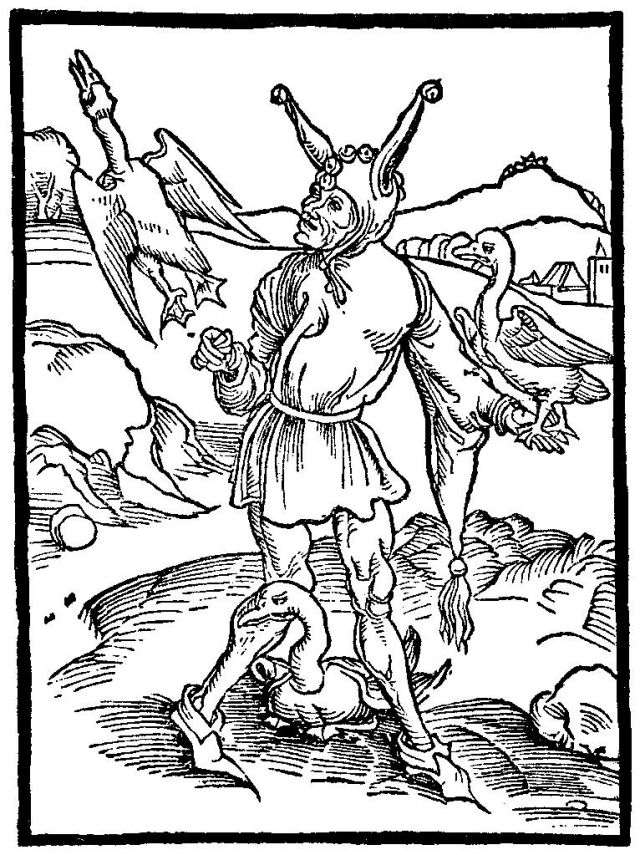
Of Suche As Nedys Wyll Contynue In Theyr Foly Nat Withstandynge Holsom Erudicion

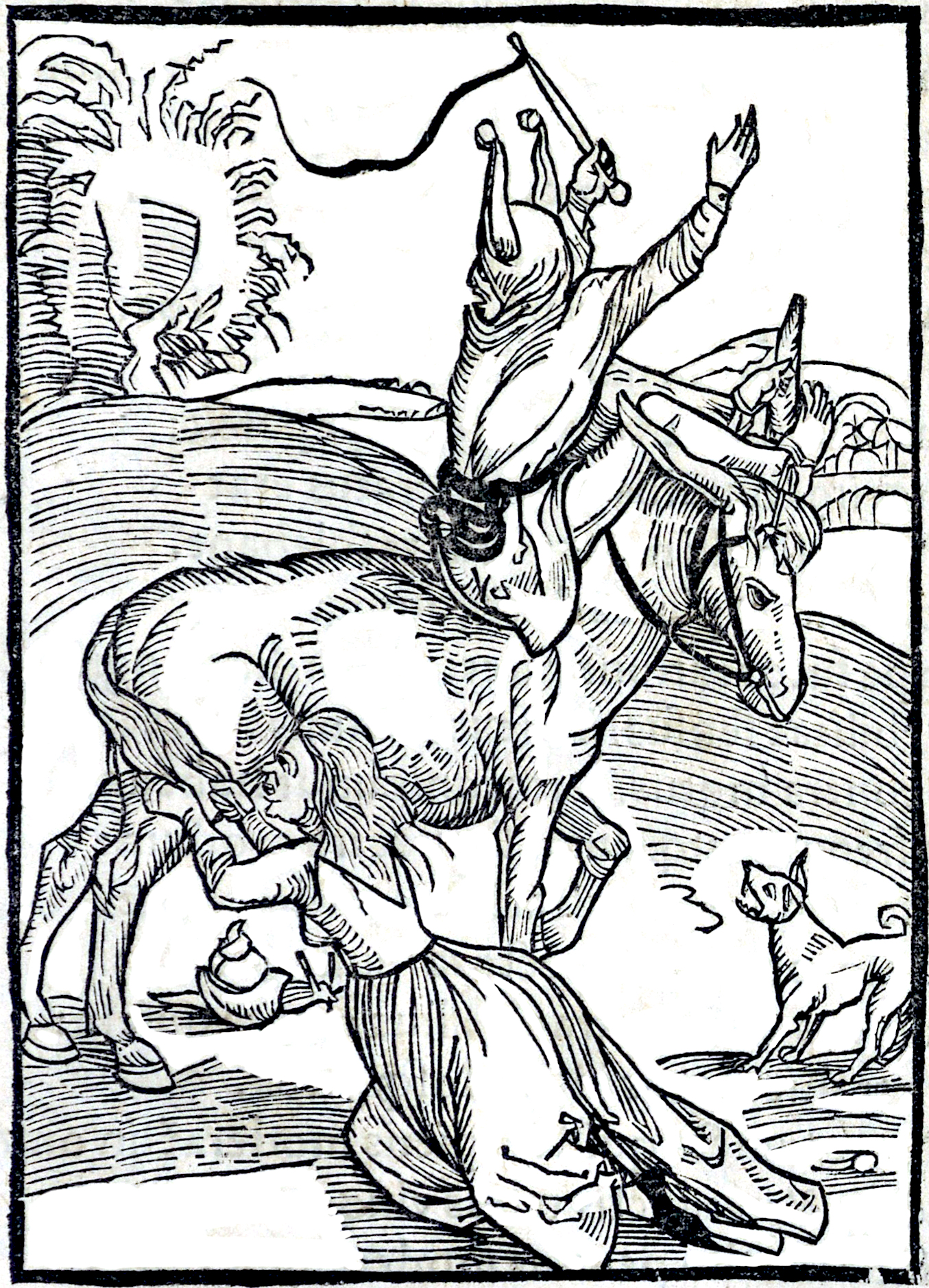
Of Wrathfull Folys

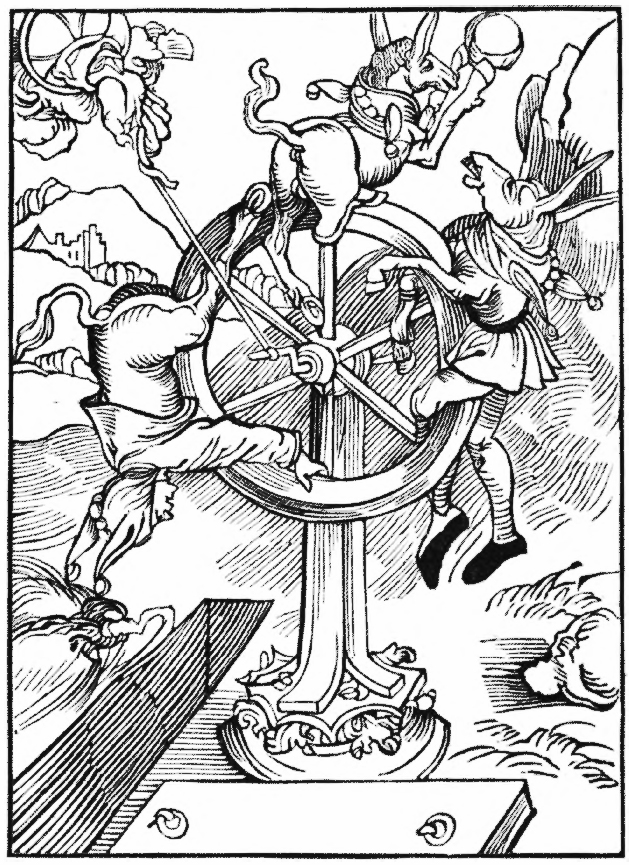
Of The Mutabylyte Of Fortune

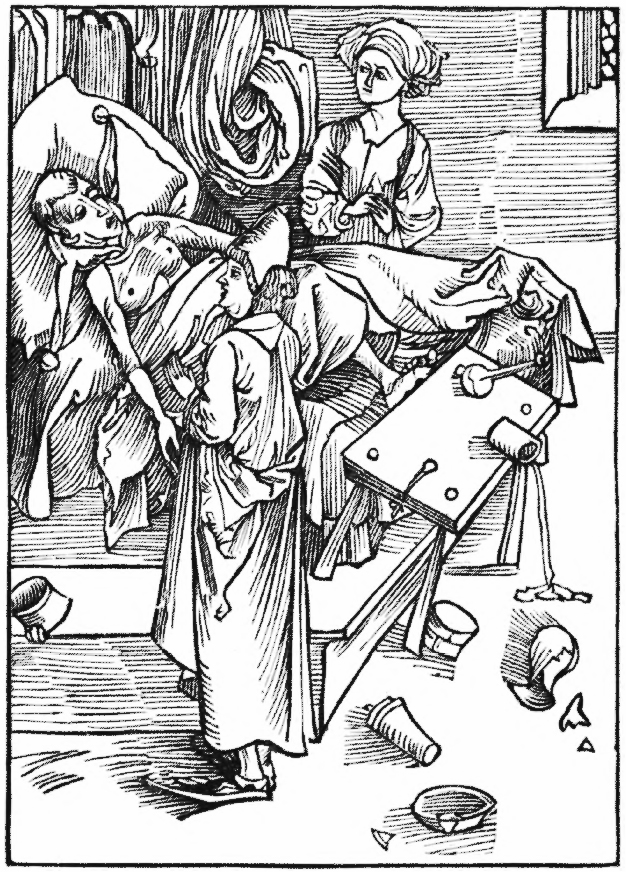
Of Seke Men Inobedient

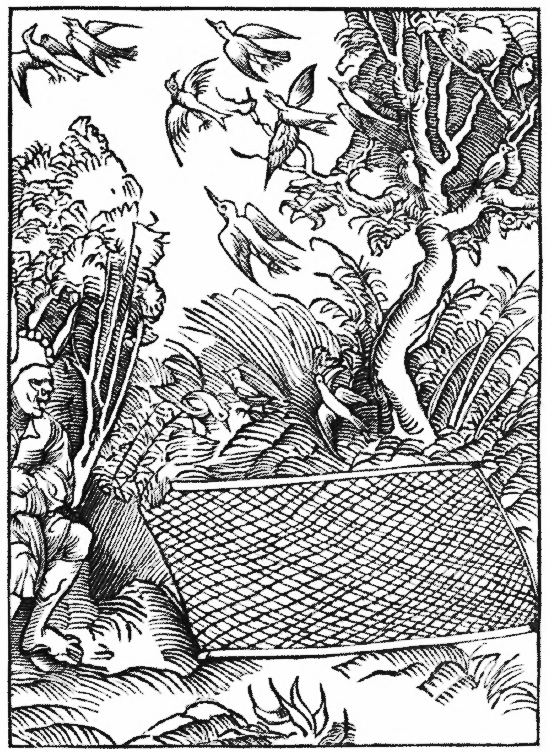
Of To Open Councellers

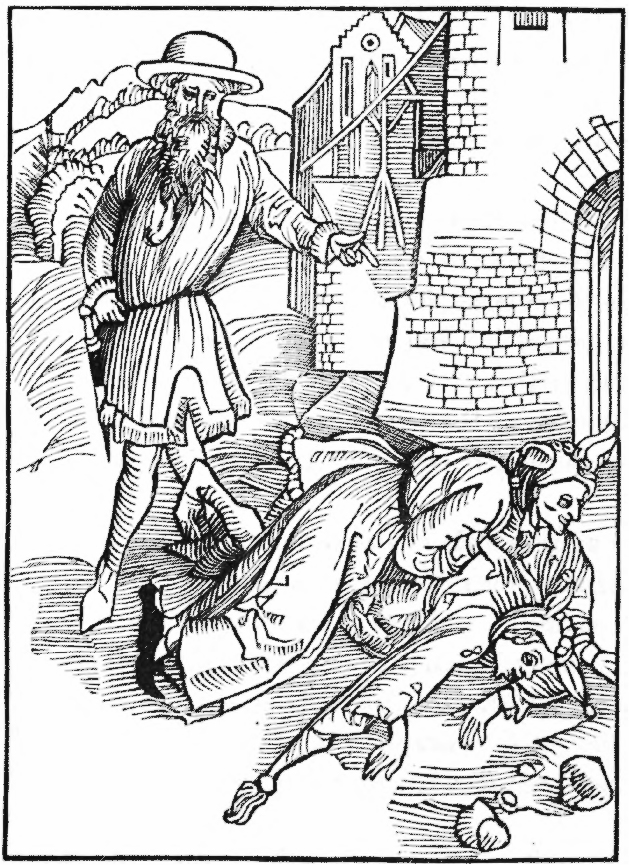
Of Folys That Can Nat Be Ware By Ye Mysfortune Nor Take Example Of Others Damage

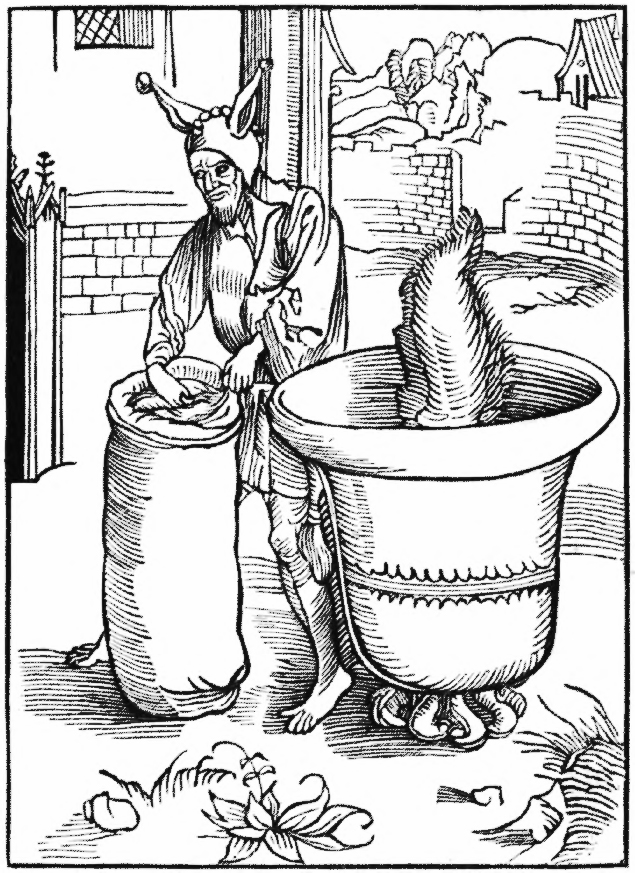
Of Folys That Force Or Care For The Bacbytynge Of Lewde People

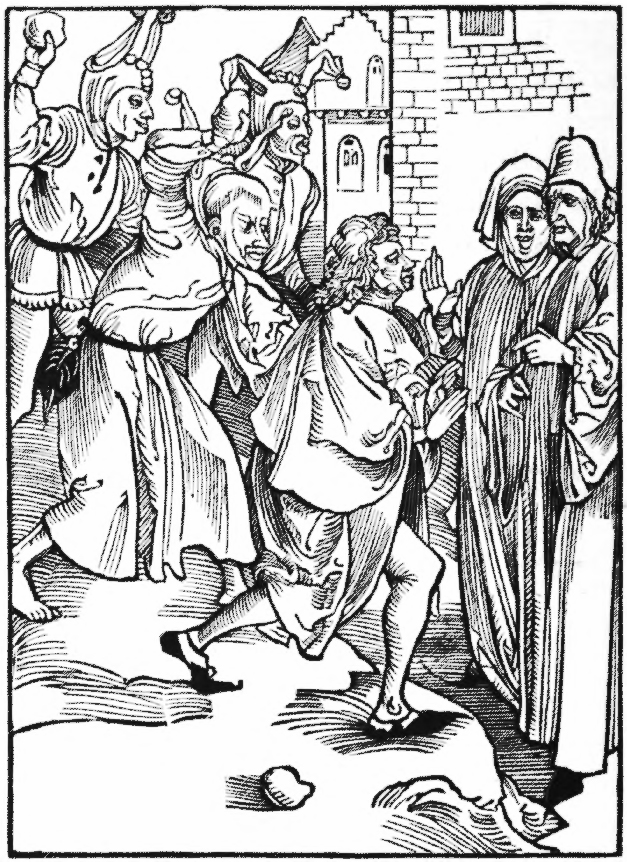
Of Mockers And Fals Accusers

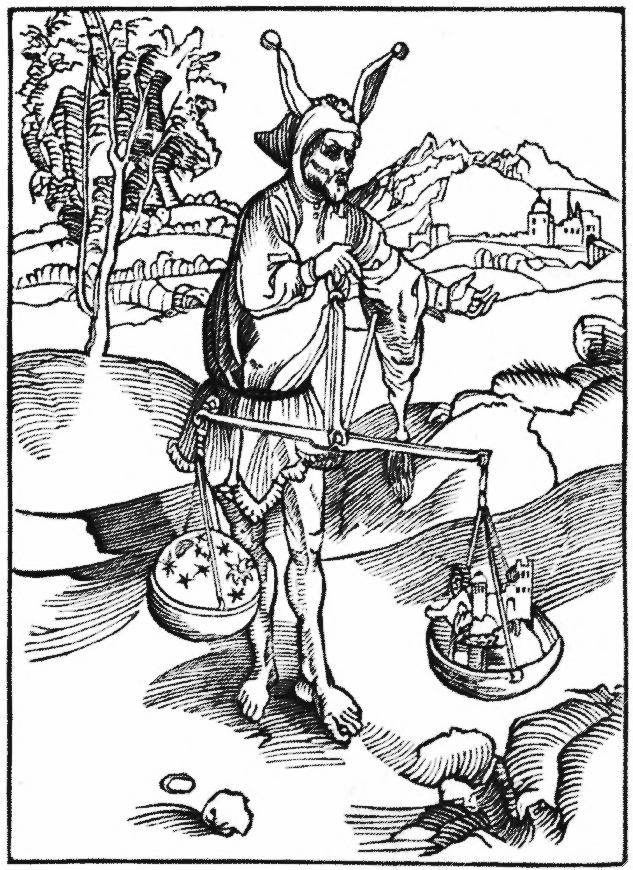
Of Them That Despyse Euerlastynge Blys For Worldly Thynges And Transitory

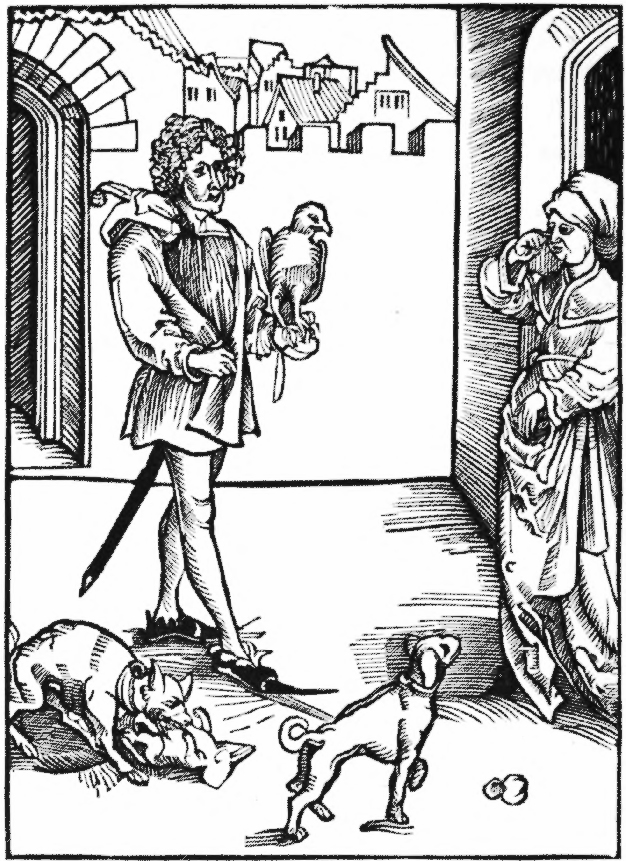
Of Talkers And Makers Of Noyse In The Chirche Of God

Of Folys That Put Them Self In Wylful Ieopardy And Peryll

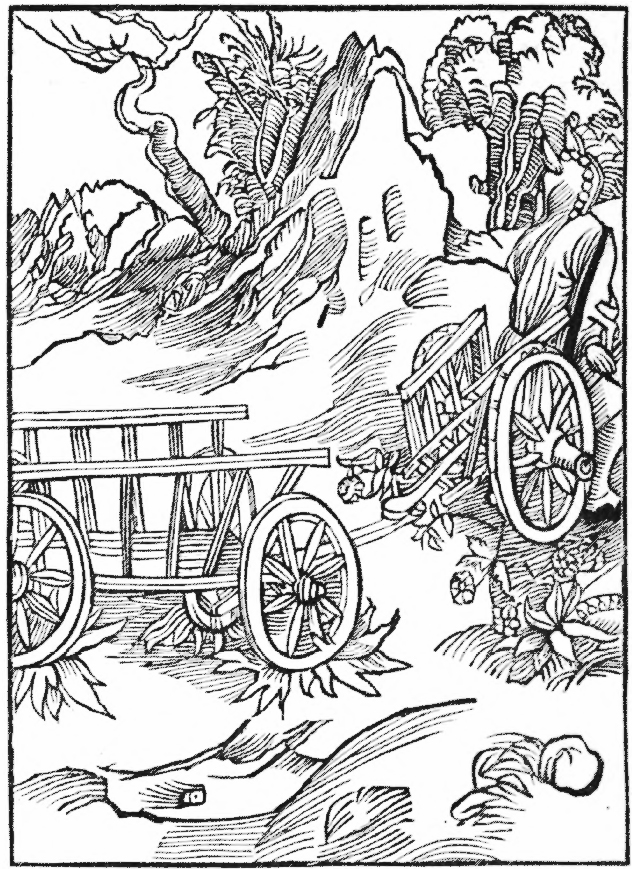
Of The Way Of Felycyte, And Godnes And The Payne To Come To Synners

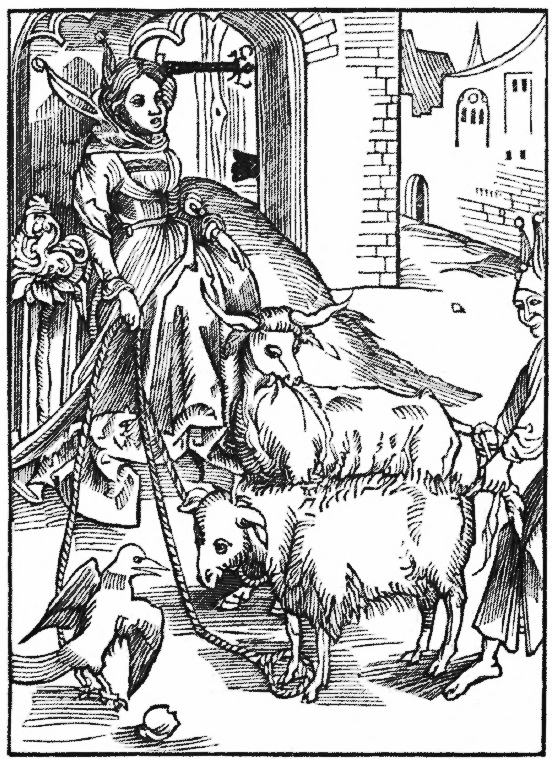
Of Bodely Lust Or Corporall Voluptuosyte

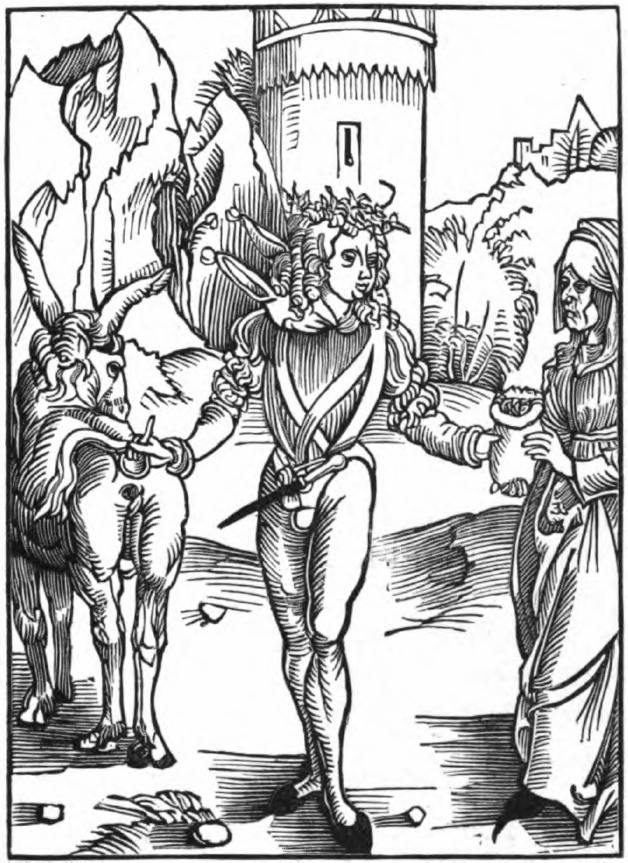
Of Yonge Folys That Take Olde Wymen To Theyr Wyues Nat For Loue But For Ryches

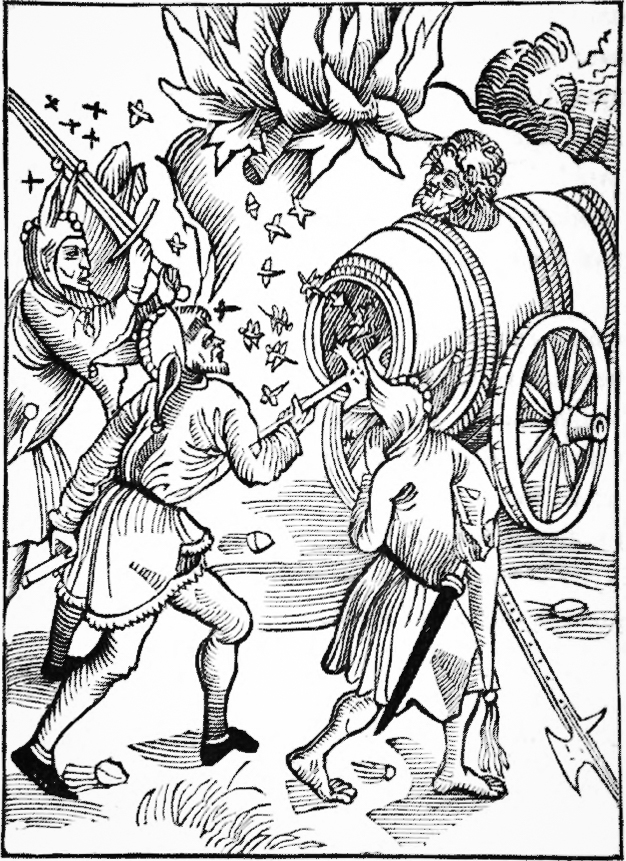
Of Enuyous Folys

Of Impacient Folys Disdaynynge To Abyde And Suffer Correccion, For Theyr Profyte

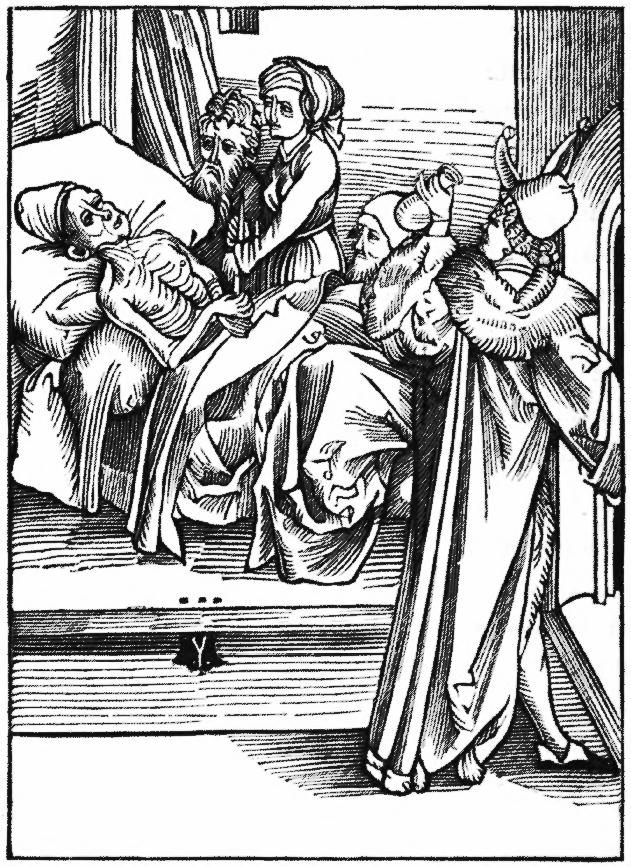
Of Folysshe Fesicians Vsynge Theyr Practyke Without Speculacyon

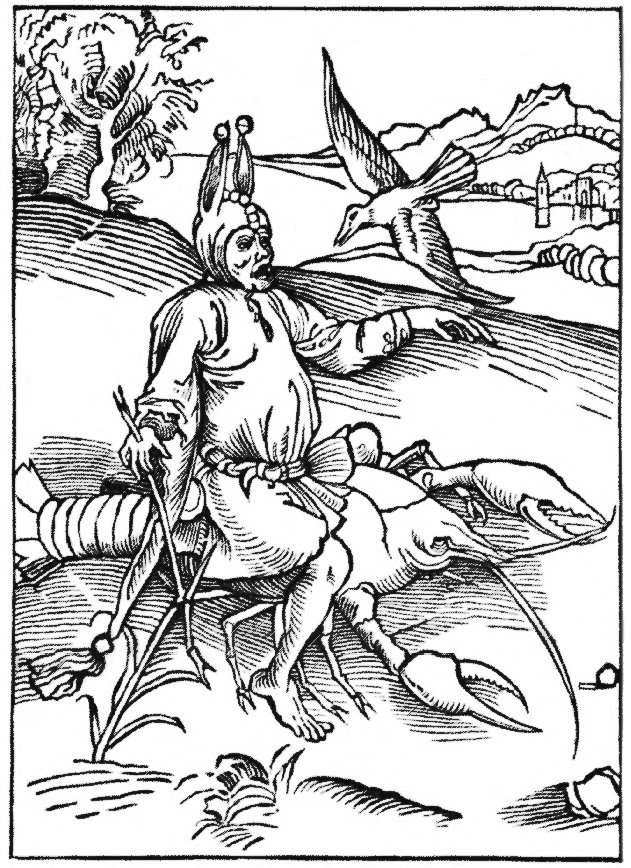
Of Predestinacyon

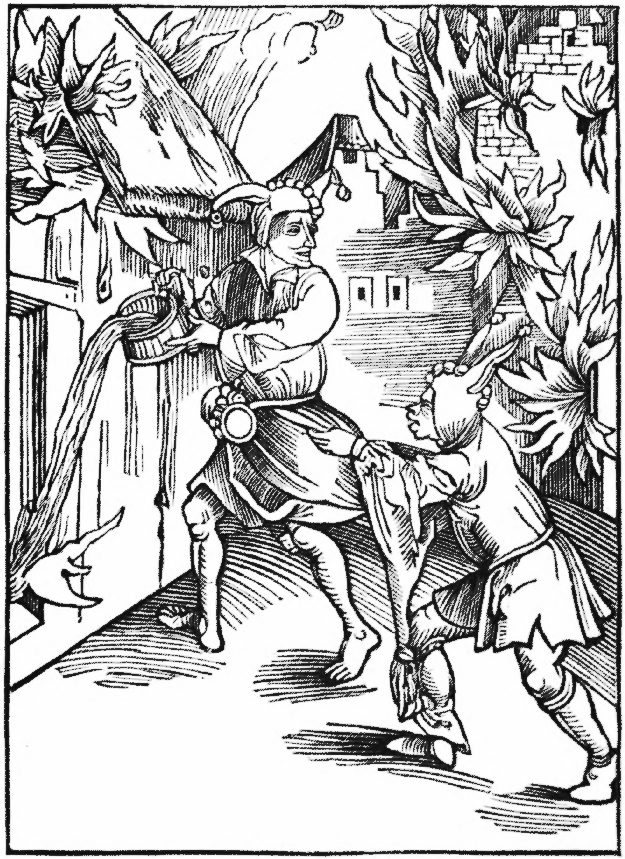
Of Folys That Aply Other Mennys Besynes Leuynge Theyr Owne Vndone

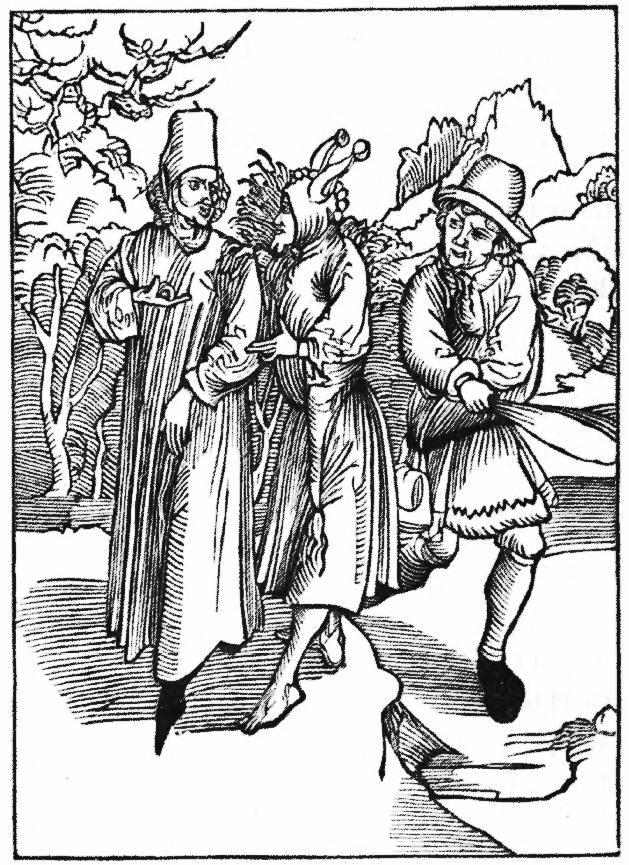
Of The Vyce Of Ingratytude Or Vnkyndnes And Folys That Vse It

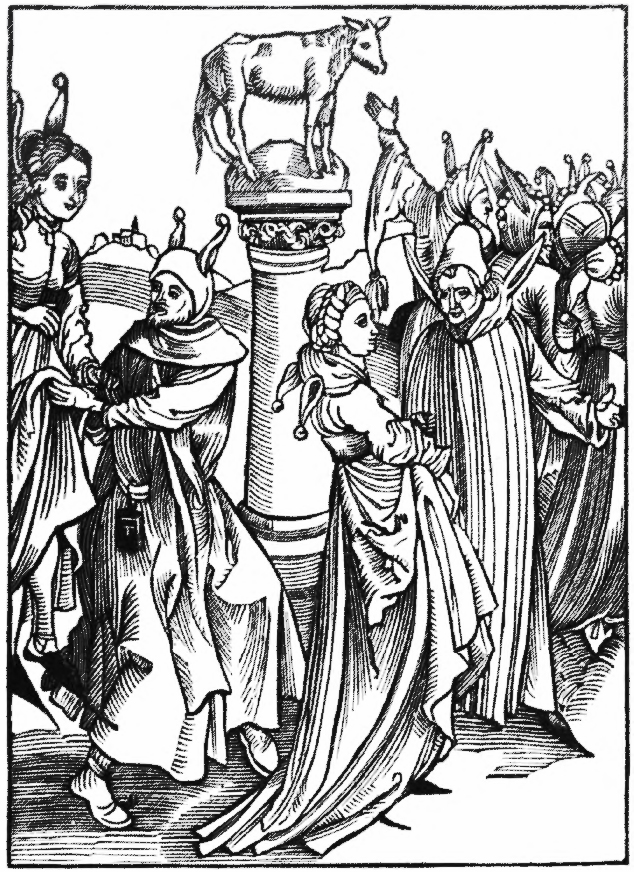
Of Folys That Delyte Them In Daunsynge

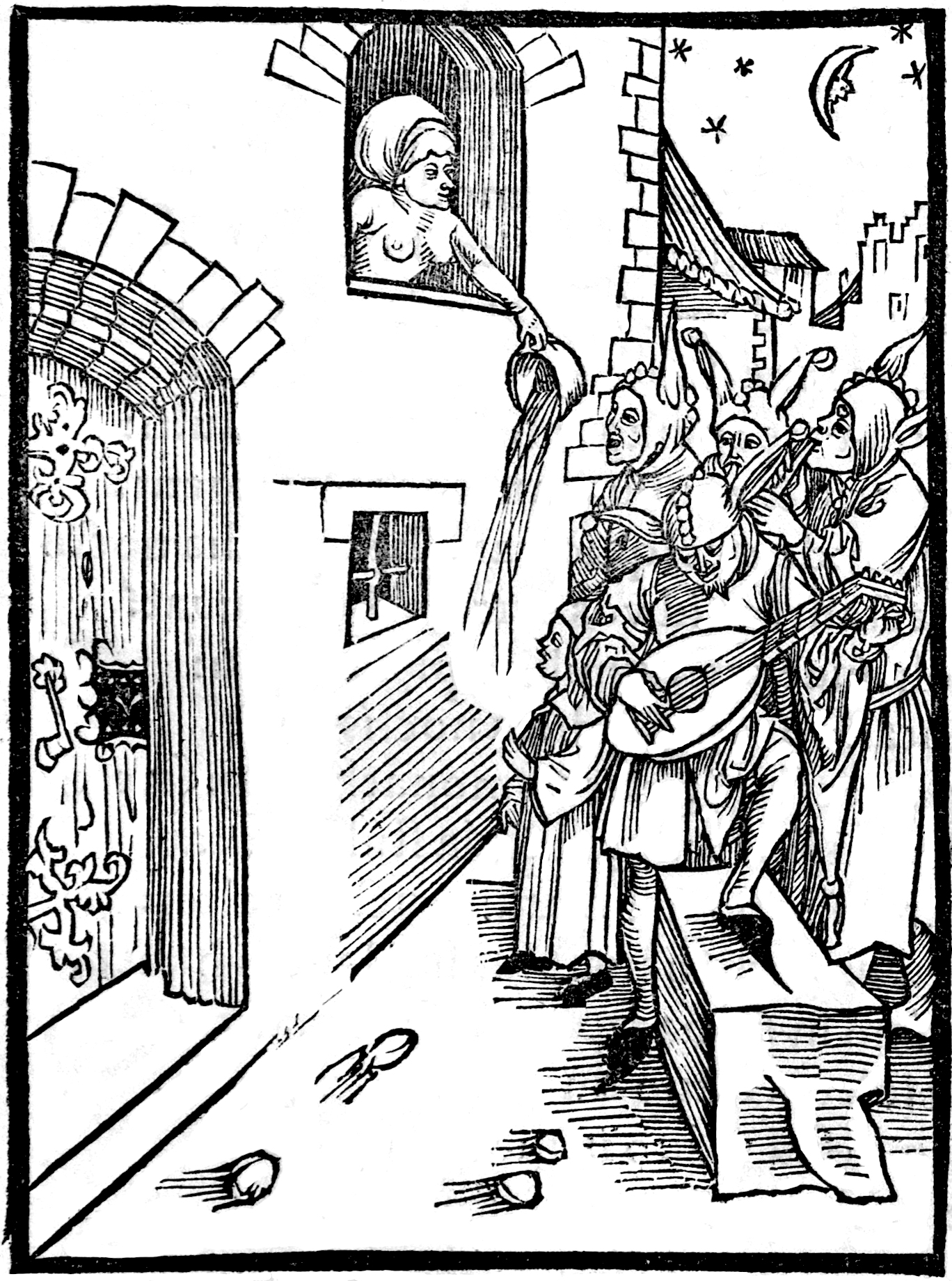
Of Nyght Watchers

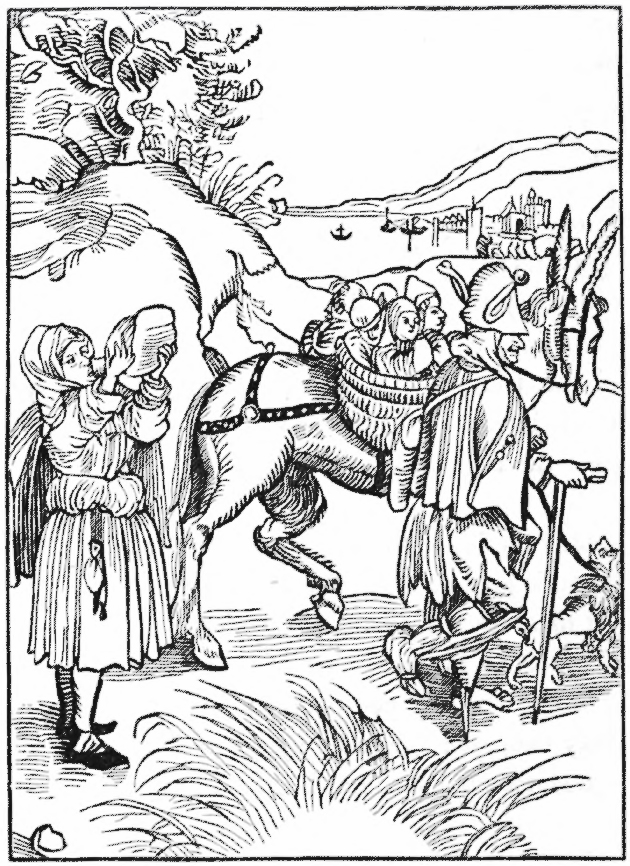
Of The Vanyte Of Beggers

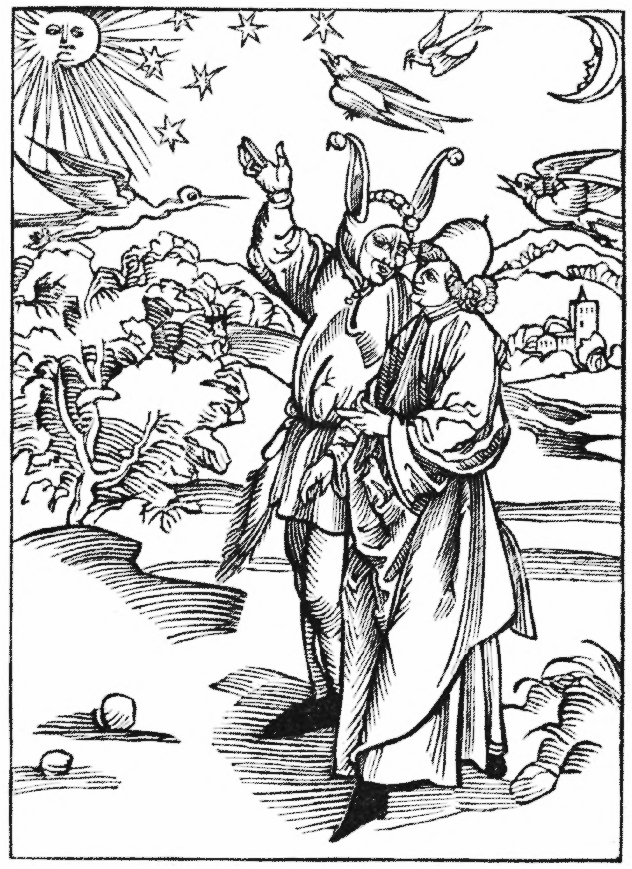
Of Ye Vayne Cure Of Astronomy

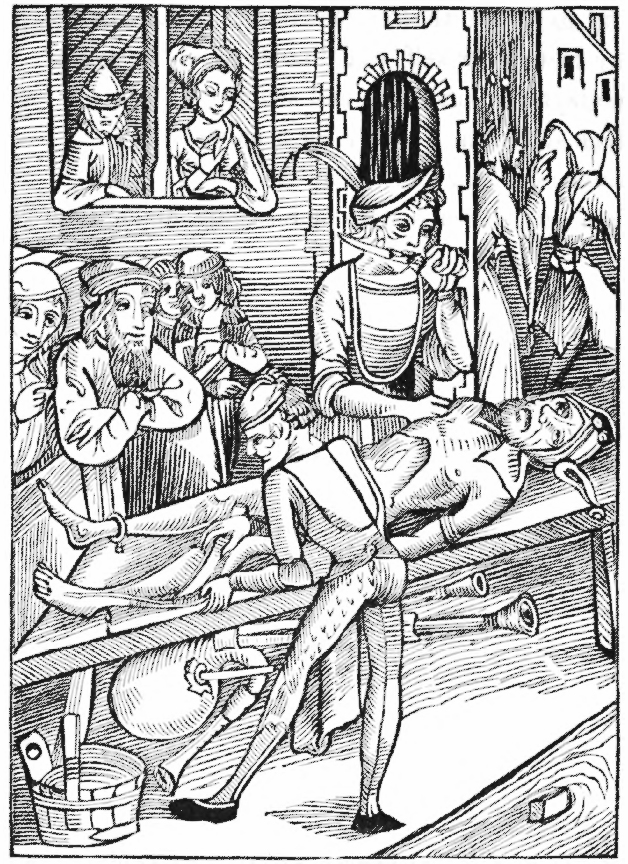
Of Folys Yet Stryue Agaynst Theyr Betters Nat Wyllynge To Se Theyr Foly

Of Folys That Can Nat Vnderstande Sport And Yet Wyll Haue To Do With Folys

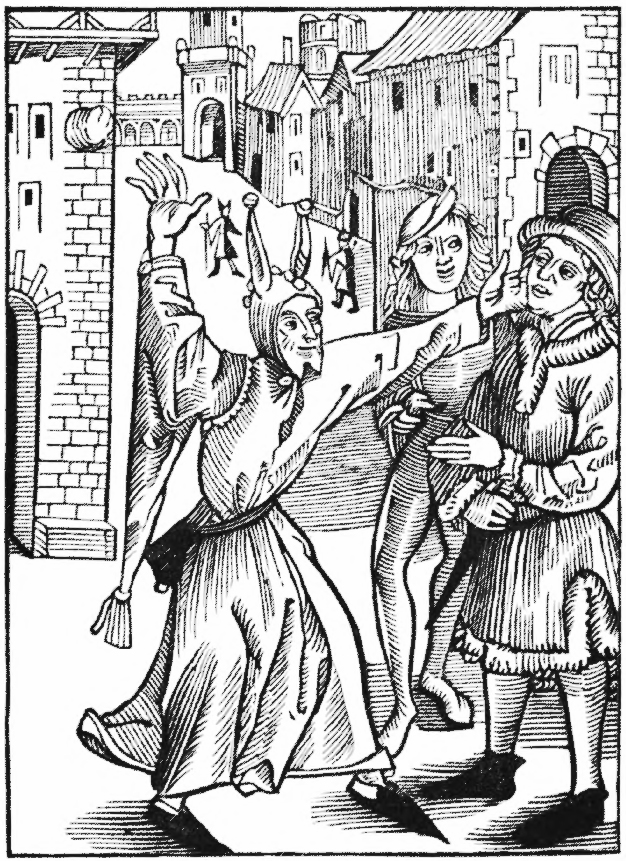
Of Folys That Hurte Euery Man Nat Wyllynge To Be Hurt Agayne

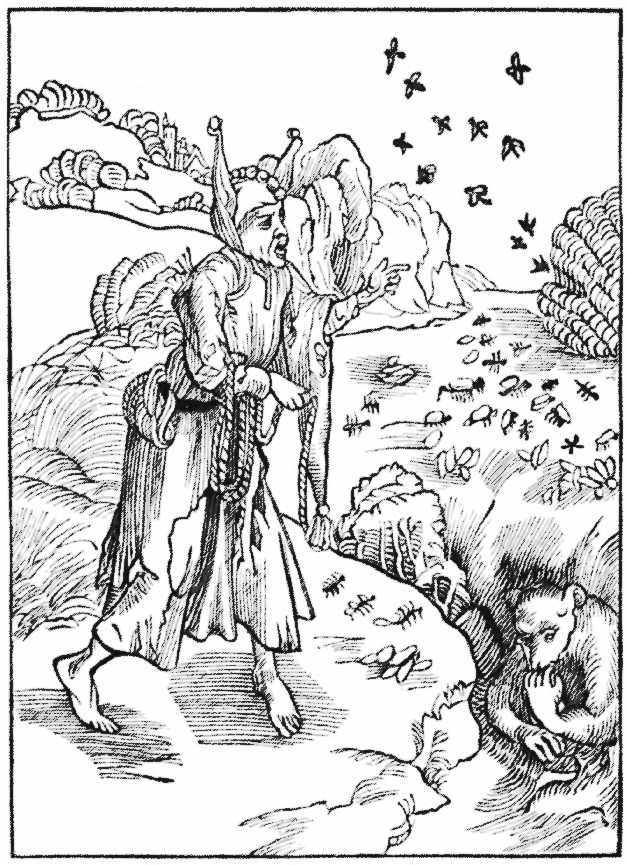
Of Folys Improuyndent

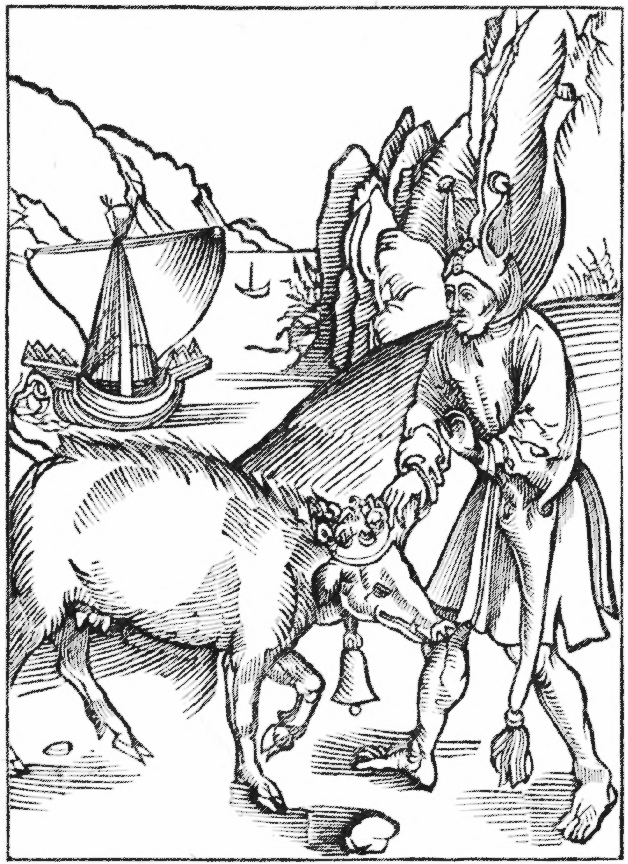
Or Vyle Langage

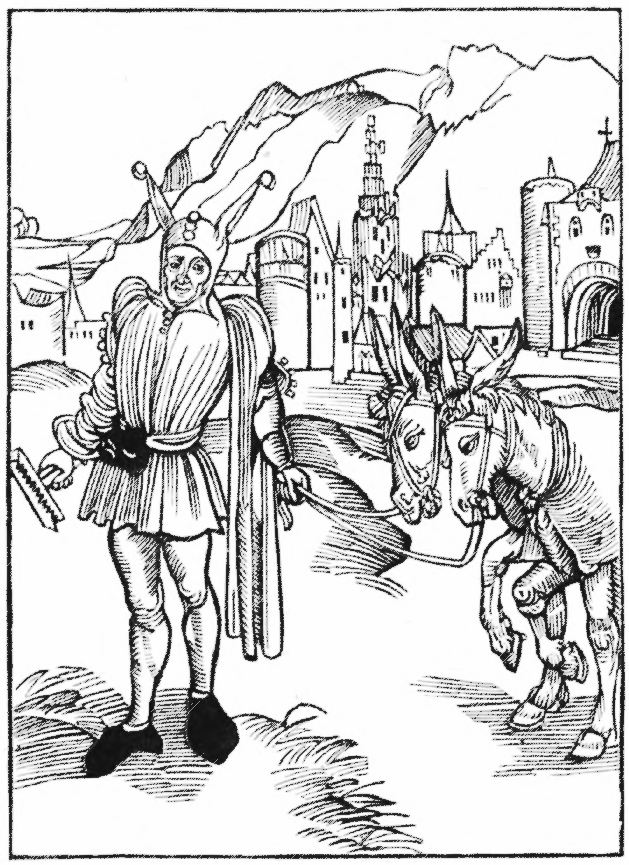
Of The Abusion Of Ye Spiritualte

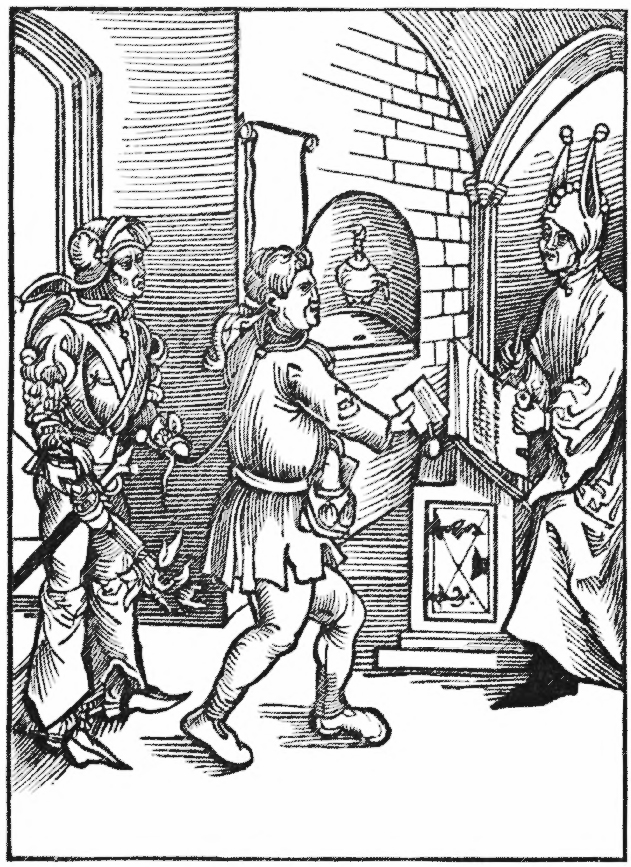
Of The Extorcion Of Men Of Warre, Scrybes And Other Offycers

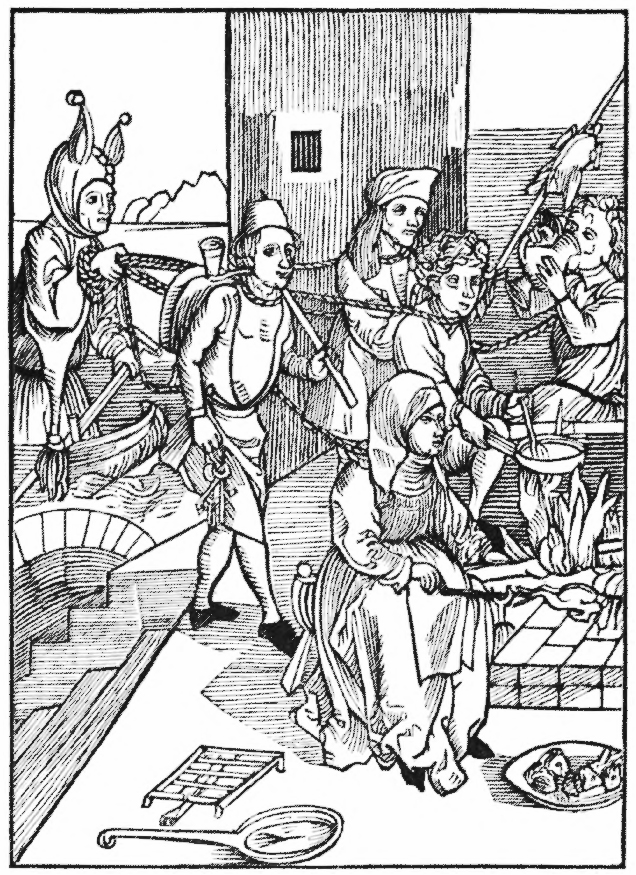
Of The Foly Of Cokes, Butlers, And Other Oflycers Of Housholde

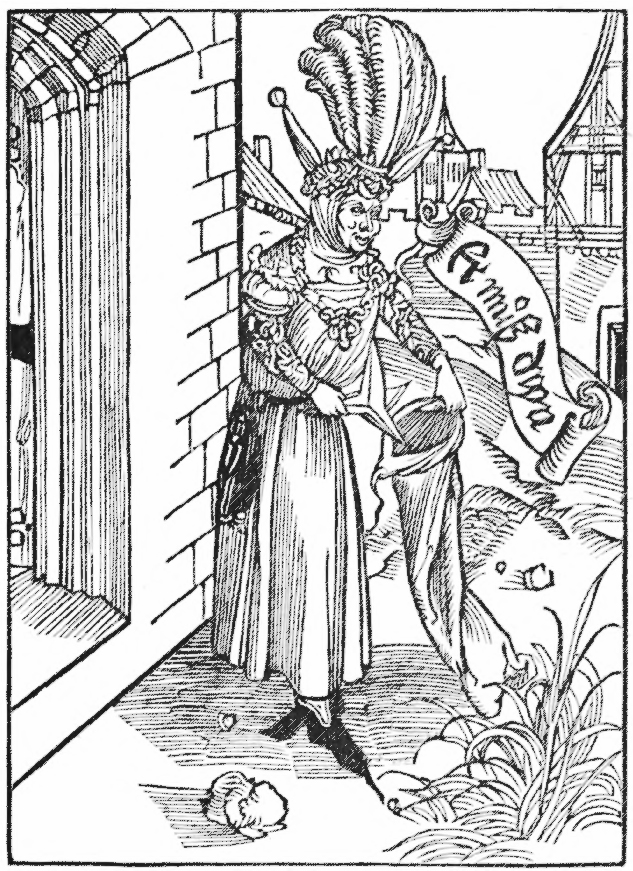
Of The Pryde Of Churles And Rude Men Of The Countrey

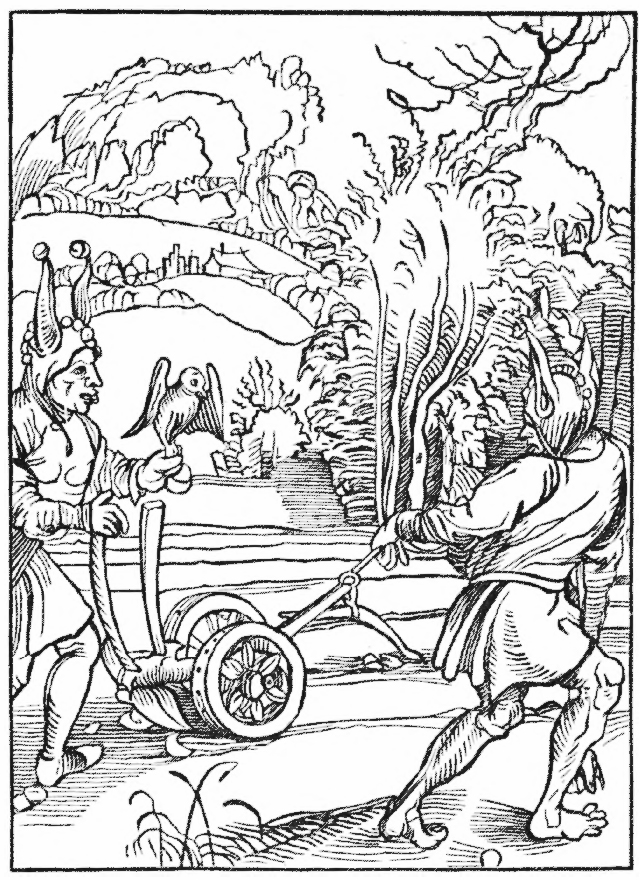
Of Nat Folowers Of Good Counsel

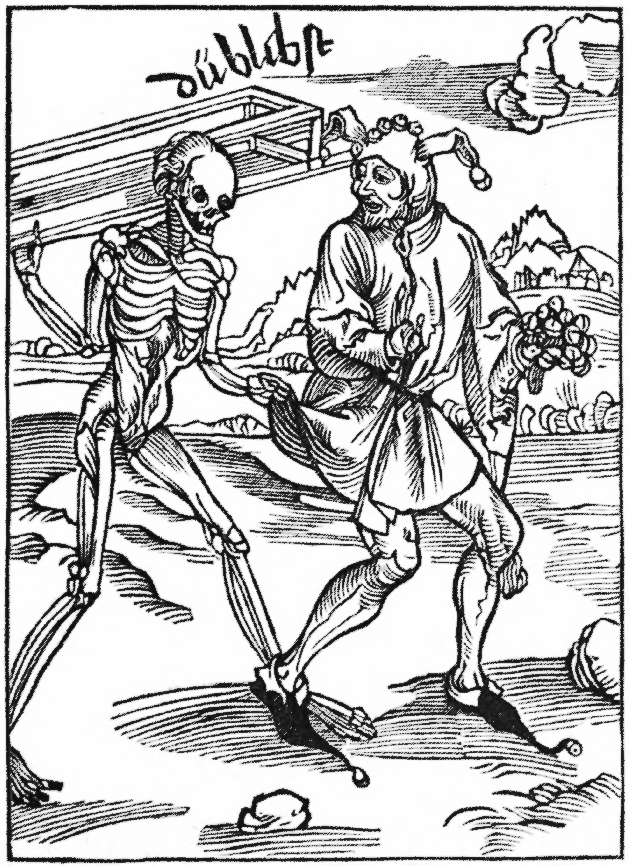
Of Folys That Despyse Deth And Make No Prouysyon Therfore

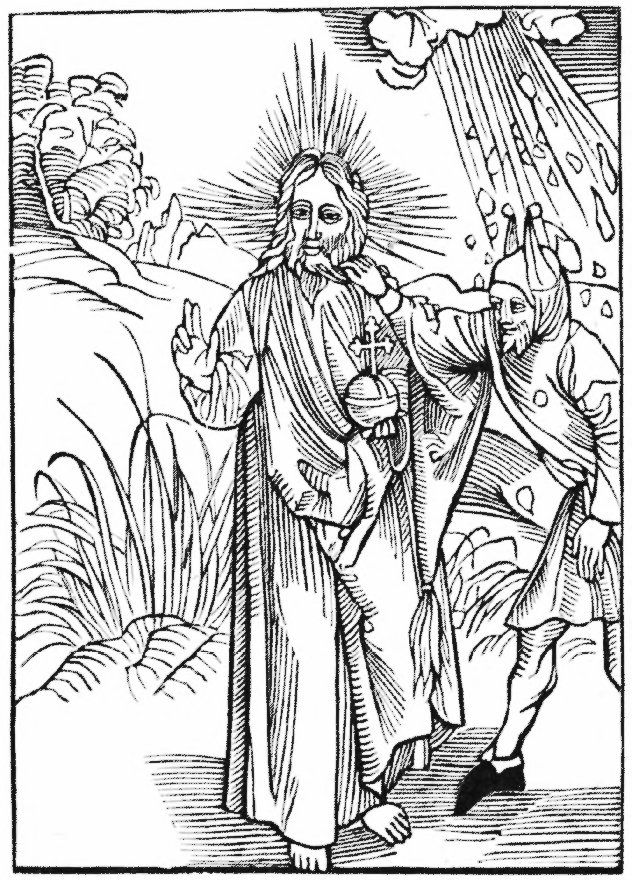
Of Folys That Despyse God

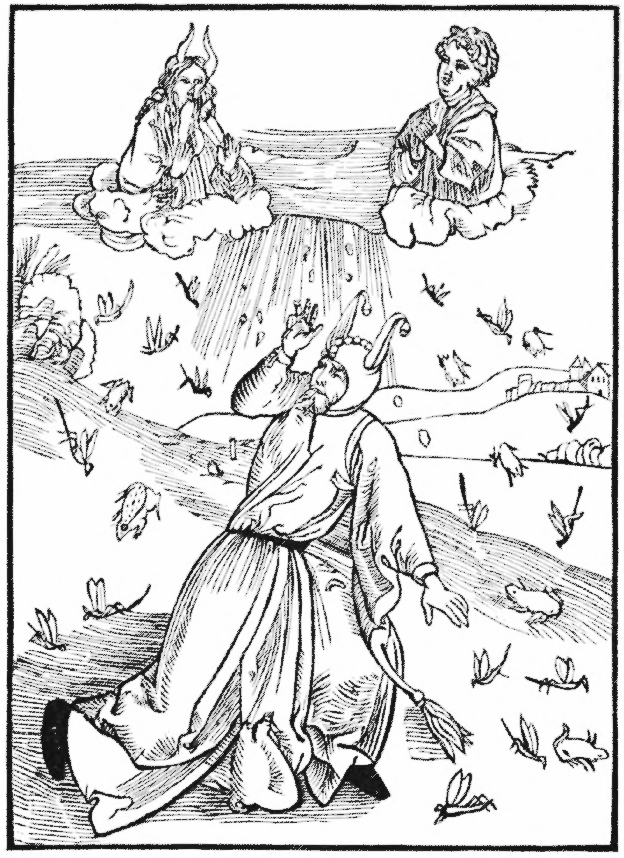
Of The Plage And Indignacyon Of God

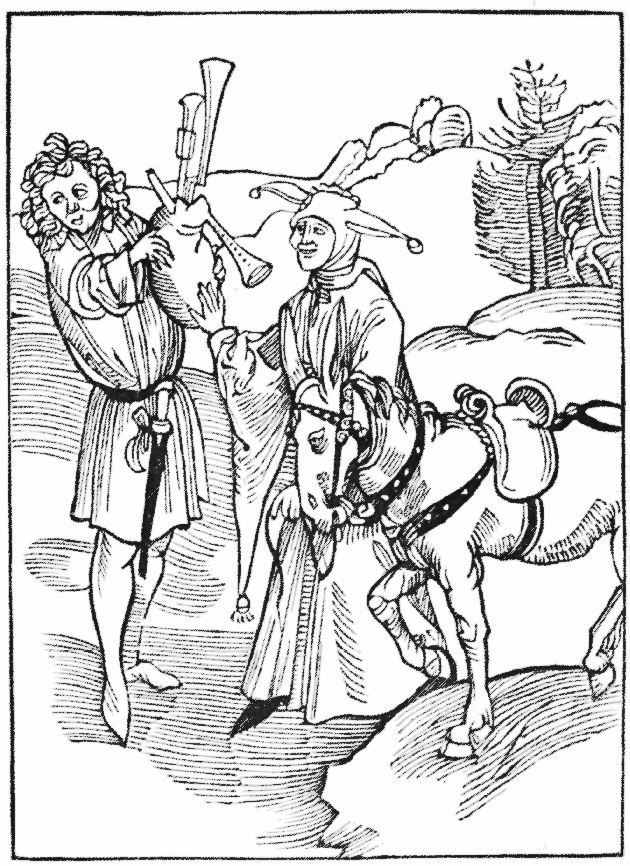
Of Folysshe Exchaunges

Of Children That Dysdayne To Honoure And Worshyp Theyr Parentis

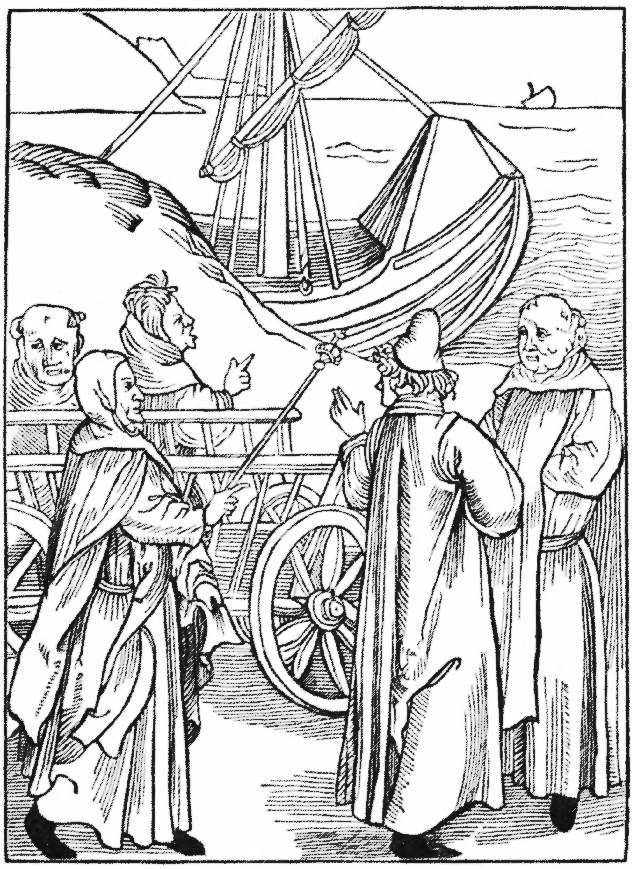
Of Claterynge And Vayne Langage Vsyd Of Prestes And Clerkes In The Quere

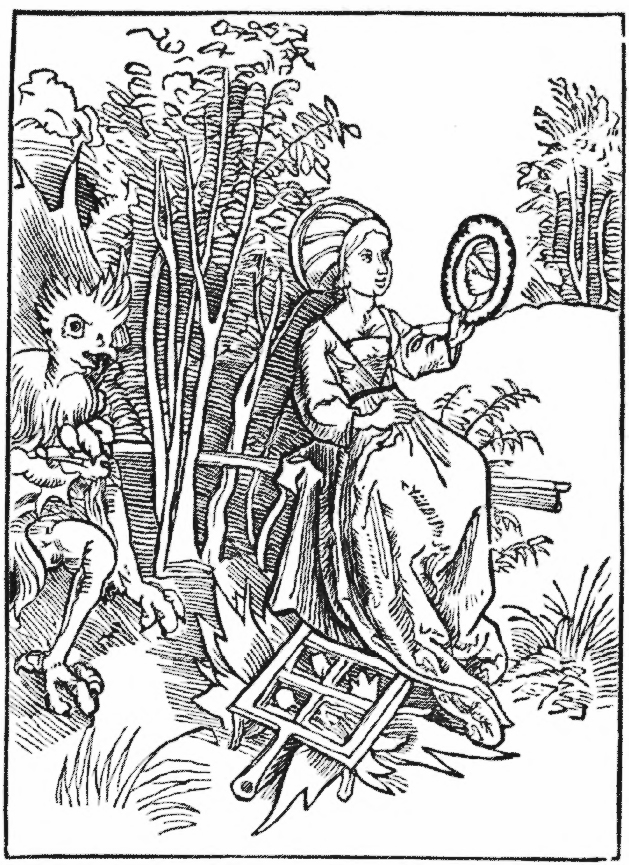
Of The Elacion Or Bostynge Of Pryde

Of Vsures And Okerers

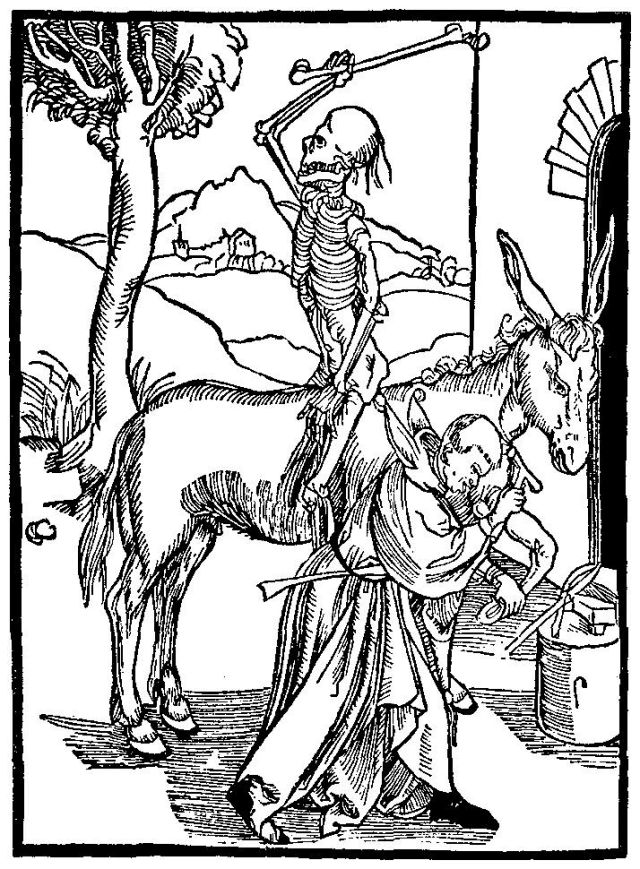
Of The Vayne Hope That Folys Haue To Succede To Herytage Of Men Yet Lyuynge

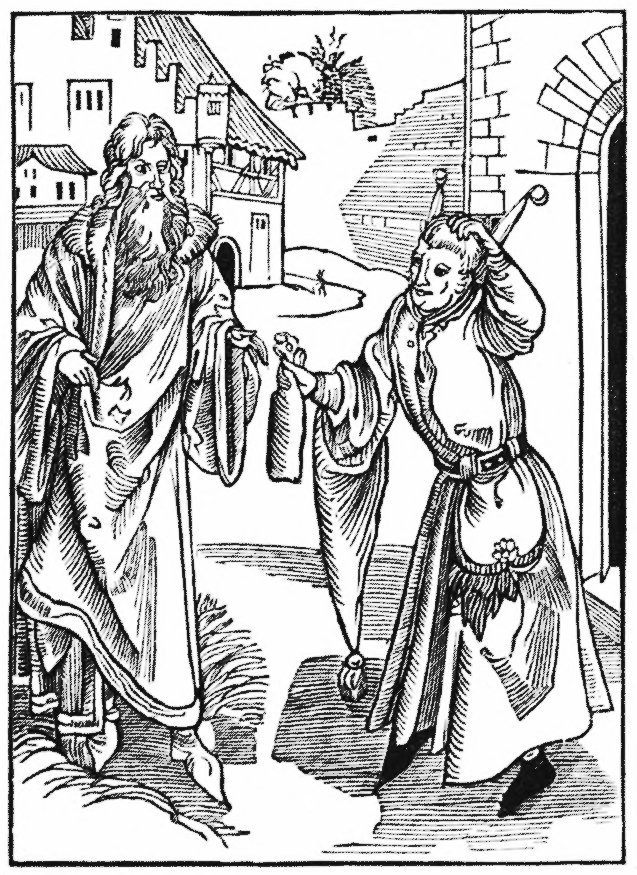
Of Folys That Gyue And That After Repent Of That They Haue Gyuen

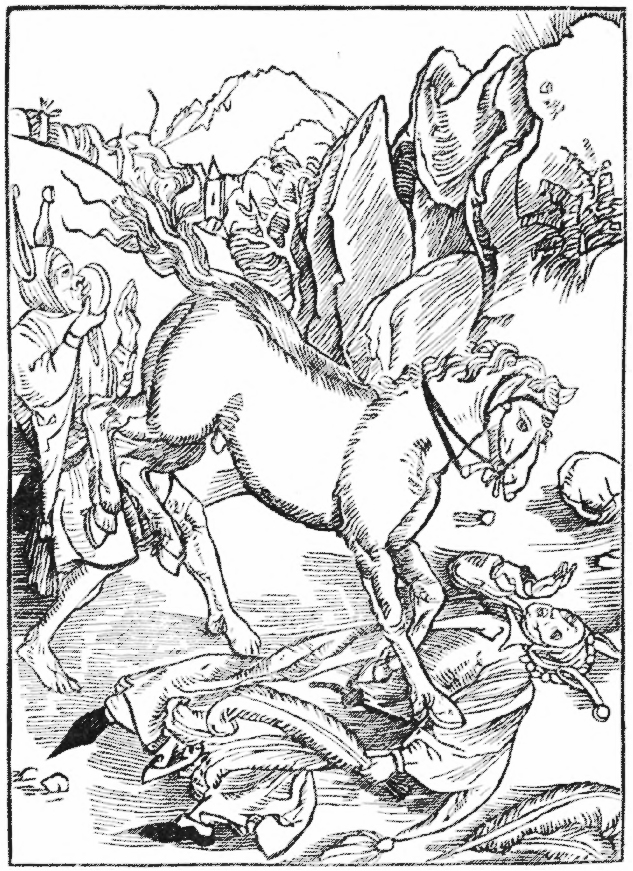
Of Flaterers And Glosers

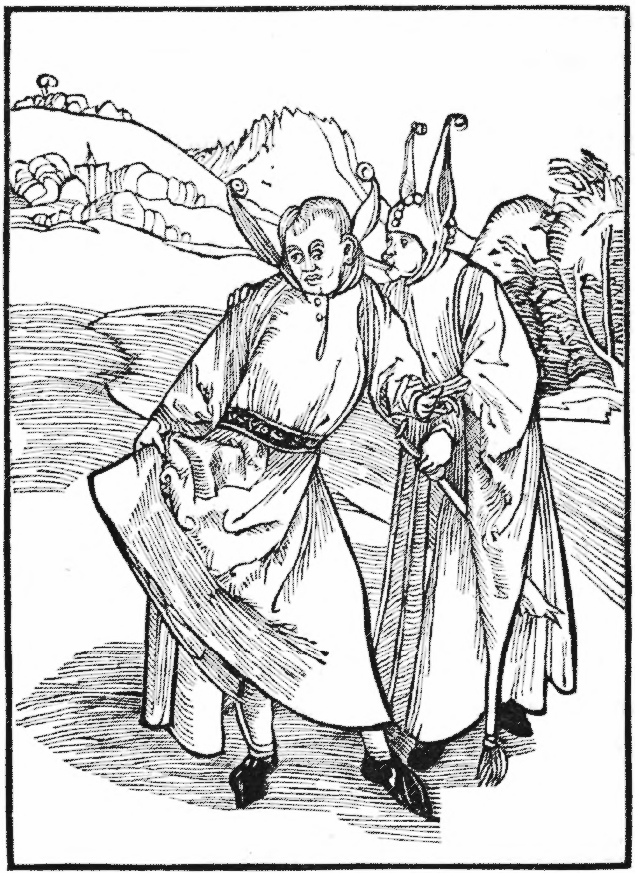
Of Taleberers And Folys Of Lyght Credence Vnto The Same

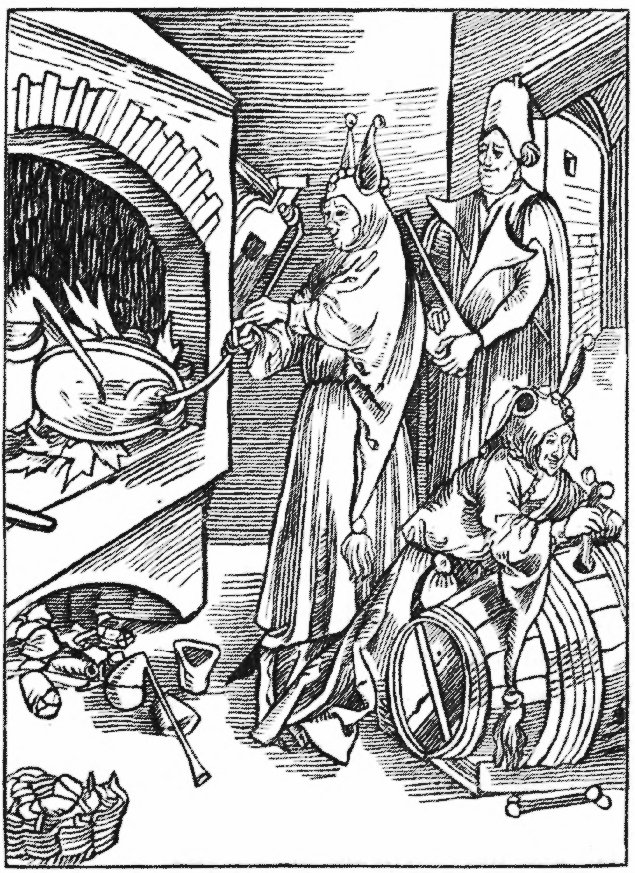
Of Marchauntis And Other Occupyers That Vse Falshode And Gyle

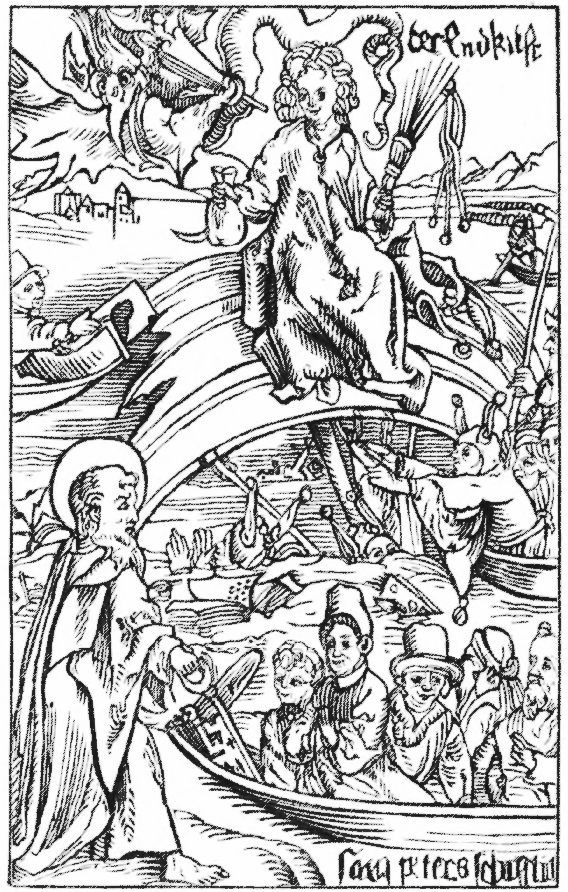
Of The Falshode Of Antichrist

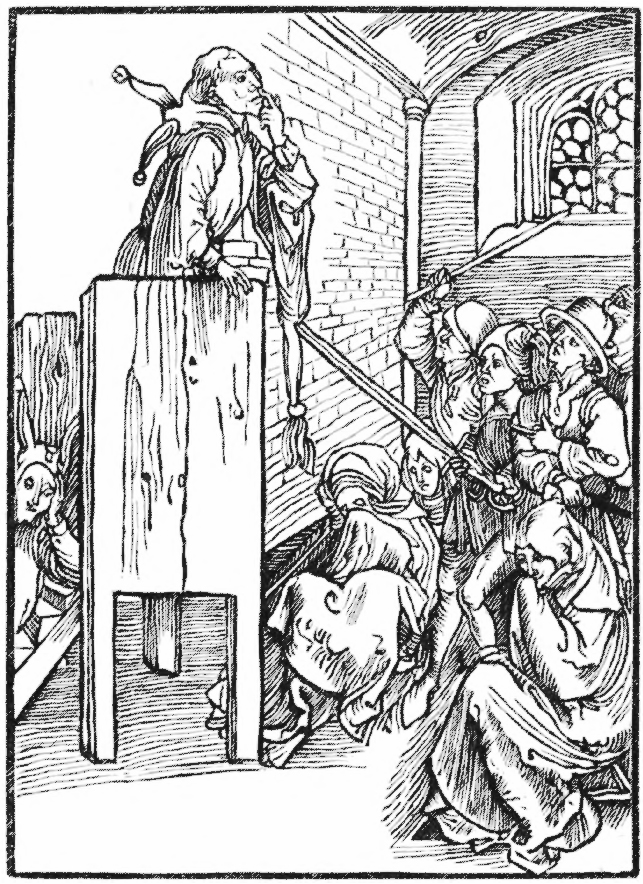
Of Hym That Dare Nat Vtter The Trouthe For Fere Of Displeasour

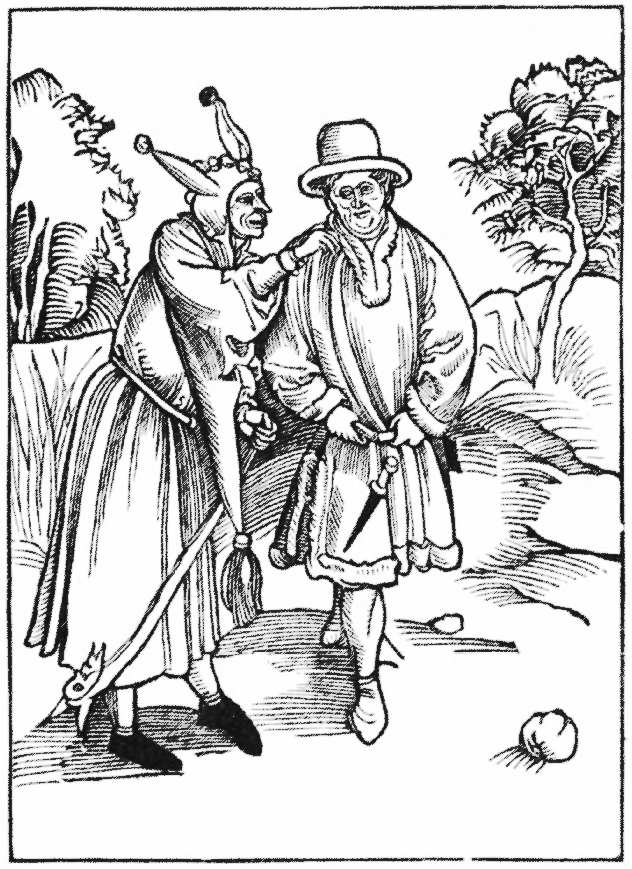
Of Suche As Withdrawe And Let Other From Good Dedes

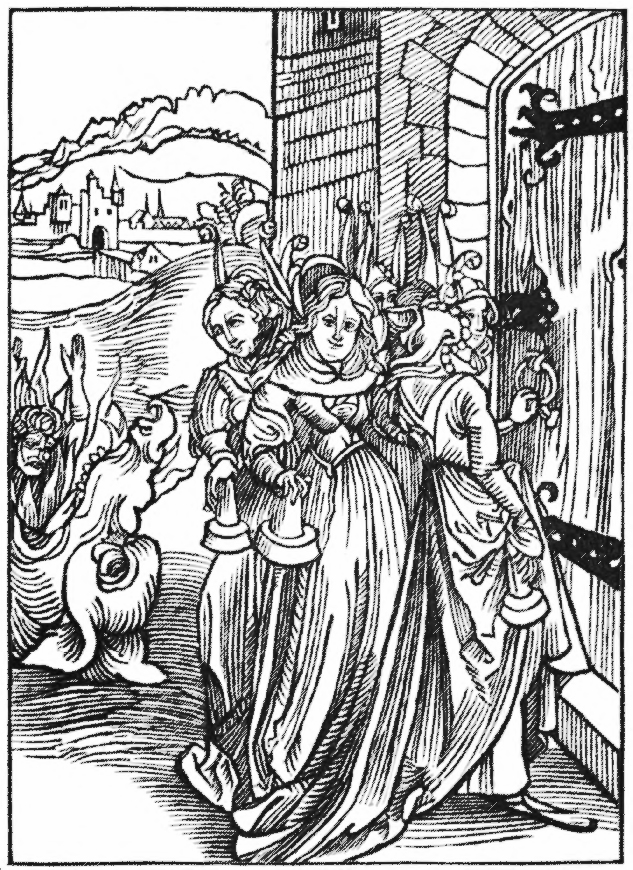
Of Leuyng Gode Warkes Vndone

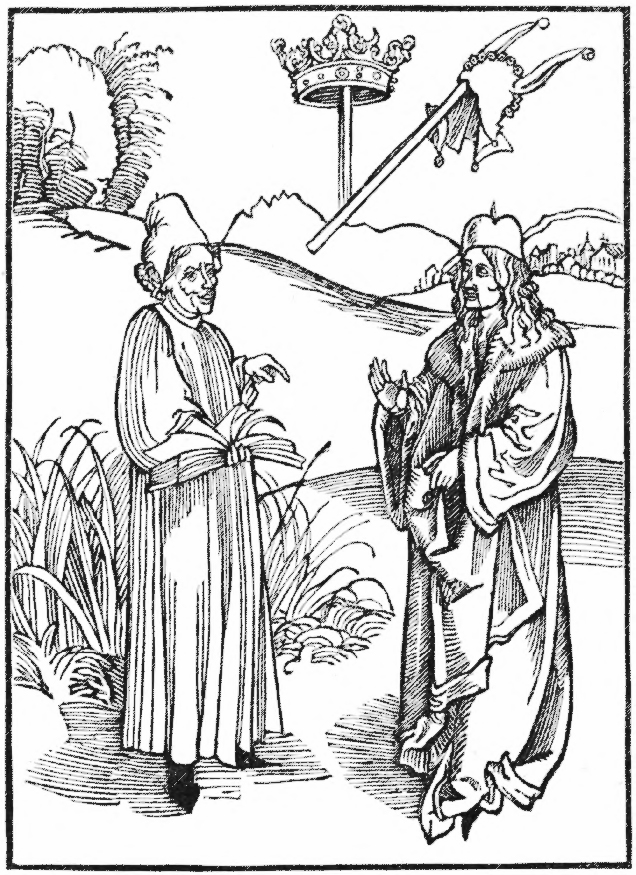
Of The Rewarde Of Wysdom

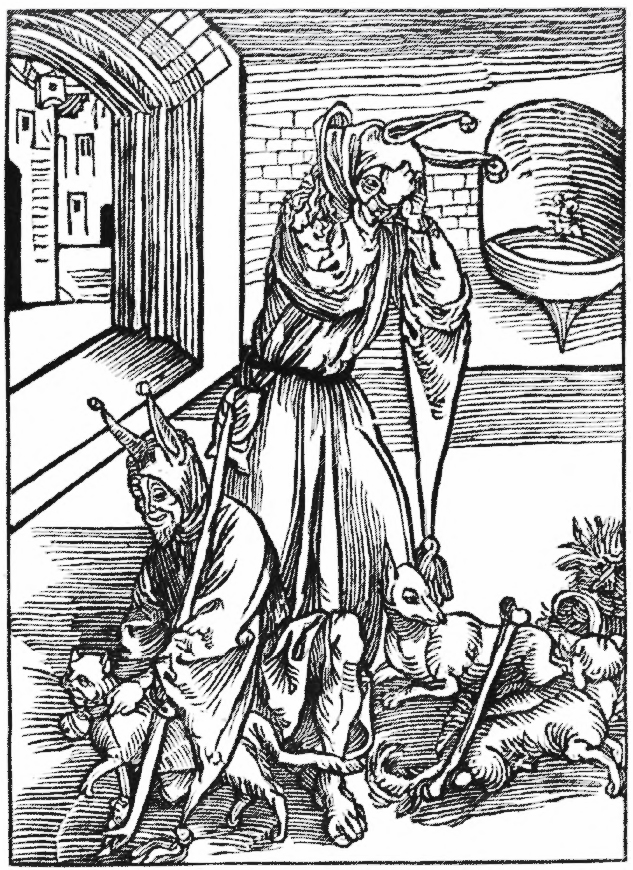
Of Bacbyters Of Good Workes And Ayenst Suche As Shall Dysprayse This Boke

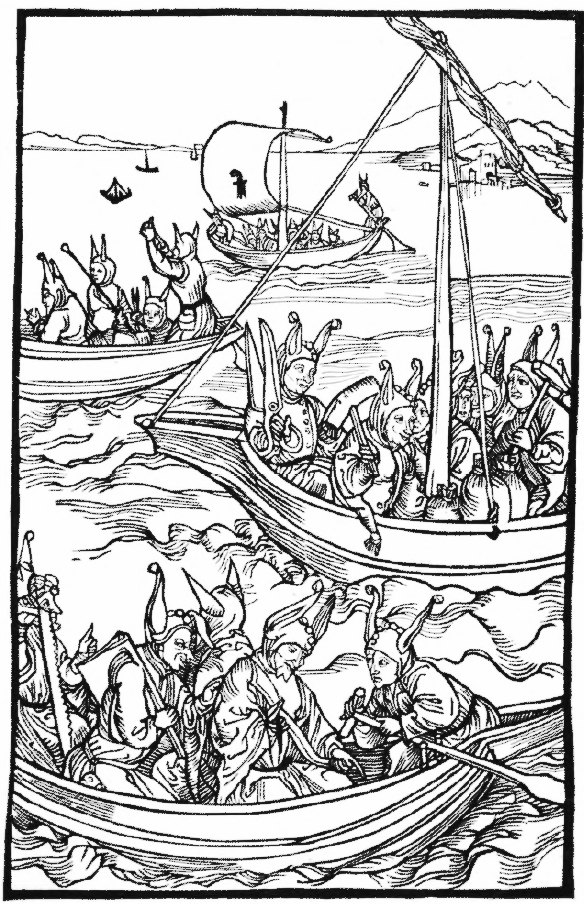
The Vnyuersall Shyp Of Craftysmen Or Laborers

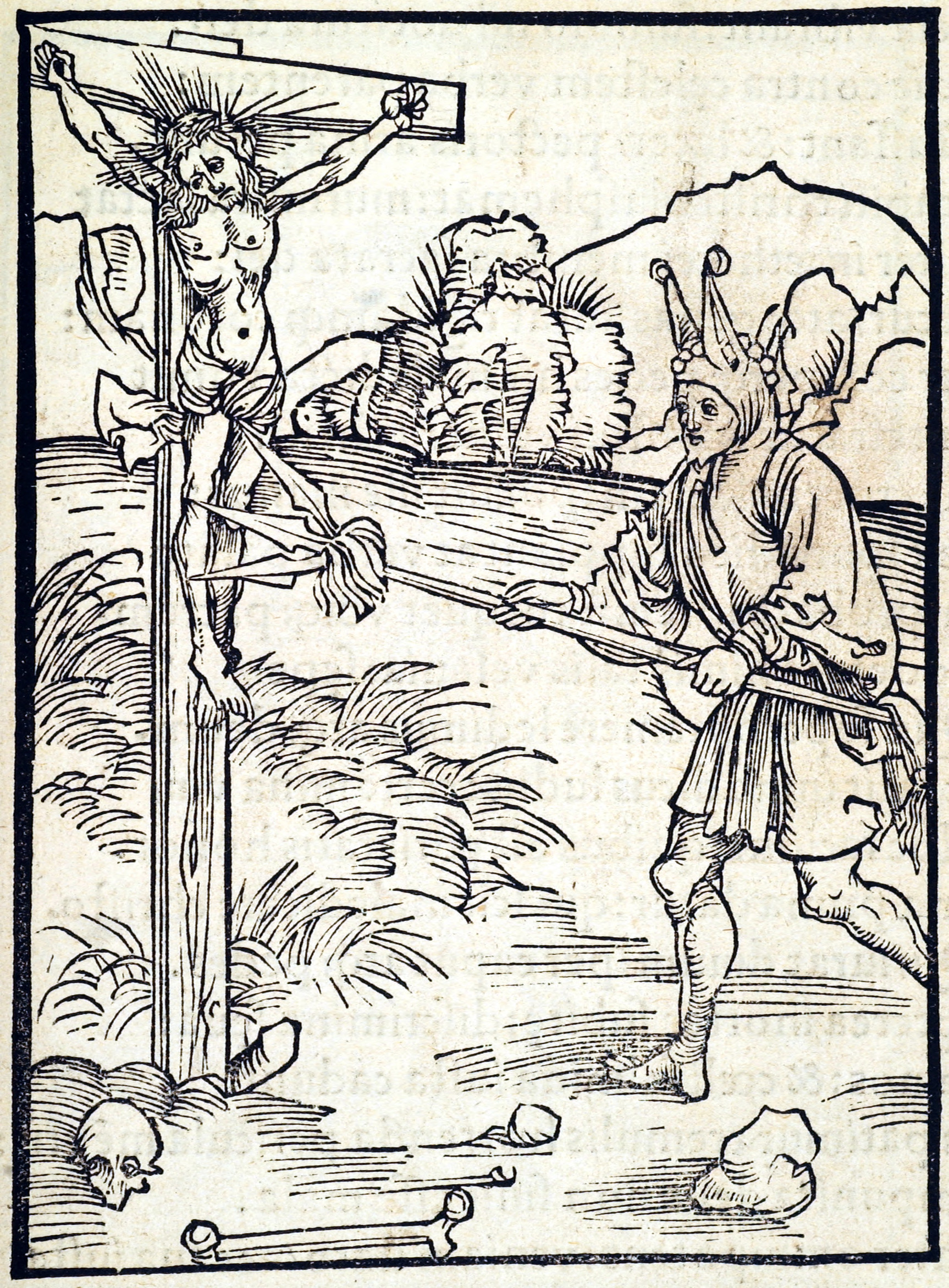
Of Blasphemers Of God

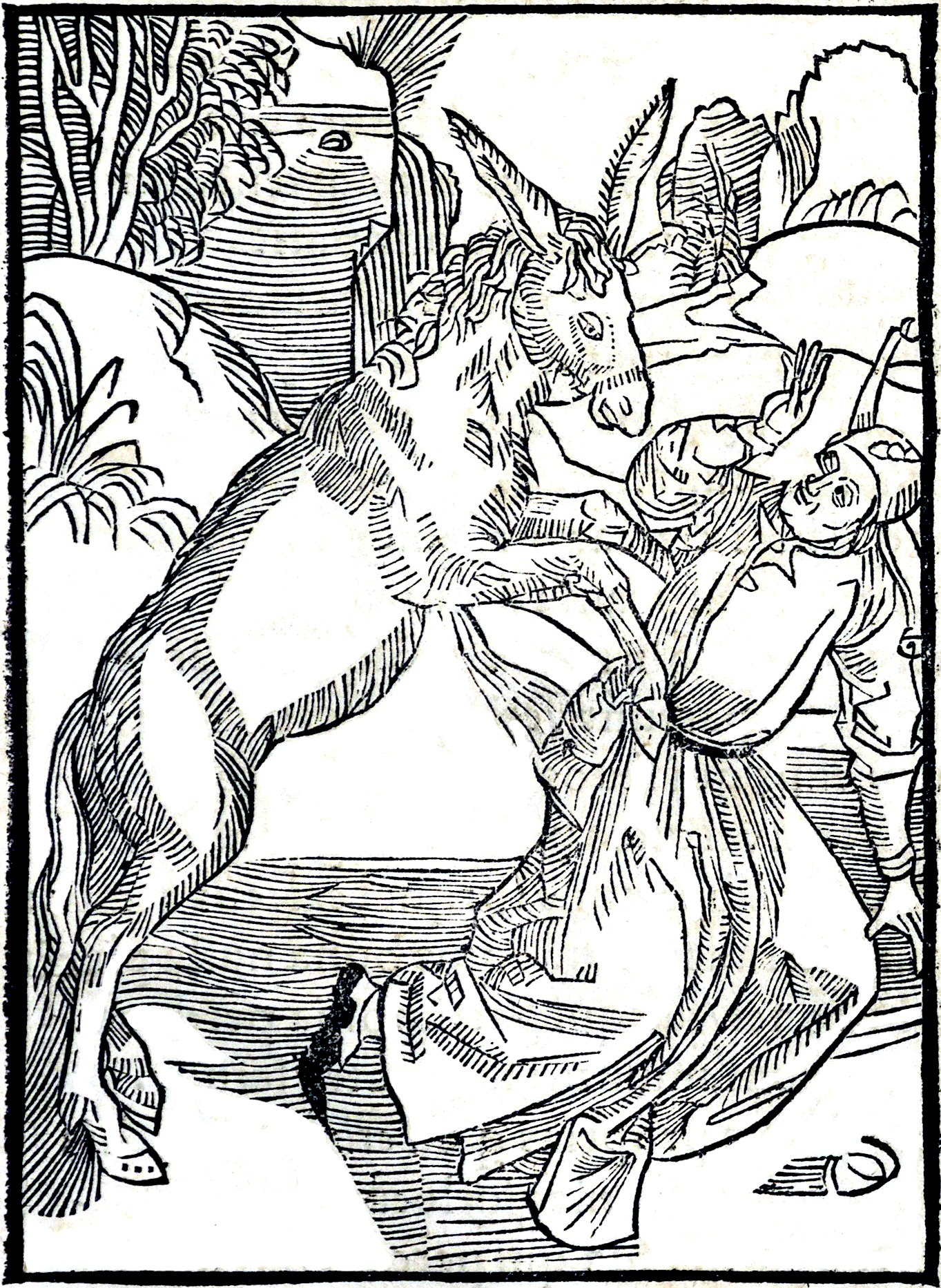
A Rehersinge Of Dyuers Sortes Of Folys Oppressyd With Theyr Owne Foly

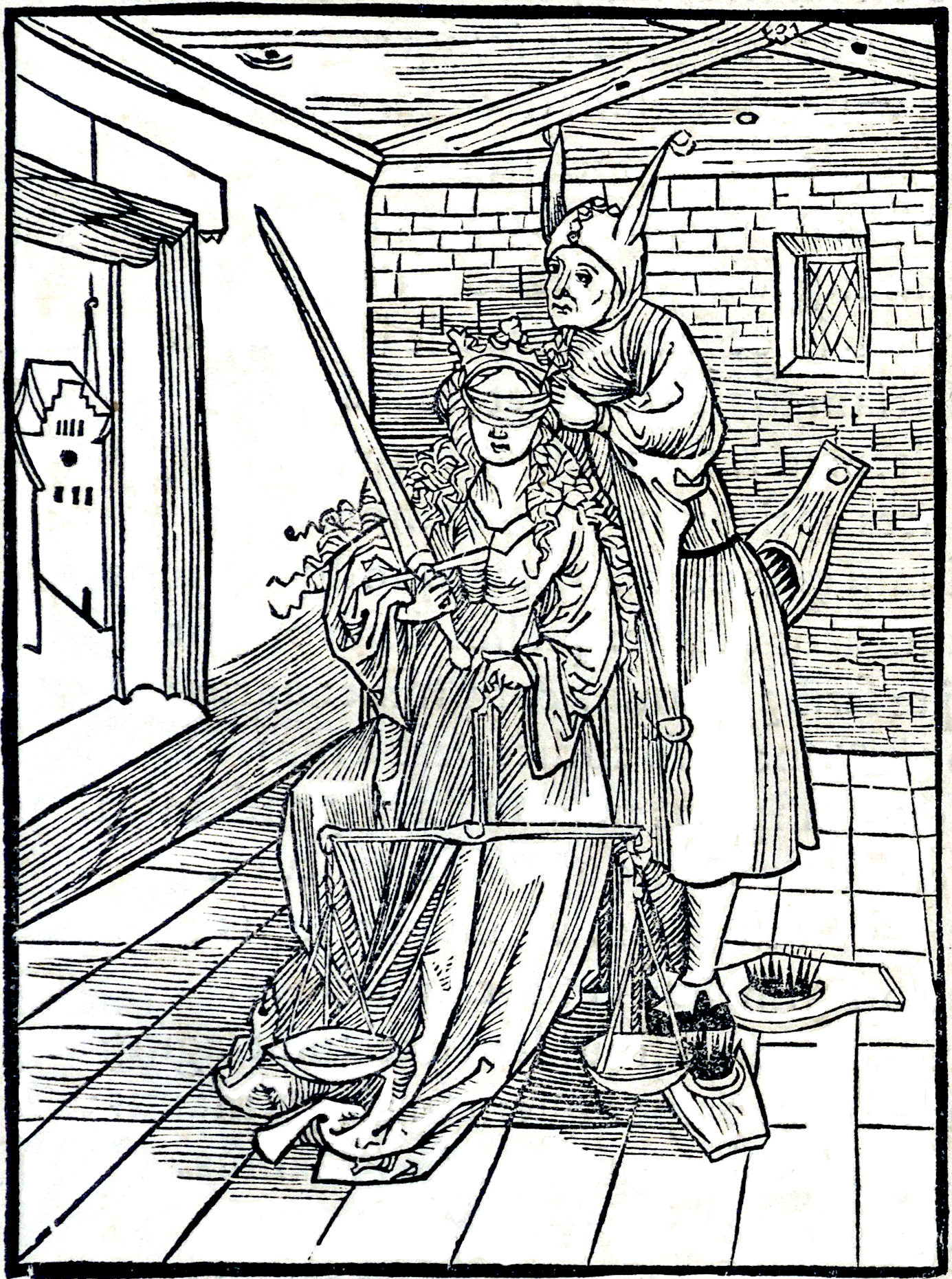
Of Folys That Stryue In The Lawe For Thynges Of Small Valour

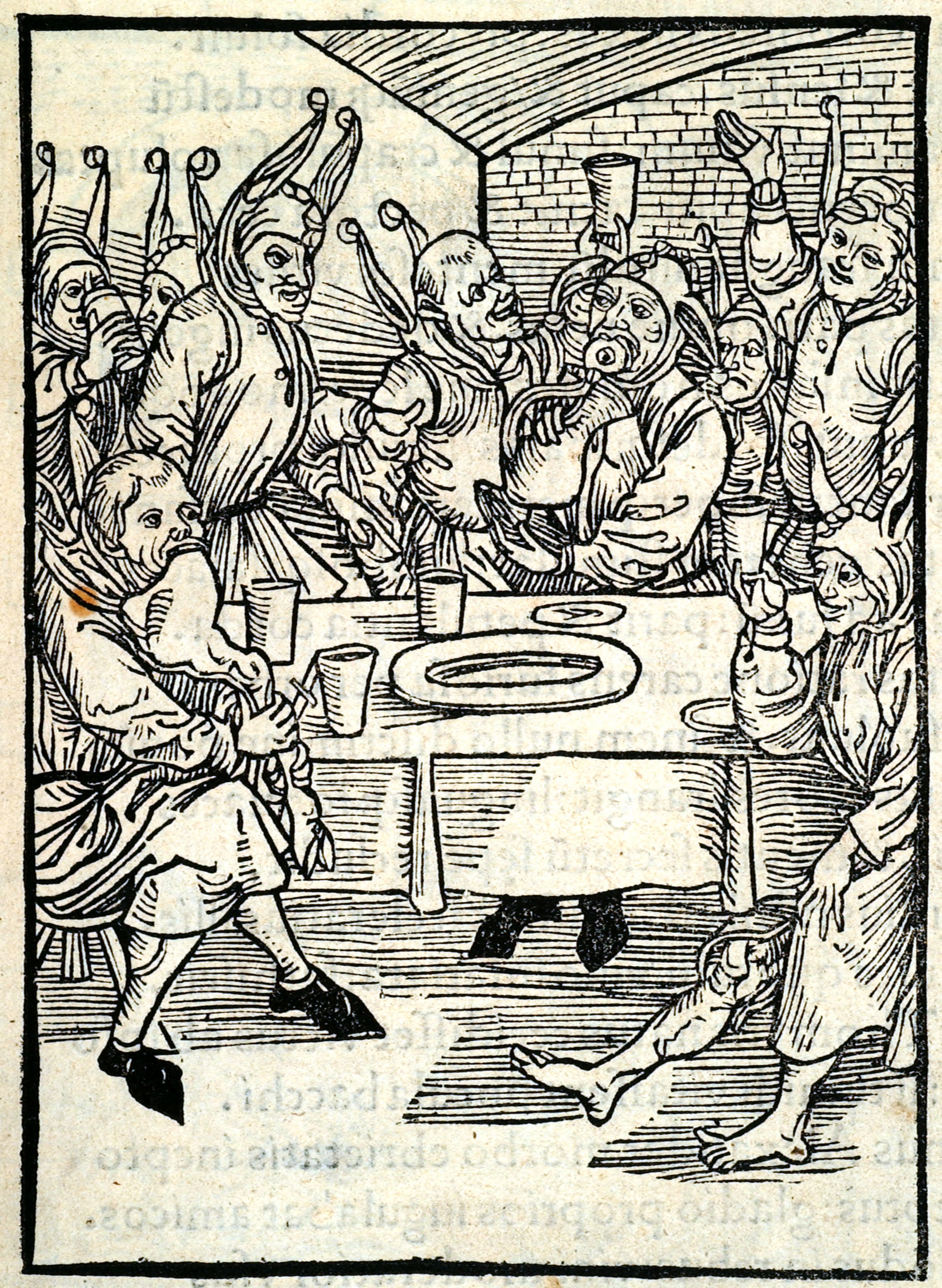
Of Glotons, And Droncardes

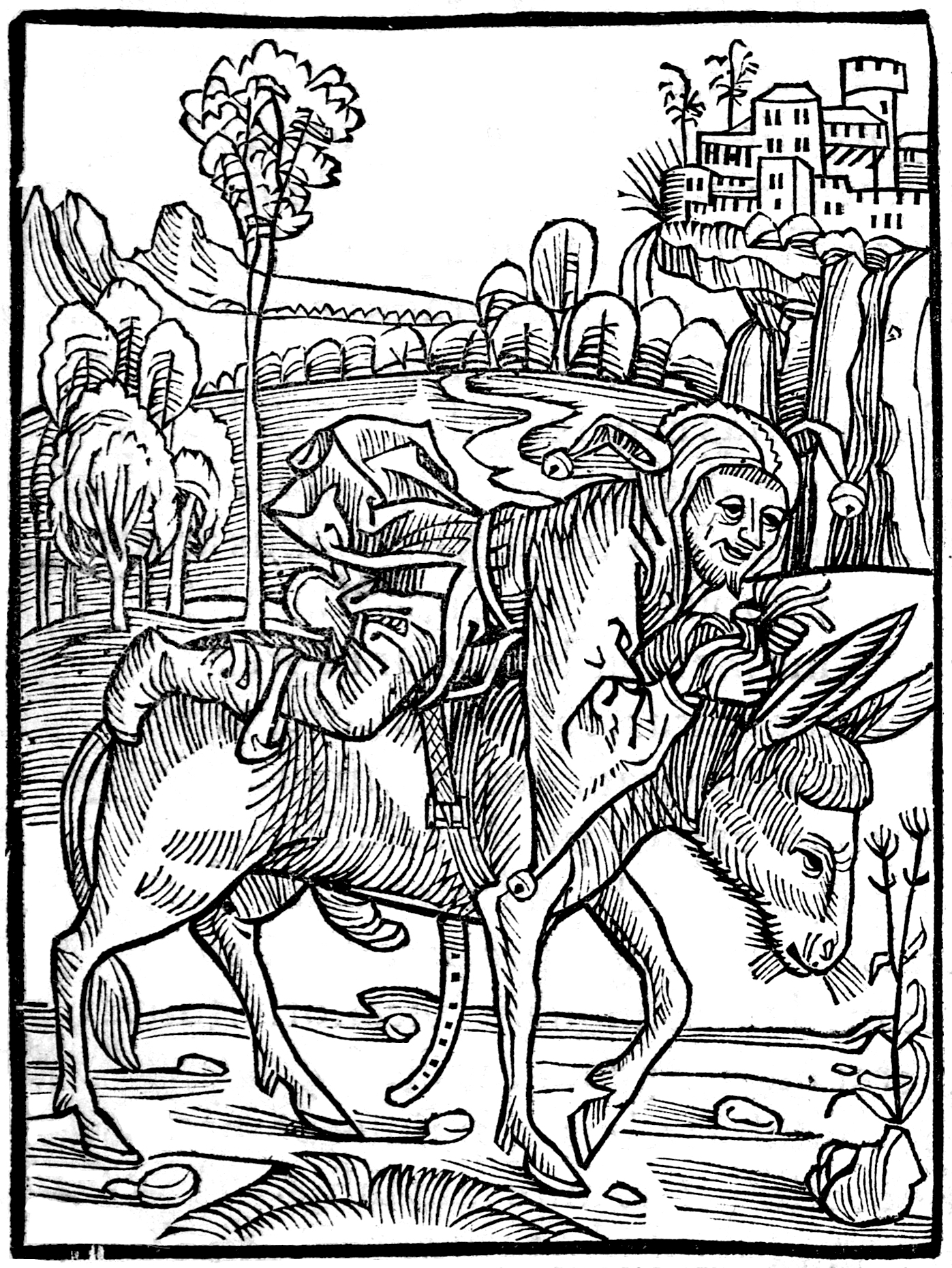
The Folly

=== Salus anime (1503) ===
full book

Set of 63 illustrations from the book "Salus anime", which are attributed to Dürer.

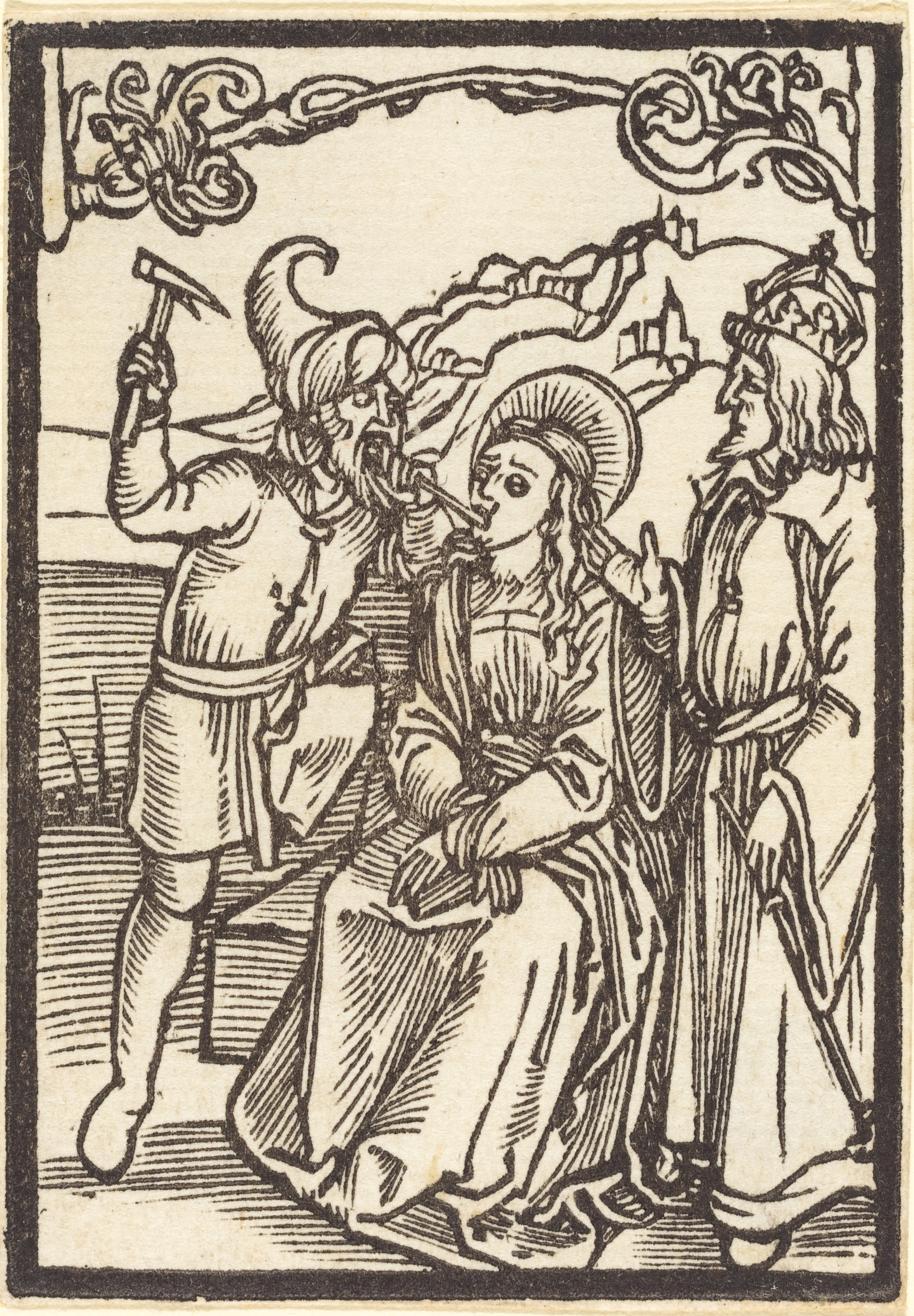
Saint Apollonia

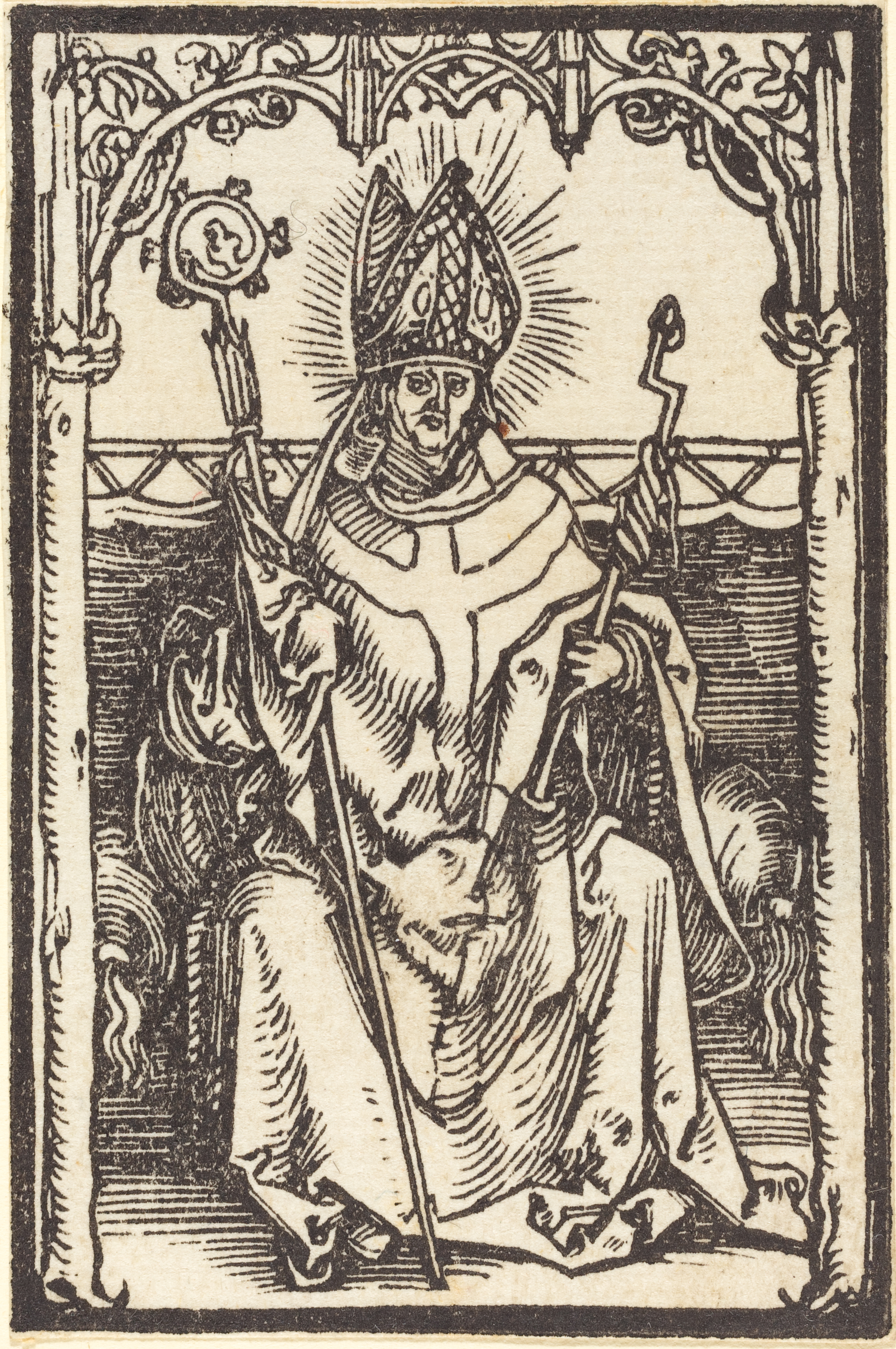
Saint Erasmus

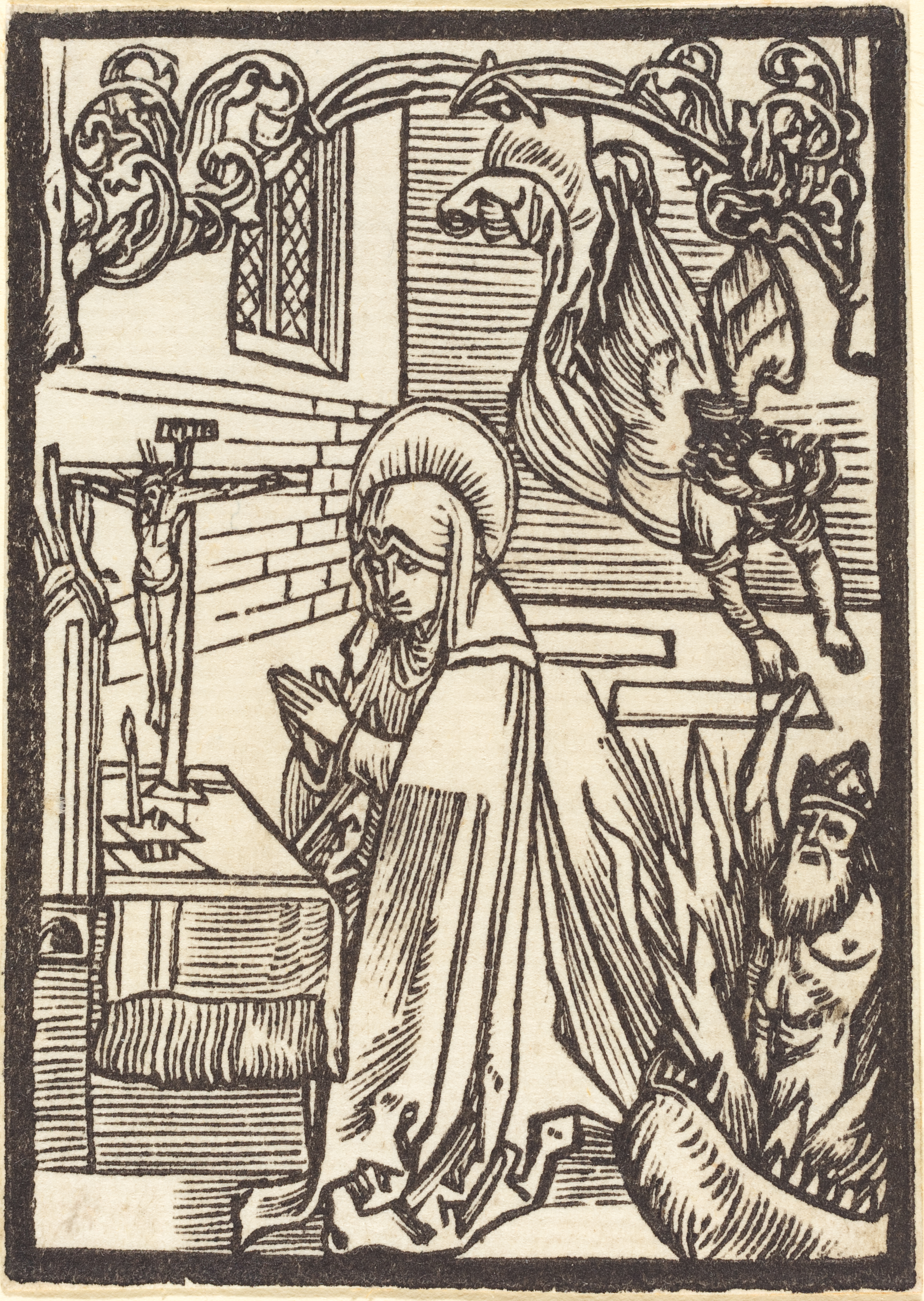
Saint Odilia

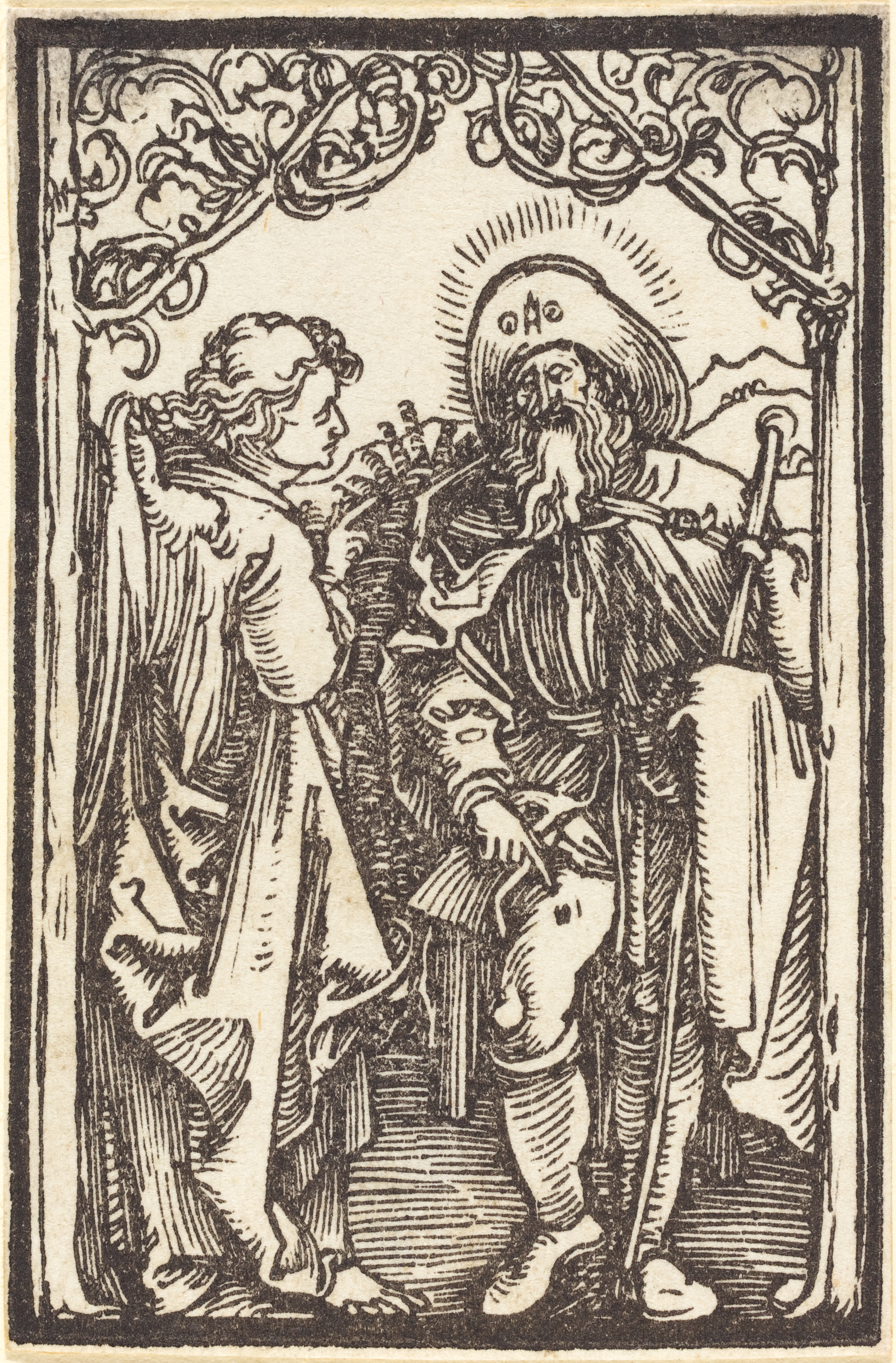
Saint Roch

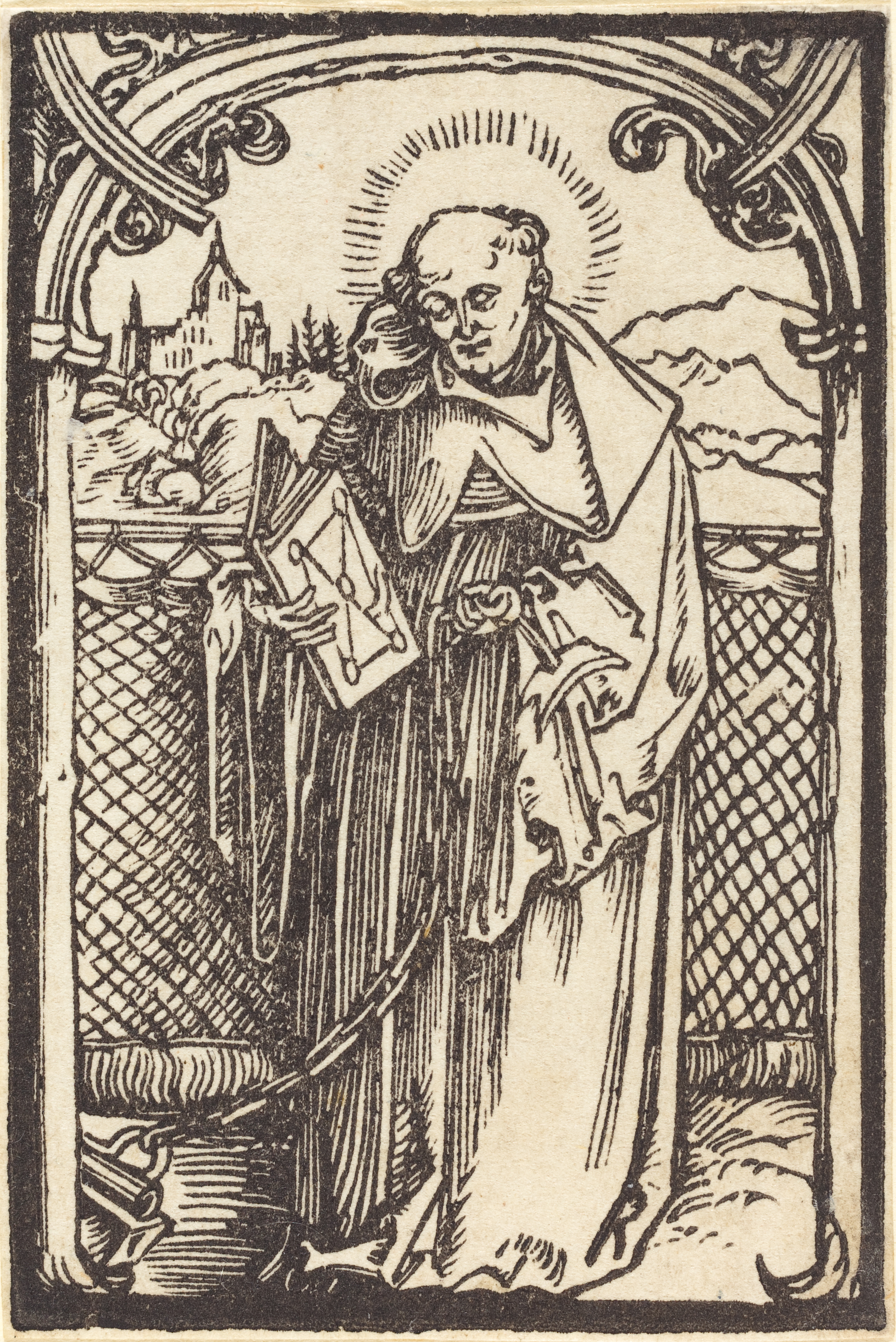
Saint Leonard

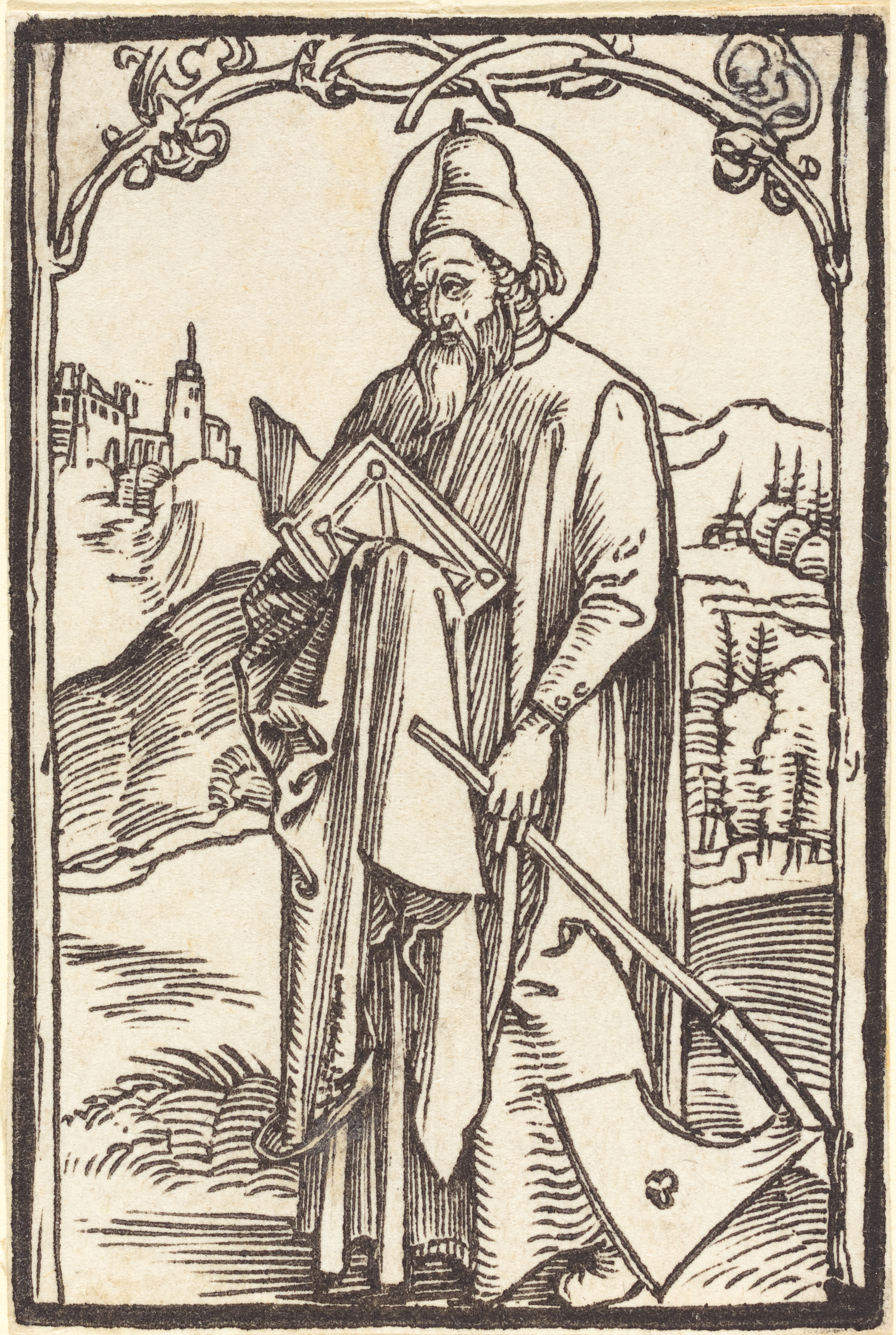
Saint Matthias

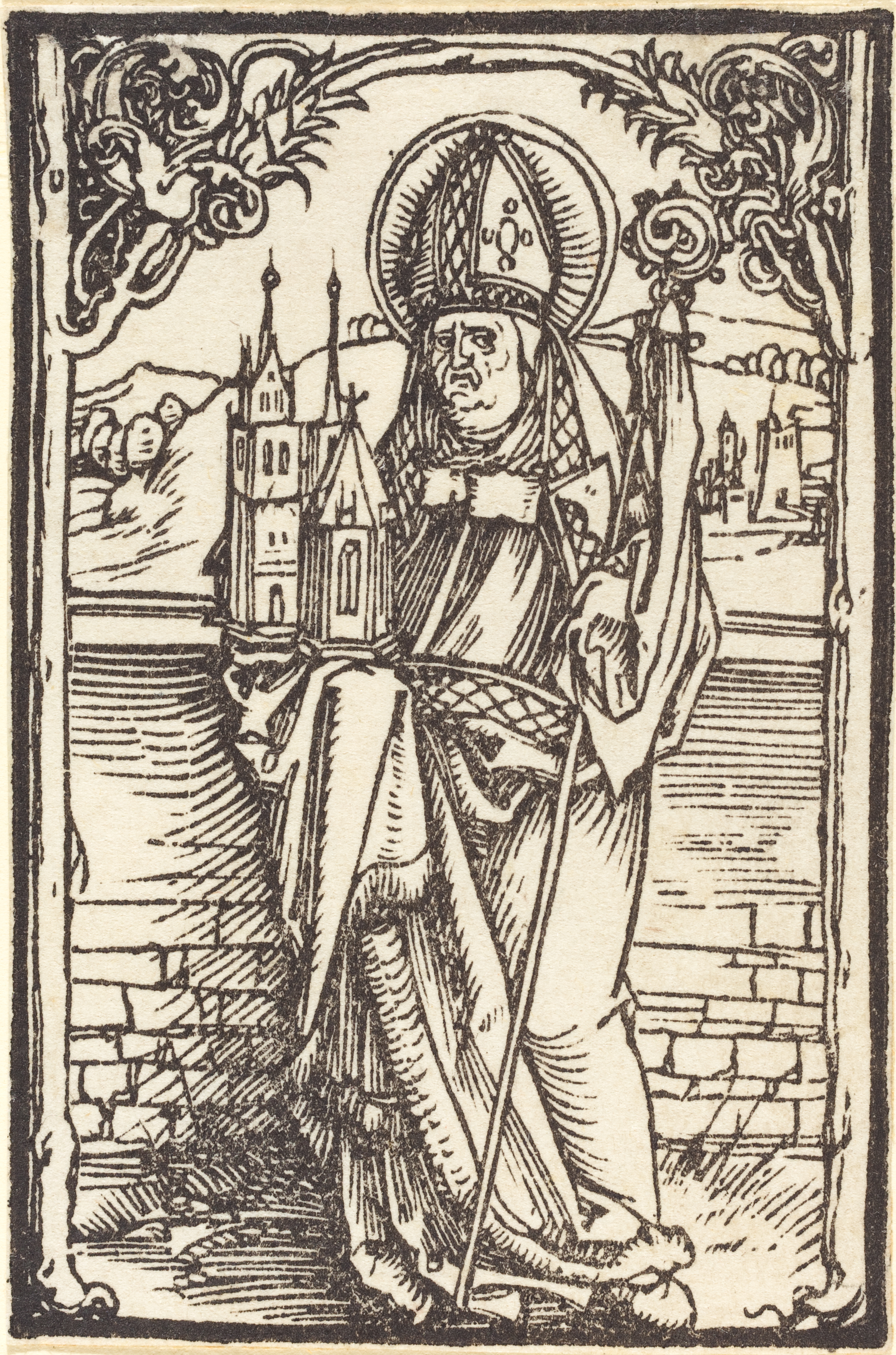
Saint Wolfgang

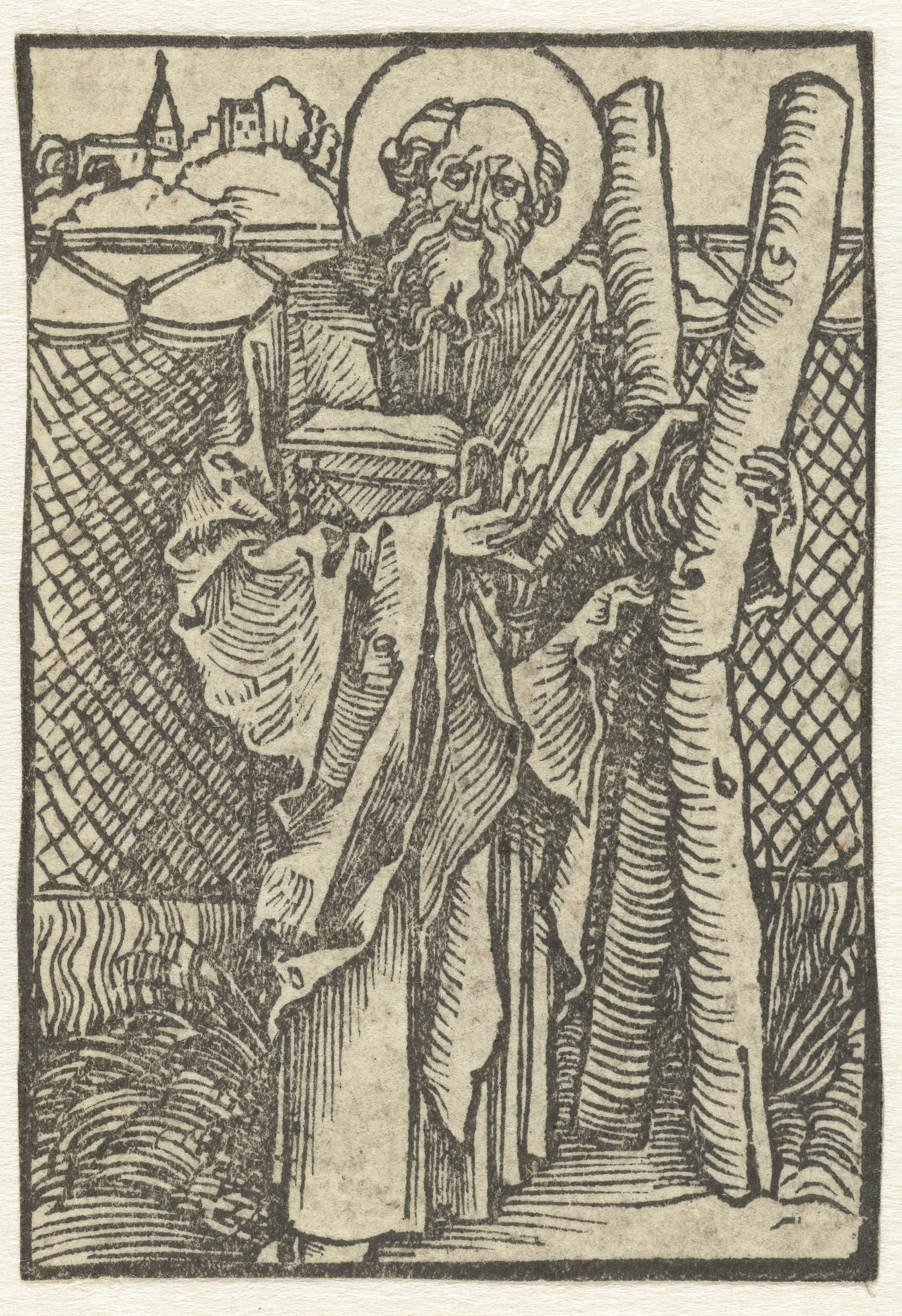
Apostle Andrew

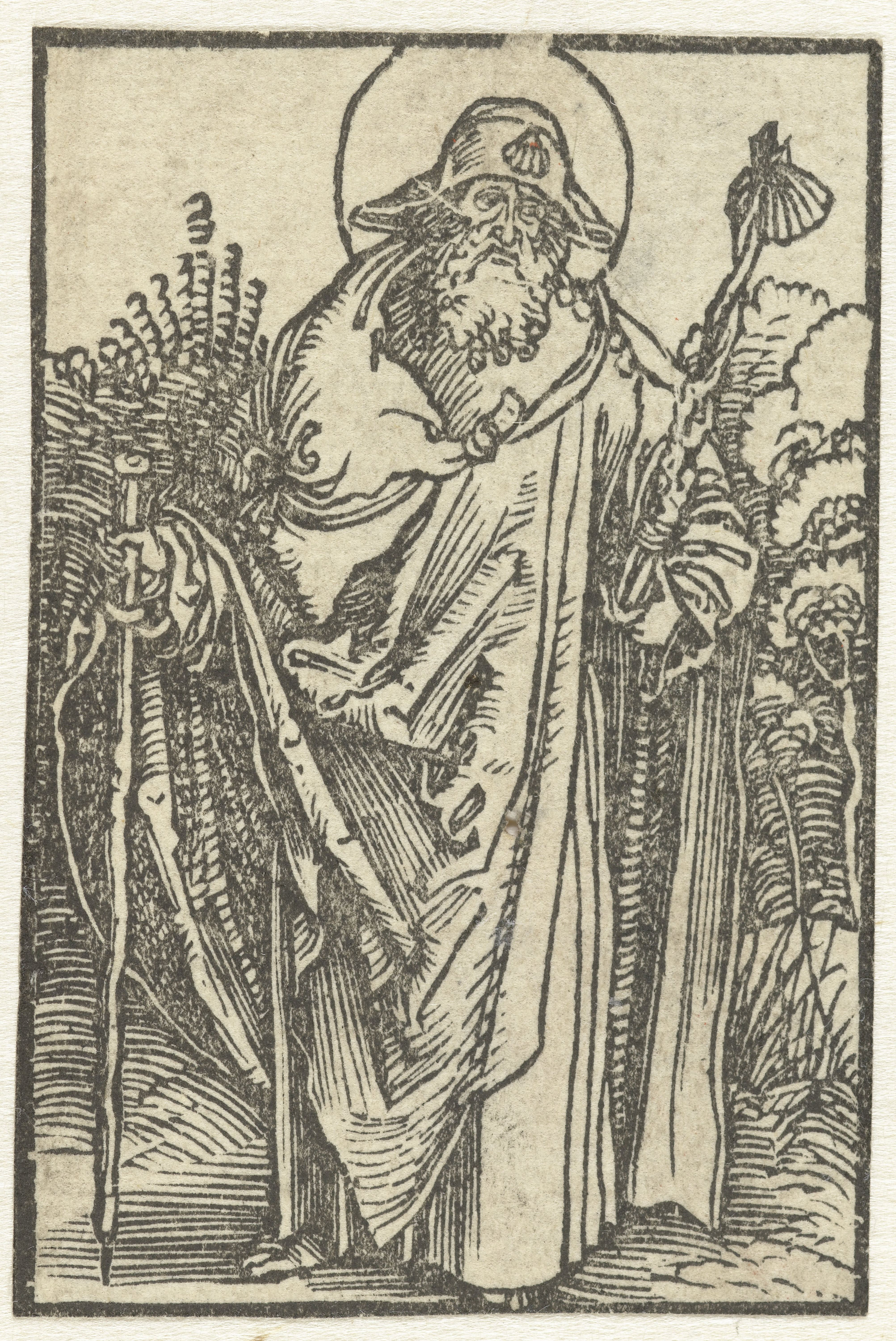
Apostle James Major

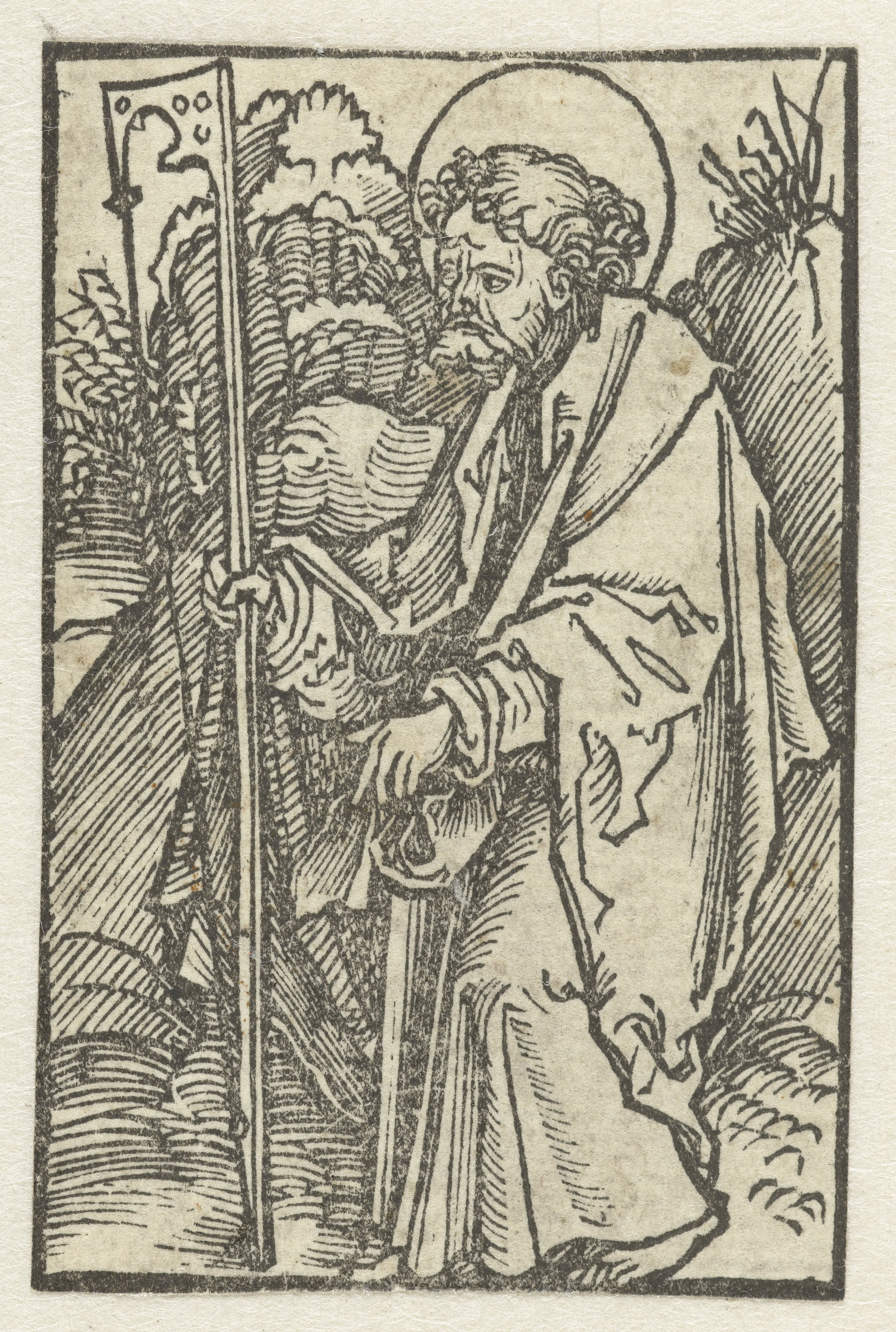
Apostle James Minor

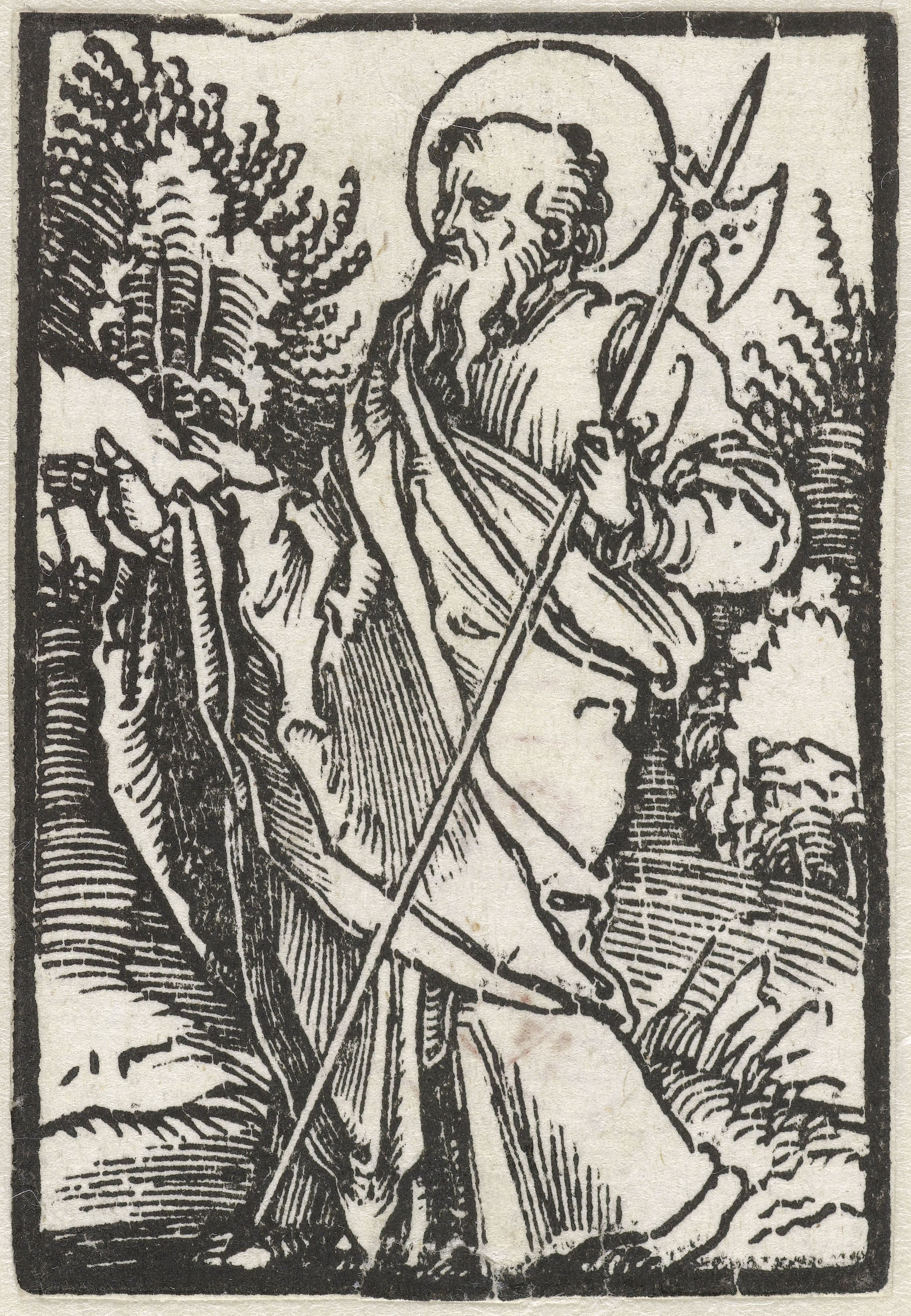
Apostle Matthew

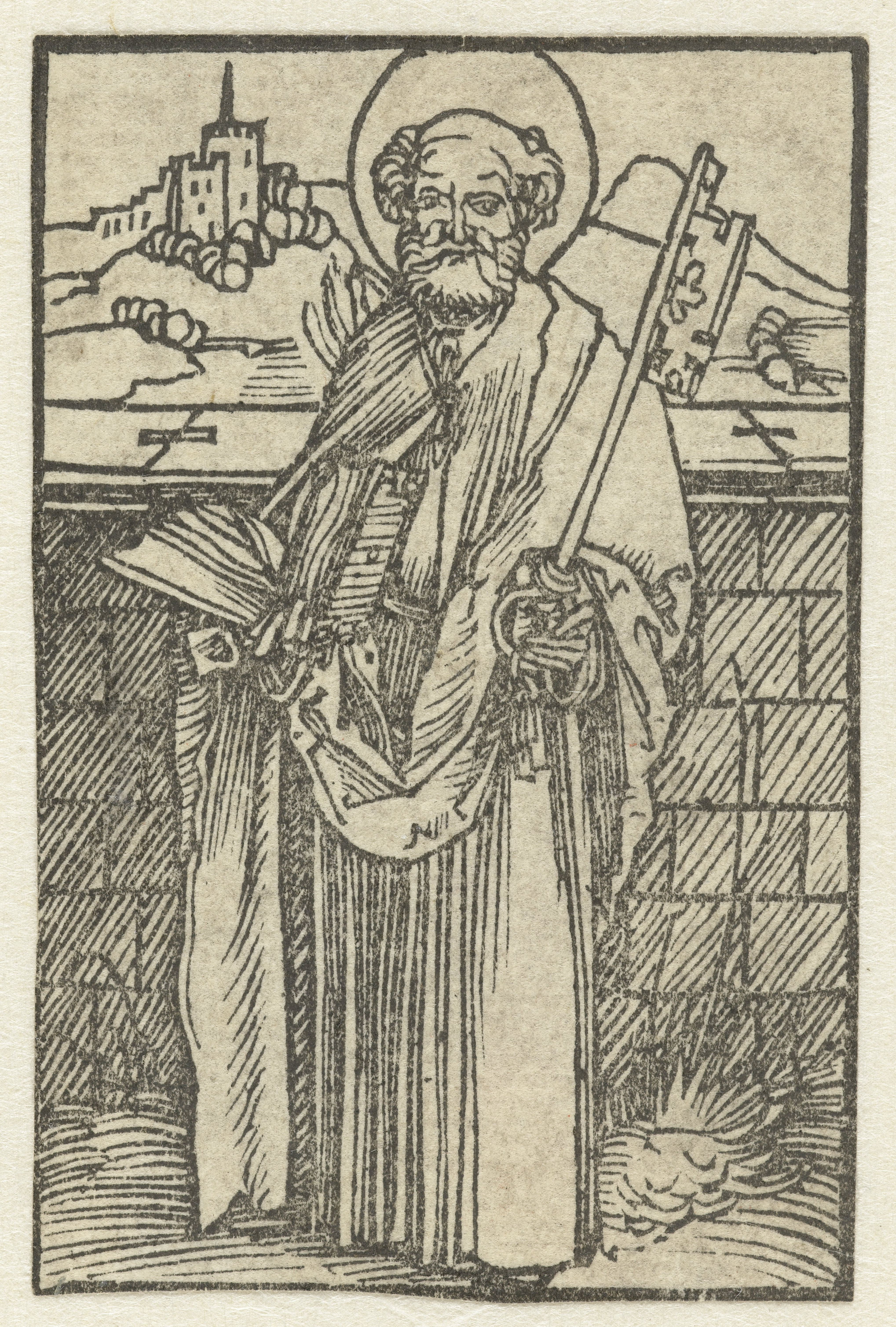
Apostle Peter

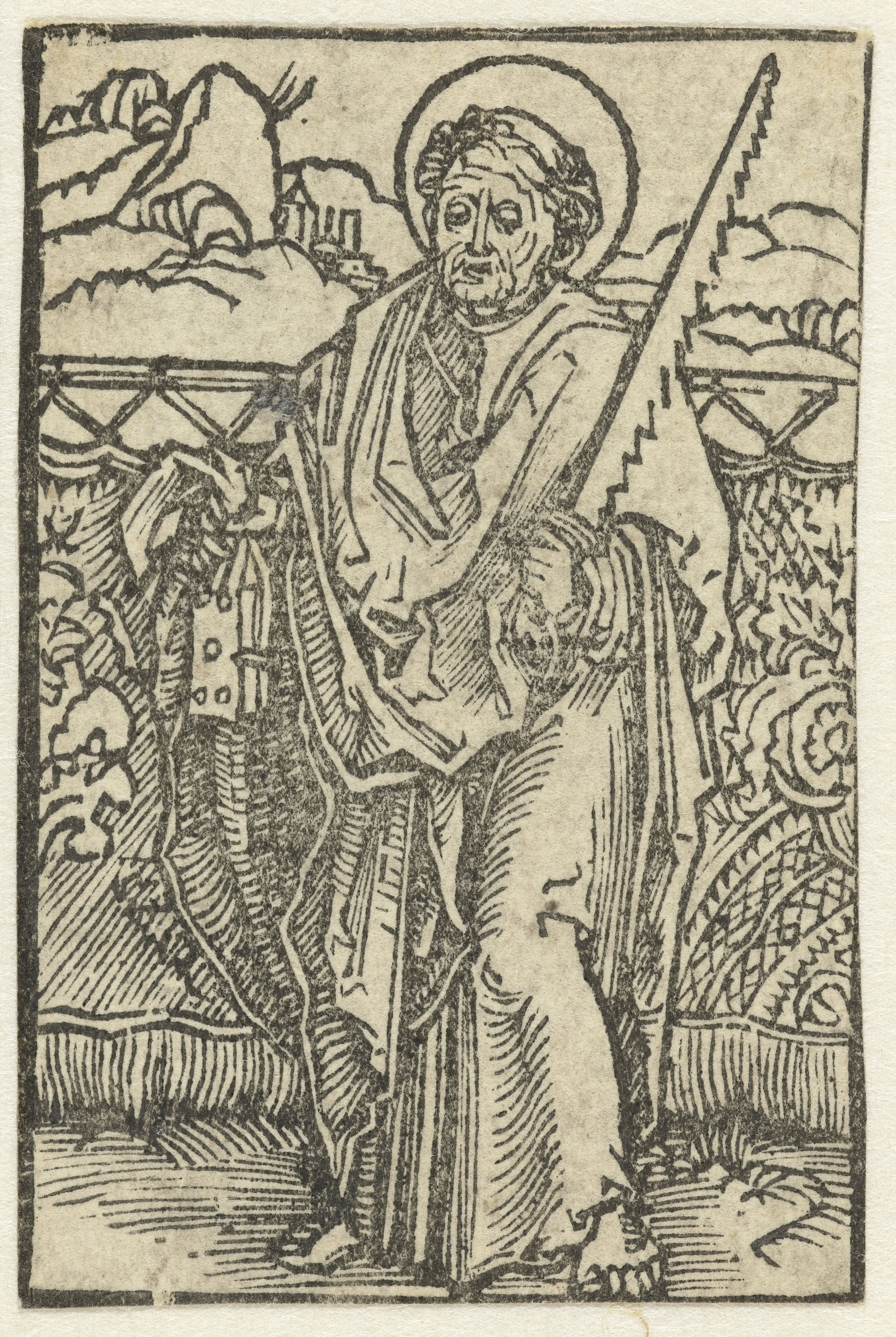
Apostle Simon

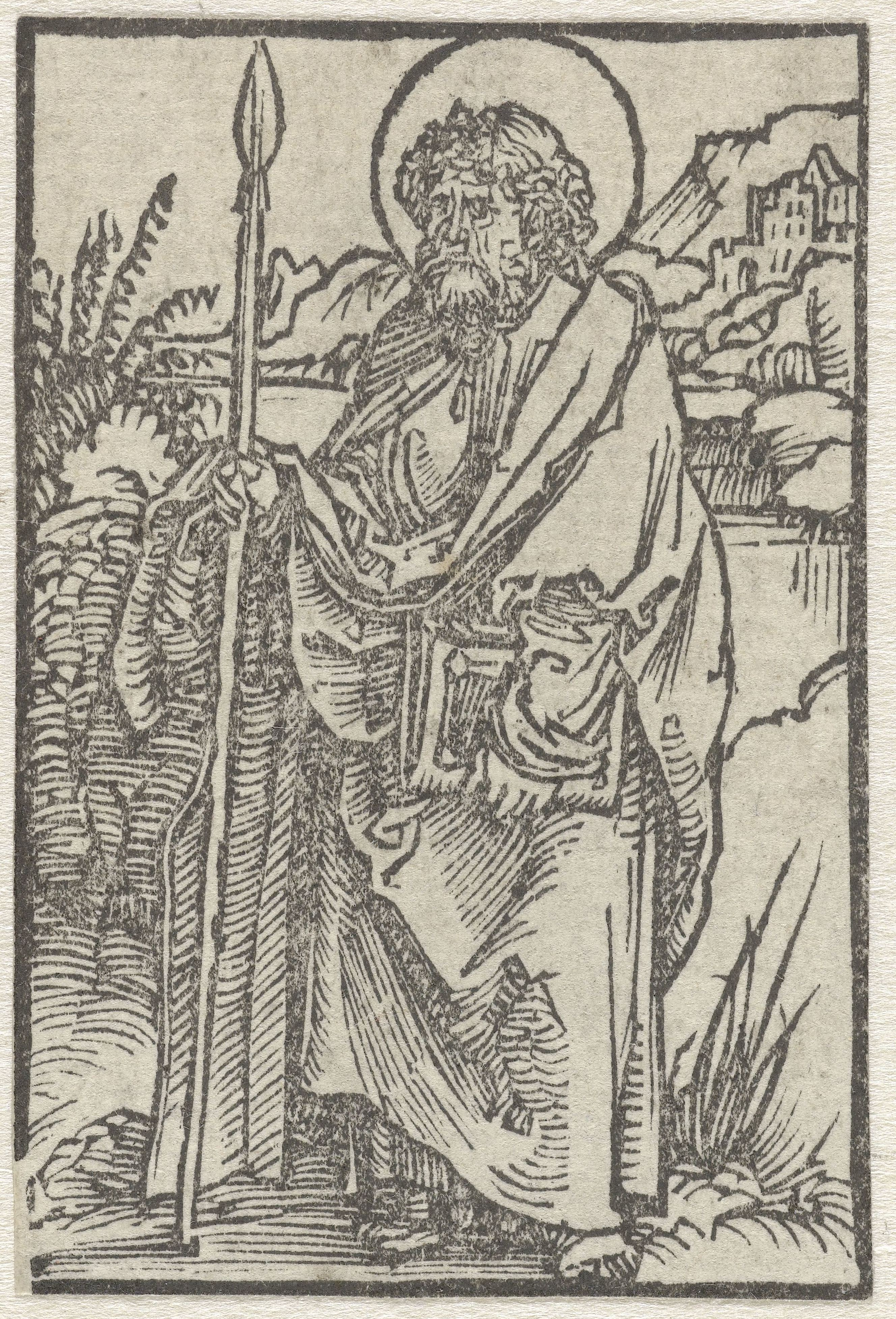
Apostle Thomas

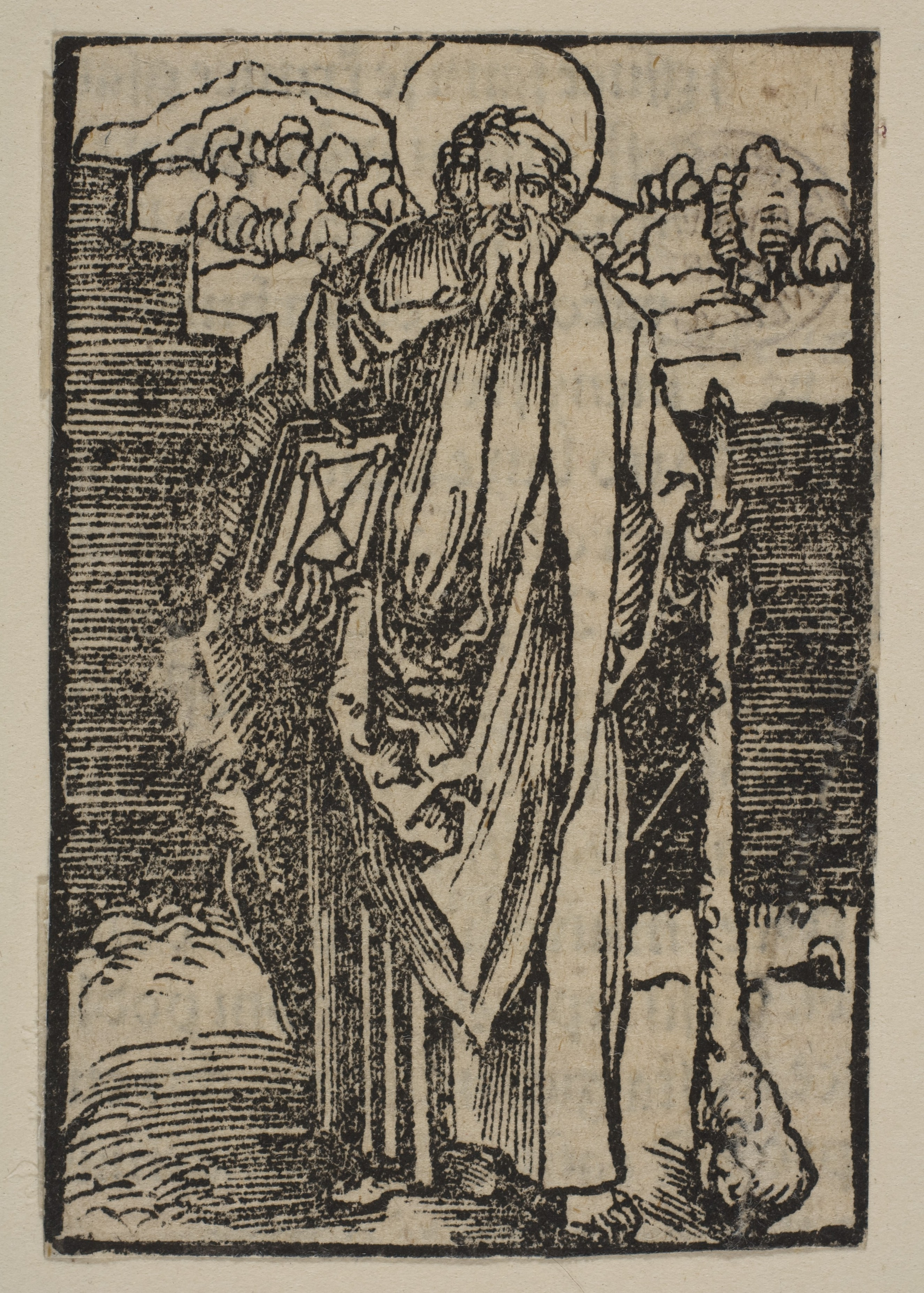
Apostle Judas

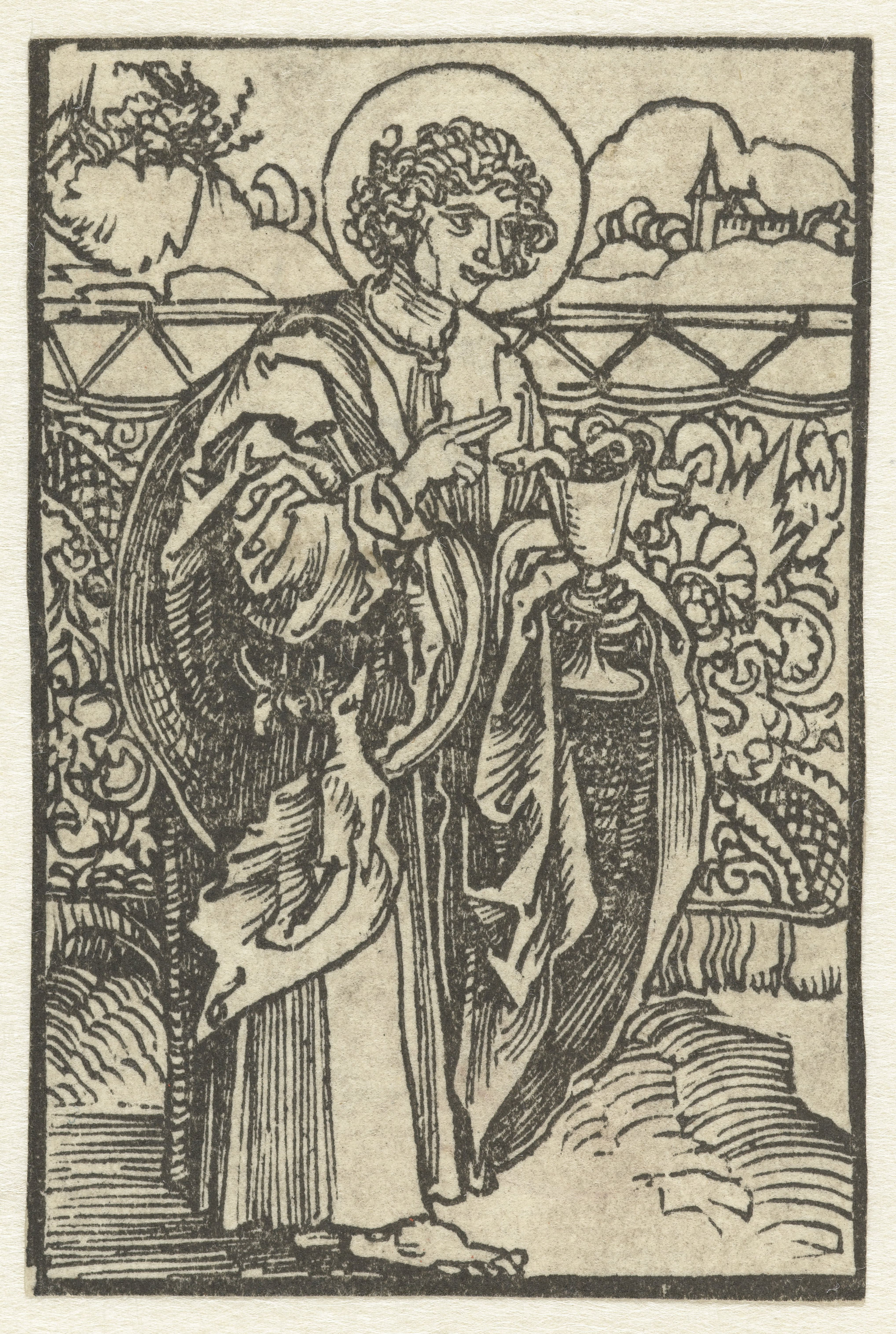
John the Evangelist

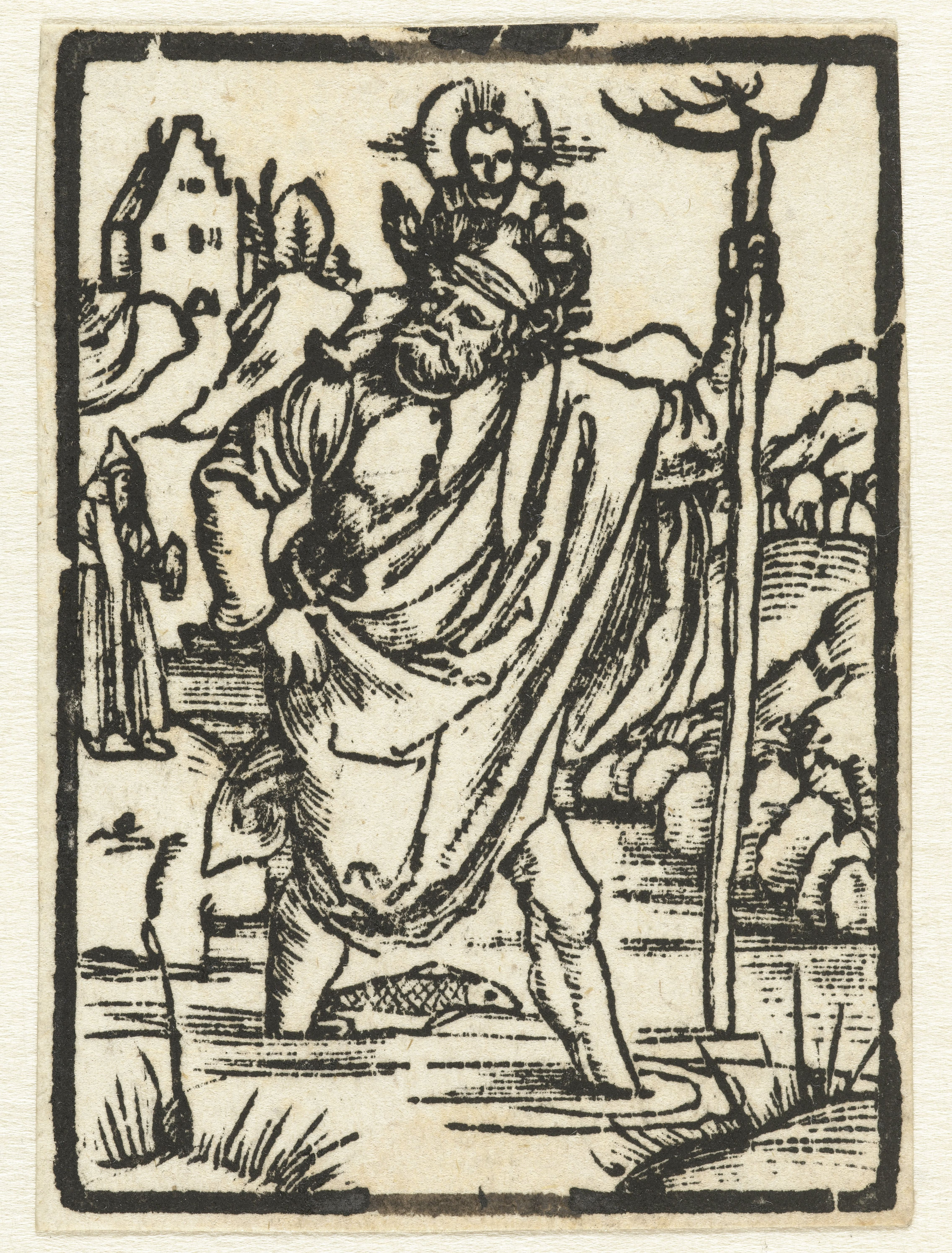
Saint Christopher

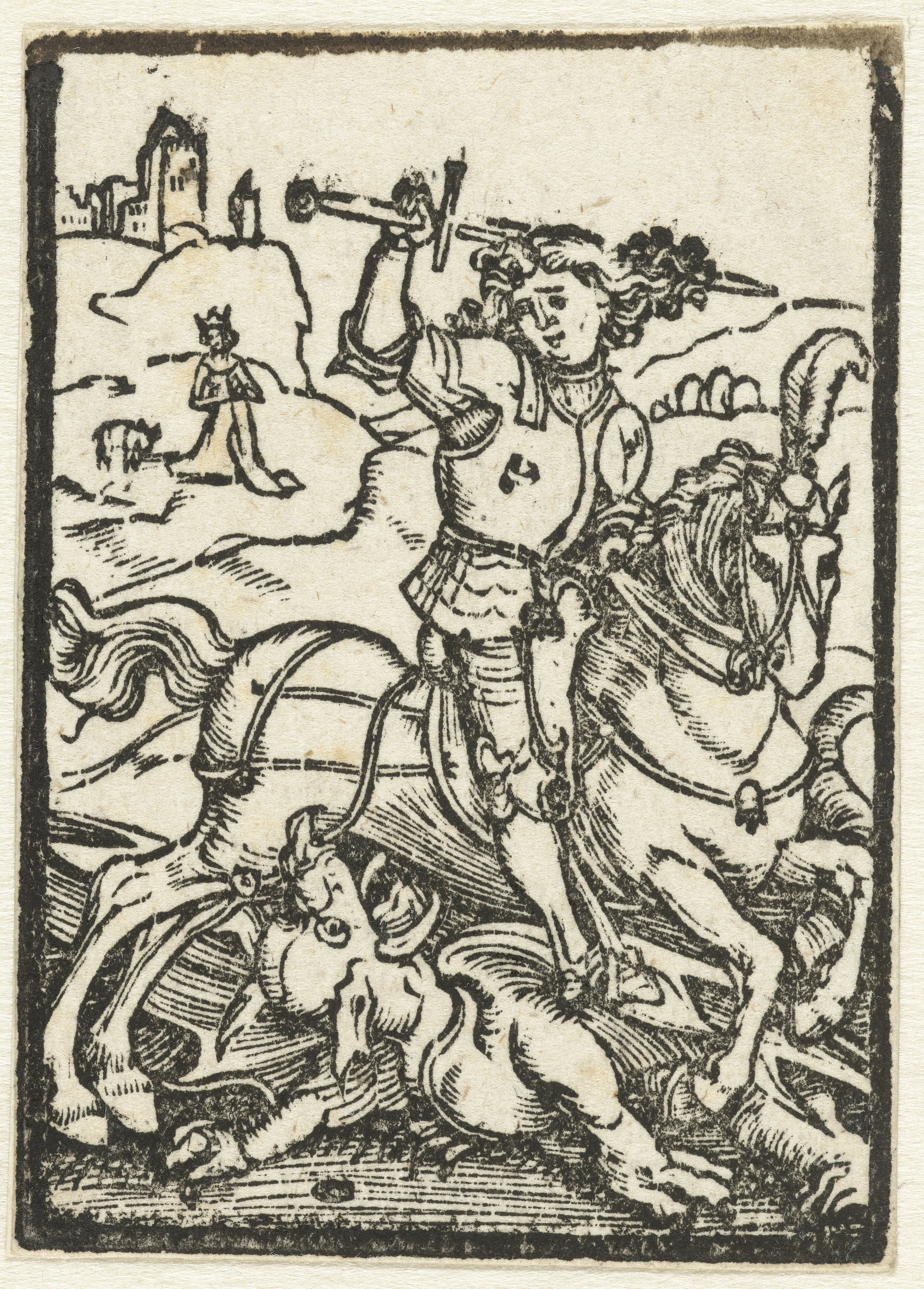
Saint George and the Dragon

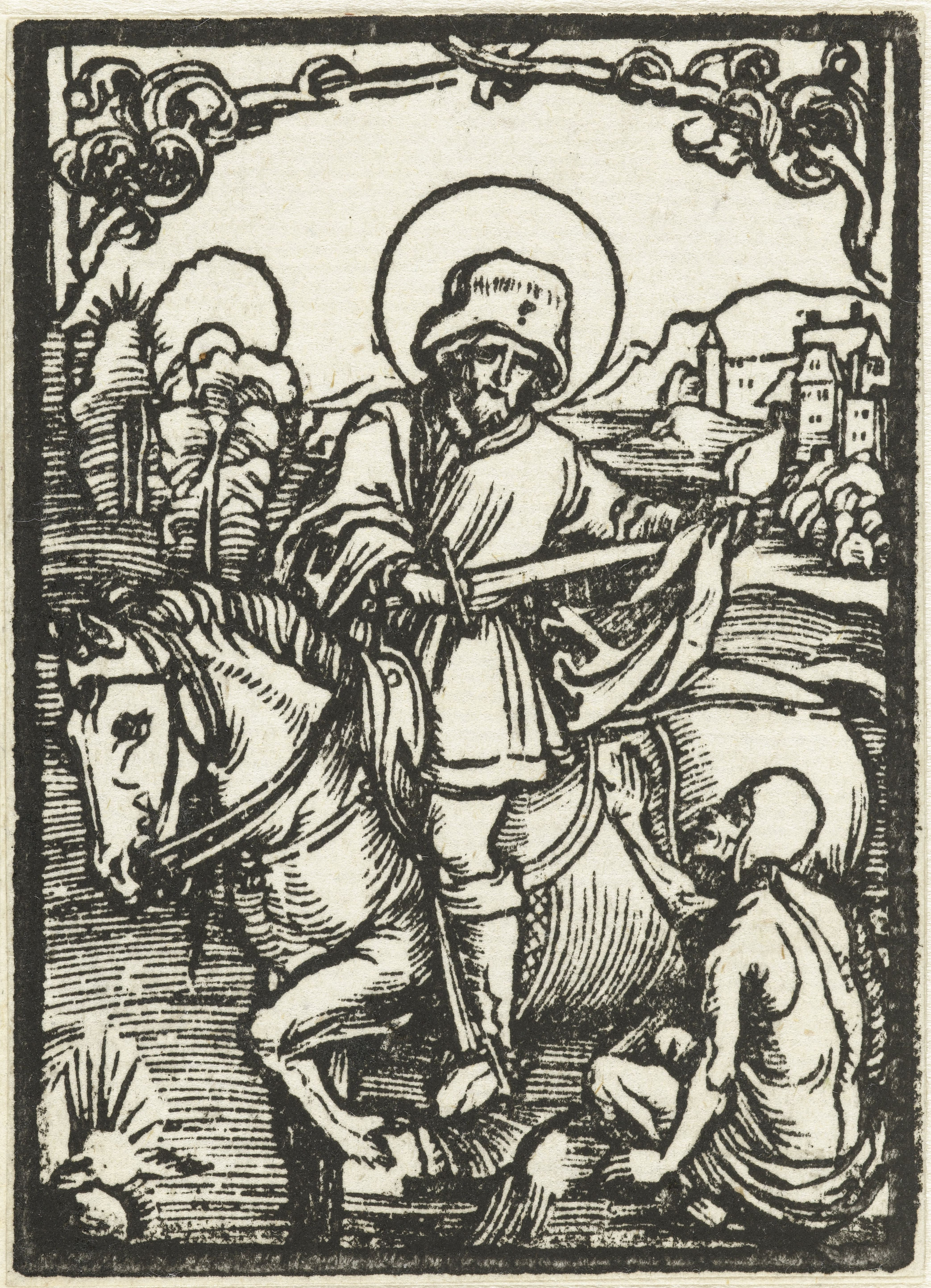
Saint Martin

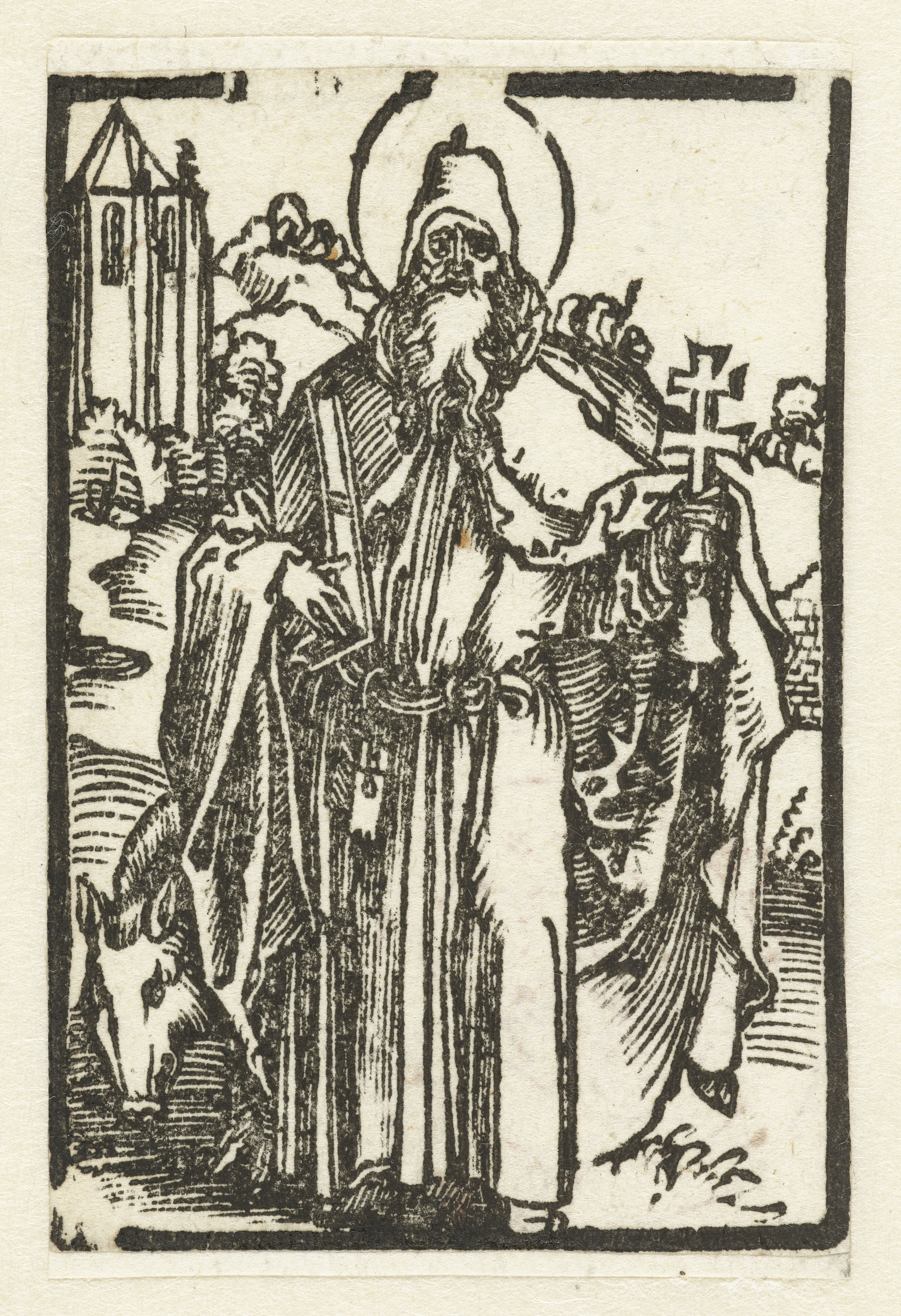
Saint Anthony

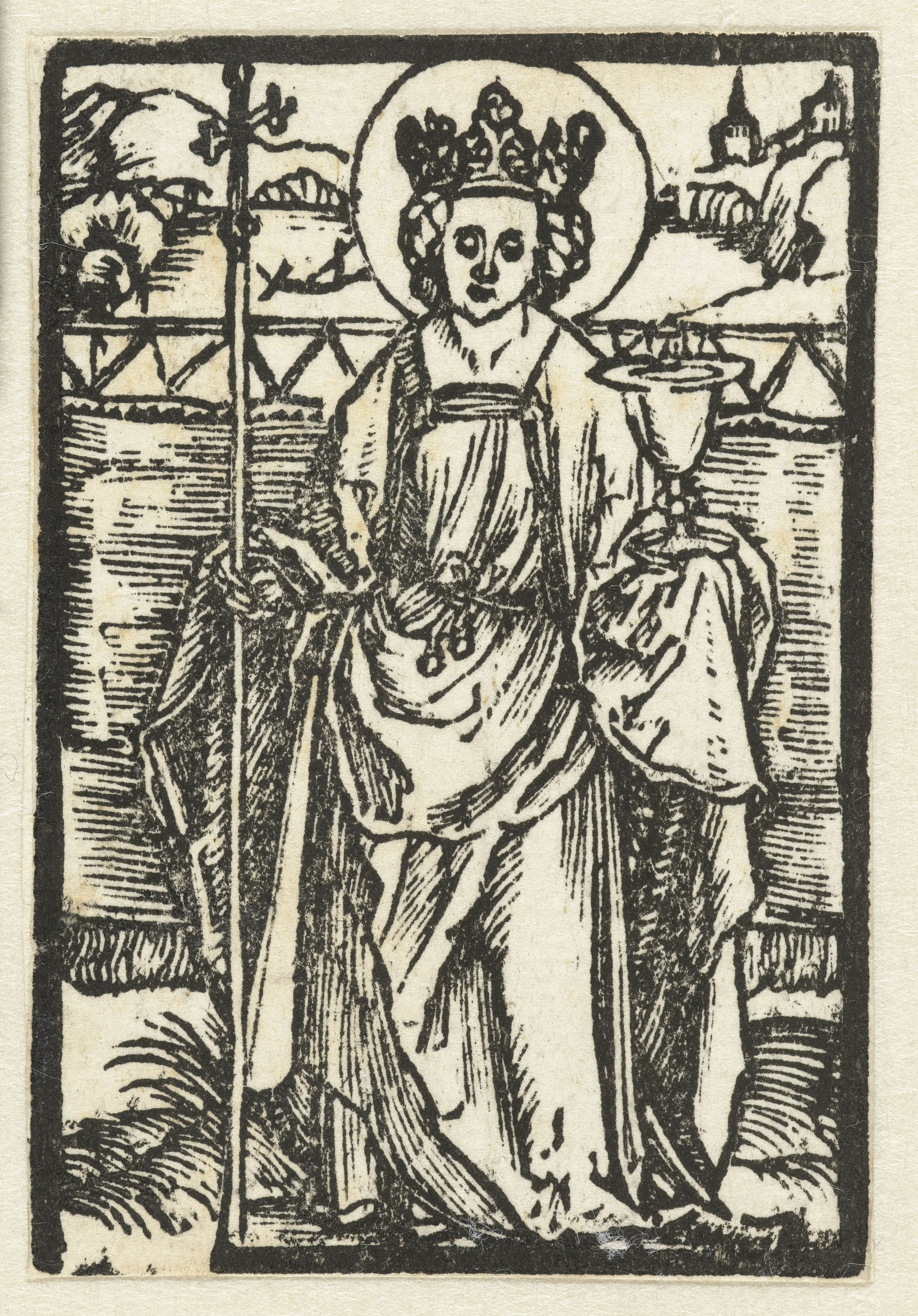
Saint Barbara

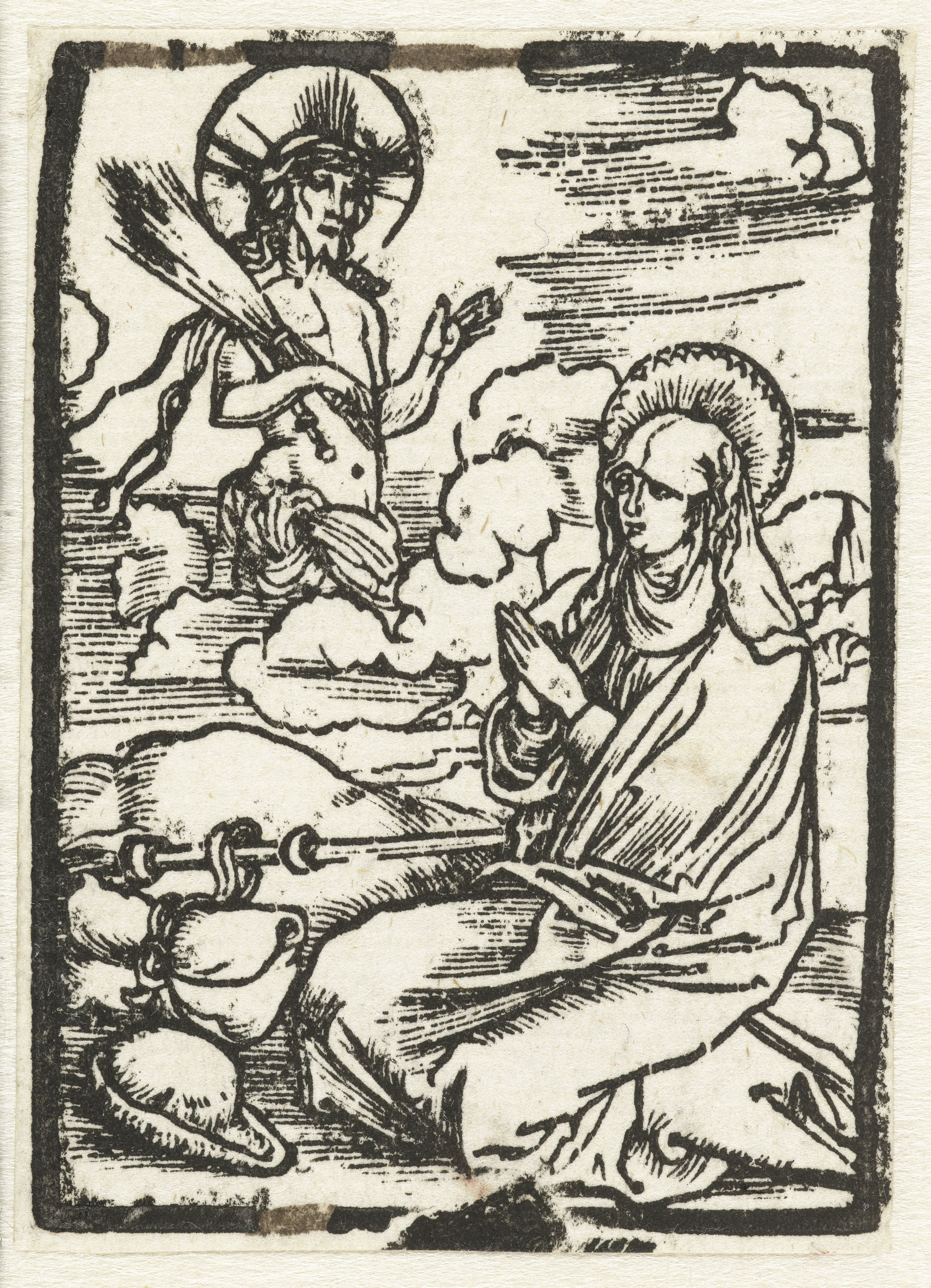
Saint Brigitta

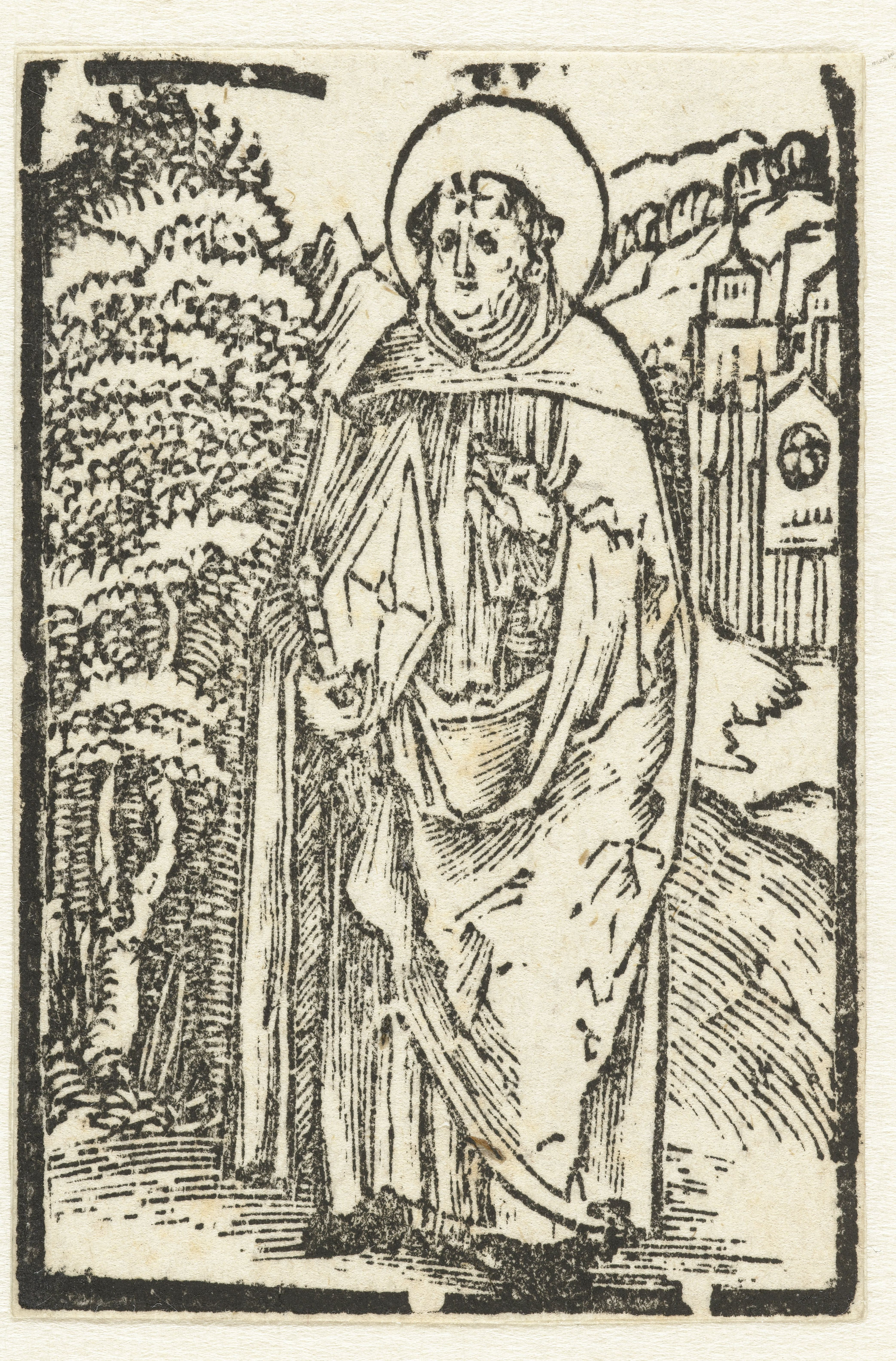
Saint Dominic

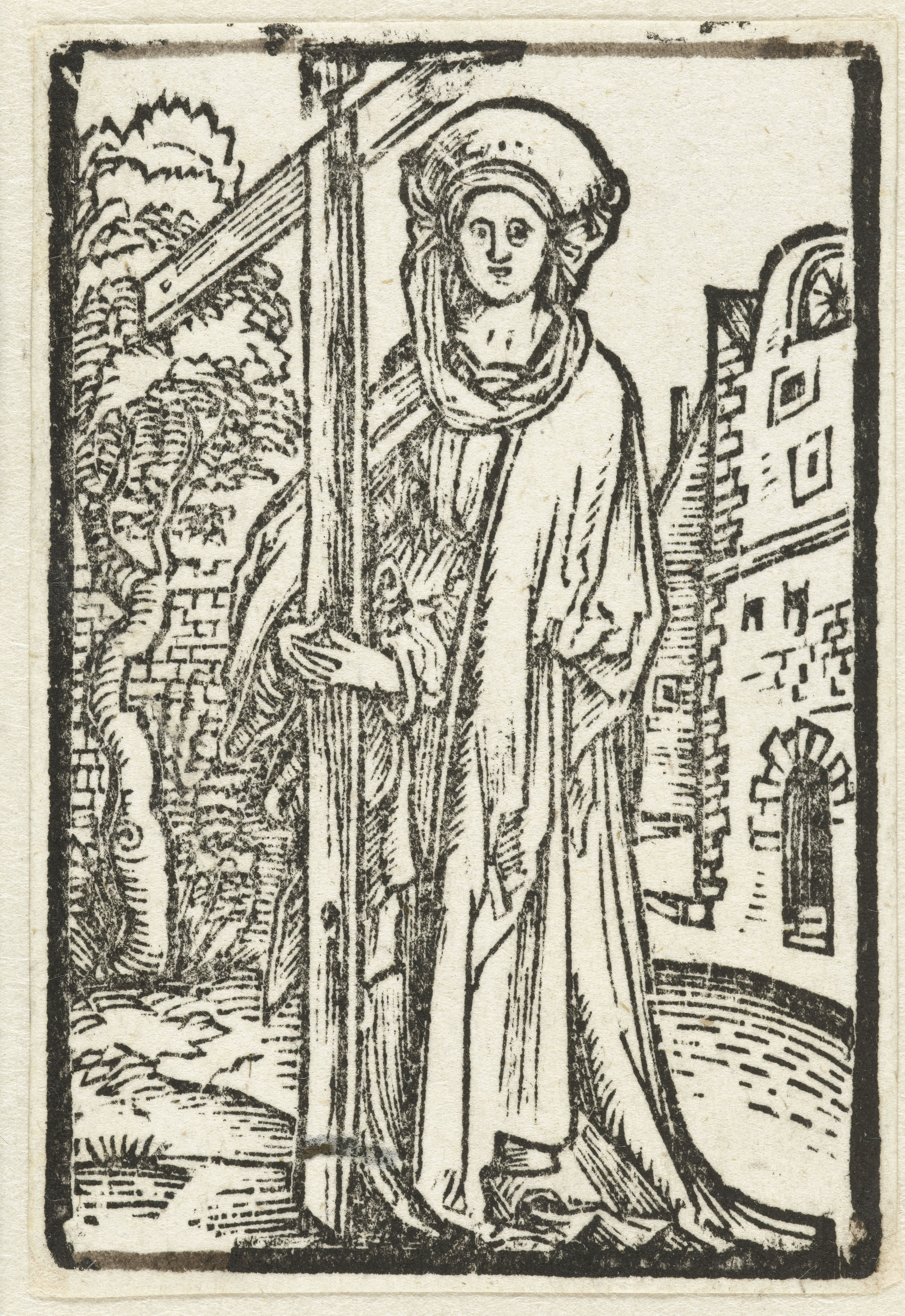
Saint Helena

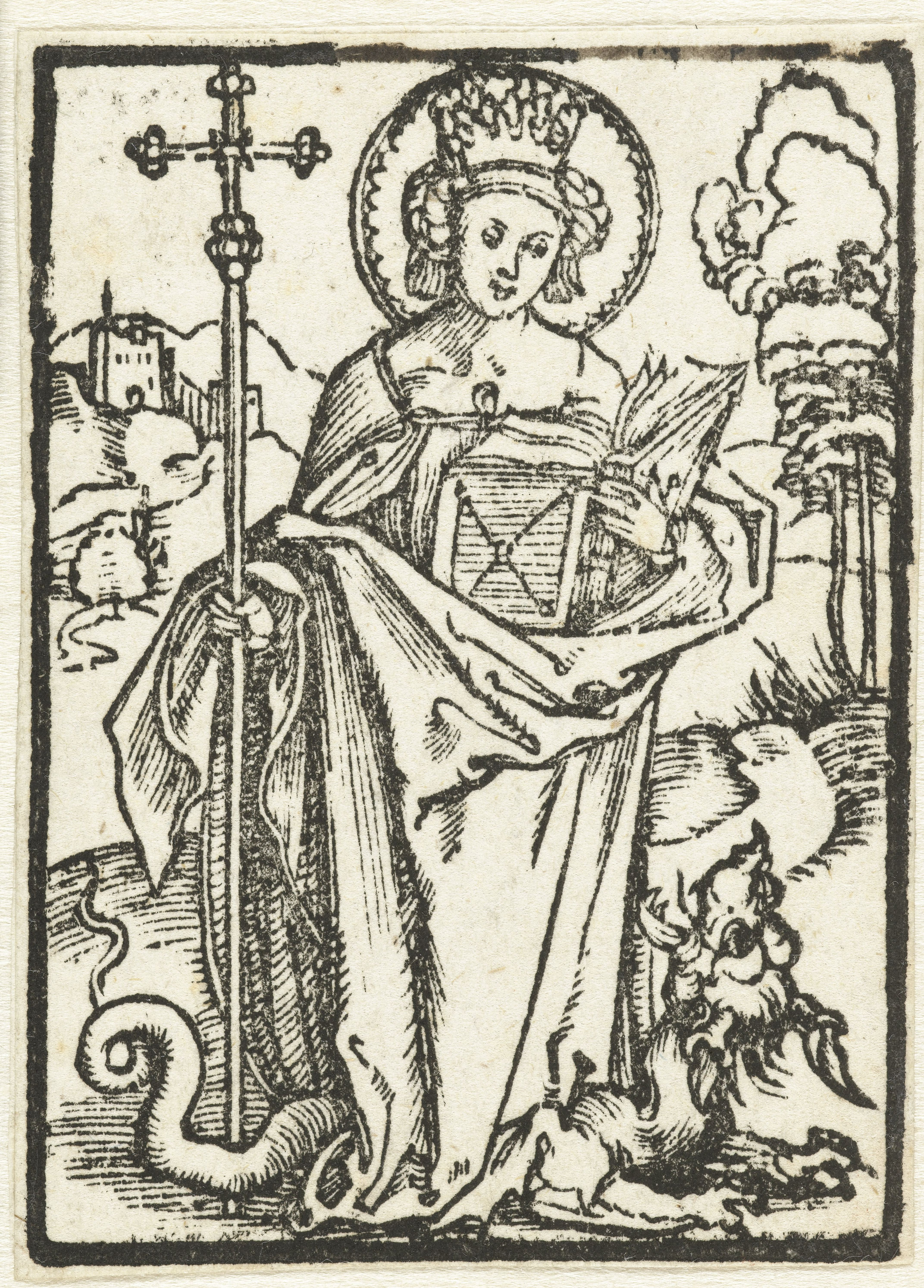
Saint Margaret

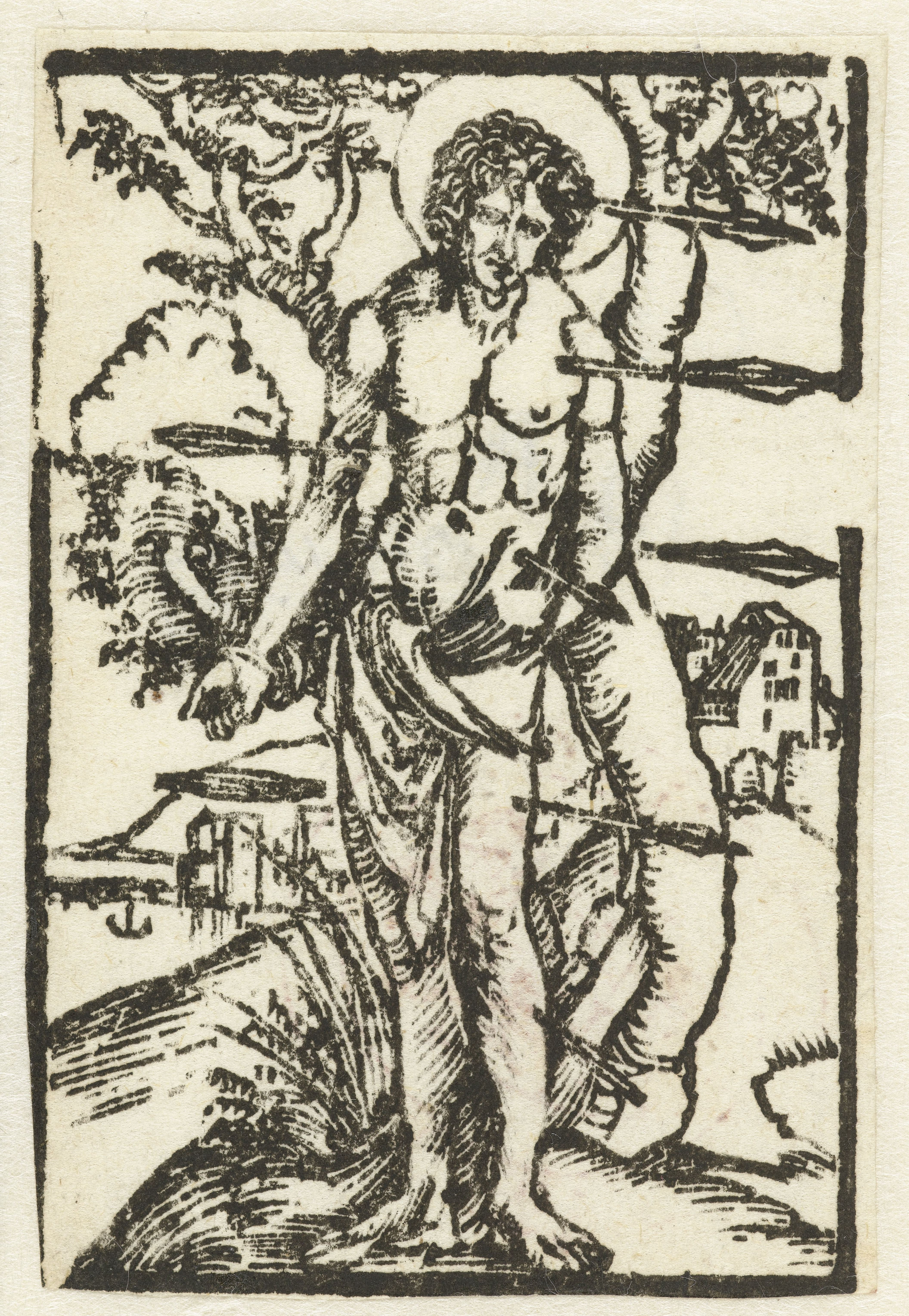
Saint Sebastian

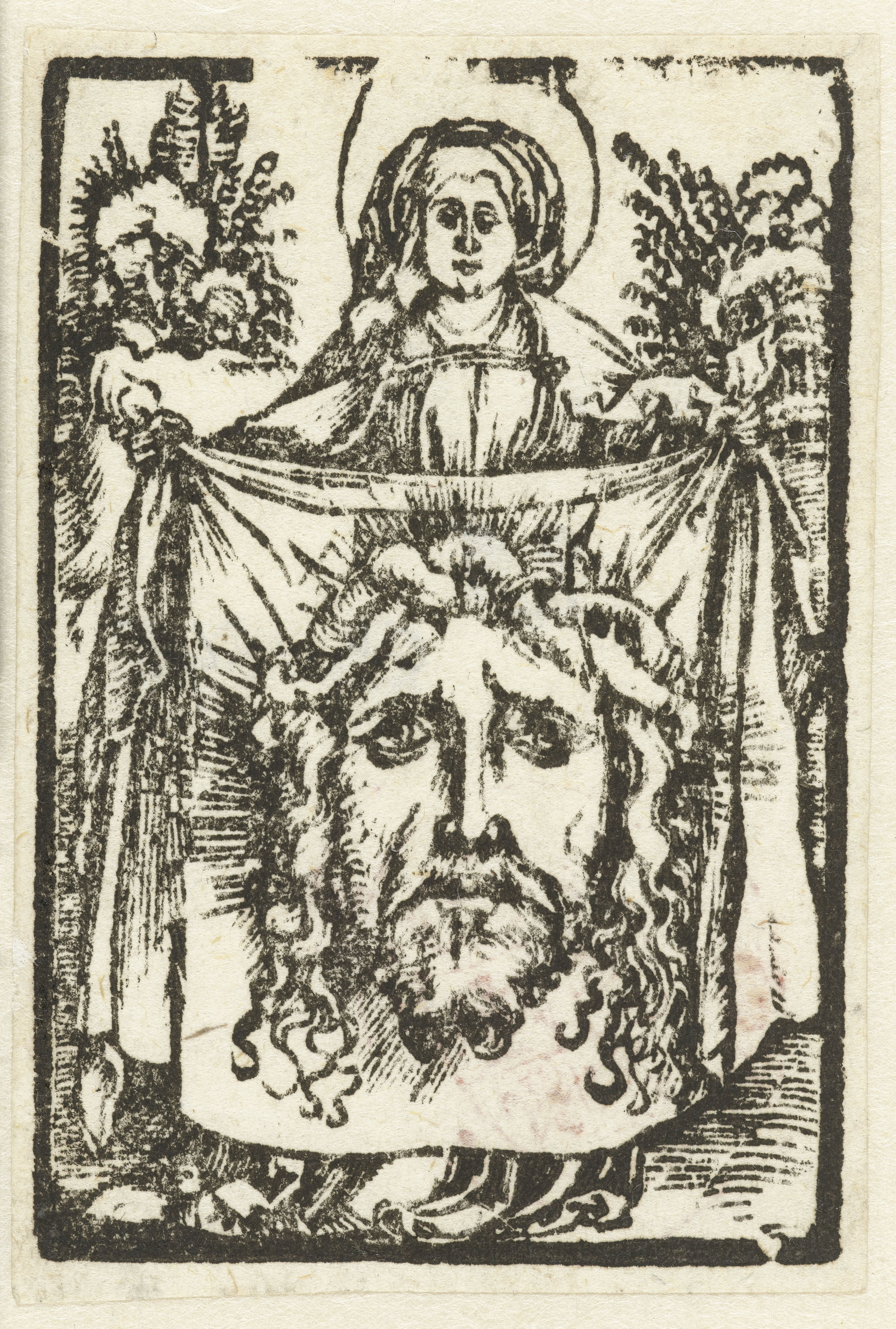
Saint Veronica

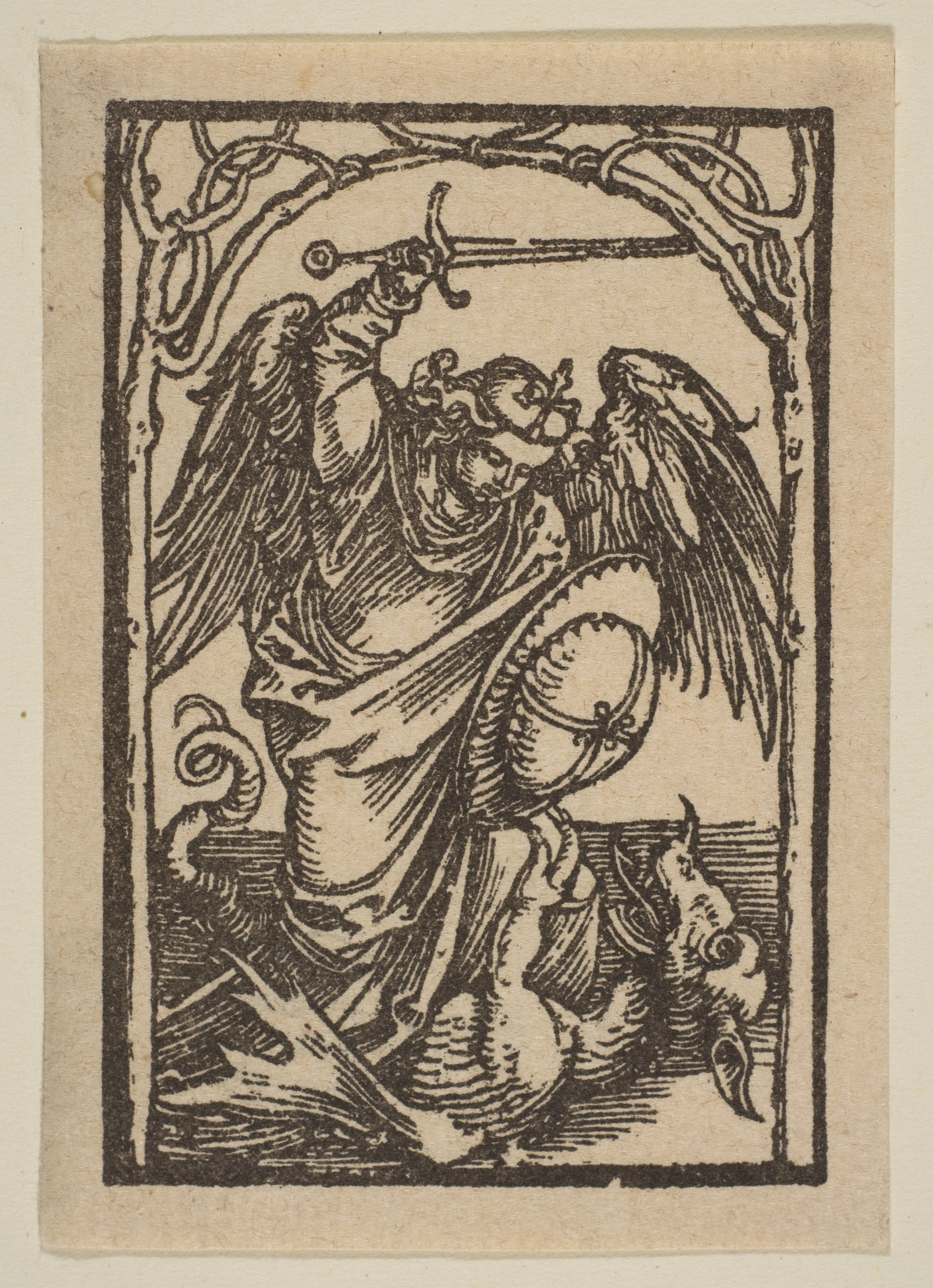
Saint Michael

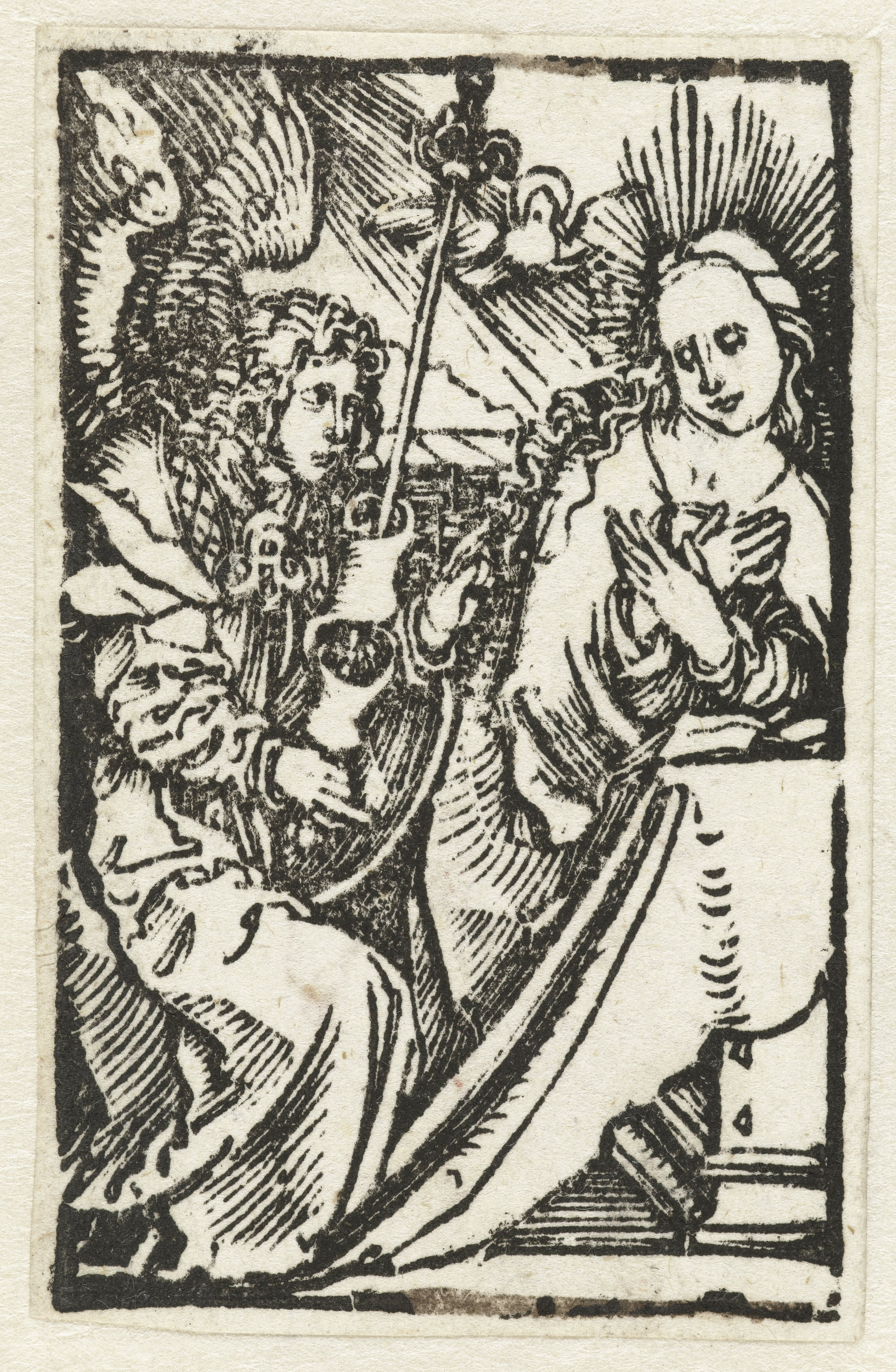
Annunciation

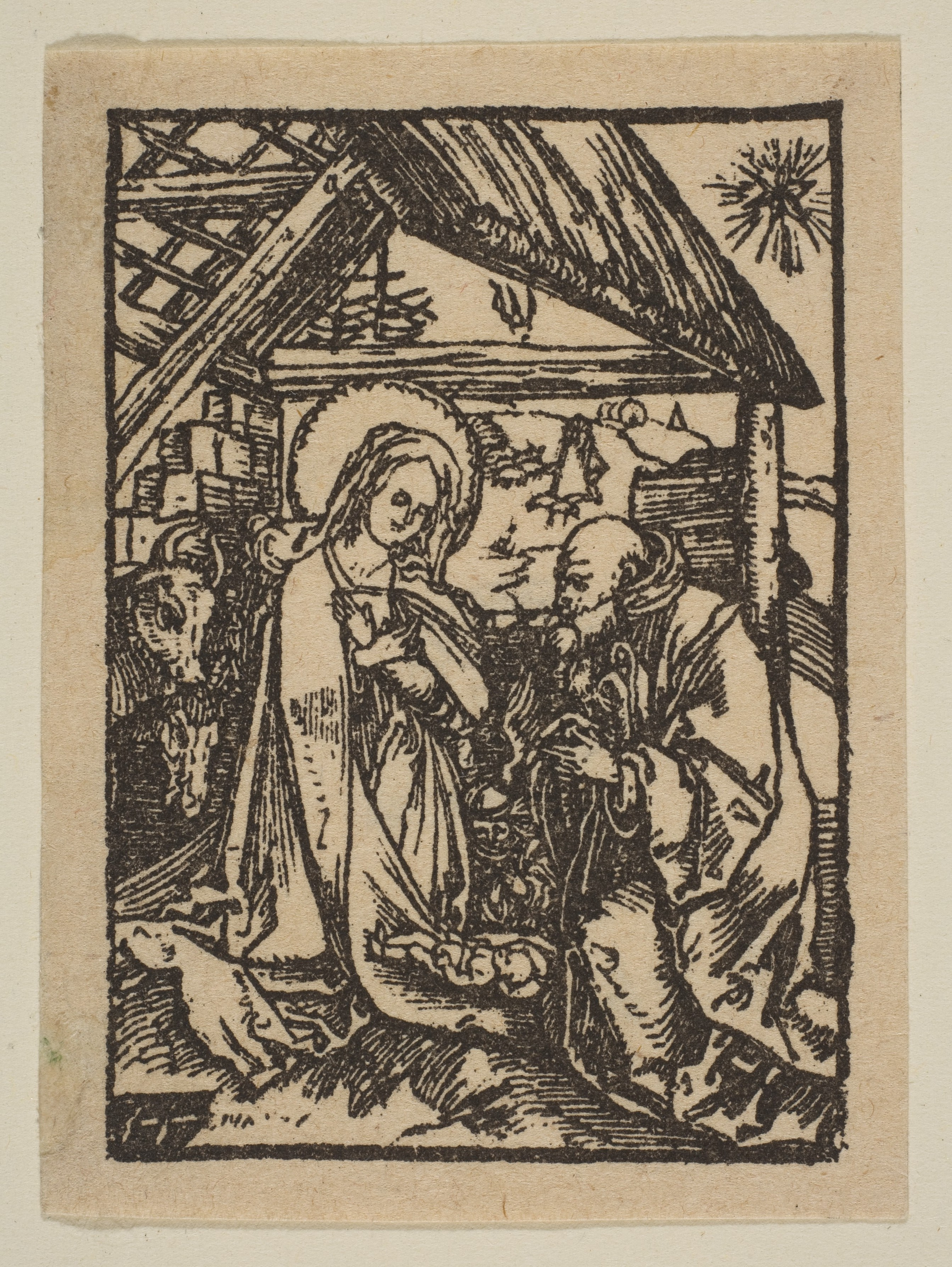
Nativity

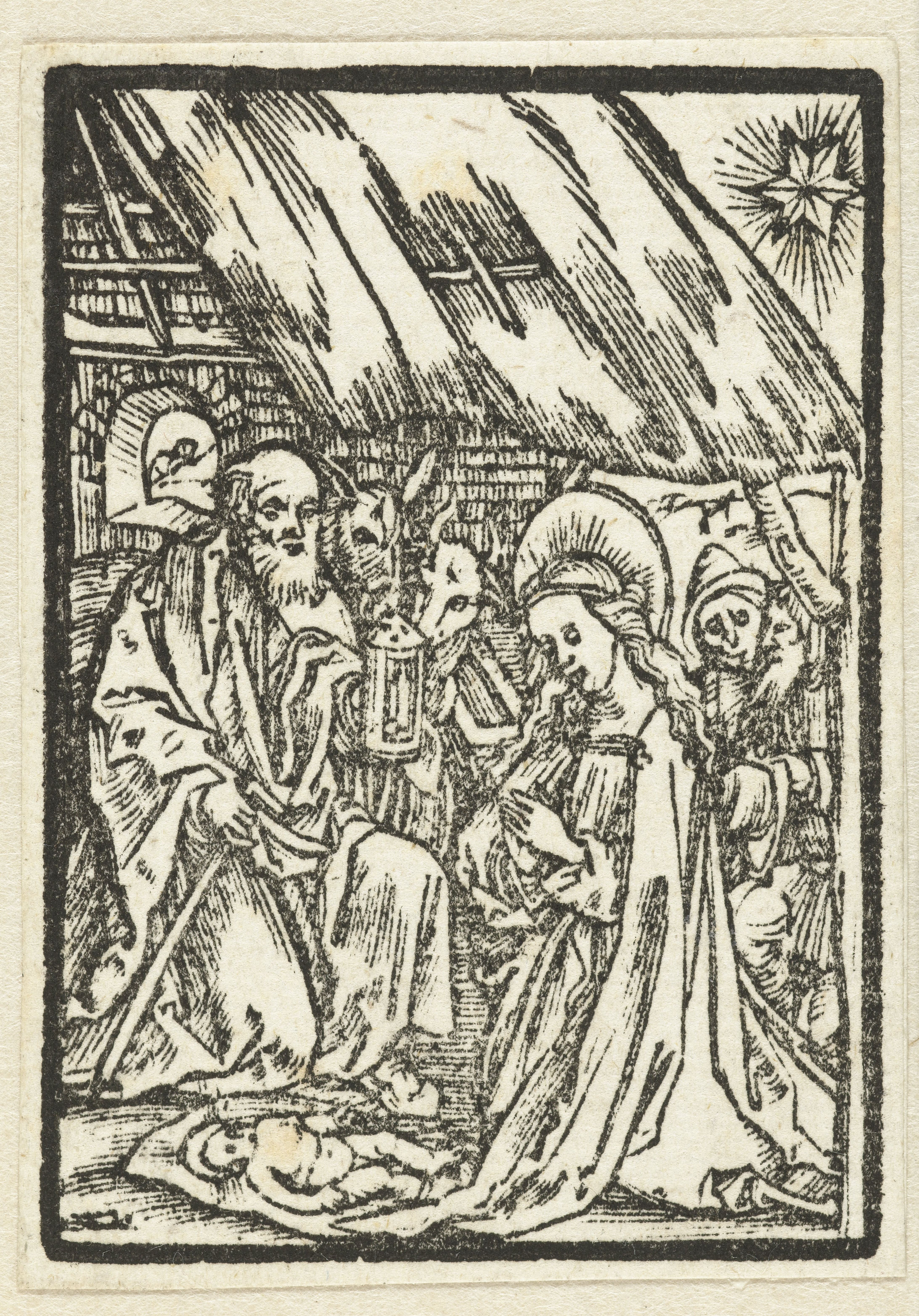
Adoration of the Shepherds

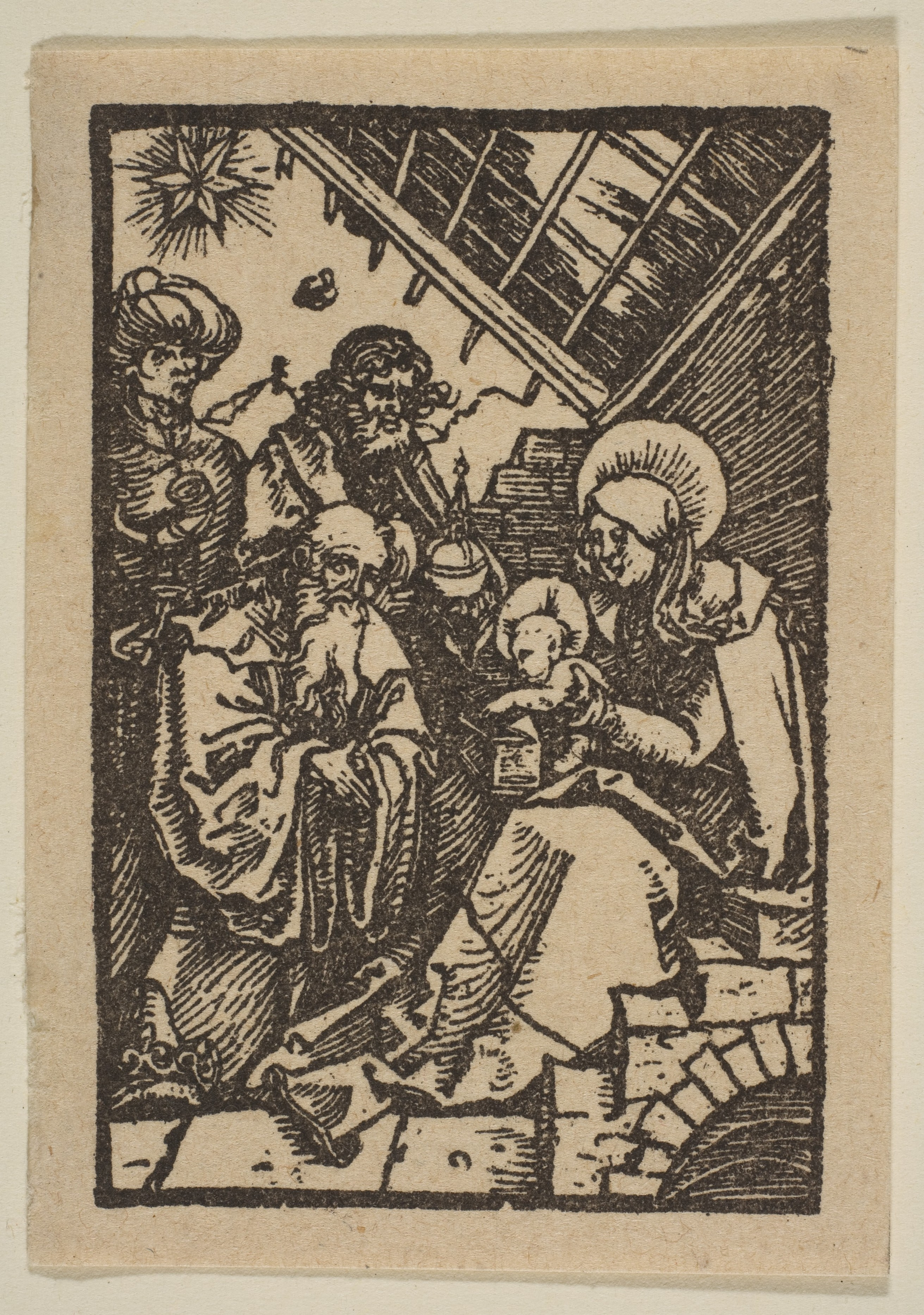
Adoration of the kings

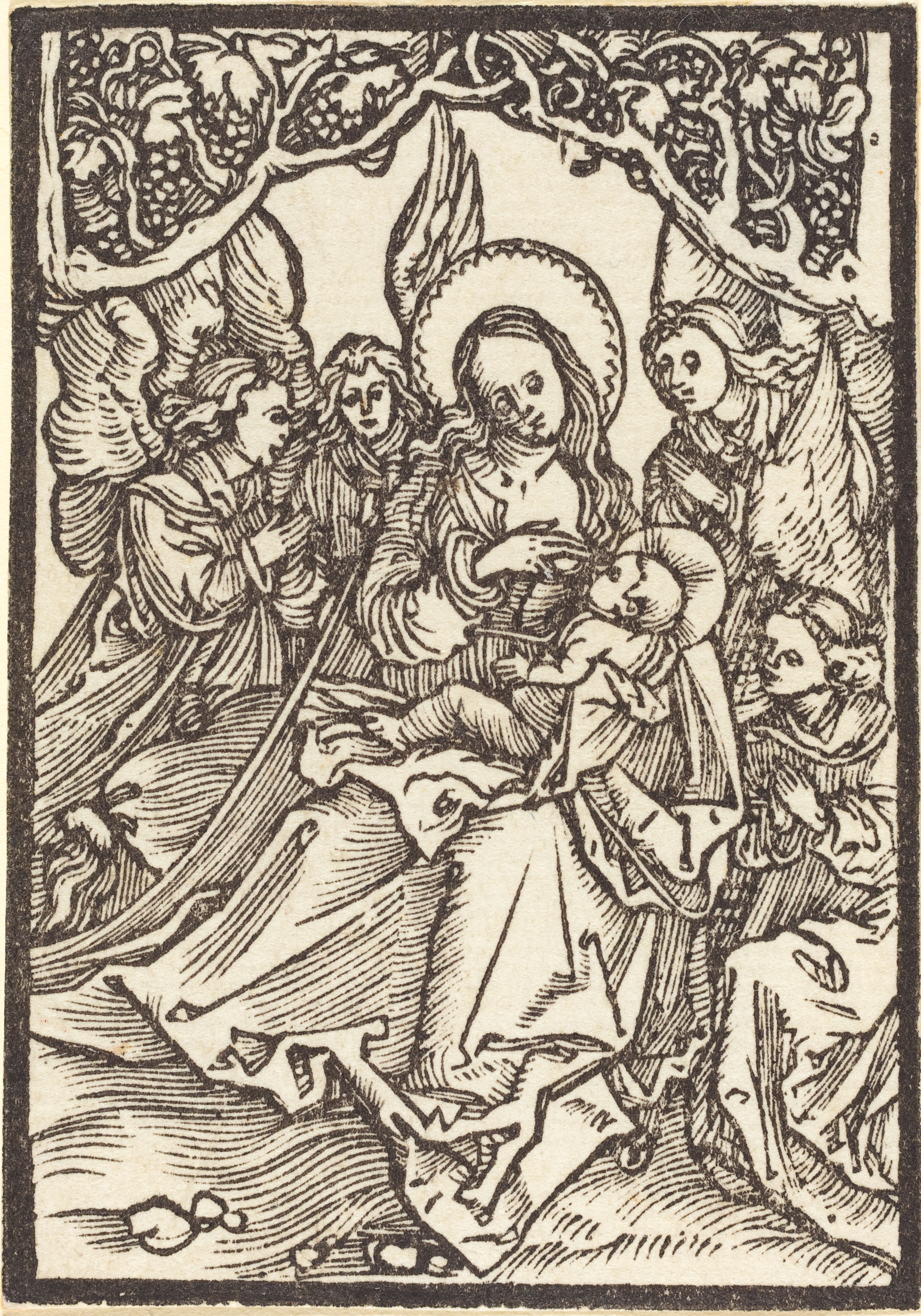
The Virgin Nursing the Christ Child with Four Angels

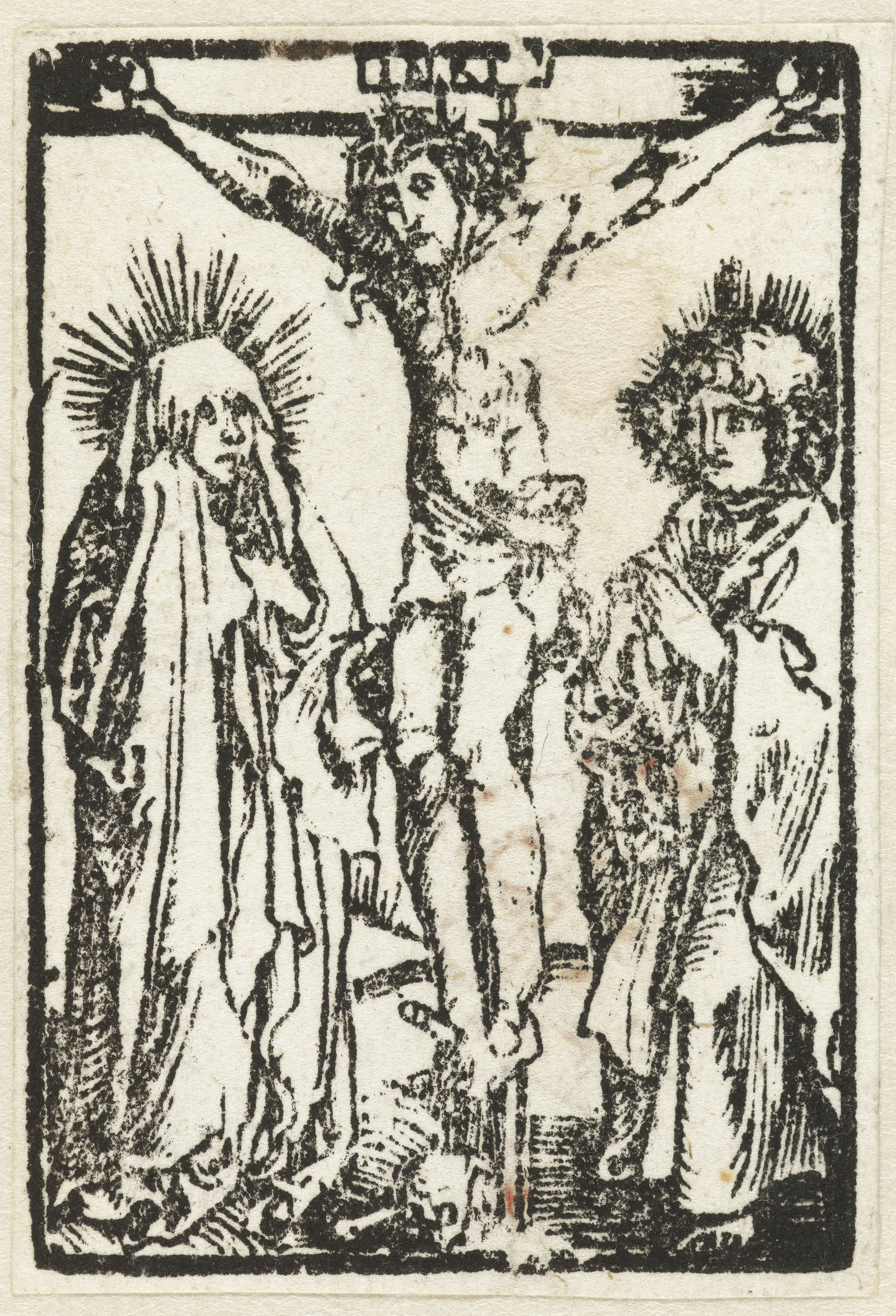
Crucifixion

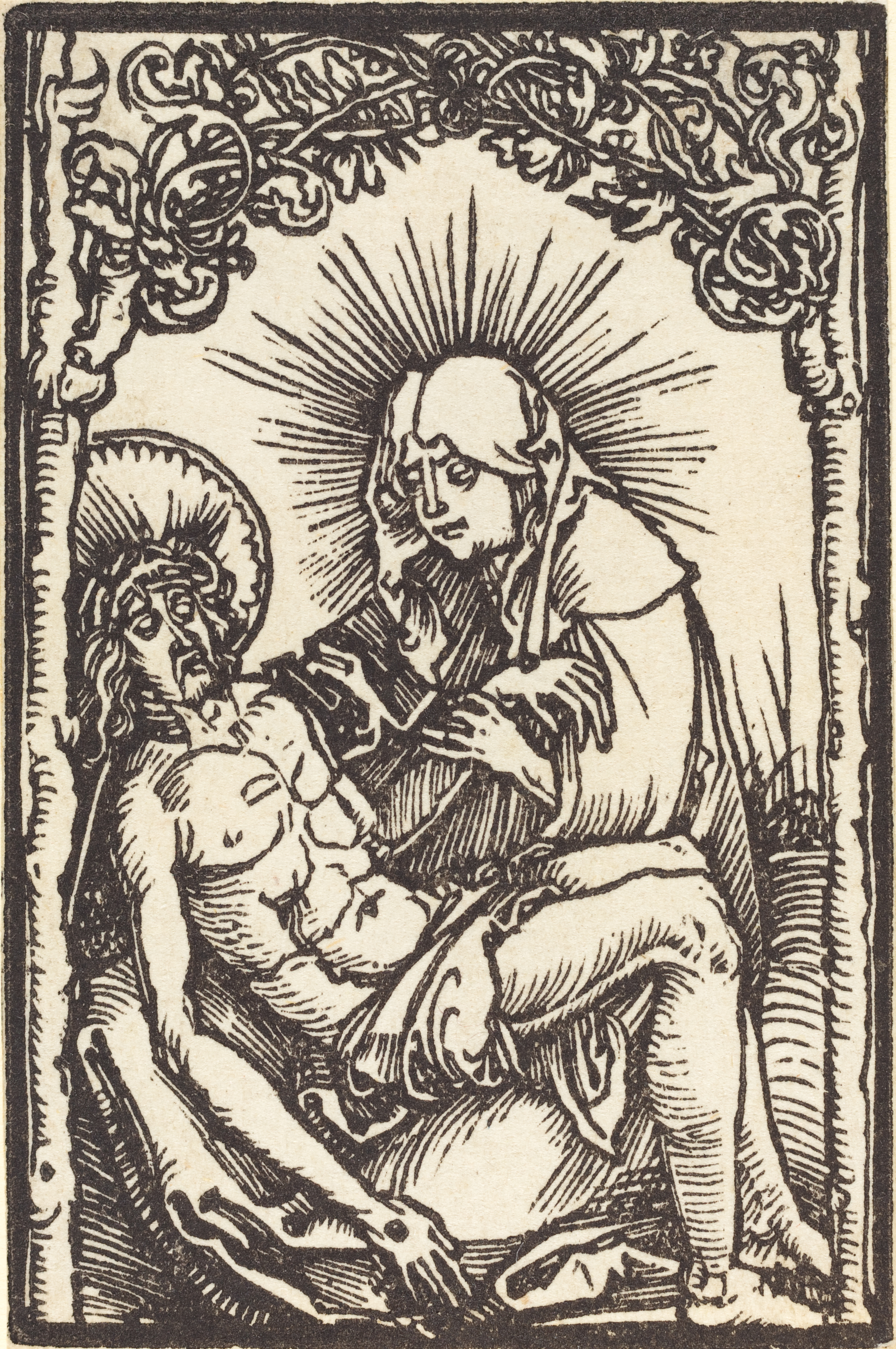
The Lamentation

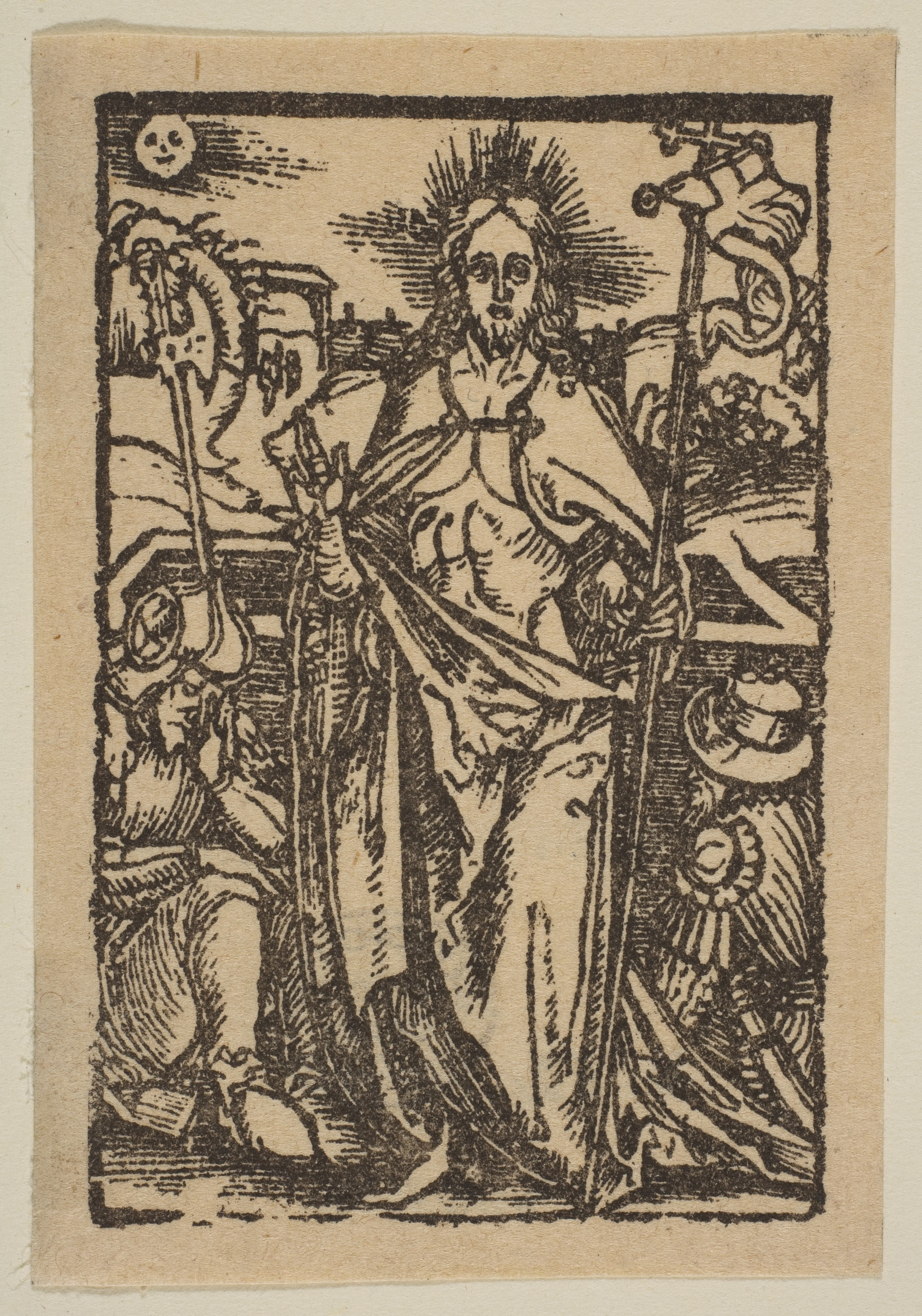
Resurrection

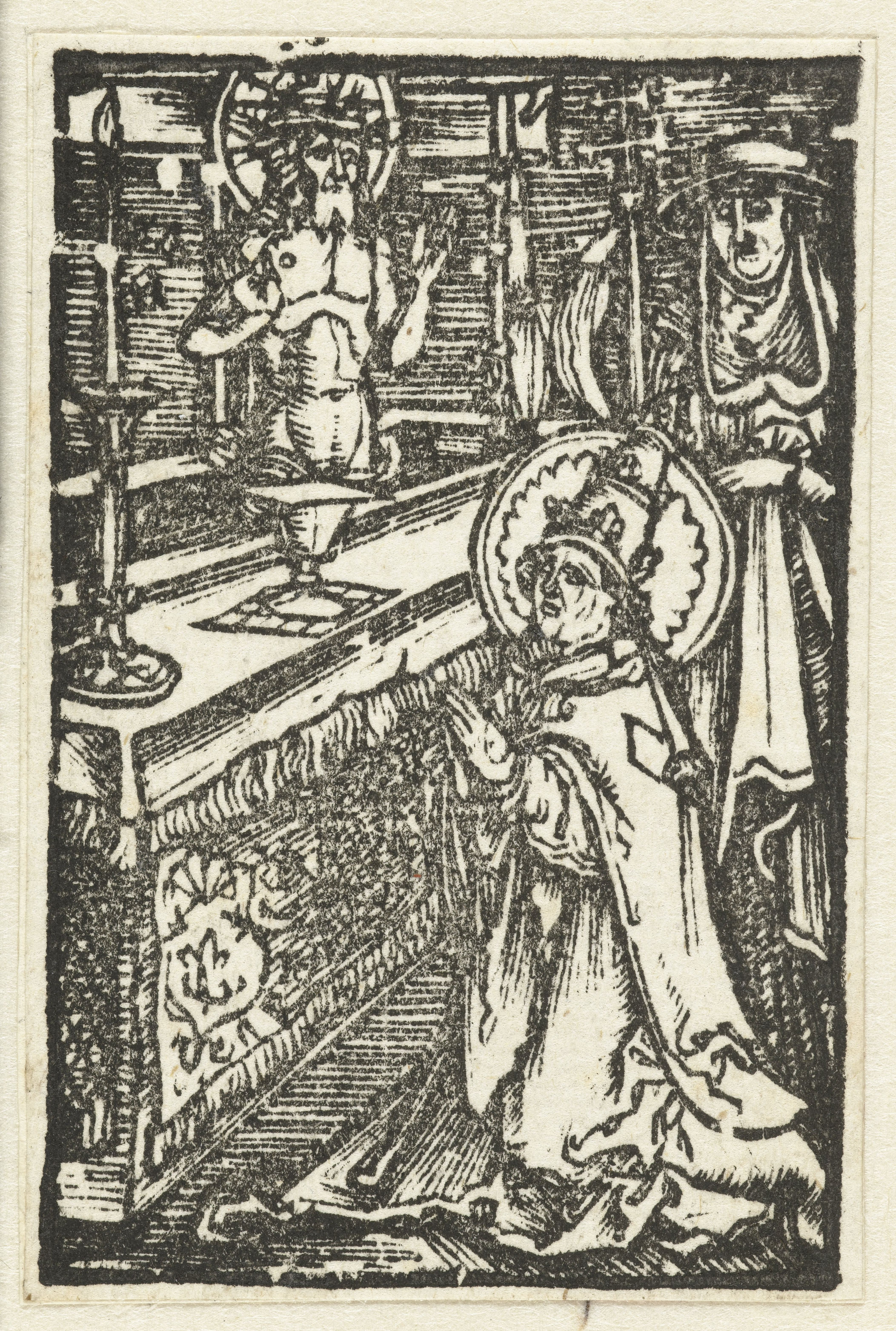
Mass of Saint Gregory

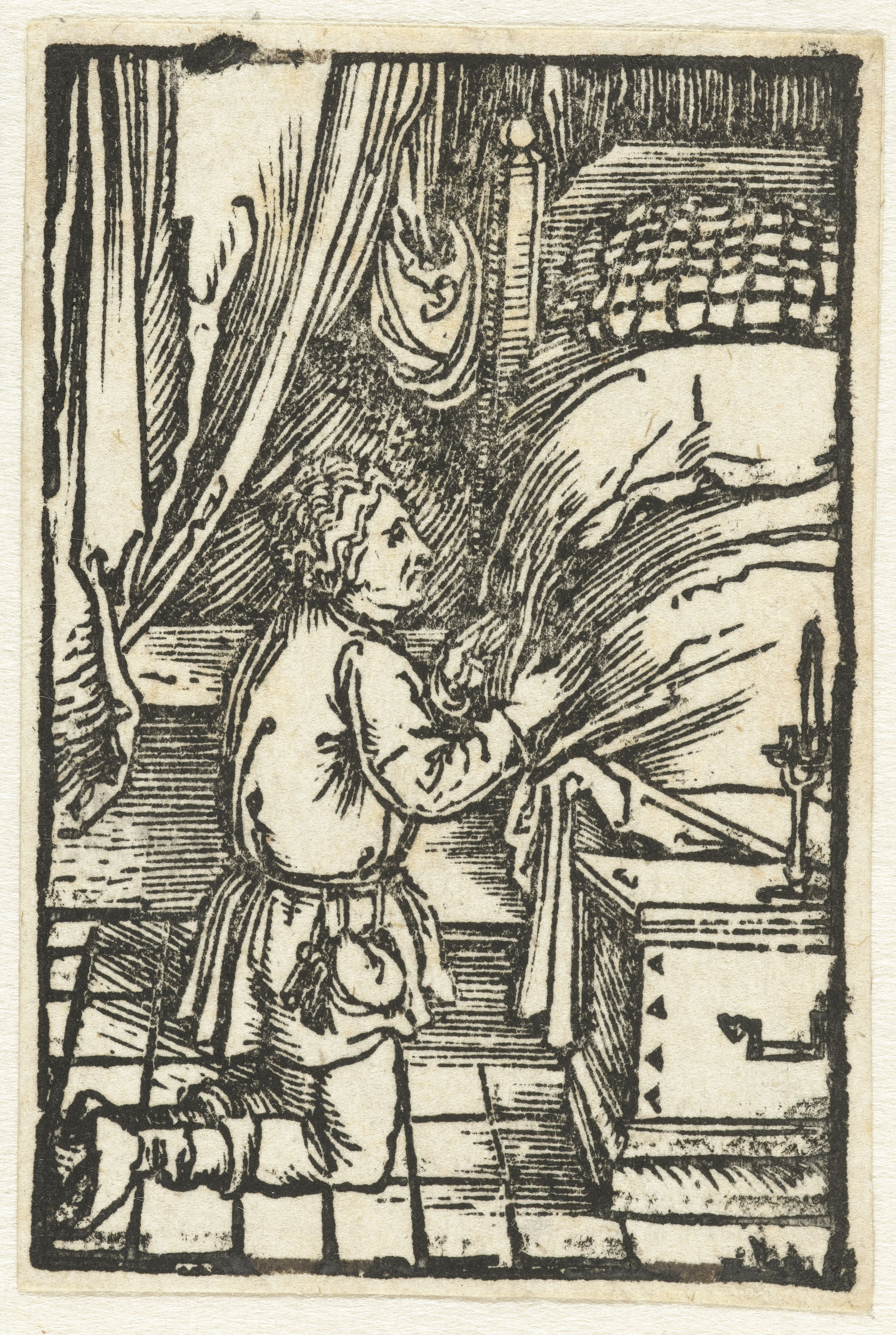
Evening Prayer

=== Four Books on Human Proportion (1528) ===
Among his many manuscripts Durer, along with his wife Agnes and friend Willibald Pirckheimer (posthumously) published "Four Books on Human Proportion". Many of Durer's handmade drawings were drawn on a grid to help him simplify the proportions of people in motion.

Illustrations from the book Four Books on Human Proportion (German: Vier Bücher von Menschlicher Proportion).

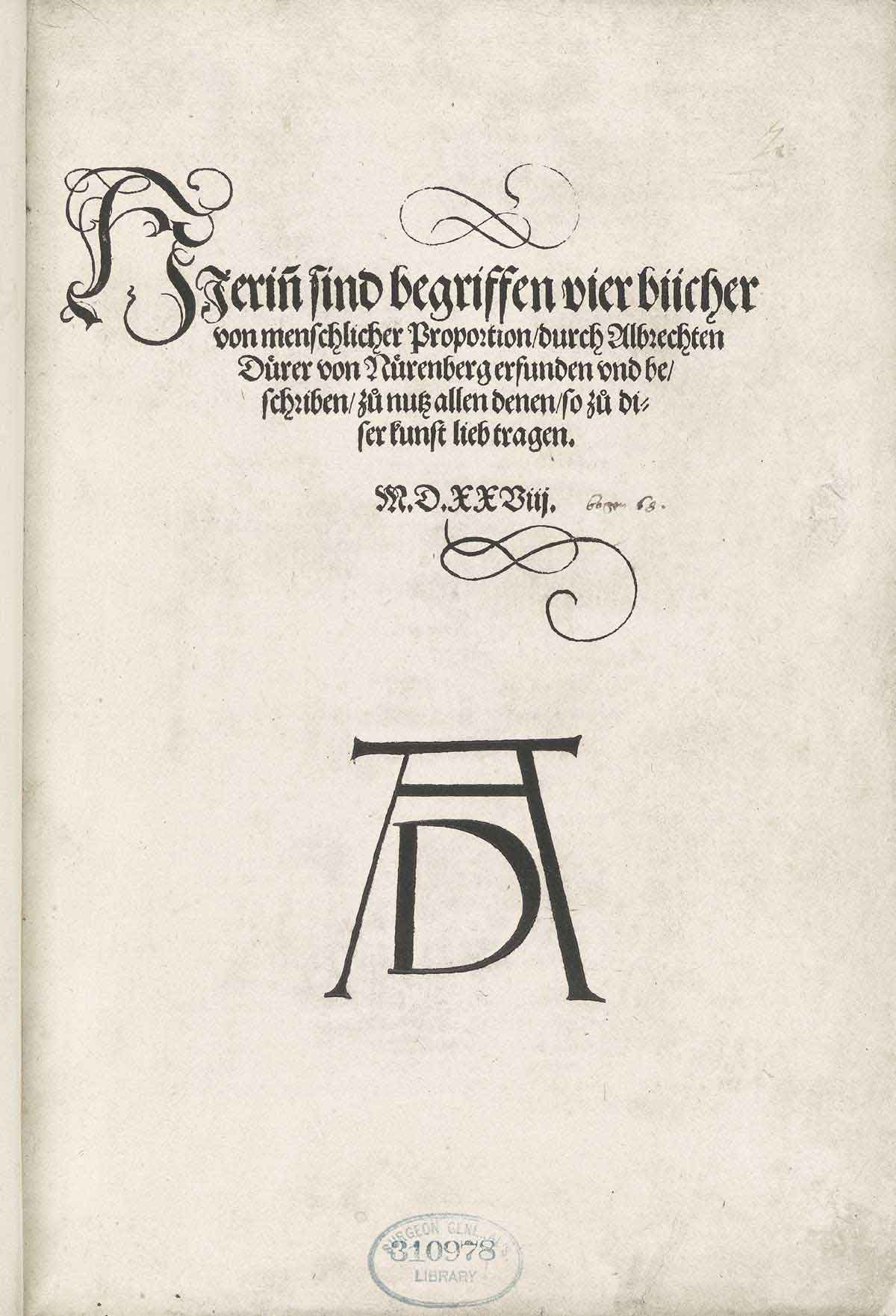

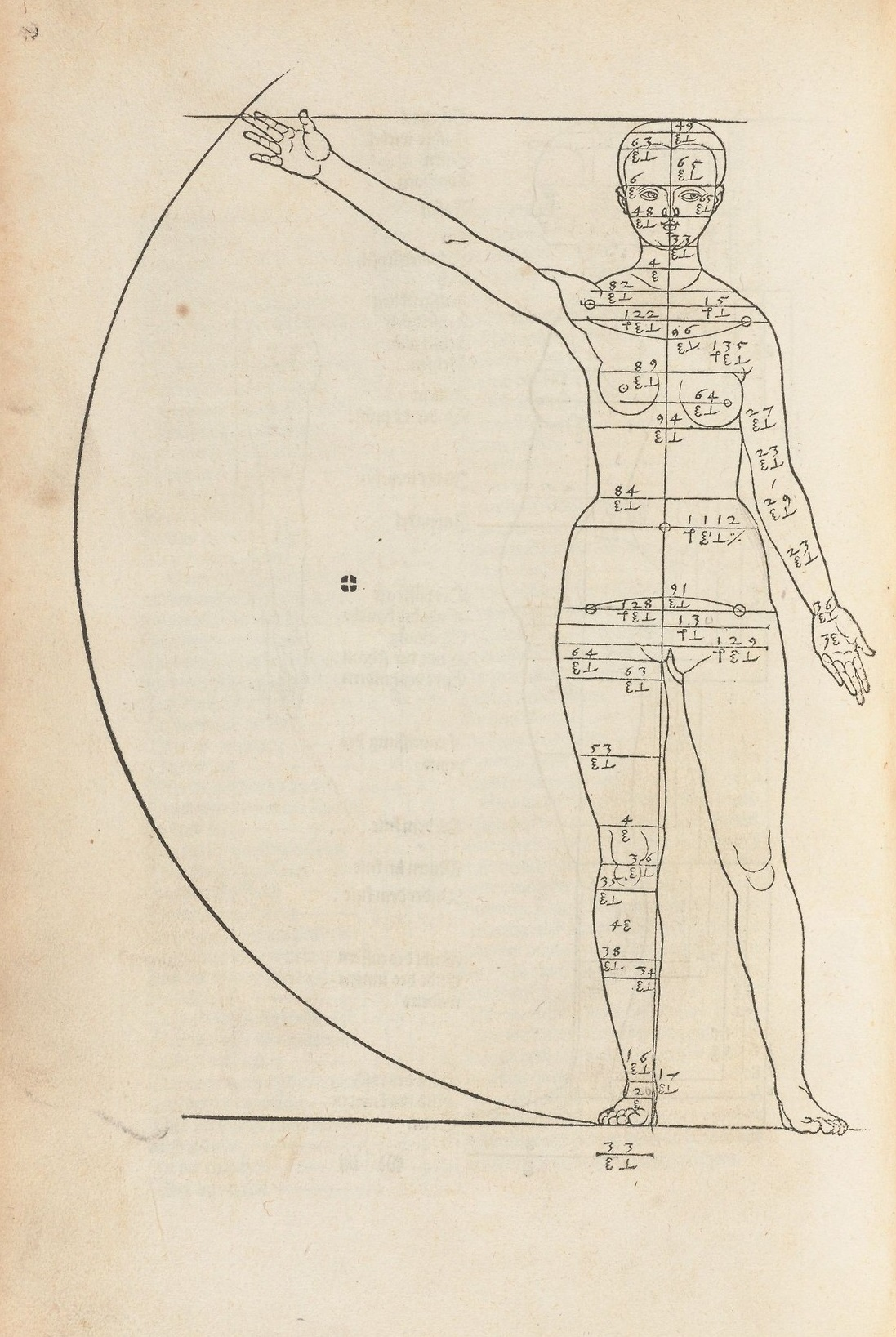

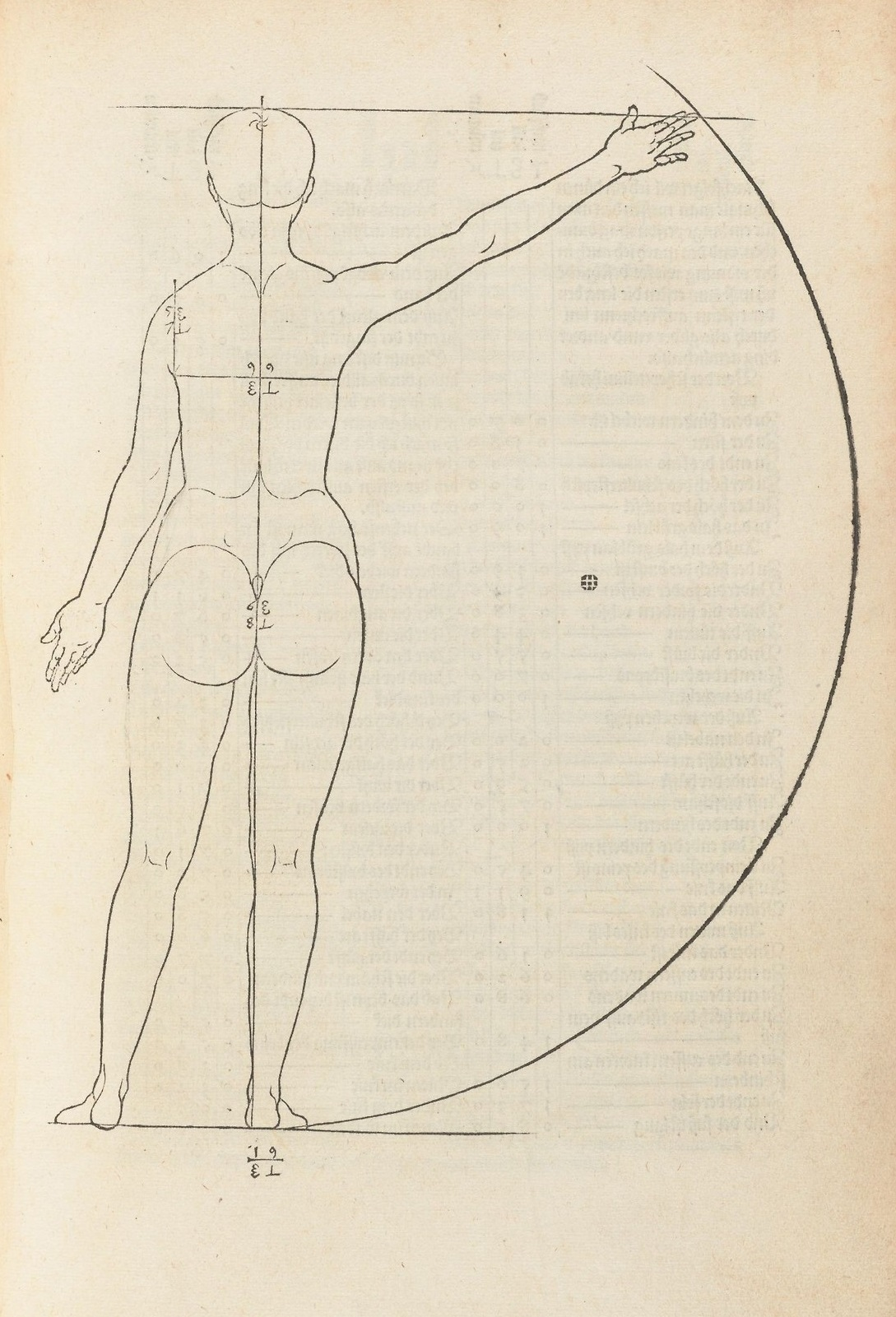

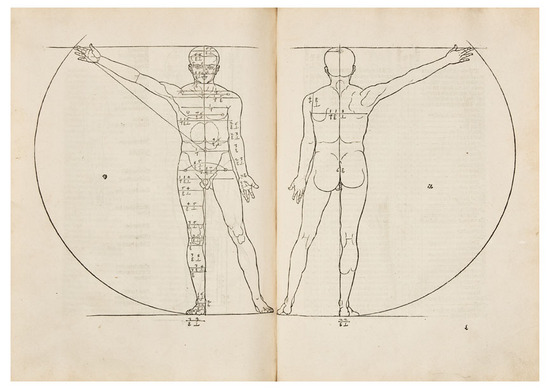

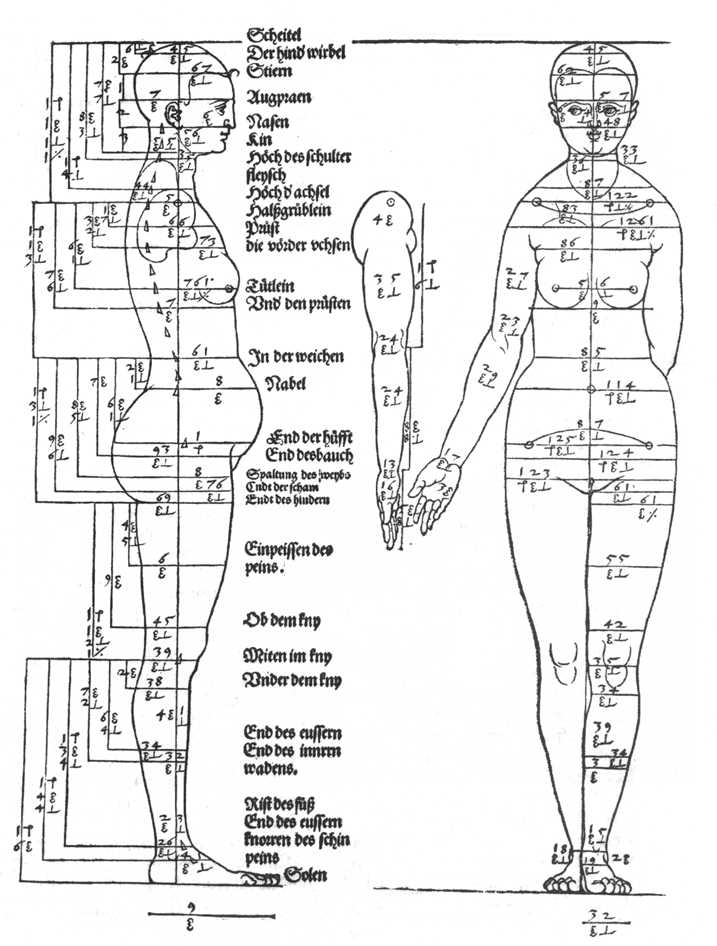

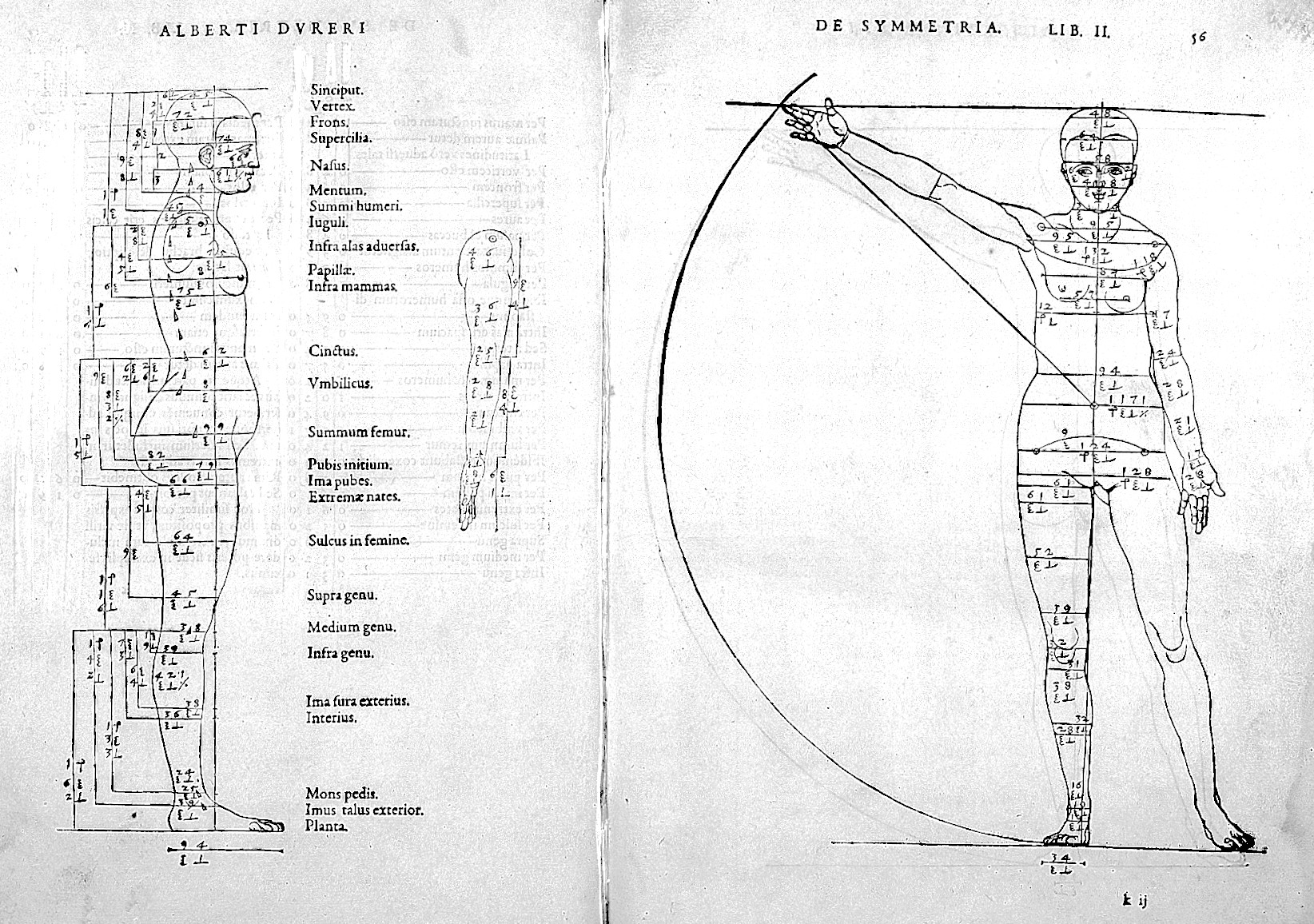

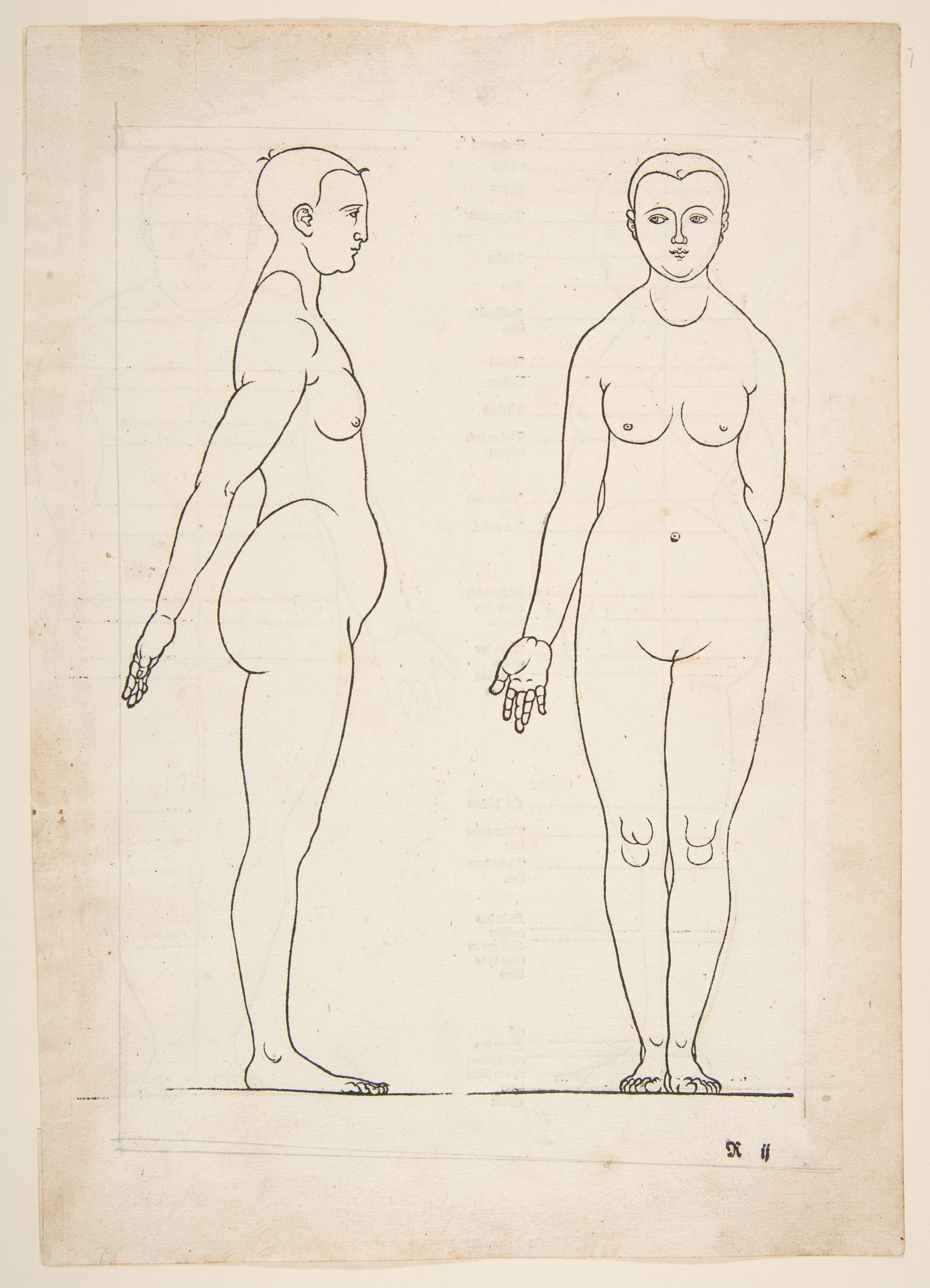

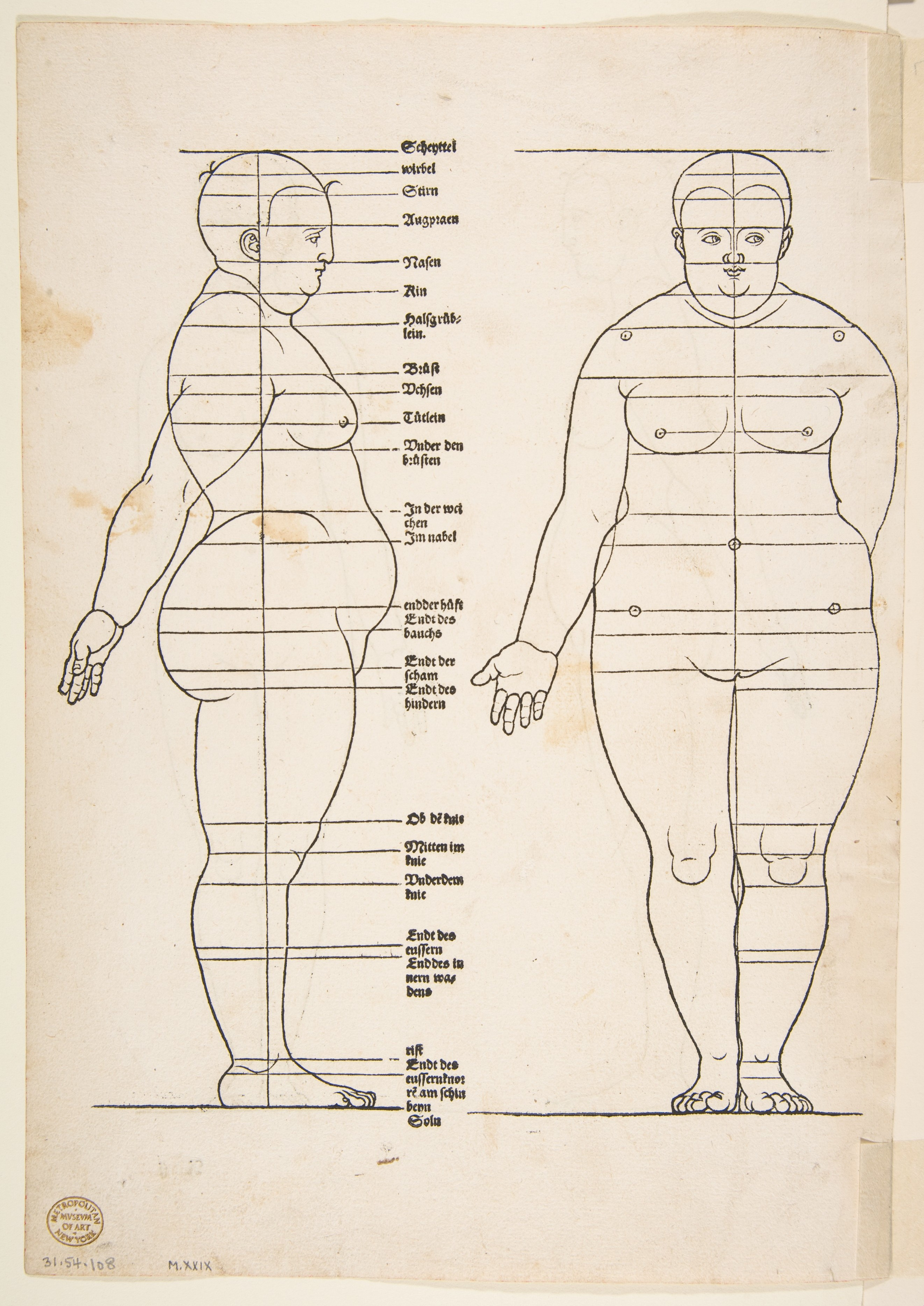

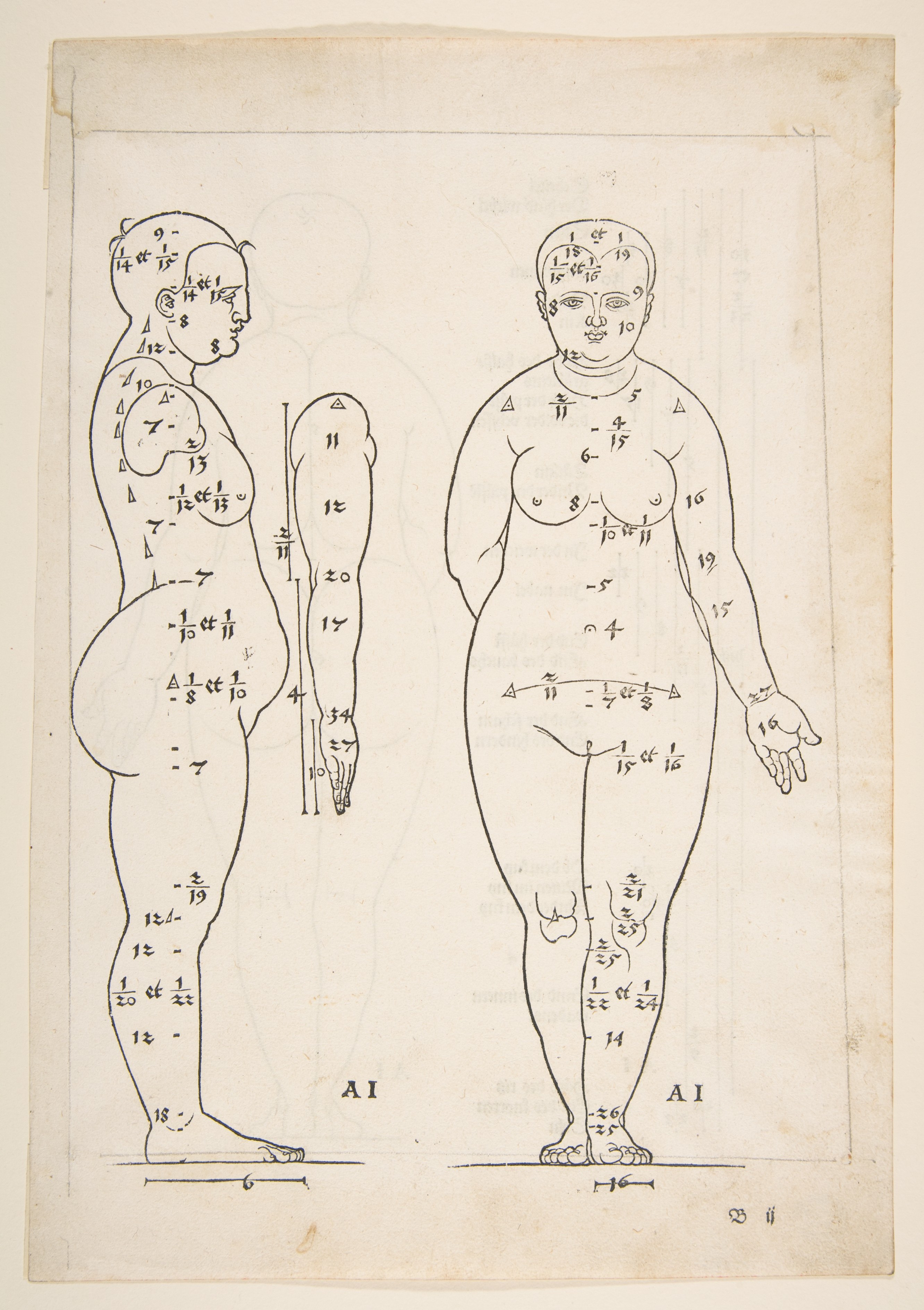

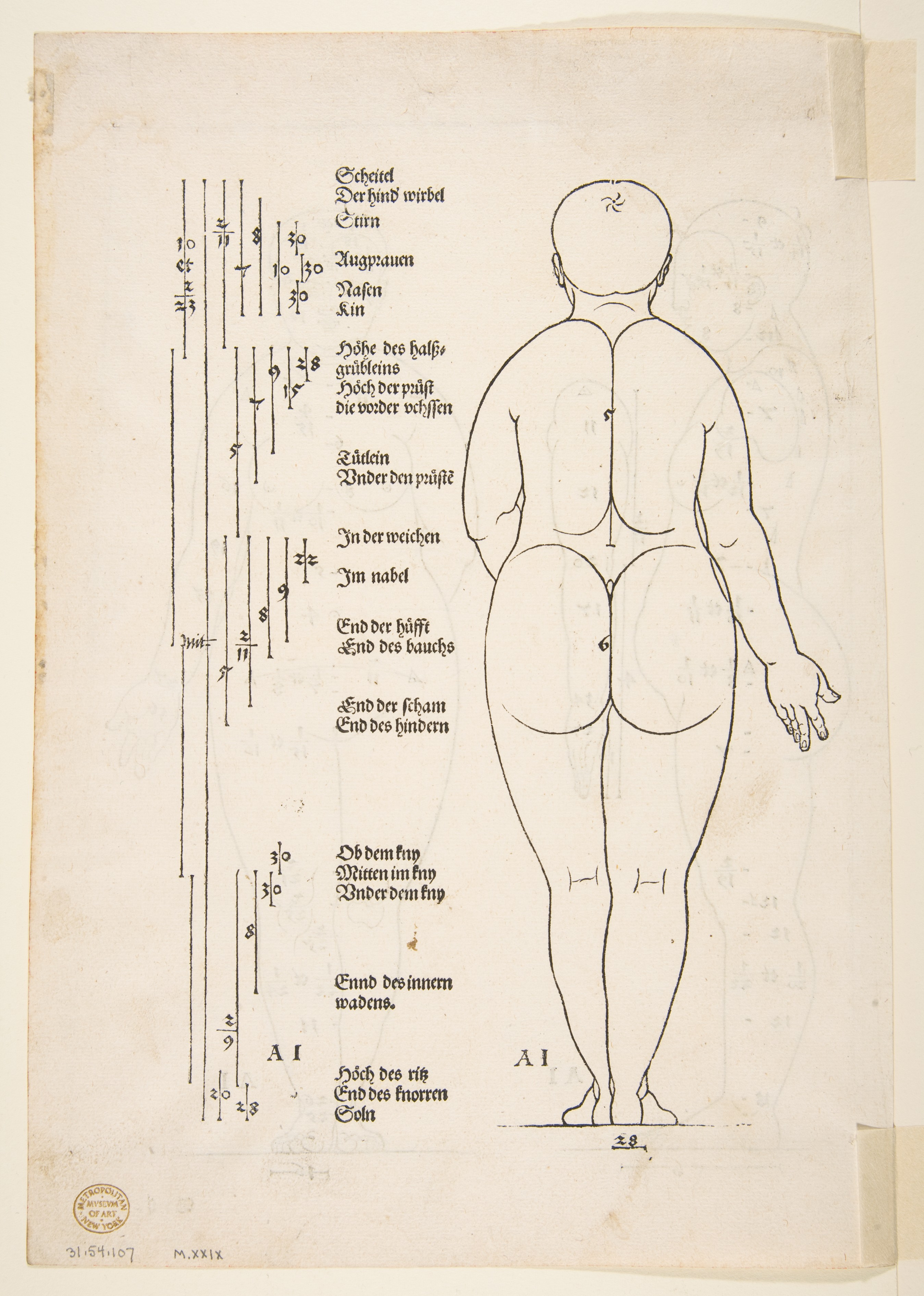

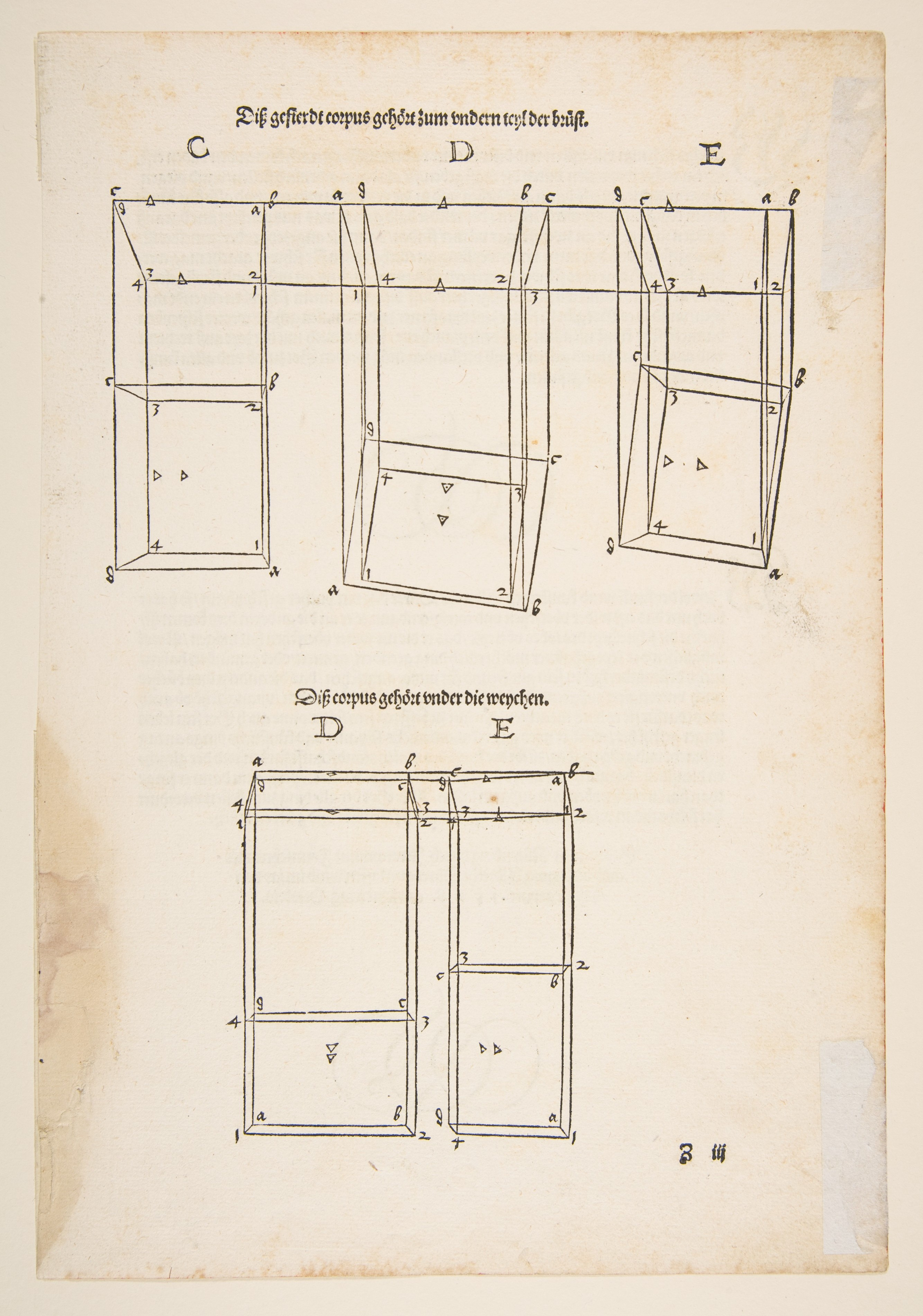

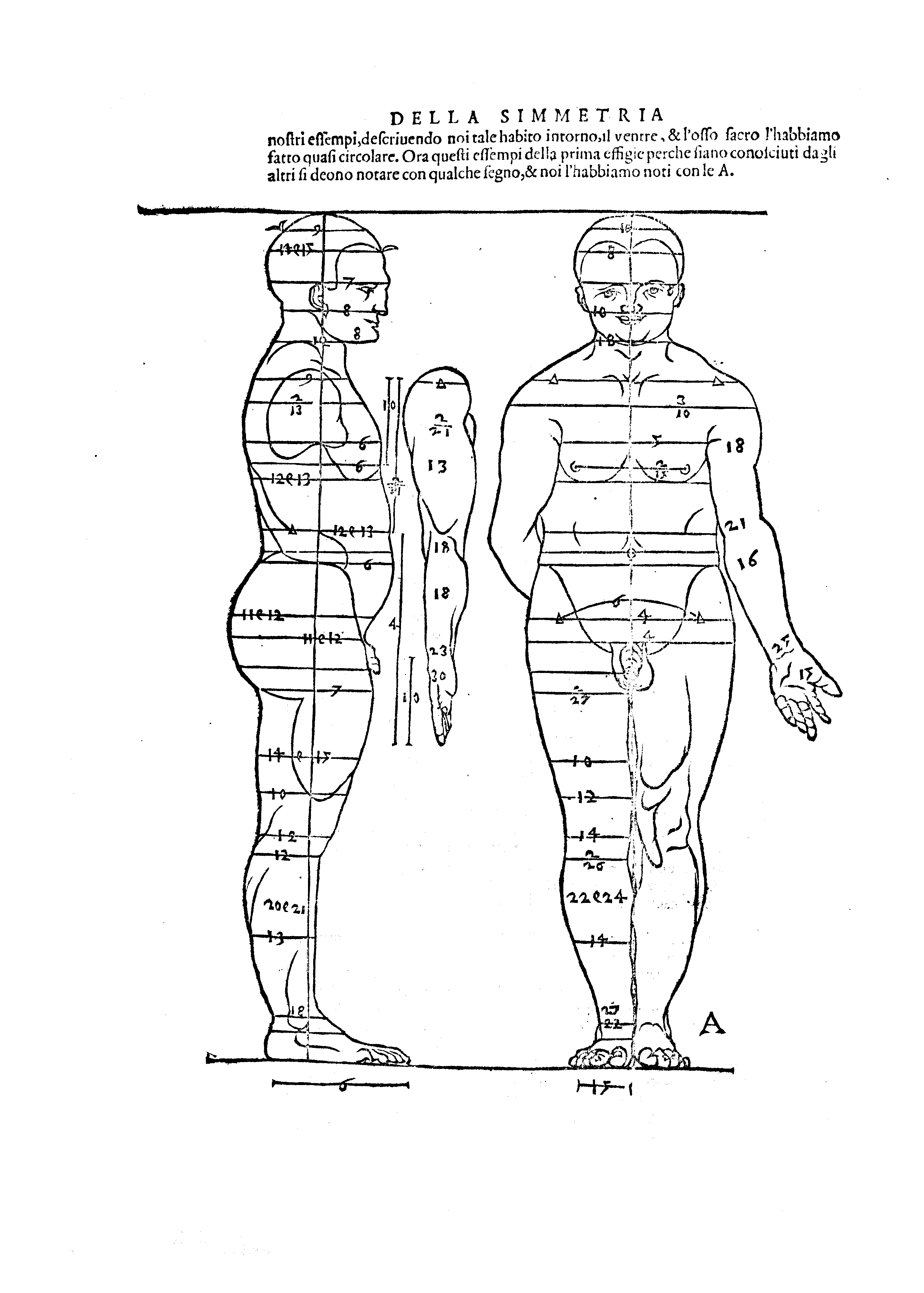

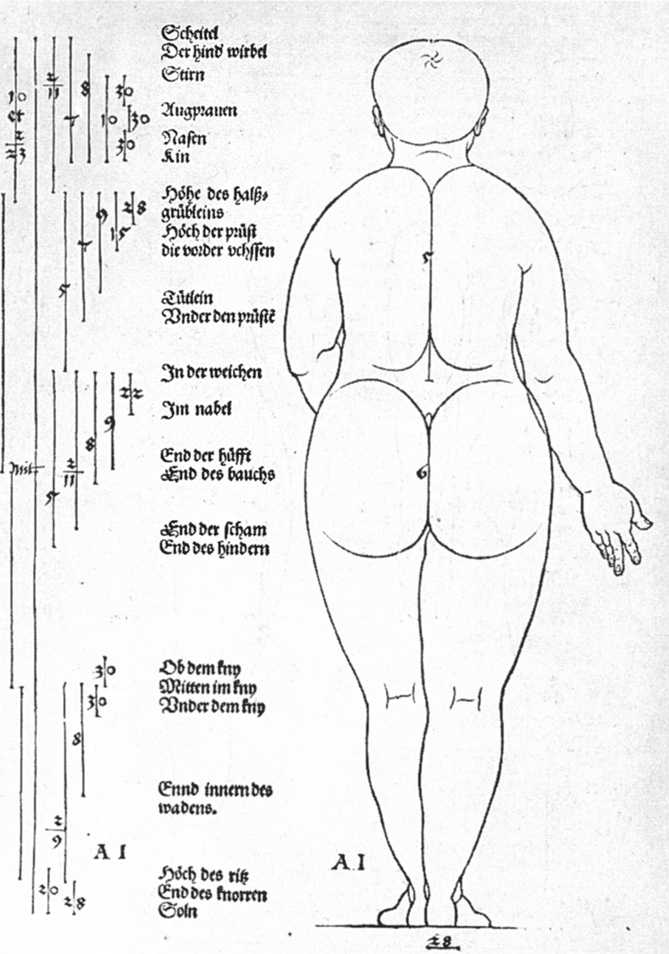

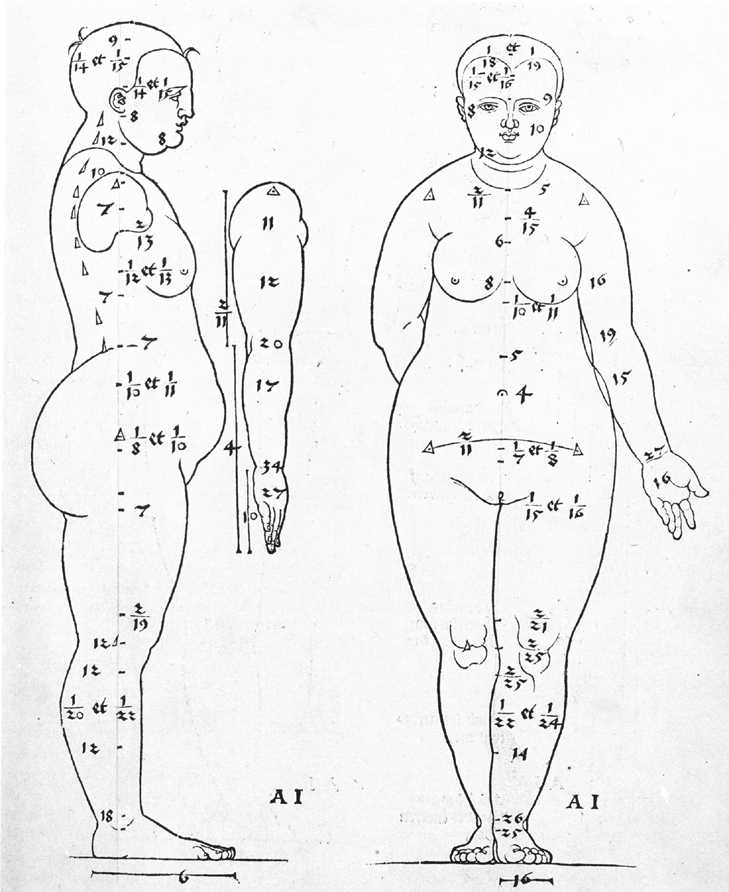

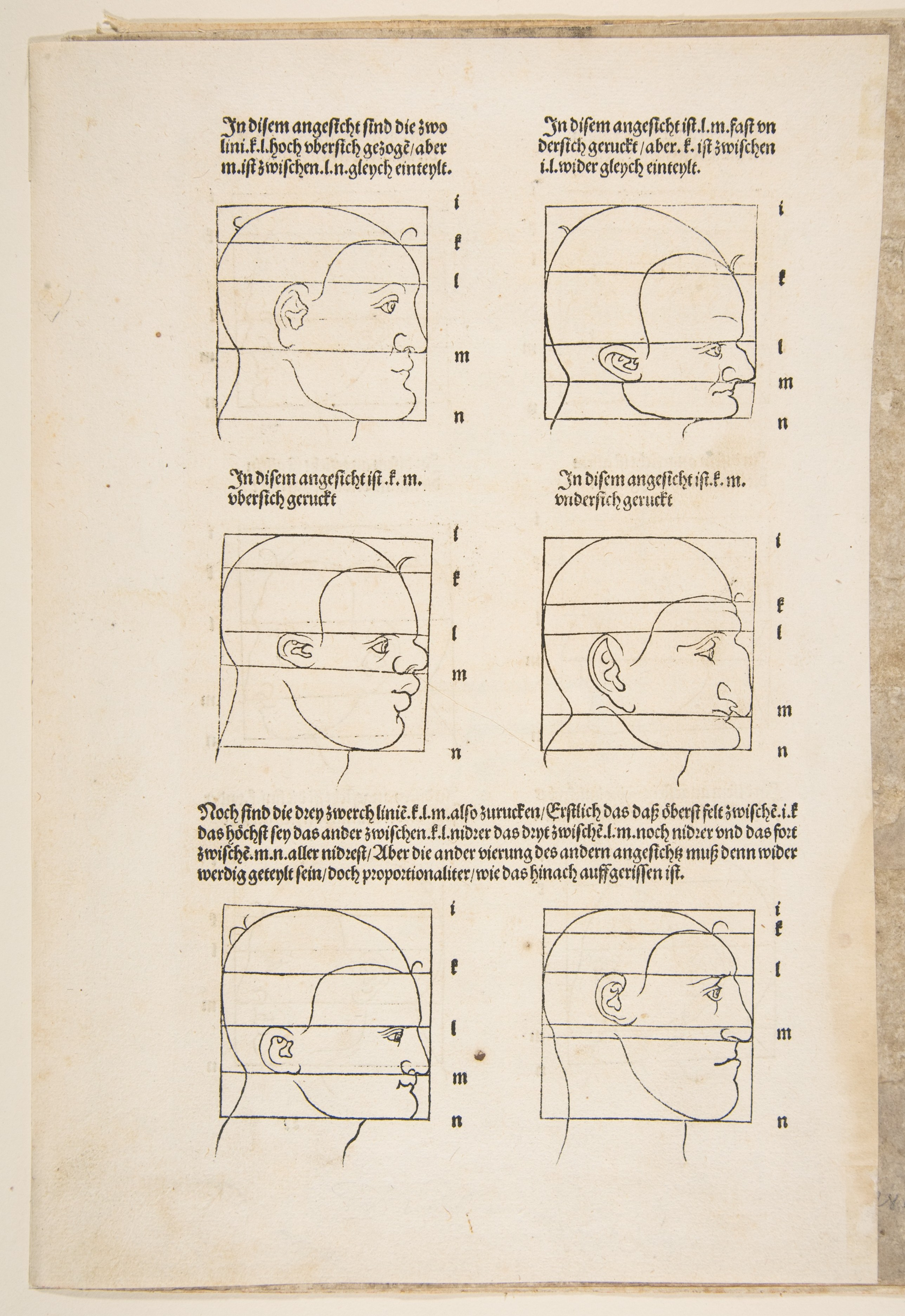

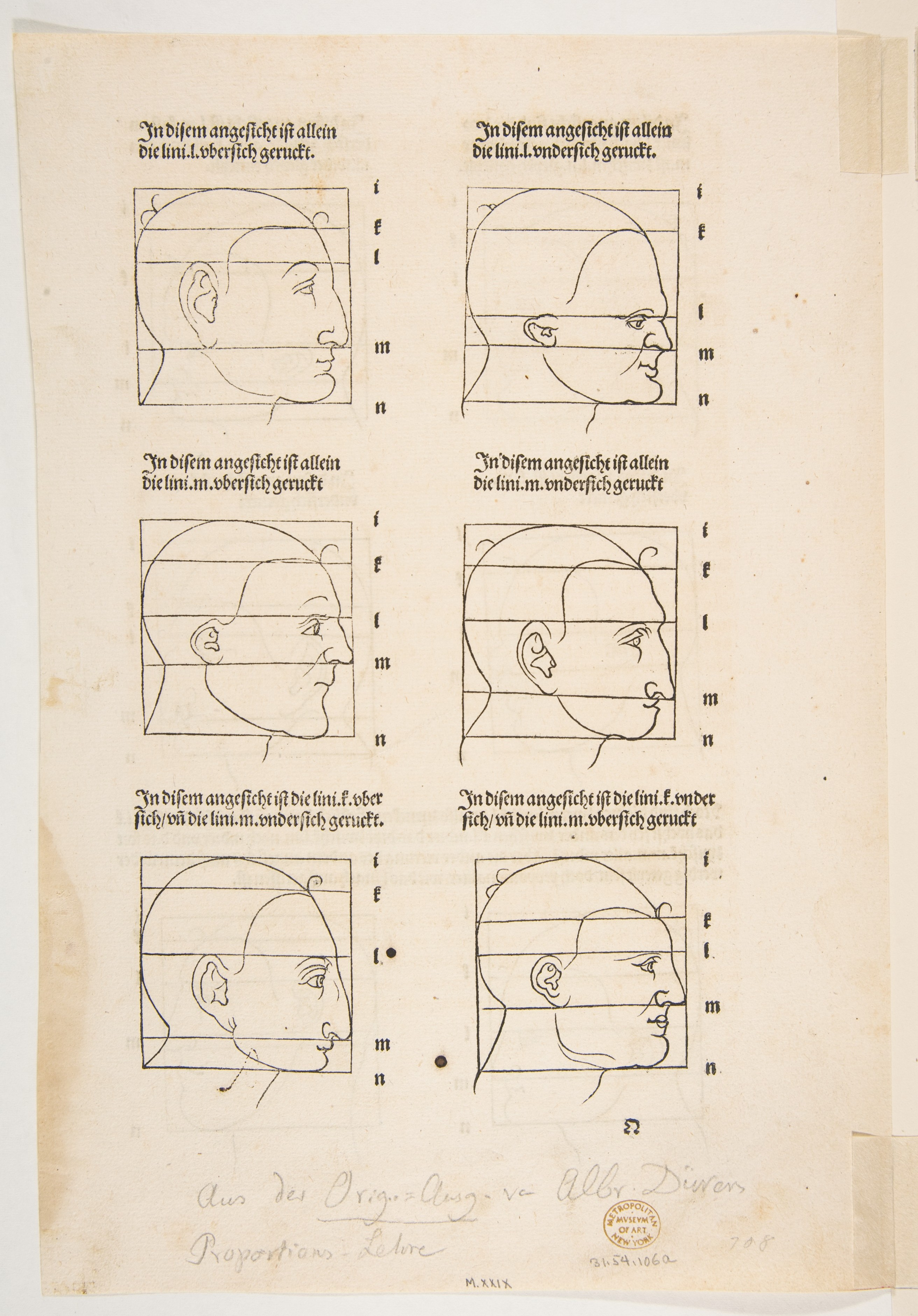

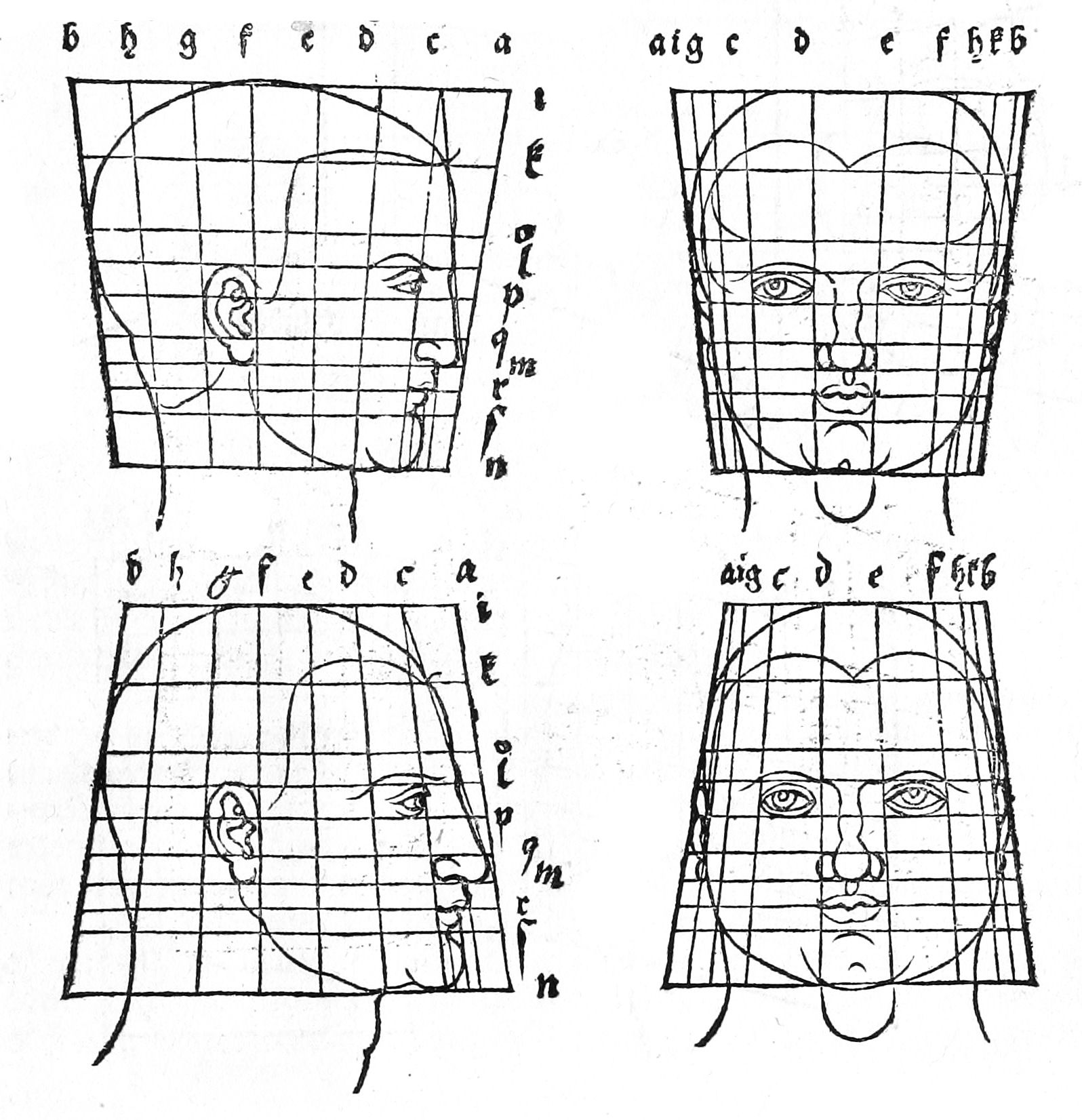

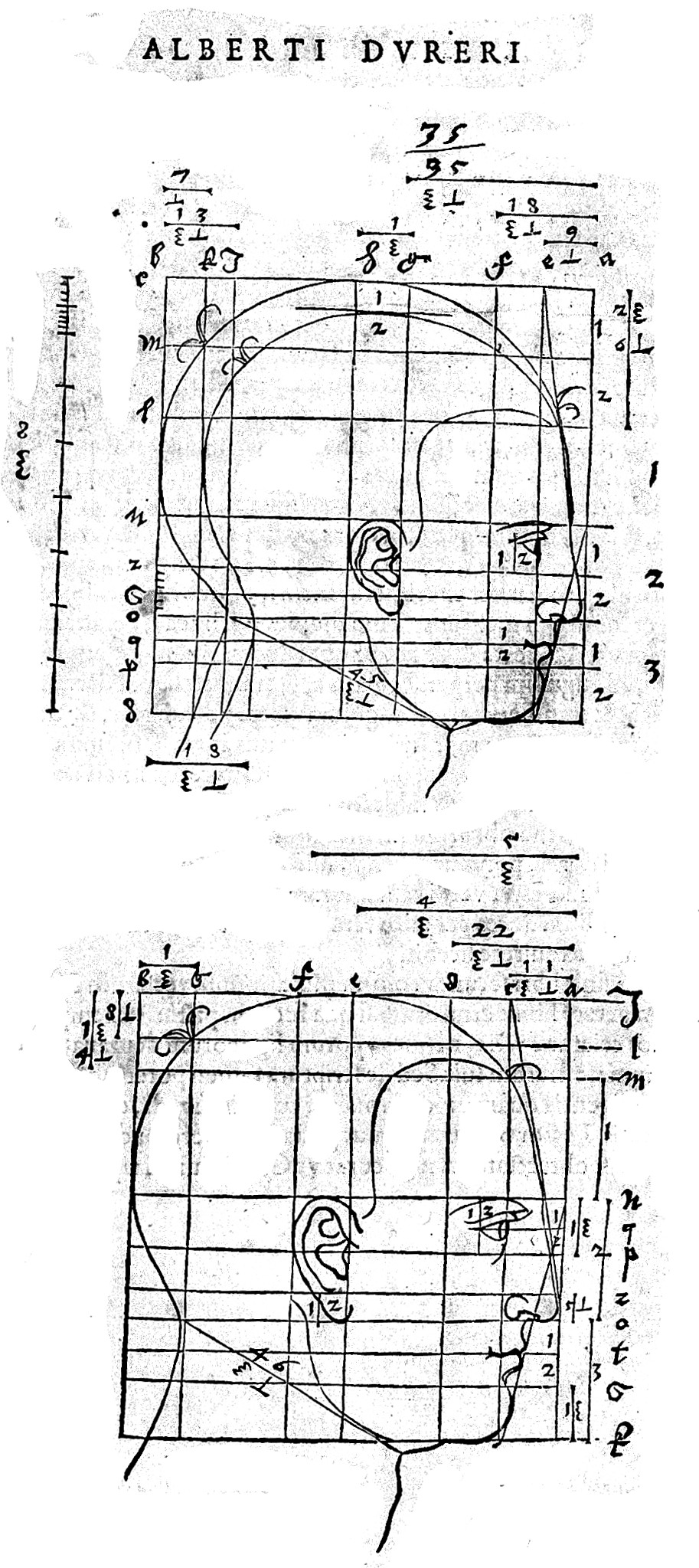

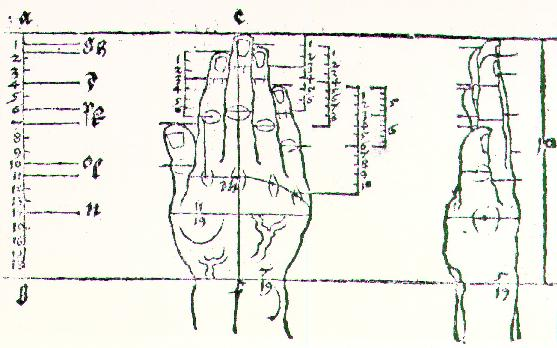

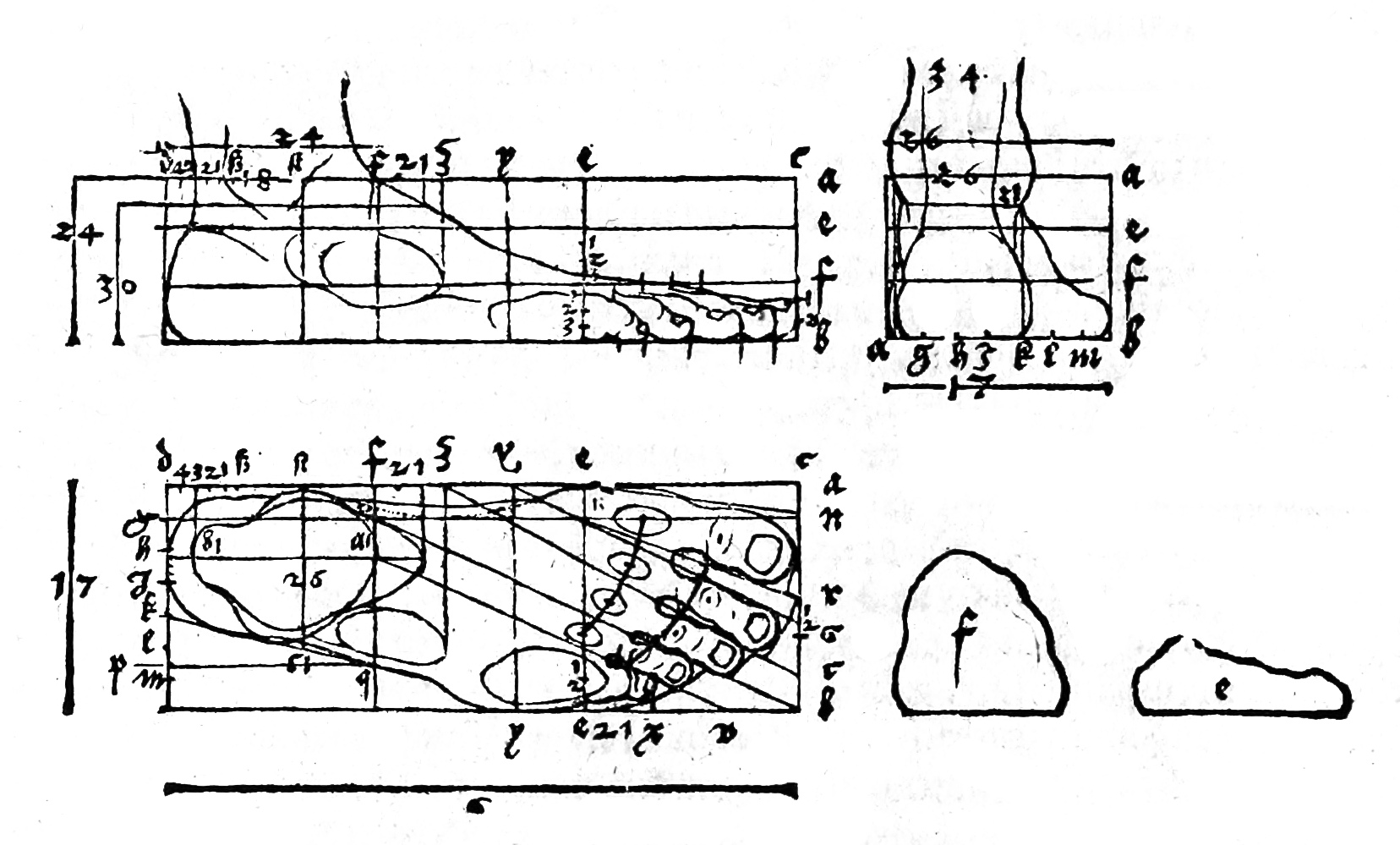

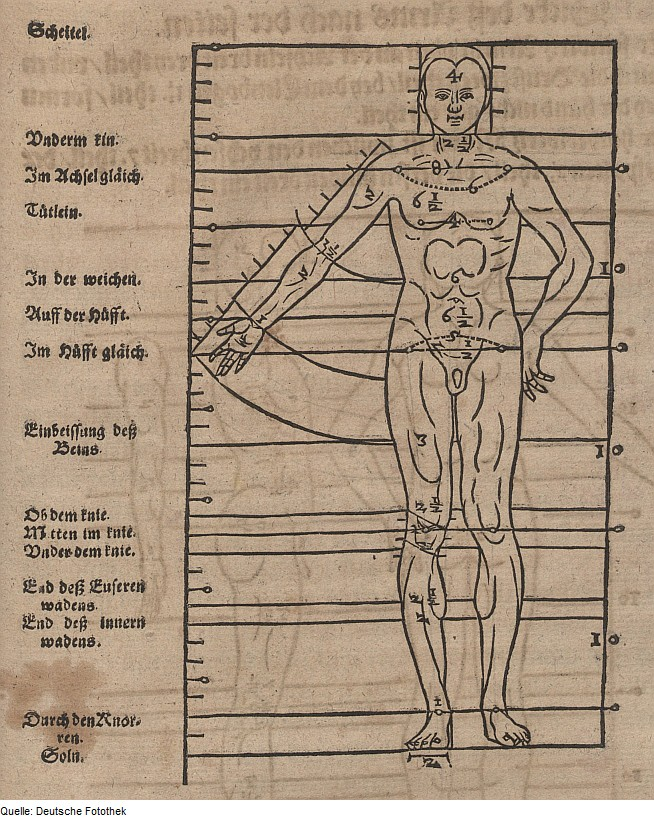

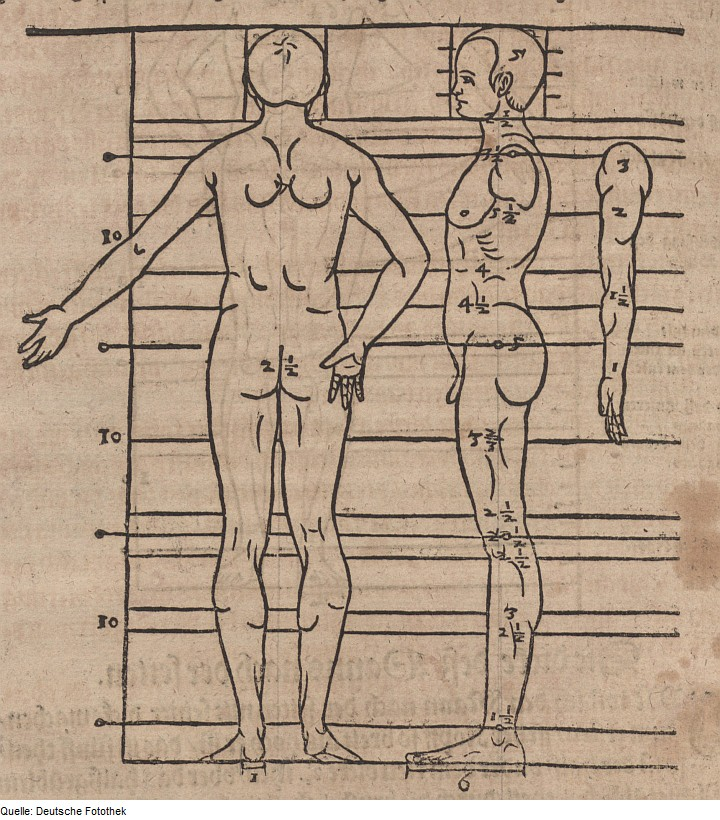

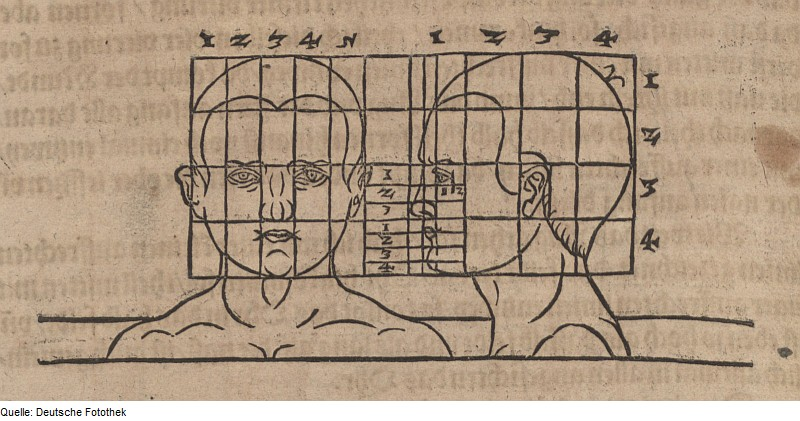

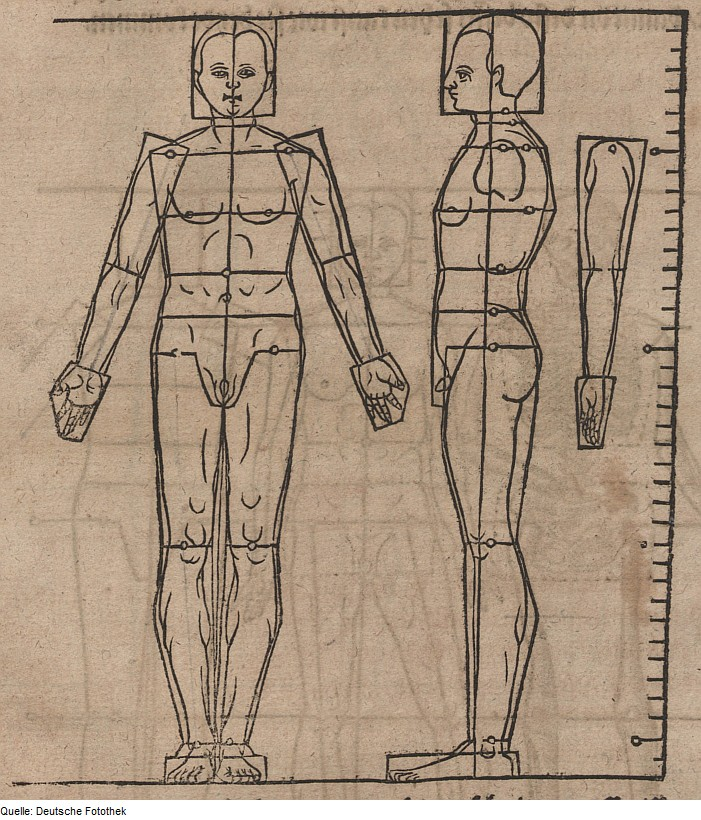

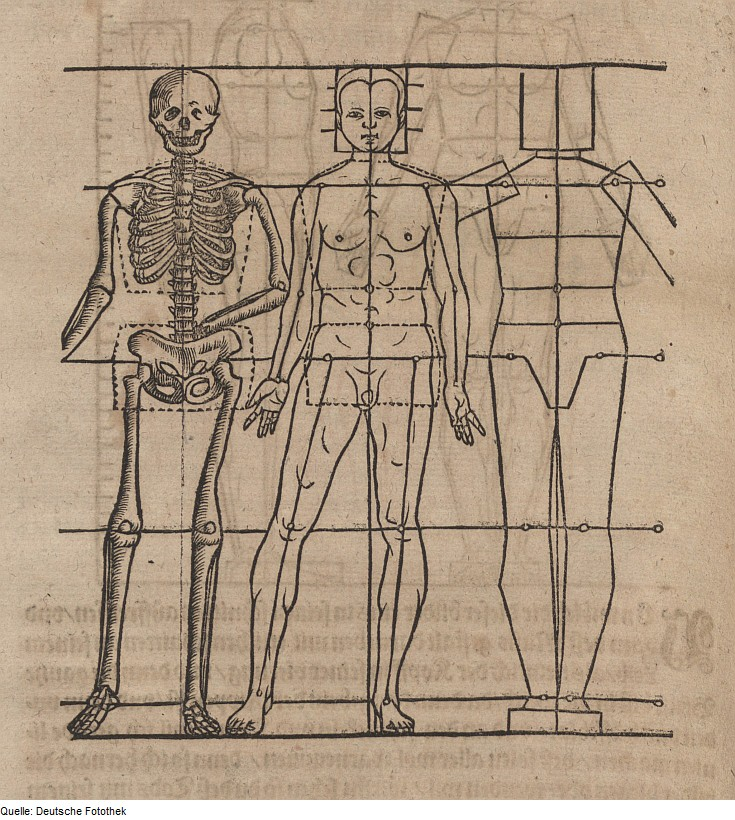

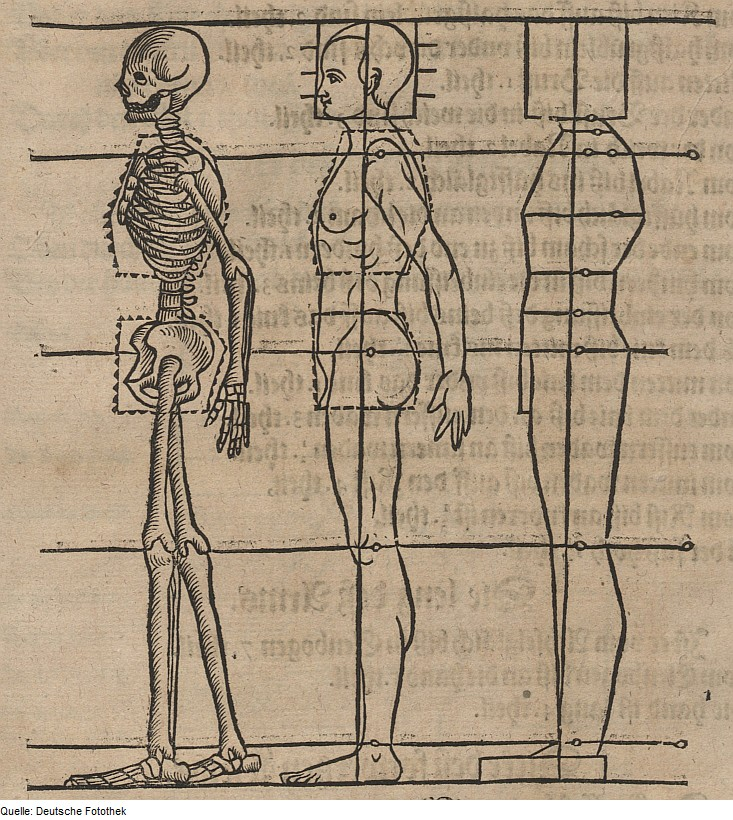

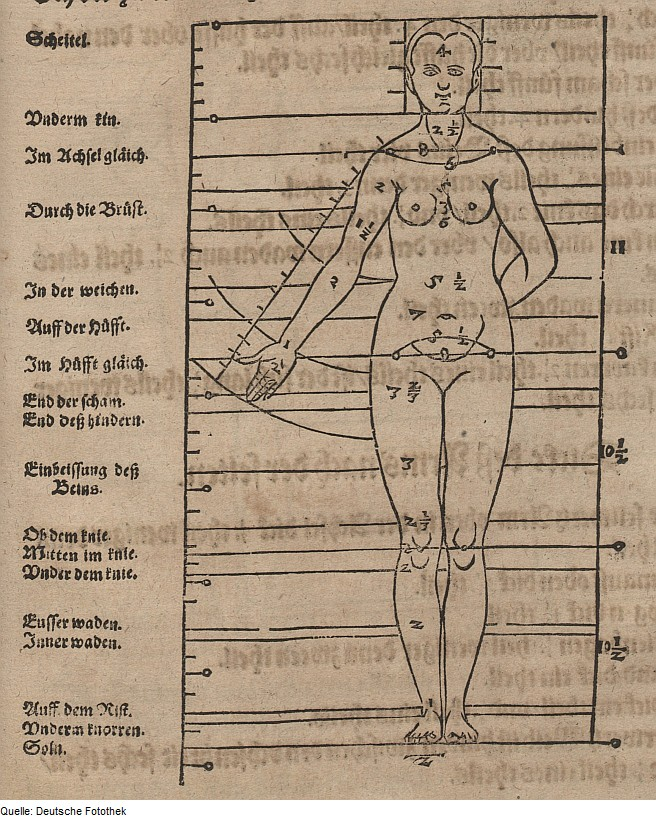

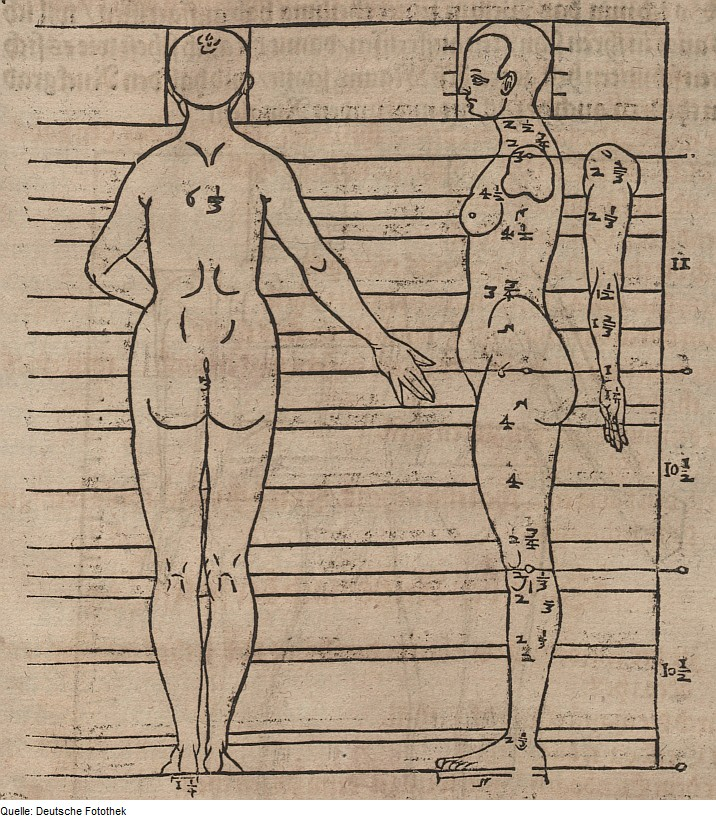

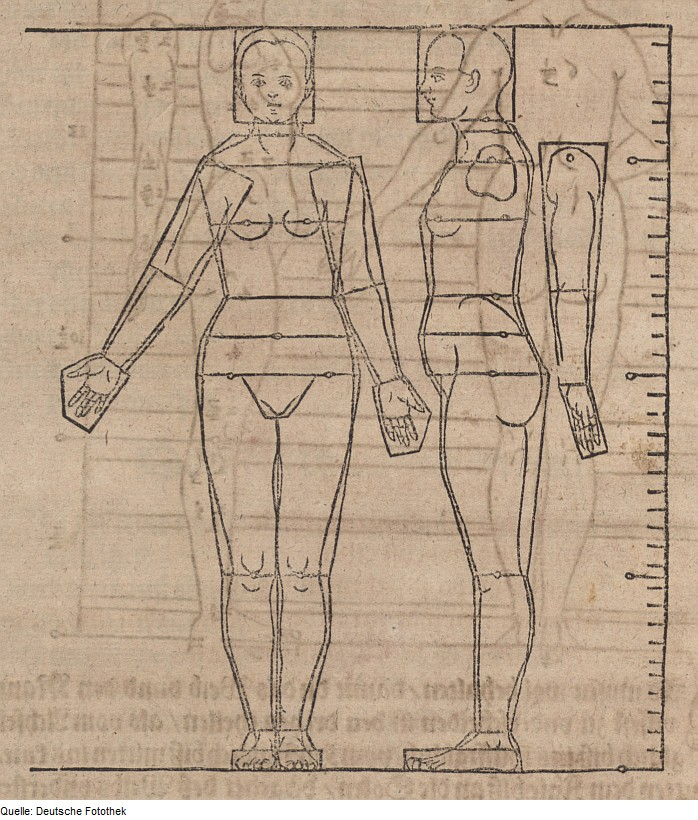

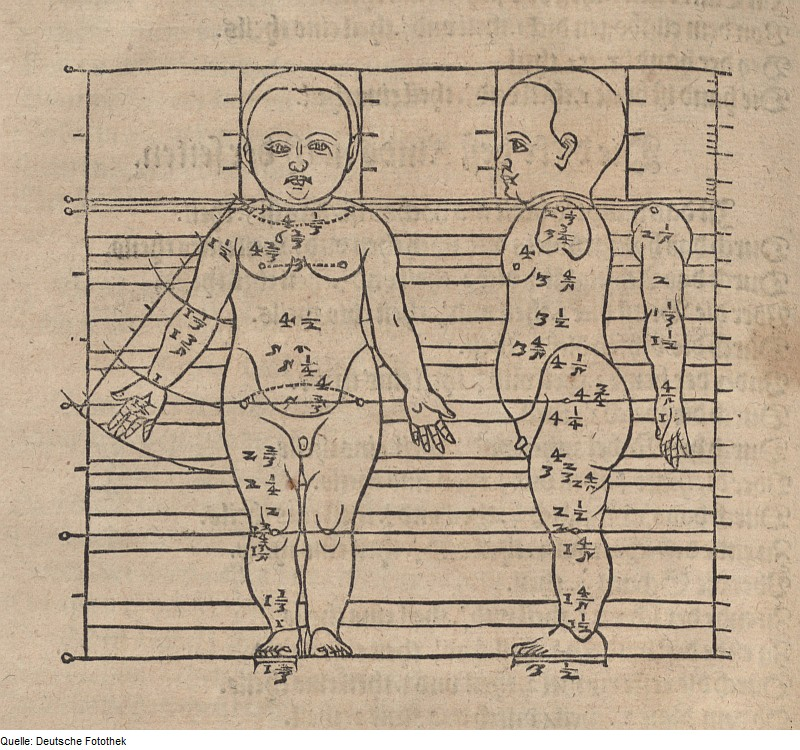

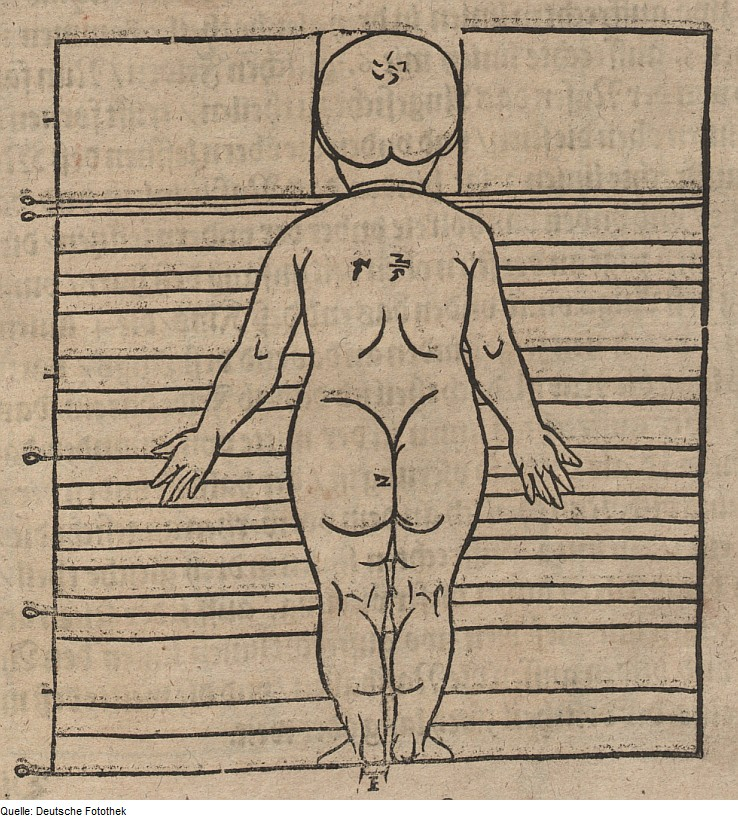

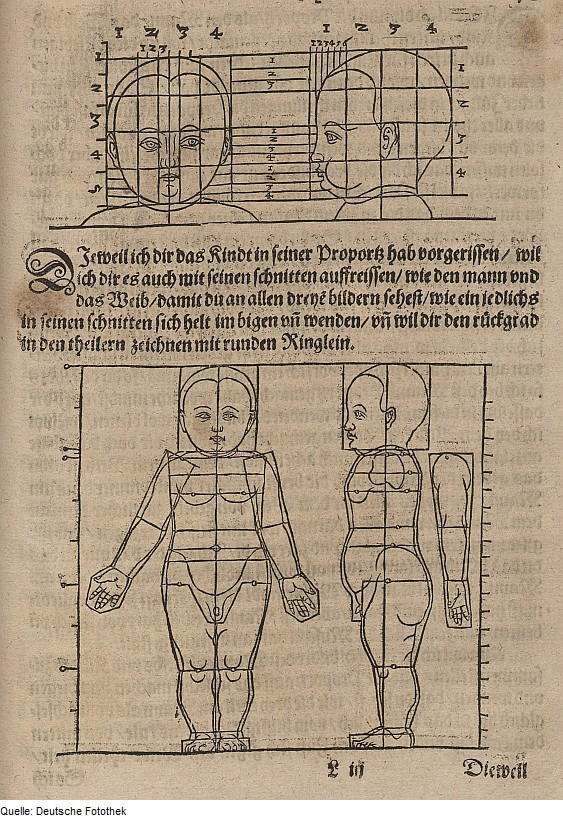

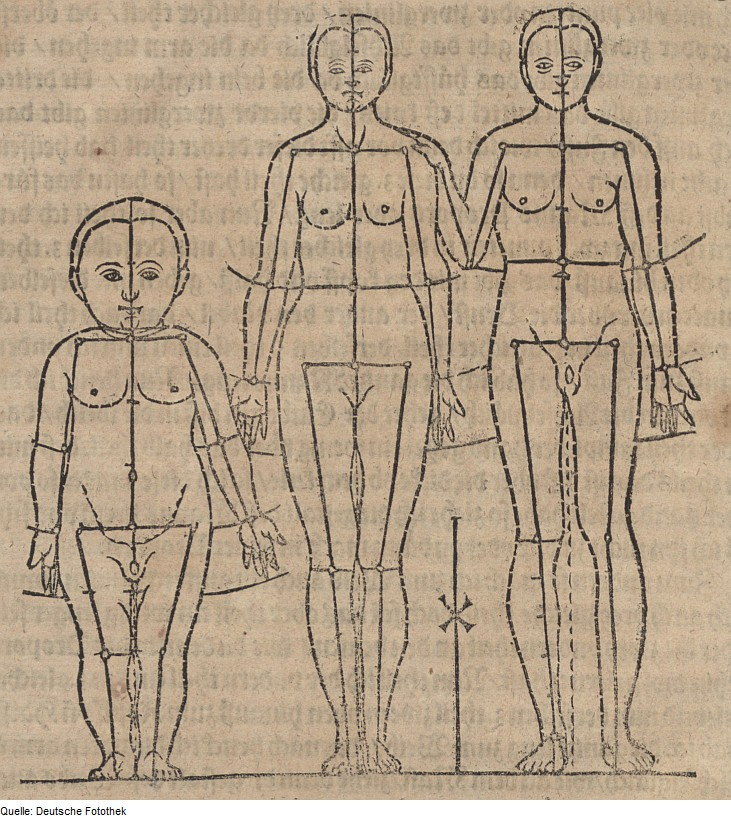

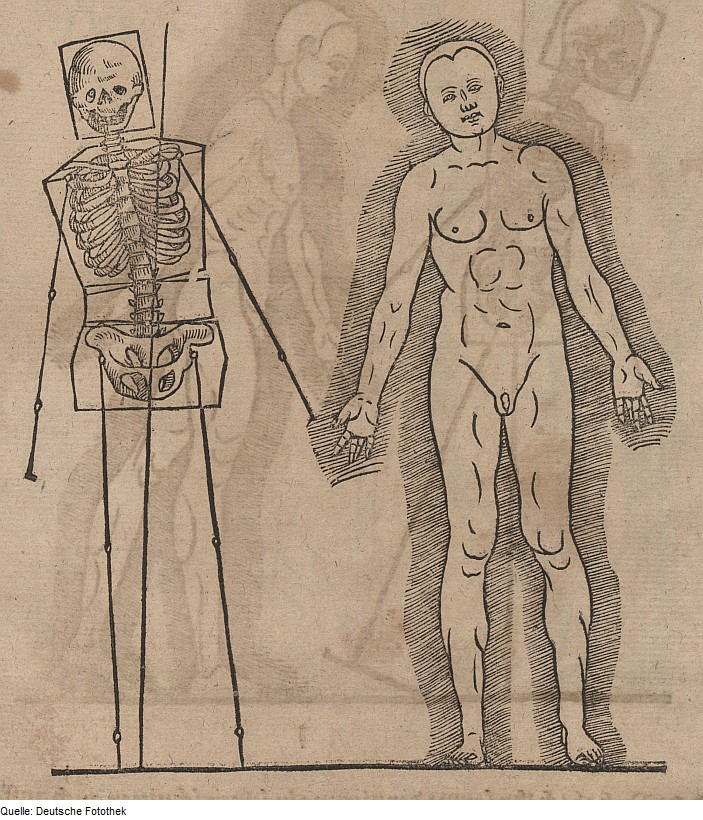

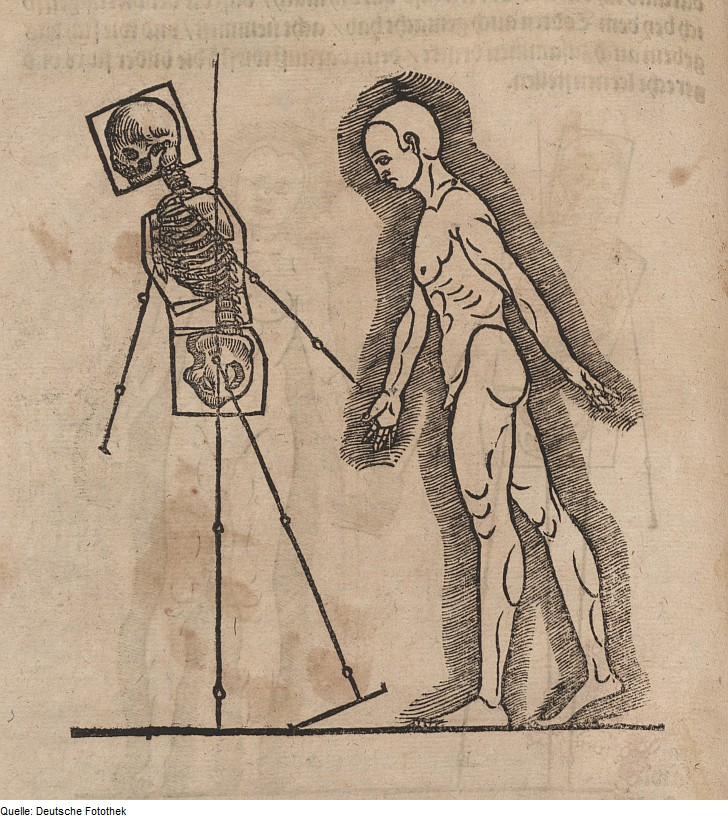

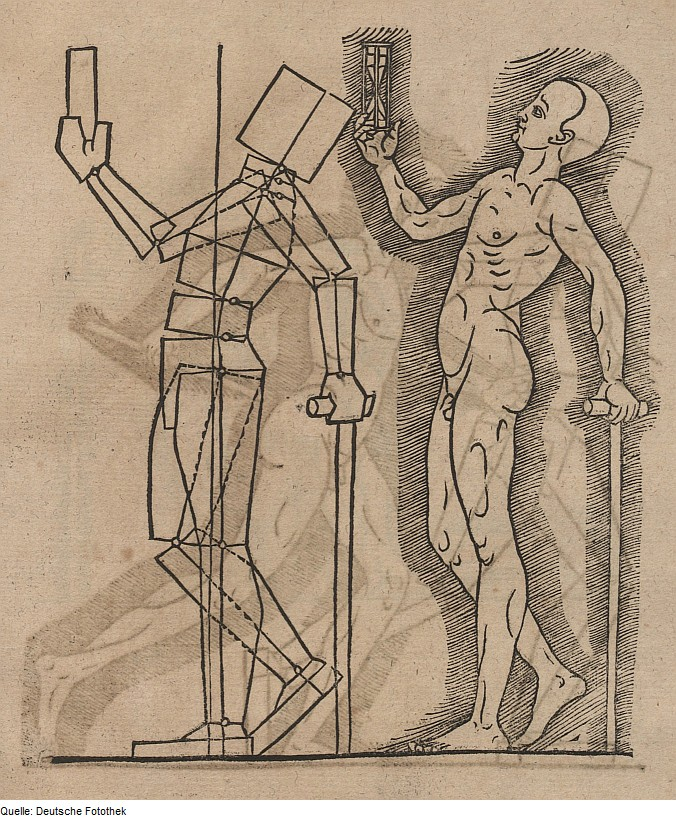

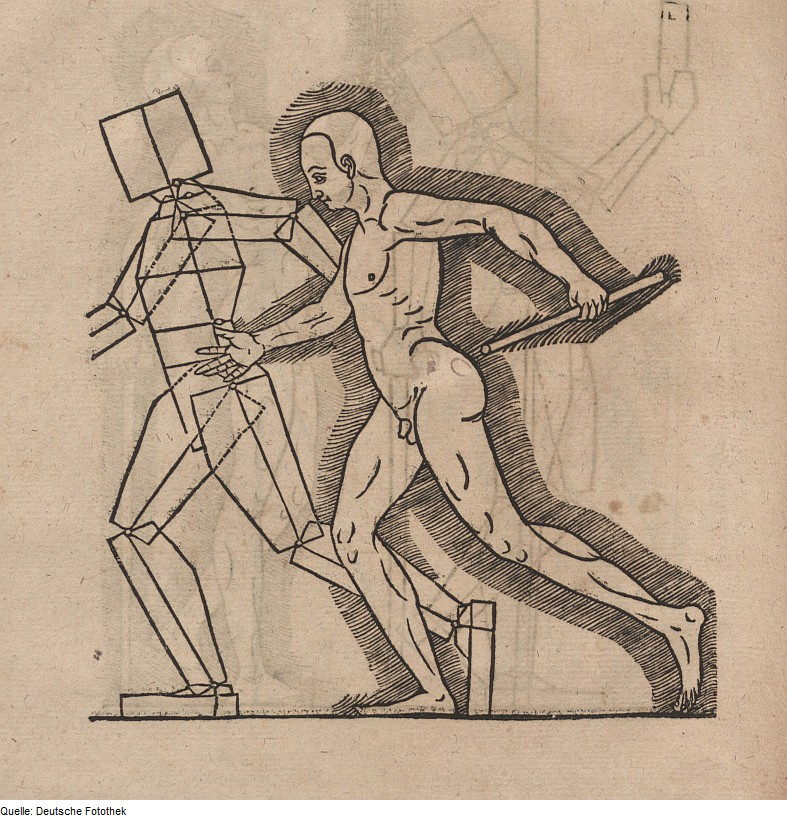

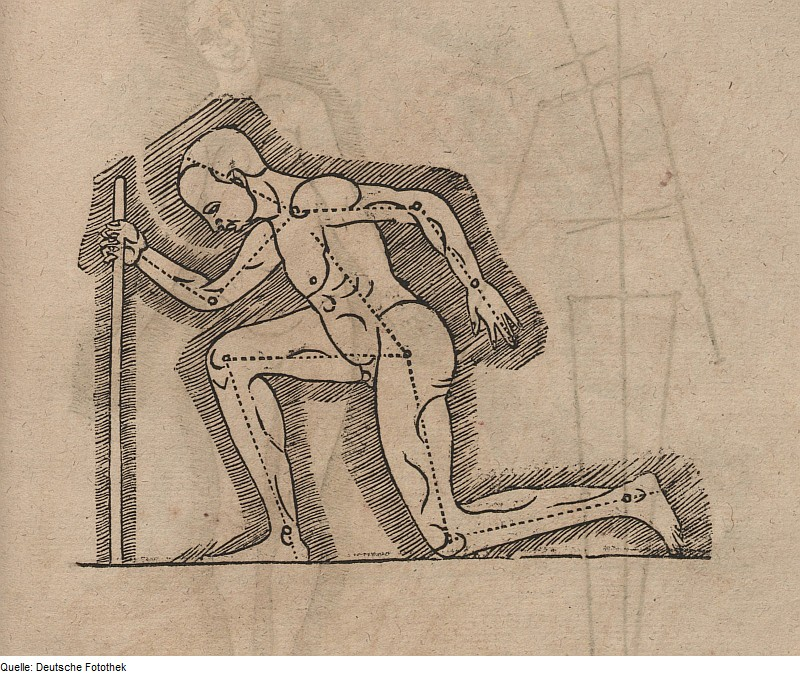

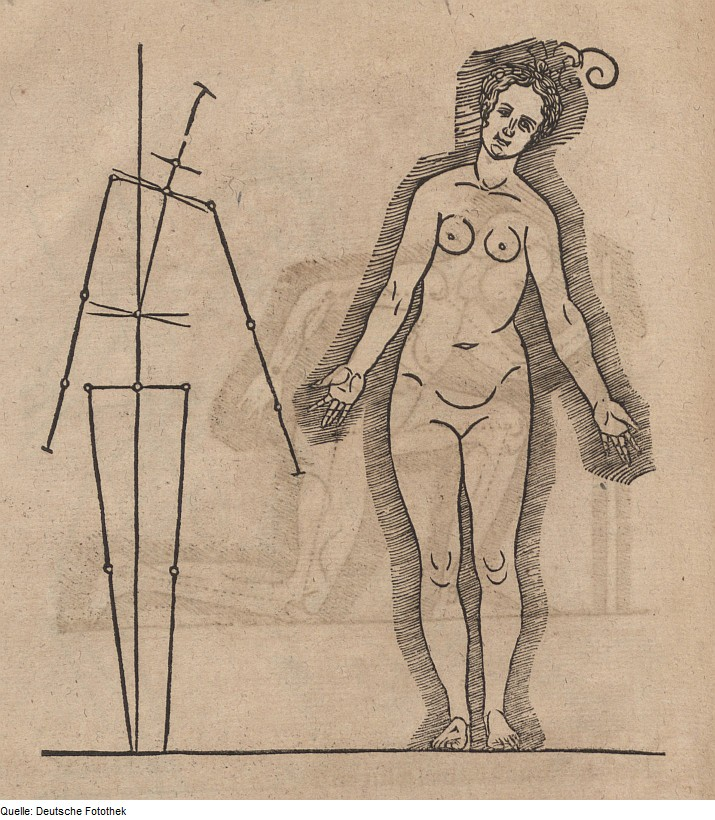

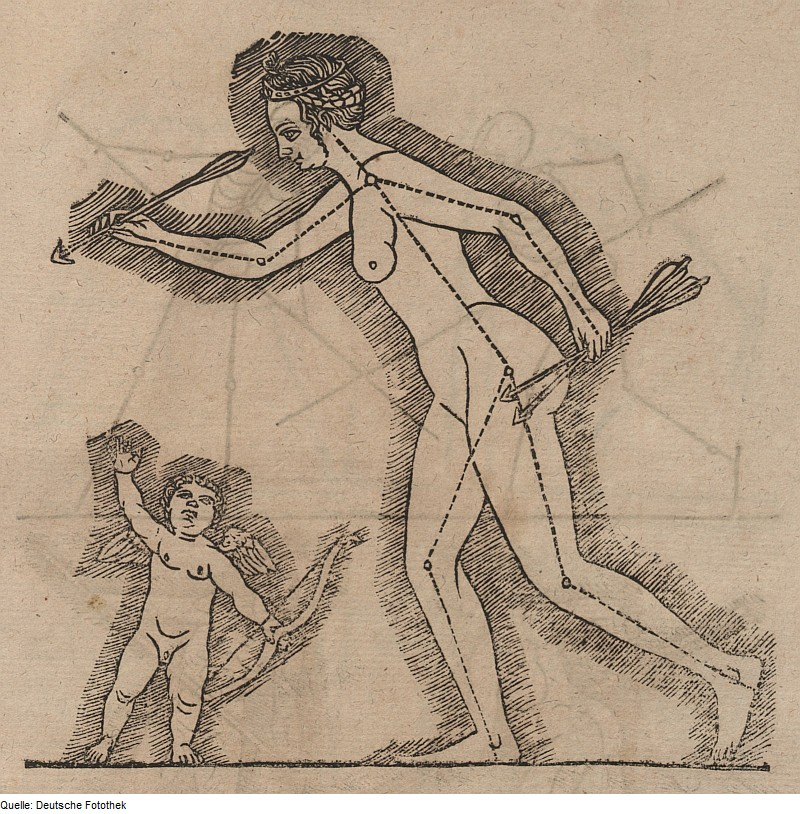

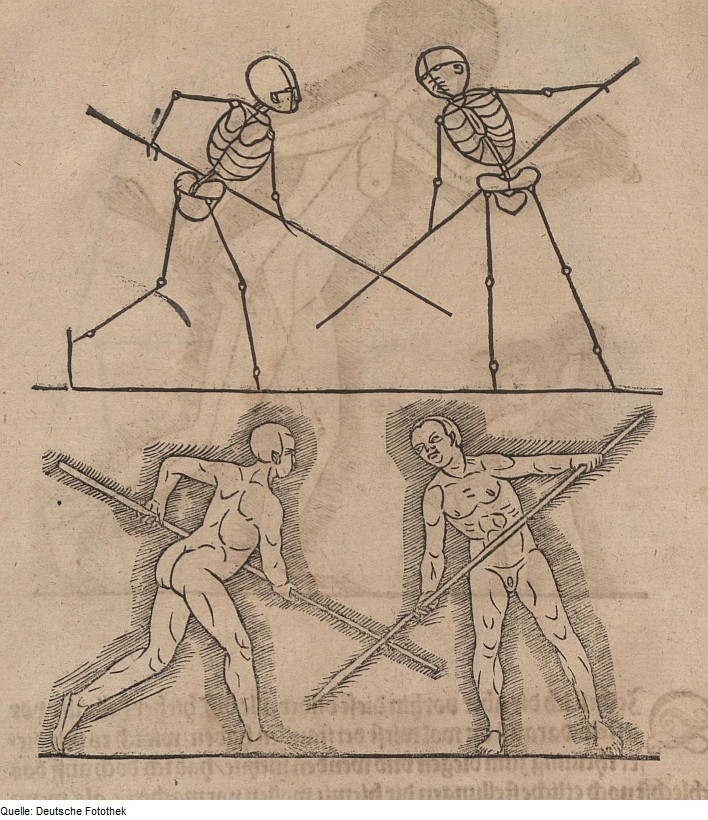

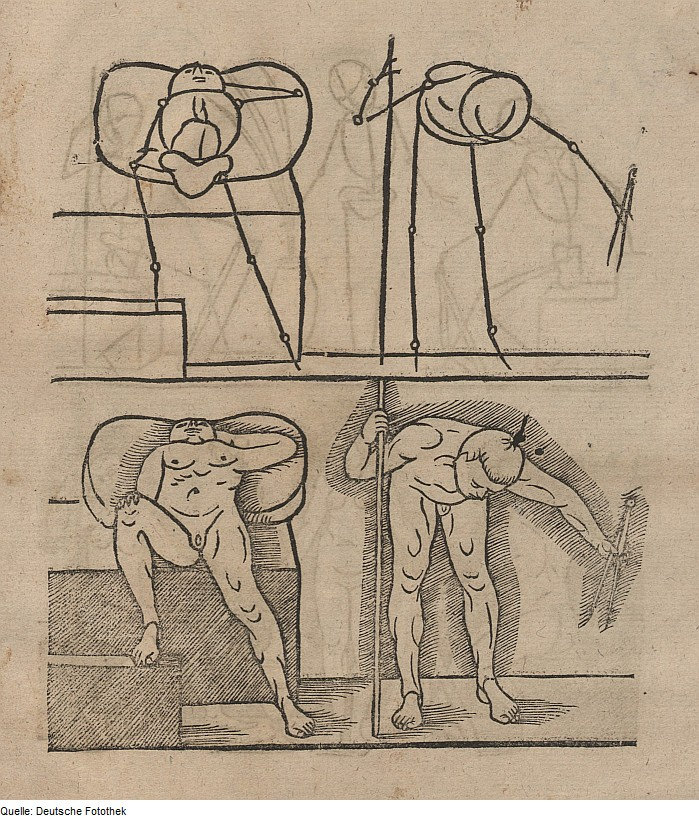

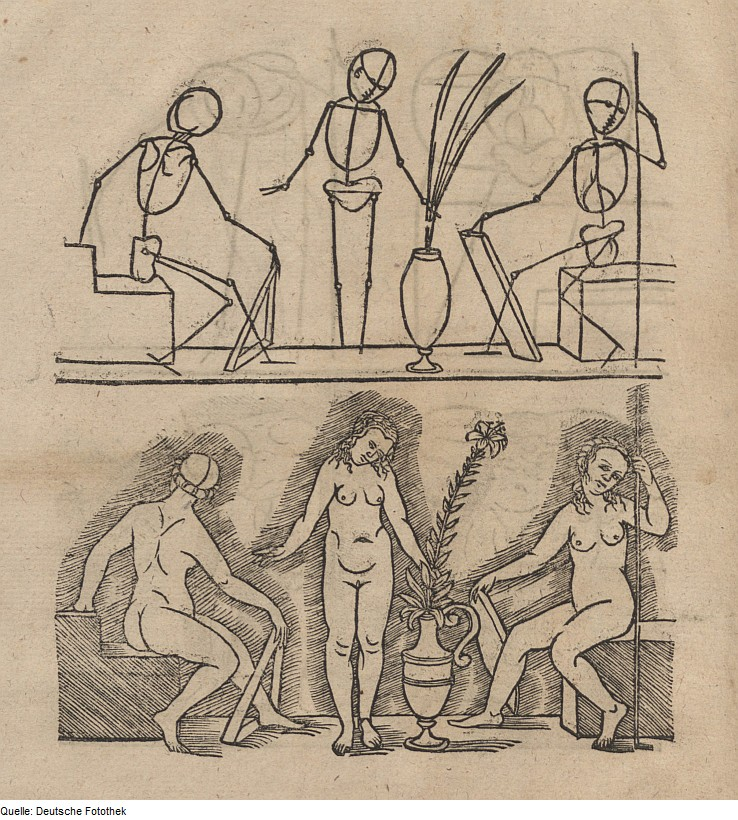

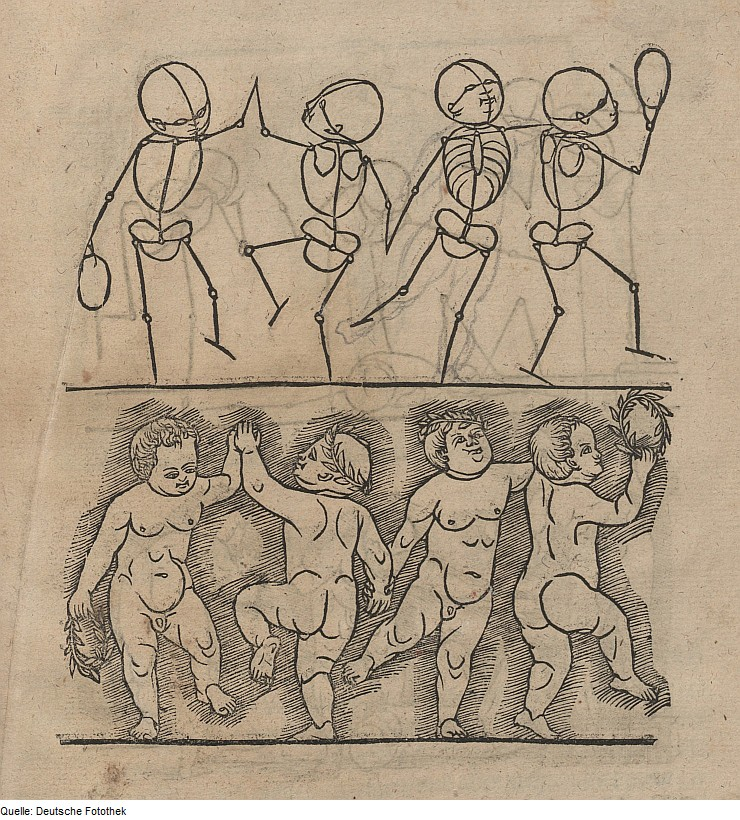

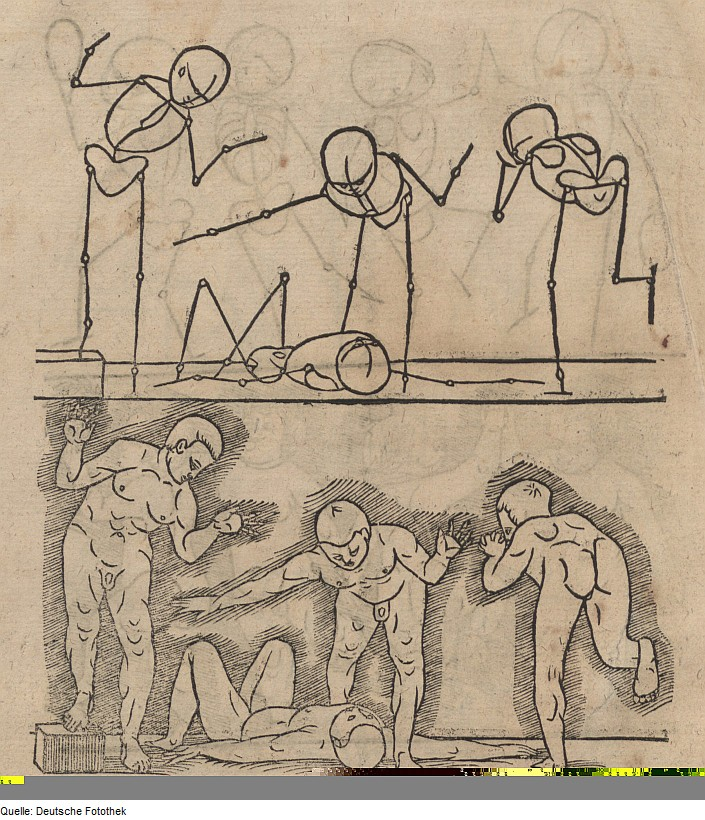

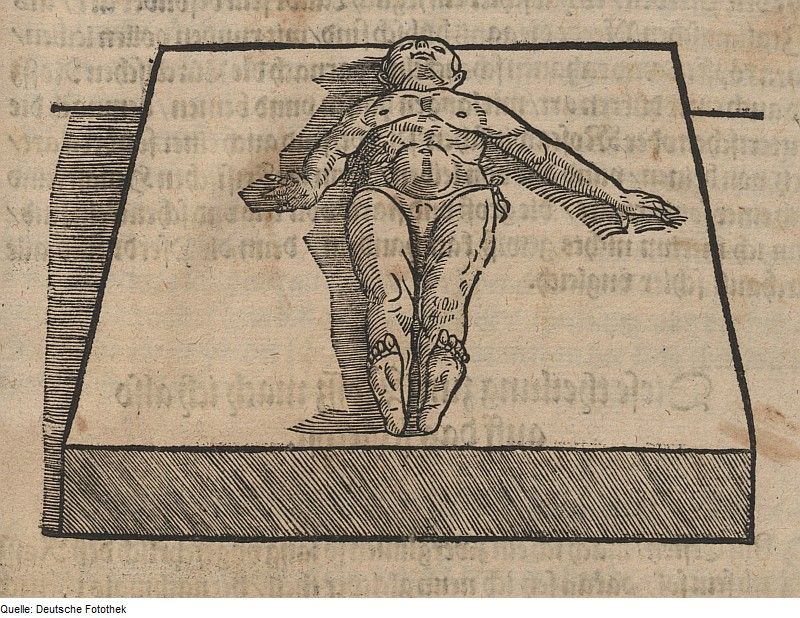

== See also ==
- List of engravings by Albrecht Dürer
- List of paintings by Albrecht Dürer

== Additional Sources ==
- Borer (Alain) & Bon (Cécile). L'oeuvre Graphique De Albrecht Dürer. Hubschmid & Bouret. 1980.
