= Presentation at the Temple (disambiguation) =

The Presentation at the Temple is a biblical episode in the life of Jesus. (Not to be confused with the apocryphal event of the Presentation of Mary.)

It may also refer to one of the following paintings:

- Presentation at the Temple (Bellini)
- Presentation at the Temple (Fra Angelico)
- Presentation of Christ in the Temple (Fra Bartolomeo)
- Presentation at the Temple (Ambrogio Lorenzetti)
- Presentation of Christ in the Temple (Lochner, 1445)
- Presentation in the Temple (Lotto)
- Presentation at the Temple (Mantegna)
- Presentation at the Temple (Tintoretto, Carmini), c.1542
- Presentation at the Temple (Tintoretto, Gallerie dell'Accademia)
