= Christ Among the Doctors (Dürer) =

1506 painting by Albrecht Dürer

Christ among the Doctors
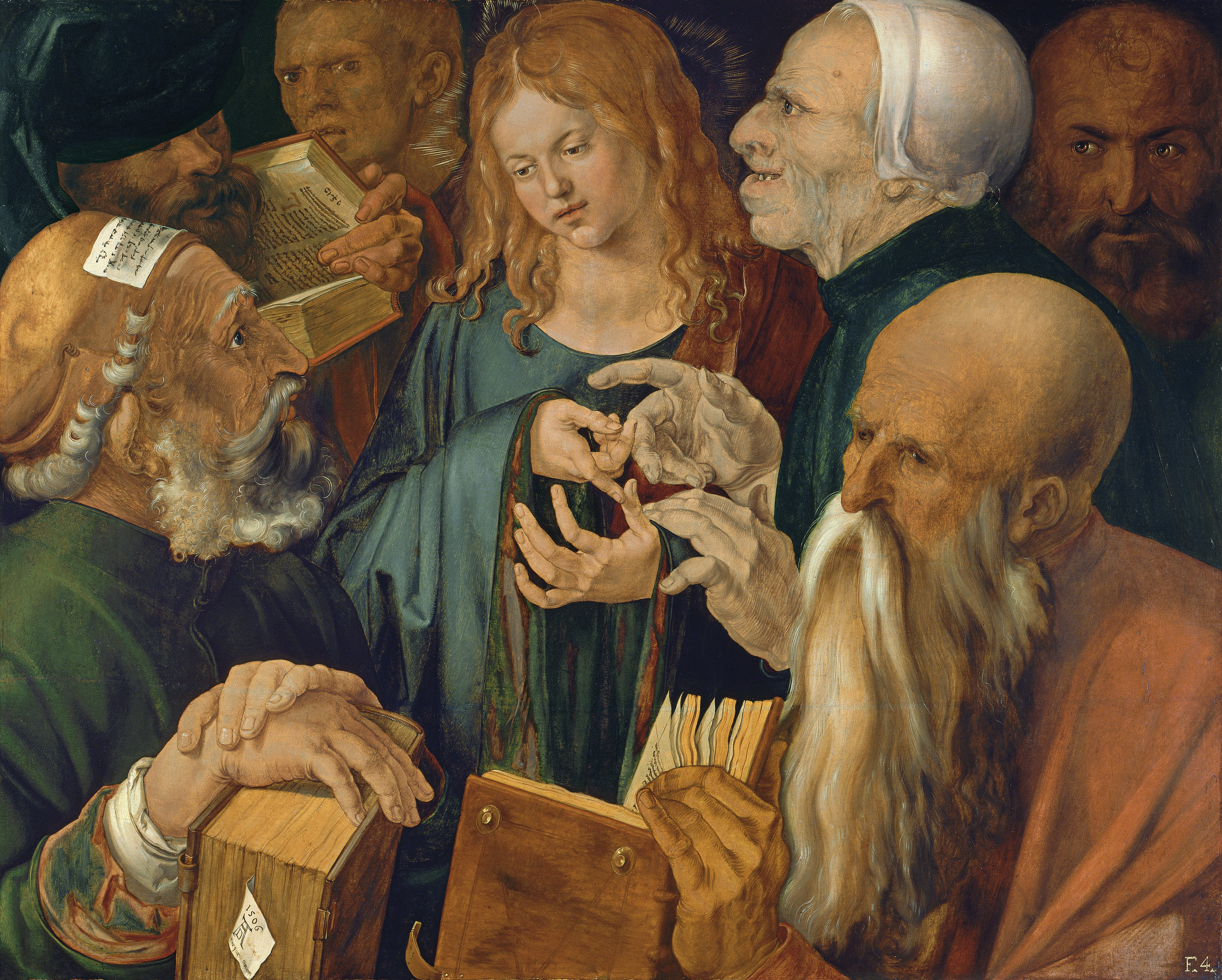
- Artist: Albrecht Dürer
- Year: 1506
- Type: painting
- Medium: oil on poplar panel
- Movement: German Renaissance
- Subject: Finding in the Temple
- Dimensions: 65 cm × 80 cm (26 in × 31 in)
- Location: Museo Thyssen-Bornemisza, Madrid (formerly Castagnola, Lugano)
- Accession: 134 (1934.38)

Christ among the Doctors is an oil painting by Albrecht Dürer, dating to 1506, now in the Museo Thyssen-Bornemisza, Madrid, Spain. The work belongs to the time of Dürer's sojourn in Italy, and was according to its inscription executed incidentally in five days while he was working on the Feast of the Rosary altarpiece in Venice. The work was influenced by Leonardo da Vinci and possibly based on the most probably earlier painting by Cima da Conegliano on the same theme.

== Conception ==
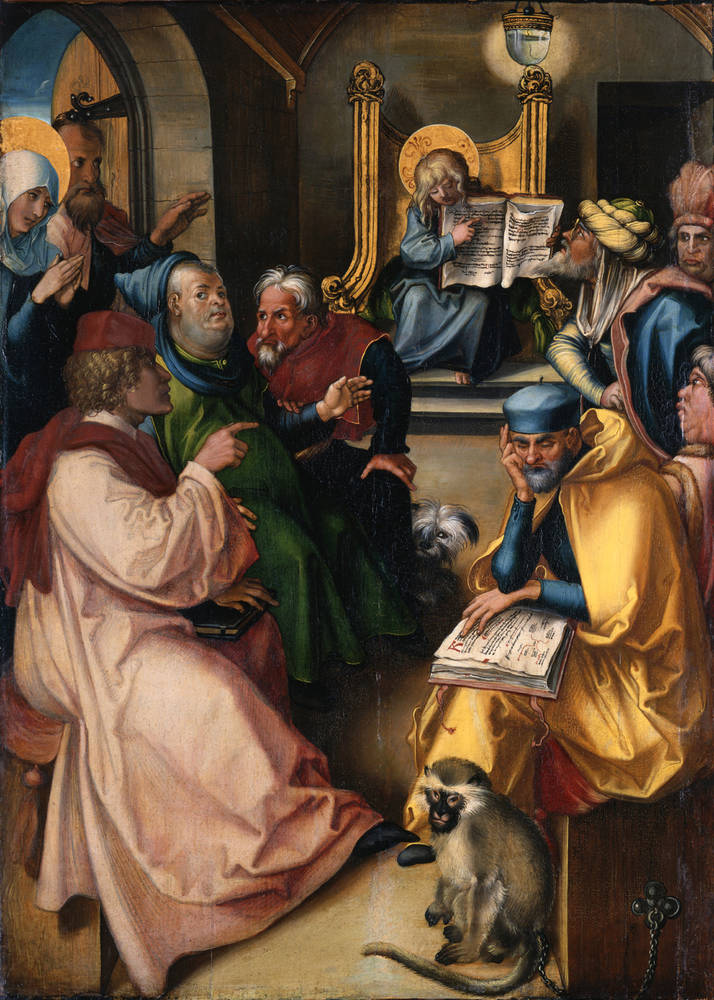
Dürer and workshop, Christ among the Doctors from the Seven Sorrows Polyptych, 1494–1497, Gemäldegalerie Dresden

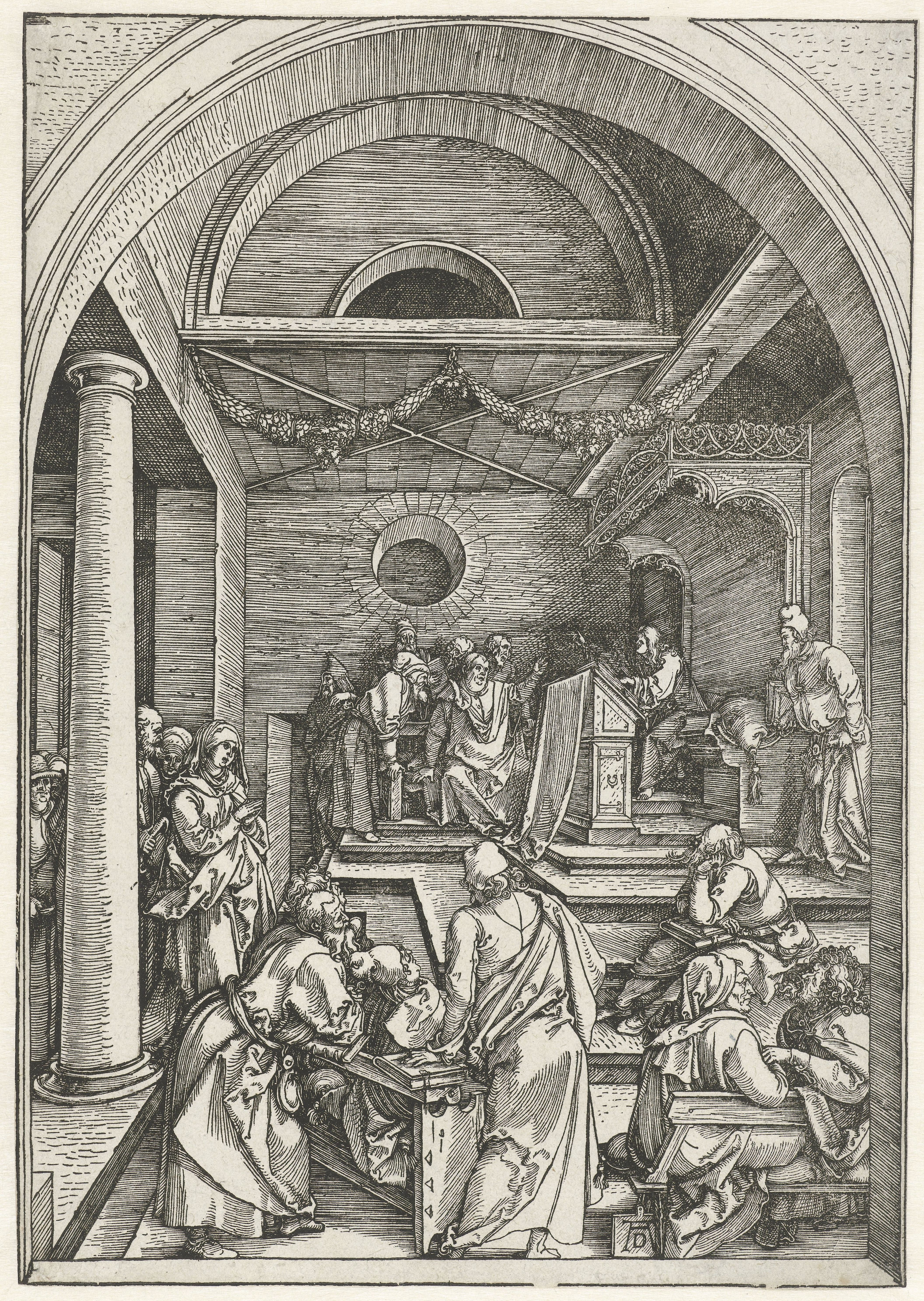
Christ among the Doctors from the Life of the Virgin, 1503/1504, woodcut print, 29.8 × 20.9 cm

The topic of the panel painting is the Finding in the Temple episode from Jesus's childhood, found in the Gospel of Luke (2:41–52). On an annual pilgrimage of the holy family to Jerusalem for Passover the twelve-year-old child got lost and was found again after three days in a temple debating with scholars executing His Father's business.

The subject had already been treated by Dürer in a panel of the Seven Sorrows Polyptych (1494–1497) executed by his workshop, and about ten years later in a woodcut of the Life of the Virgin series. However, in this work the German artist adopted a dense composition of half-figures, which was introduced by Andrea Mantegna in his The Presentation at the Temple (c. 1454, Berlin) and afterwards present in all Northern Italian schools including Venice. Though Dürer emphasised the focus on faces and hands (and books) even more.

=== Preparatory drawings ===
Not until his second journey to Italy Dürer made detailed studies after living models before he worked out a final composition for paintings and engravings alike. The first preparatory drawings originate in Venice, all in the same technique: dark ink drawn with a brush, highlighted with white tempera, on large sheets of Venetian blue dyed paper (carta azzurra). The blue color serves as a middle tone, a method he formerly applied in the Green Passion of 1504, and in drawings where he washed the background around the figures to obtain the same effect. Four preparatory drawings for the painting have survived, one of the infant's head (originally with the head of the lute playing angel for the Rosary panel on one sheet now cut) and a hand holding a book (both in the Albertina, Wien), a study of the hands counting off arguments, and a further drawing with two pairs of hands holding a book, of which only one Dürer finally incorporated into the picture (both in the Germanische Nationalmuseum, Nuremberg).

The four preparatory brush drawings on blue Venetian paper (1506)

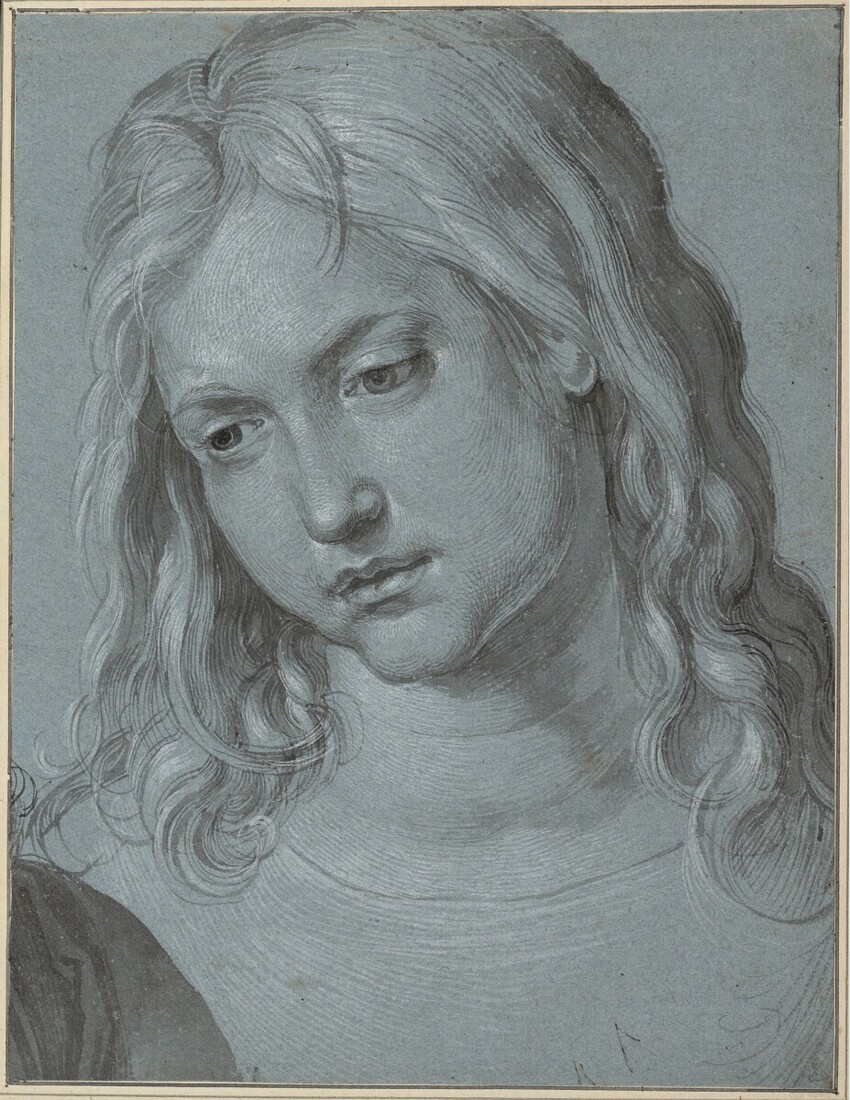
Head of the Infant Jesus, brush in grey and black, grey wash and highlights in tempera, 27.3 x 21 cm, Albertina (3106)

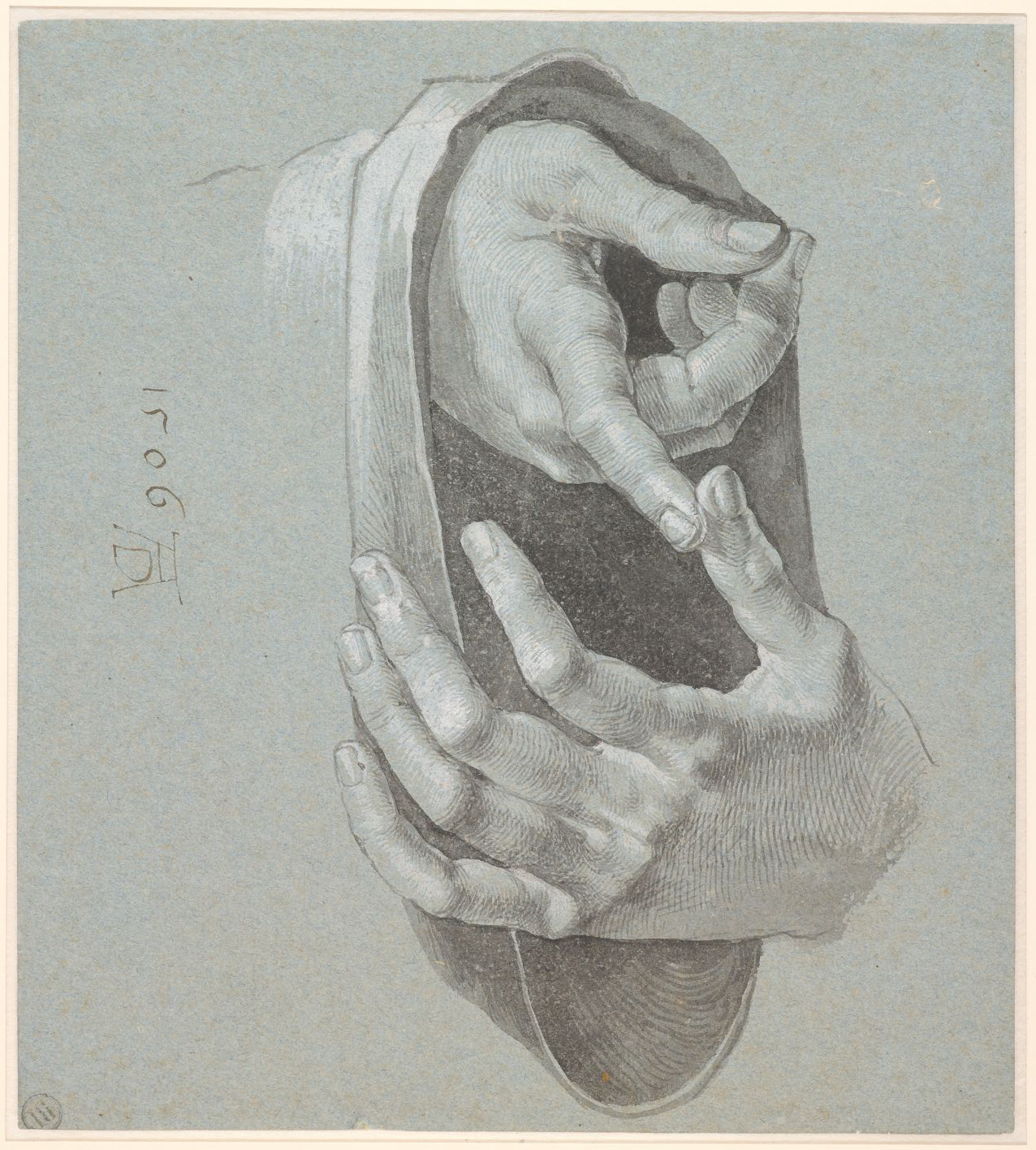
The Hands of the Twelve Year Old Infant Jesus, 20.7 × 18.5 cm, Germanisches Nationalmuseum, Nuremberg (Hz5482)

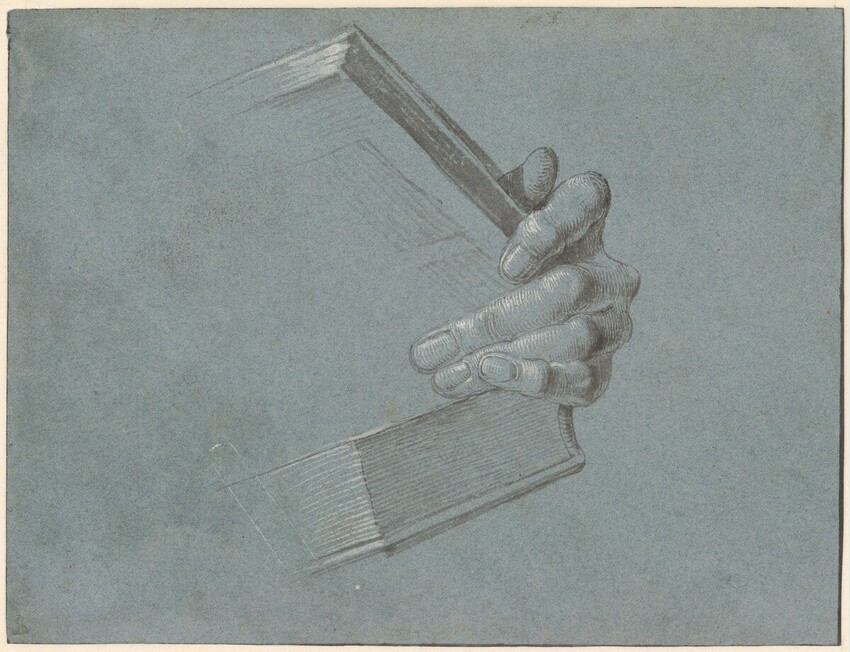
Hand with Book, 19,1 x 25,2 cm, Albertina (3103)

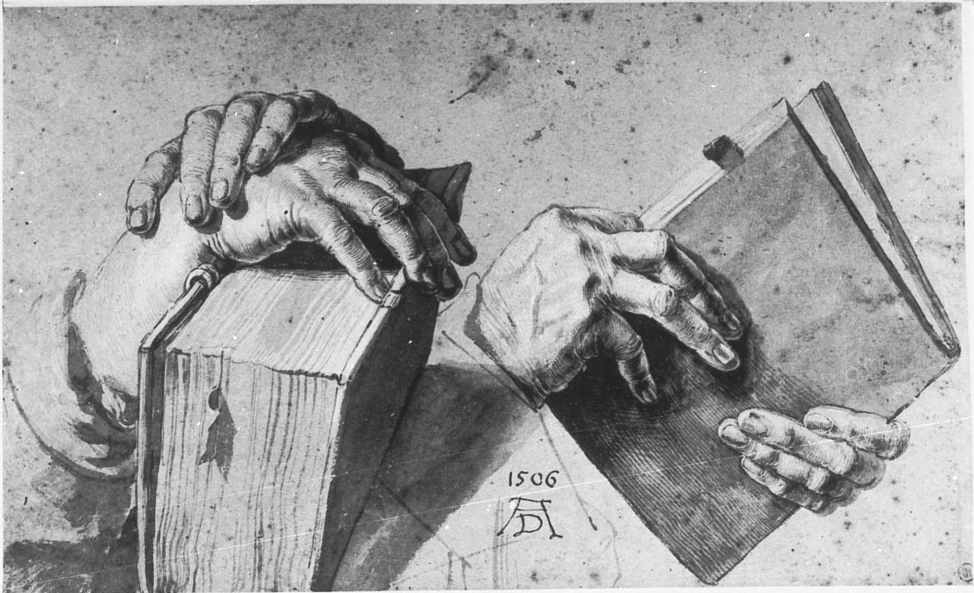
Two Pairs of Hands, 15.7 ×13.7 cm, Germanisches Nationalmuseum (Hz5481) black and white reproduction

=== The manner of painting ===
The panel of Jesus among the Doctors has a usual underdrawing grounded with egg-tempera, but covered by just a tenuous layer of oil paint. In fact, it is made "in an almost impromptu fashion, a thin coat of color being applied in broad and fluid strokes utterly different from Dürer's normally meticulous brushwork," as Erwin Panofsky described it. Christof Metzger, chief curator of the Graphic Collection at the Albertina in Vienna, stated that the panel wasn't even finished. Both pairs of hands in the center show still the outlines and hatches of the underdrawing and are hardly colored at all. The two heads in the background, the one in the upper right corner and the one who is looking out of the picture appear unfinished. Copies of the panel in Germany from around 1600 serve as evidence that the image was known north of the Alps, so that Dürer might have brought the painting back with him to Nuremberg.

The color palette is rather narrow, essentially two green tones for the cloaks of Jesus and two of the scholars, and a range of brown tones, from the darkened faces in the shadowy back, the book covers and the red cloak of the doctor on the right, the yellowish cap of the figure on the left, to the lighter skin colors and the broken white tones of hair, paper, and the chemise poking out at the wrist on the lower left corner and at the right hand of the doctor in profile; his cap finally is the largest bright part of the composition. The color range is expressively restrained compared to his interpretation on the altar-piece of the Seven Sorrows or the splendour of the Feast of the Rosary and the rich color conception of Italian Renaissance art.

=== "Made in five days" ===
As usual Dürer signed his work with his monogram and a date, displayed on an object within the scenery, like a little plaque (cartellino) or a piece of paper, a veristic device to invite the beholder into the picture space and hence into the depicted drama, instead of just signing an essentially two-dimensional composition of brush strokes on the surface of a piece of wood. The inscription in Jesus among the Doctors is written on a bookmarker that sticks out of the folio at the bottom of the picture on the left. It reads: 1506/A. D./Opus quinque dierum, "made in five days".

He produced the picture in this indeed rather short time to finish an oil painting, so that it was worth the inscription, probably due to the fact, that he prominently had to work on the Feast of the Rosary, commissioned by the German community in Venice residing at the Fondaco dei Tedeschi for their church (which brought him immediate fame that also radiated back to Nuremberg). And with the Virgin with the Siskin and several commissioned portraits there was plenty of work to be done. But the inscription cannot have taken into account the time of the conception, nor the preparatory studies nor the underdrawing. The "five days" may be also an ironic allusion to the "five month" he needed to finish the Rosary altarpiece, as he wrote in its inscription.

Opposing the two paintings reveals two kinds of work, done in different "modes of creation", the certainly more accomplished altarpiece was meticulously planned and executed, while the other was done swiftly following an instant inspiration, like a stroke of a genius. Dürer much later expressed this "unheard of" idea, as he wrote in a "strange speech" (seltsame Red) even for him, that some artist may sketch something in one day, that another won't achieve in a year, thus establishing a new "purely artistic" evaluation of an artwork, instead of the material needed and the amount of time spent. Unlike Alberti, whose writings he studied, Dürer became aware the "fundamental difference between the aesthetic value of the object represented in a work of art, and the aesthetic value of the work of art itself" (Panofsky), in which something ugly could be depicted beautifully by an able hand. "And this gift is miraculous" (Und diese Gab ist wunderlich), Dürer said. He was well aware of his exceptional talent already at an early age and it is surely the main motivation behind his trademark monogram, besides his copyright concerns related to his printed work. However he even signed his preparatory drawings with it, which would have otherwise been unnecessary.

== Imagery of the figures ==
The characters occupy the whole panel submerged in a dark background intensifying the tense atmosphere. Especially when compared to his former interpretations of the scene with their spacious compositions and traditional conception, the almost "nightmarish" (Panofsky) staging becomes evident. Here, the young Jesus is besieged by six philosophers surrounding him, arranged on at least four different planes, each with different skin texture, pose and expression, like character studies. They stand in stark contrast to the entirely soft and restraint appearance of the innocent child. Even his halo is not displayed as a golden disc, instead delicate golden lines emanate from his head in form of a faceted cross, like he was illuminated by divine light. So he stands steadfast in the central axis of the picture contemplating his arguments and counting them off on his fingers, while the doctors keep to the books in their hands ready to cite from them.

Each of the doctors reacts differently to the words of Jesus. The one on the upper left is depicted with the head over his eyes literally blind to the new thoughts, stubbornly buried into the scripture. The man on the lower left with a cartouche on his beret, a customary depiction of the Pharisees, on the contrary has closed his book and begins to pay attention trying to fathom the Child's arguments. The oldest of the philosophers seen in profile on the right next to Jesus refutes his thoughts and even gets physical with his imposing hands that interrupt the child's argumentative gesture. These two pairs of hands form a kind of ornament in the center of the picture (in fact, slightly off), summarizing the panel's theme in an abstract way. Gesturing hands were a characteristic Italian motif for the representation of scholars and teachers.

The head of the "wicked old scholar" shown in profile "can hardly be imagined without some knowledge" of the caricature drawings by Leonardo da Vinci. The way he displayed the discussion and the contrasting depiction of "extreme beauty and extreme ugliness" Dürer may as well have been following Leonardo's instructions in his Trattato della Pintura. In fact, the treatise was known in Venice, and probably to Dürer, too. And although Leonardo was in Milan at the time, Dürer went to Florence for a short period and probably visited Leonardo's workshop, where his apprentices were still busy, so he could have seen into his work.

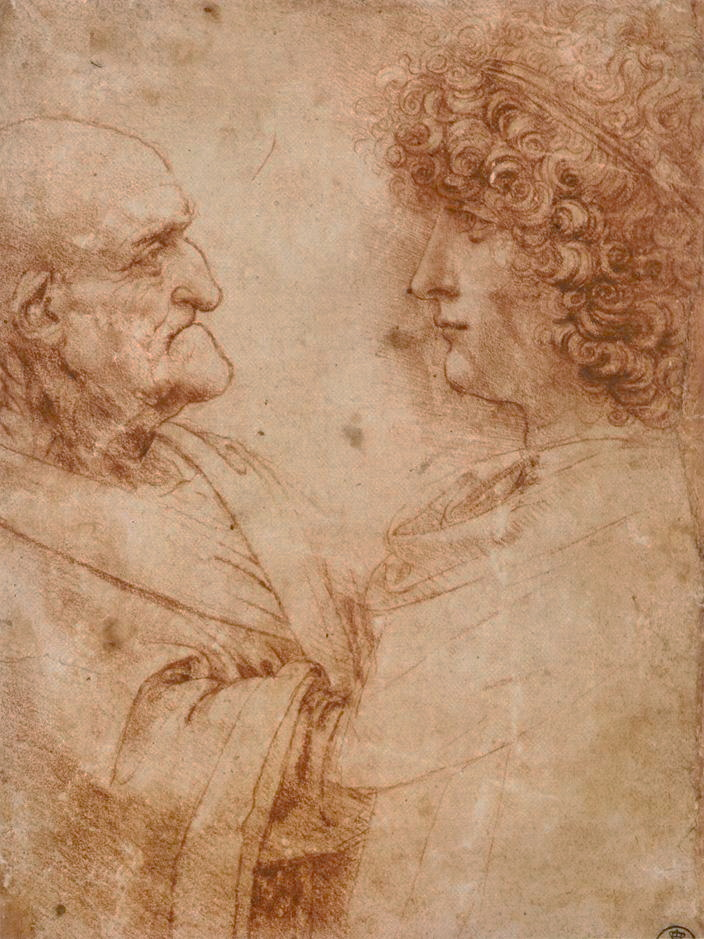
Leonardo da Vinci, Heads of an Old Man and a Youth, c. 1495, red chalk on paper, Uffizi, Florence

The display of the grotesque was seen everywhere in northern medieval culture, from the gargoyles and capitals of the great cathedrals to the tableaux vivants, the open-air mystery plays and comedic theatre with their amateur actors grimacing and distorting their bodies, that inspired artists to adopt them primarily for miniatures in illuminated texts. But they didn't appear to necessarily have a moral inclination, instead they were a lively expression of the variety of God's creation. This tradition was carried on by Dürer's contemporaries, prominently by his colleague Hieronymus Bosch or in the countless farces of Hans Sachs. And it is known through his letters, that Dürer could be vulgar himself. Bialostocki concluded: "When achieving some incidental glimpses of Leonardo's bizarre inventions, northern artists saw in them only what they wished to see: their own tradition. And this northern tradition is dominant in the physiognomical repertoire of Dürer's [Lugano] picture."

Dürer himself adopted some crucial ideas of the Italian Renaissance aesthetic but did not orient his work wholeheartedly towards it either. He came to understand art as a science, particularly owed to Leonardo, but his Jesus among the Doctors has no part in this, and therefore is often seen as "Gothic" still. The Child's goodness Dürer expresses through its gratefulness, but he refused the Italian concept of ideal beauty derived from the antique. He was convinced that beauty was manyfold and relative to the individual eye, only God could know absolute beauty. Instead he emphasised the moral imacculacy of the young Jesus with the immediate juxtaposition of the old and ugly. And maybe he felt confirmed by Leonardo in this matter.

== The tradition of the composition ==
=== Mantegna and Bellini ===
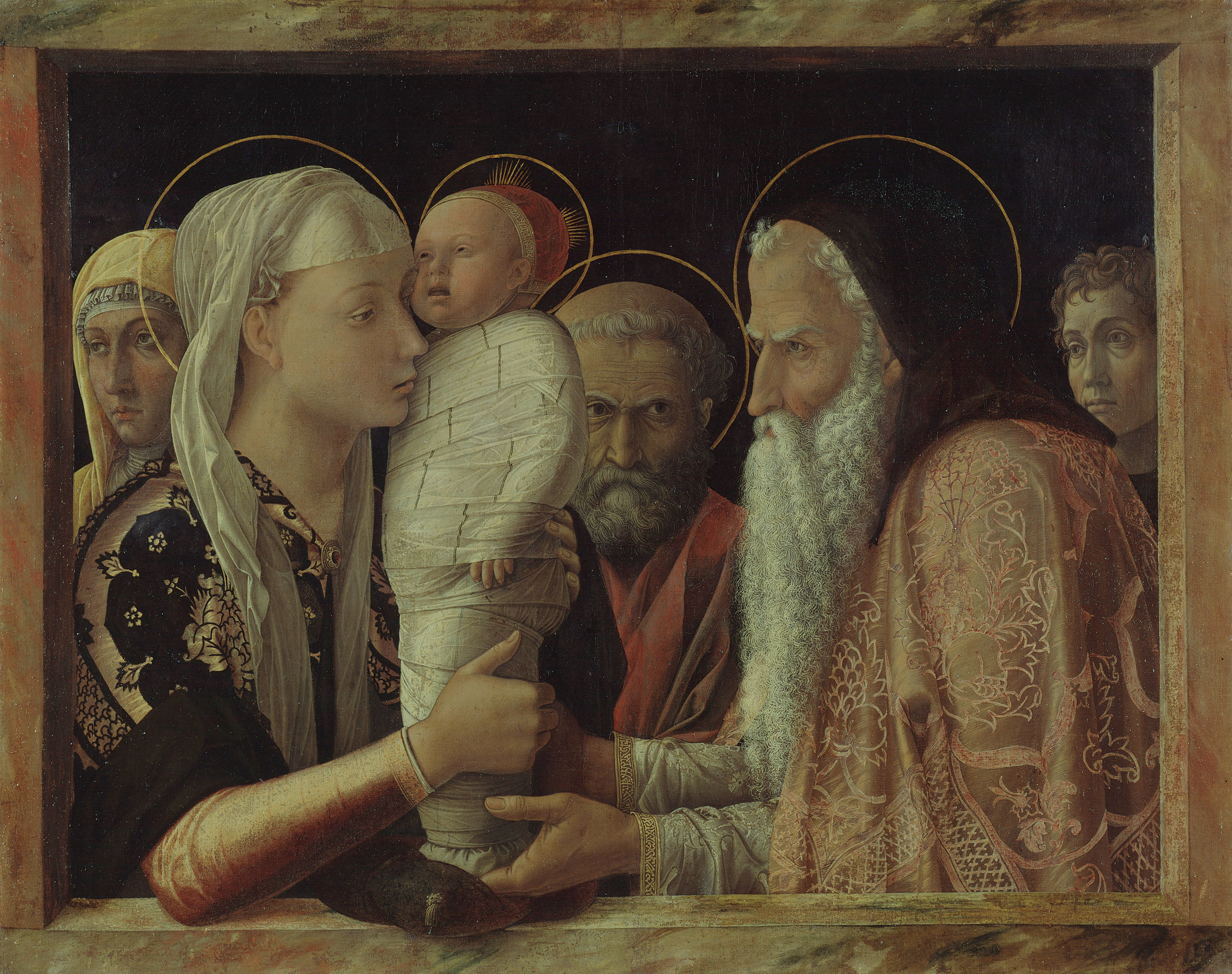
Andrea Mantegna - The Presentation at the Temple, c. 1455, tempera, Gemäldegalerie, Berlin

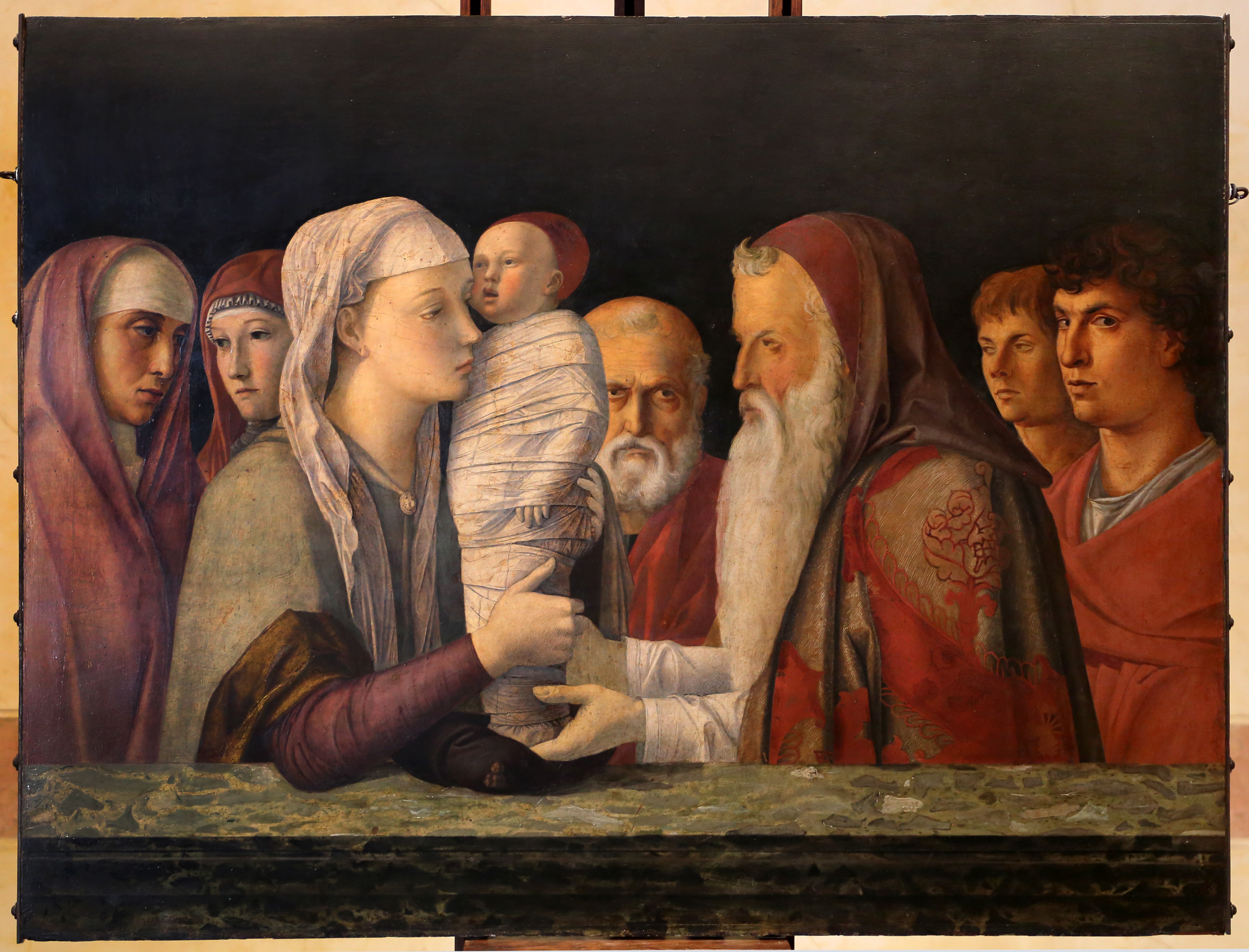
Giovanni Bellini, Presentation at the Temple, c. 1469, tempera on panel, Fondazione Querini Stampalia, Venice

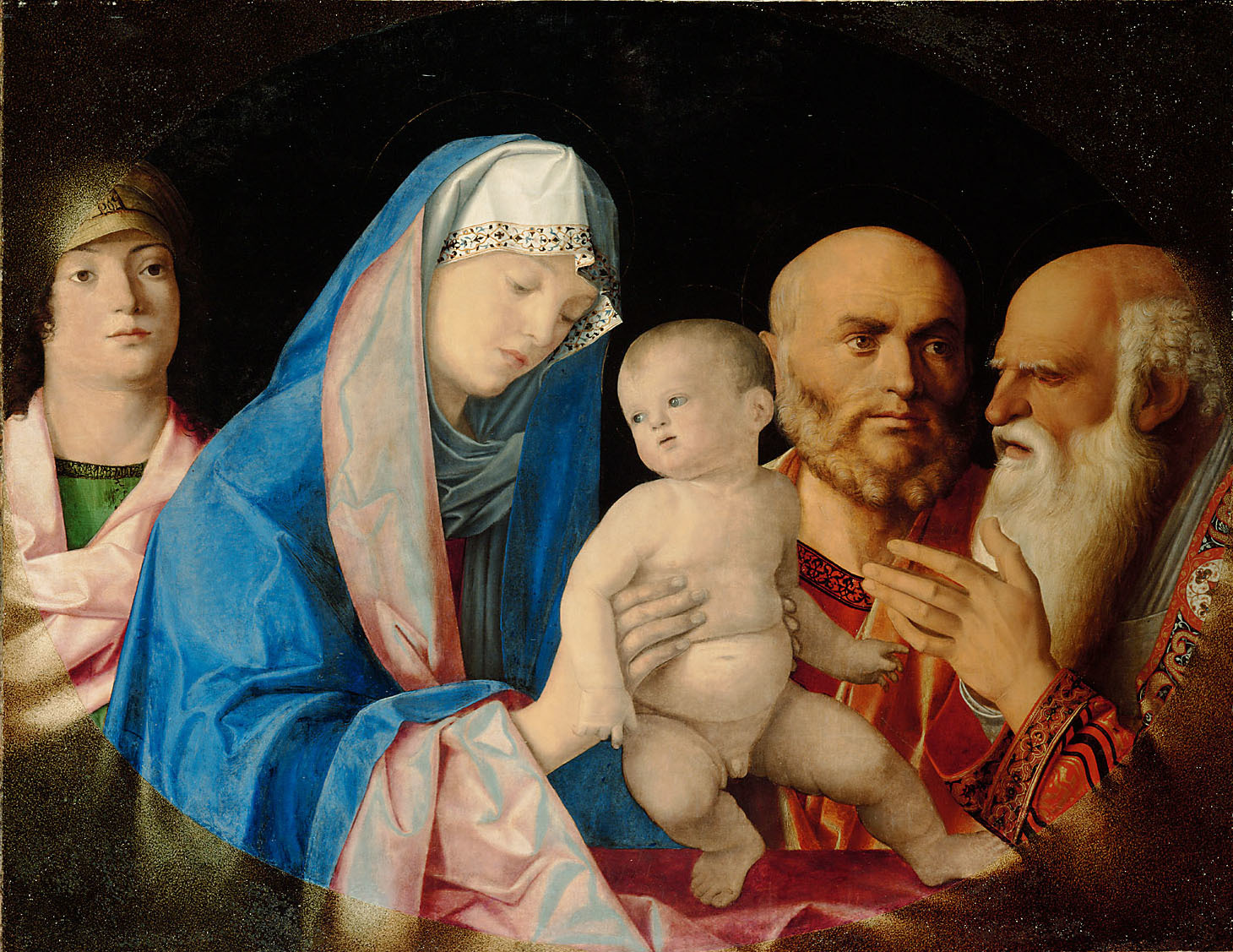
Giovanni Bellini, Homage to Christ in the Temple, c. 1490–1500, Kunsthistorisches Museum Wien

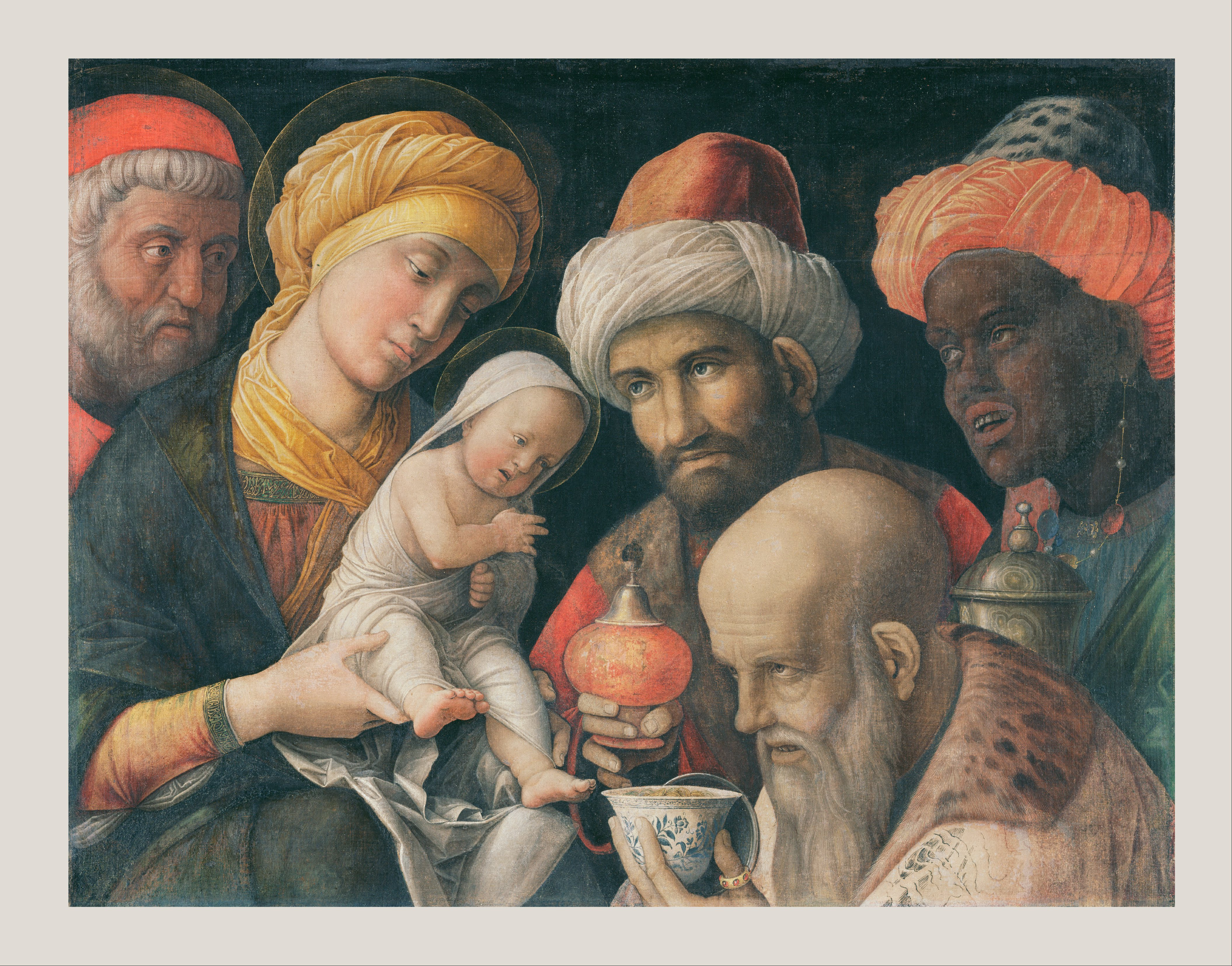
Andrea Mantegna, Adoration of the Magi, c. 1495–1505, tempera on canvas, 48.6 x 65.6 cm, Getty Center, Los Angeles

The conception of a composition with several half-figures (maximal height) in a neutral dark space was introduced by Andrea Mantegna, but may be traced back to reliefs by Donatello. There are no additions like furniture or architecture that would constitute a space, only the clothes of the figures and accessoires on them or held in their hands transmit meaning, but the dramatic aspect of the theme is exclusively displayed by facial expression, gesture and the spacial relation between the figures.

Mantegna probably painted The Presentation at the Temple around 1455, when he married the sister of Giovanni Bellini, or on the occasion of the birth of their first child. The scene's protagonists are Mary, the Infant Jesus, Joseph (slightly subordinated in the center) and Simeon, who is about to recognise the Messiah. The two added figures are sometimes considered to be portraits of Mantegna himself and his wife (since the woman is to young to be the 84-year-old Hannah of the story, who propagates the news). Decades later Mantegna's brother-in-law painted a version of Presentation at the Temple traced from the original. Expanded with two more figures it was often similarly considered a Bellini family portrait (including Mantegna).

Mantegna died in Mantua in 1506, and there are no sources that would confirm Dürer ever met him personally, but through Bellini he learned about his work. In 1494 Dürer copied at least two engravings by Mantegna, Battle of the Sea Gods and Bacchanal with Silenus.

Dürer became acquainted with Bellini on his (disputed) first stay in Venice in the mid-1490s. They very much respected each other. Bellini asked Dürer to paint a piece for him, and it was considered that Dürer maybe gave the Christ among the Doctors to him. Dürer wrote to his humanist friend Willibald Pirckheimer in Nuremberg that Bellini was "old, and he is still the best" ("Er ist sehr alt und ist noch, der best in Gemäl"). At the time Dürer arrived in Venice in the summer of 1505, Bellini's San Zaccaria Altarpiece was erected and surely was an event talked about not only in artists circles. Dürer paid homage to him by incorporating the figure of the single lute-playing angel sitting in front of Mary's throne into his Feast of the Rosary. The free interpretation of Bellini's original figure shows how Dürer used to respond autonomously to inspirational ideas of others. (The angel's head Dürer had prepared with a study drawn on the same sheet of Venetian paper as the head of the young Christ, now separated.)

The half-figure on the far right side of Christ Among the Doctors is said to be perhaps a citation of Giovanni Bellini, but it is more likely that the figure was copied from a painting by Mantegna. In his Adoration of the Magi from around 1500, conceived too as a picture-filling sacra conversazione, the figure is also placed in the lower right corner. Dürer used this figure several times, in the Feast of the Rosary he was also working on at the time, the head appears somewhat hidden at the far left side of the panel.

Both Presentation panels of Mantegna and Bellini have all personage and the beholder on almost equal height, whereas Dürer had tilted the ground plane resulting in a perspectival view from slightly above seemingly to gain depth of space and rectify the overcrowded scene. But the composition is "conceived flatly, and the spatial relations between the figures are so much neglected that we must interpret this lack of three-dimensionality as intentional." Maybe this was caused by the short time he spend on it, or he purposefully aimed for a contrasting statement against the Venetian sense for calmness and harmonic composition, as well as his own Feast of the Rosary. Without fail he emphasised the drama in his own Northern way.

=== Cima da Conegliano and Bernardino Luini ===
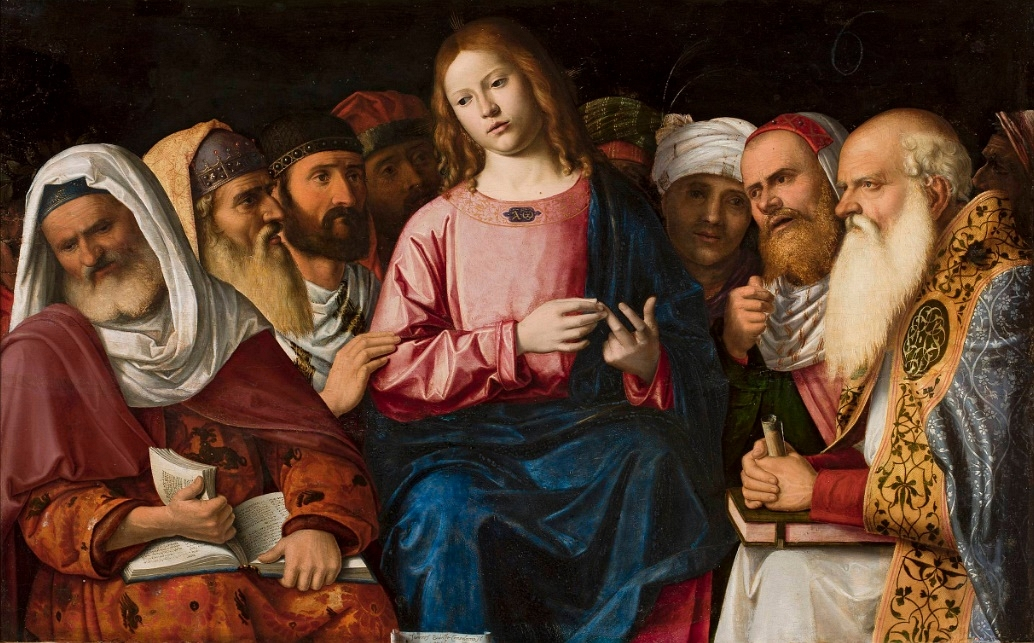
Cima da Conegliano, Christ among the Scholars, c. 1504, tempera on panel, 54.5 x 84.4 cm, National Museum in Warsaw

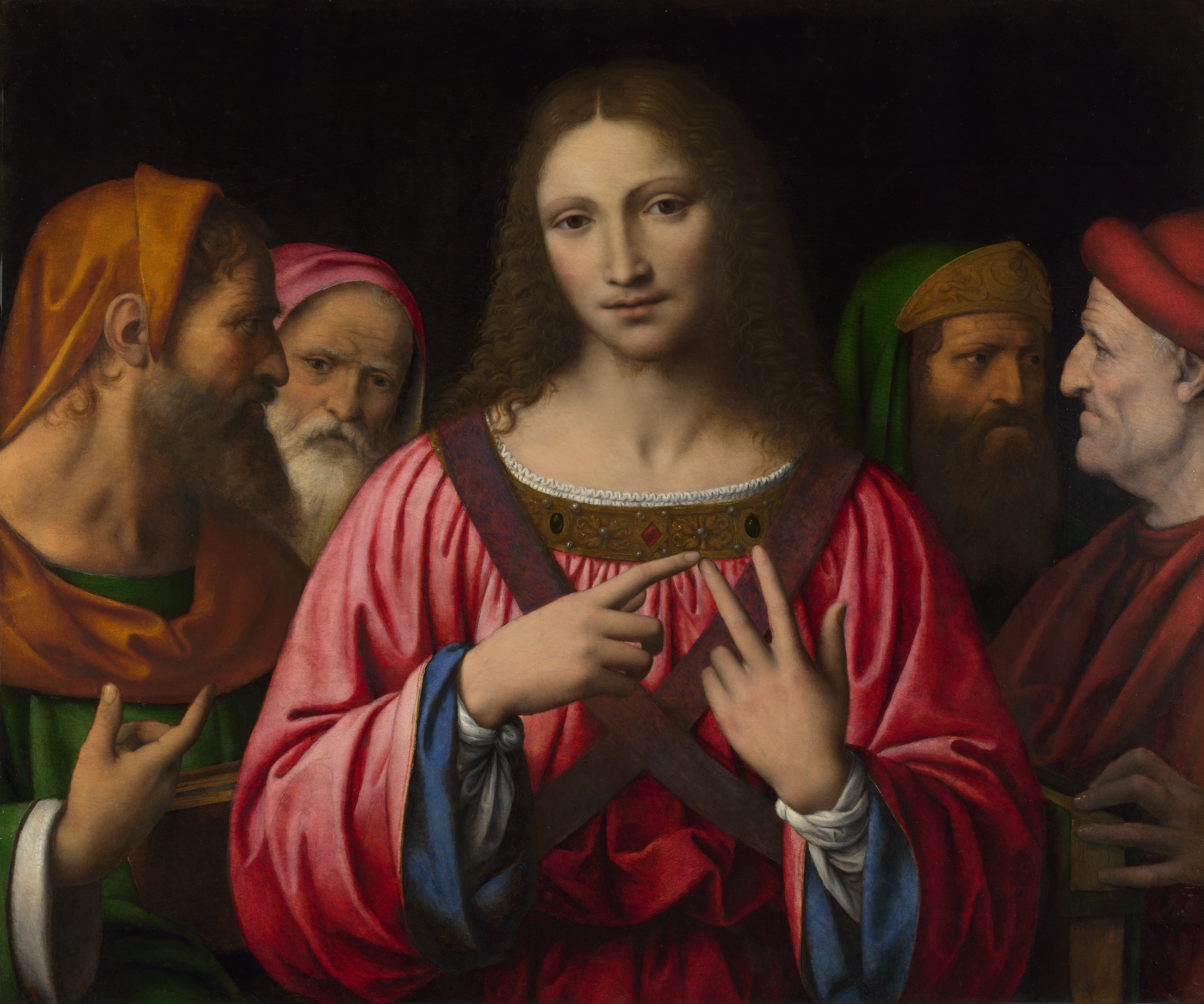
Bernardino Luini, Christ among the Doctors, c.1515–30, National Gallery, London

The panel of Christ among the Doctors by Cima da Conegliano is assessed to have preceded Dürer's painting about a year or two. Cima followed the local tradition established by Mantegna and Bellini. About thirty copies and variations of their composition alone are known. And the conception with half-figures with a neutral background lend itself to other biblical episodes and sacred conversations produced in northern Italy.

Cima took the scene out of its narrative context and created an autonomous symbolic composition. The overriding theme is the divine knowledge through Christ as Alpha and Omega. He left Mary and Joseph out of the picture and concentrated the image on the theological debate, emphasised by the traditional motif of hands enumerating points on the fingers (computus digitalis). The gesture is depicted slightly off center to the right, the right hand reaching for the left, just like in the Dürer painting. But here it forms a diagonal with Christ's head, which reruns in parallels elegantly through the whole composition. And the personage, whose diversity is illustrated by their clothes, form a half-circle around the Christ Child, already generating a deeper space than the panels by Mantegna and Bellini. Still further similarities with Dürer's panel can be seen on the left side of Cima's painting, where a scholar tries to interrupt Jesus by touching him at his arm, while the doctor on the extreme left seems to have understood the child and begins to rip of the pages from his folio. Since Cima's "classical composition could not have been produced as an echo of Dürer's "Gothic" unrest," it seems more likely that Dürer developed his composition from Cima's, than the other way around.

The theme of Jesus among the Doctors became popular in Italy in the 16th century. In 1504 Isabella d'Este commissioned Leonardo to paint the Infant Jesus, but nothing came of that. The later painting by Bernardino Luini was assumed to have been inspired by or even copied from an assumed lost composition by Leonardo. But this dependency is rejected and the lost work by Leonardo dismissed, despite some resemblance particularly of the young Jesus with Leonardo's style. Apart from that, Luni's work appears more like a devotional image in a traditional way. Christ stands in the foreground, faces the beholder and addresses him, leaving the doctors behind him merely as staffage, the conflict muted.

== See also ==
- List of paintings by Albrecht Dürer

== Sources ==
- Moritz Thausing (1882). Albrecht Dürer. London: J. Murray. p. 350.
- William Martin Conway, ed. (1889). The Writings of Albrecht Dürer (with Transcripts from the British Museum Manuscripts and Notes upon Them by Lina Eckstein). New York: Philosophical Library.
- Konrad von Lange; Franz Louis Fuhse, eds. (1893). Dürers schriftlicher Nachlass auf Grund der Originalhandschriften und theilweise neu entdeckter alter Abschriften (in German). Halle a. S.: Max Niemeyer.
- Heinrich Wölfflin (1905). Die Kunst Albrecht Dürers. Munich: F. Bruckmann. p. 133.
- Erwin Panofsky (1955) [1943]. The Life and Art of Albrecht Dürer (PDF) (1971 ed.). Princeton, NJ: Princeton University Press. ISBN 0-691-00303-3.
- Jan Bialostocki (1959). ""Opus Quinque Dierum": Dürer's 'Christ among the Doctors' and Its Sources". Journal of the Warburg and Courtauld Institutes. 22 (1/2). London: The Warburg Institute: 17–34.
- Albrecht Dürer 1471–1971 (Exhibition held at the Germanische Nationalmuseum Nürnberg) (in German). Munich: Prestel. 1971. ISBN 3791300040.
- Fedja Anzelewsky (1980). "Italien 1505–1507". Dürer – Werk und Wirkung (in German). Stuttgart: Electa/Klett-Cotta. pp. 132–138. ISBN 3-88448-007-3.
- Rainer Schoch (1986). "Catalogue 124: Albrecht Dürer, The Hands of the Twelve-Year-Old Child". In Metropolitan Museum of Art, New York; Germanisches Nationalmuseum Nuremberg (eds.). Gothic and Renaissance Art in Nuremberg. New York and Munich: Metropolitan Museum of Art and Prestel. pp. 297f. ISBN 0-87099-466-2.
- David Alan Brown; Sylvia Ferino-Pagden (2006). National Gallery of Art, Washington; Kunsthistorisches Museum Wien (eds.). Bellini, Giorgione, Tizian and the Renaissance of Venetian Painting. Princeton, NJ: Yale University Press. pp. 112–115. ISBN 978-0-300-11677-9.
- Christof Metzger (2019). "Jesus unter den Schriftgelehrten". In Christof Metzger (ed.). Albrecht Dürer (in German). Vienna and Munich: Albertina and Prestel. ISBN 978-3-7913-5930-4. (An English edition was published.)
- Neville Rowley (2019). "Als Bellini Mantegna abpauste. Zwei Versionen der Darbringung im Tempel". In Caroline Campbell; Dagmar Korbacher; Neville Rowley; Sarah Vowles (eds.). Mantegna & Bellini. Meister der Renaissance (in German). London, Berlin, München: National Gallery of Art, Gemäldegalerie, Staatliche Museen zu Berlin, Hirmer. pp. 140–147. (An English edition was published.) A variation of the text in German and English published in the museum's online catalogue.
