= Staatliche Graphische Sammlung München =

Coordinates: 48°08′40″N 11°34′00″E

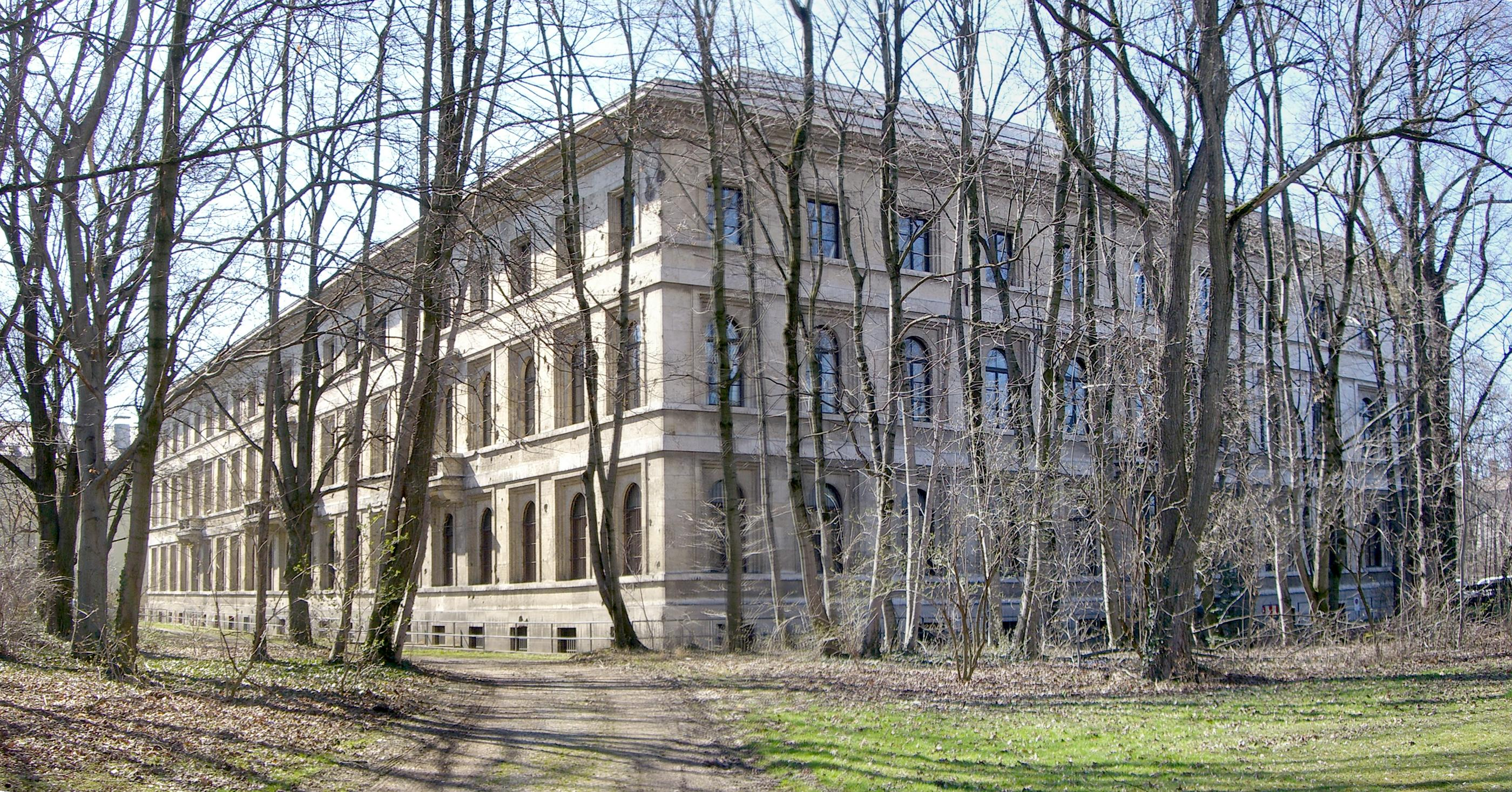
Haus der Kulturinstitute

The Staatliche Graphische Sammlung in Munich (München), Germany, is a large collection of drawings, prints and engravings. It contains 400,000 sheets starting from the 15th century from various artists around the world. Along with Kupferstichkabinett Berlin and Kupferstichkabinett Dresden, it is the most important collection of its kind in Germany. It is owned by the government of Bavaria and located within the Kunstareal, a museum quarter in the city centre of Munich.

== History ==
Its history dates back to 1758 Charles Theodore, Elector of Bavaria (Carl Theodor von der Pfalz) in the Mannheim Palace with his Kupferstich- und Zeichnungskabinett. In 1794, it was brought to Munich because of French troops. In 1839, parts of the collection were first publicly displayed in the Kupferstich-Kabinett of Alte Pinakothek. In 1874, it became an independent and government-owned museum. In 1905, it was renamed to Königliche Graphische Sammlung. In 1917, the inventory was moved to Neue Pinakothek until 1944. In 1949, it was renamed to Staatliche Graphische Sammlung and relocated to Münchner Haus der Kulturinstitute. In 2002, the Graphische Sammlung has own exhibition areas in the Pinakothek der Moderne for temporary exhibitions (Sonderausstellungen).

== Inventory ==
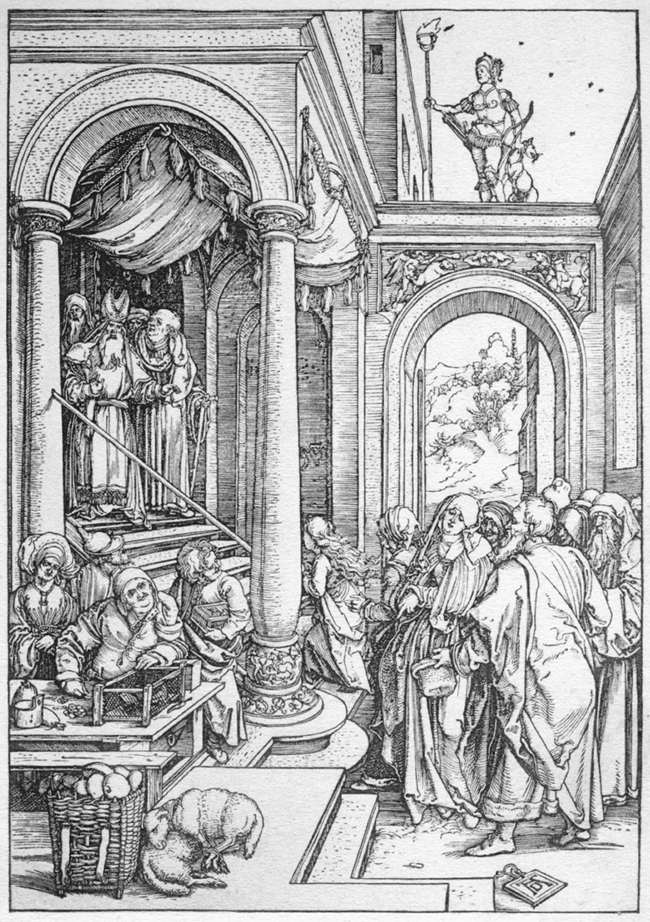
Albrecht Dürer - Life of the Virgin

The Graphische Sammlung owns 350,000 prints and 45,000 drawings, including works by the Asam brothers, Georg Baselitz, Max Beckmann, Joseph Beuys, Salvador Dalí, Otto Dix, Albrecht Dürer, Max Ernst, Anselm Feuerbach, Caspar David Friedrich, Vincent van Gogh, El Greco, Matthias Grünewald, Olaf Gulbransson, Ignaz Günther, Jörg Immendorff, Wassily Kandinsky, Paul Klee, Gustav Klimt, Käthe Kollwitz, Roy Lichtenstein, Max Liebermann, René Magritte, Édouard Manet, Andrea Mantegna, Franz Marc, Henri Matisse, Pius Ferdinand Messerschmitt, Michelangelo, Edvard Munch, Emil Nolde, Albert Oehlen, Claes Oldenburg, Pablo Picasso, Rembrandt, Peter Paul Rubens, Carl Spitzweg, Leonardo da Vinci, and Andy Warhol.

== See also ==
- Pinakothek der Moderne § Collection of works on paper
- List of museums in Germany

== Sources ==
The initial version of this article is based upon the German language edition of Wikipedia at de:Staatliche Graphische Sammlung München, 2010-06-01.
