= Presentation at the Temple (Fra Angelico) =

Painting by Fra Angelico

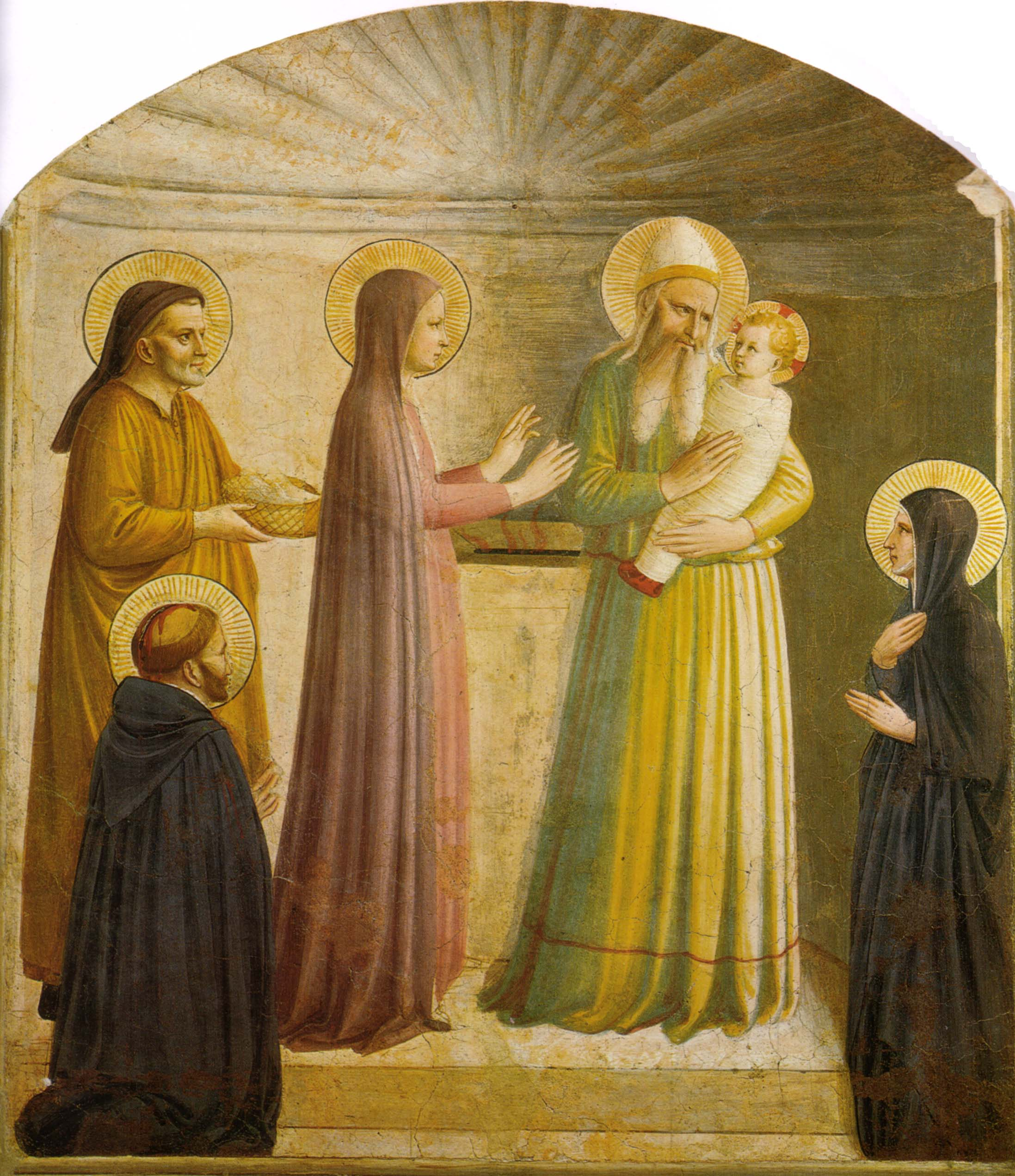
Presentation of Jesus at the Temple by Fra Angelico

Presentazione di Gesù al Tempio is a fresco by Fra Angelico made for the then Dominican Convent of Saint Mark in Florence, Italy. It depicts the dedication of Jesus in the Temple in Jerusalem as the first-born son of His family, as related in the Gospel of St. Luke, 2:23–24. Saint Joseph carries a basket containing two doves as Mary witnesses the Infant Jesus being held by Simeon. This event, the fourth Joyful Mystery of the Rosary, a devotion particularly promoted by the Dominicans, is depicted as being anachronistically witnessed by the Dominican saints Peter of Verona (recognizable by the bloody gash on his head) and Blessed Villana de' Botti.

This is one of a limited number of paintings whose composition and brightness suggest that the Dominican friar Fra Angelico was involved in their creation; however, some of the painting indicated that less skilled hands also assisted. The painting dates from 1450 to 1452 when Angelico was the Prior of San Domenico in Fiesole. Today the work can be seen at the National Museum of San Marco in Florence.
