= Life of the Virgin (Dürer) =

Woodcut series by Albrecht Dürer

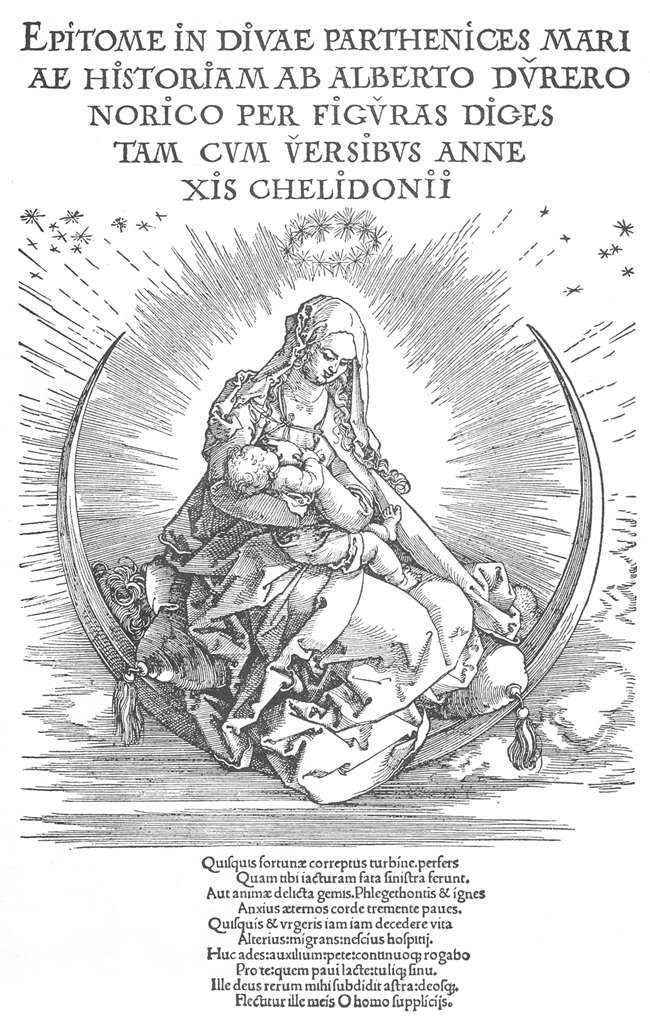
Frontispiece

Life of the Virgin is a series of nineteen woodcuts plus a frontispiece, published in book form. It was begun by Albrecht Dürer just after 1500 and only completed 1510-1511. One of the best surviving sets is now in the Staatliche Graphische Sammlung München.

It was begun whilst he was still halfway through work on his Great Passion series. Only sixteen of the plates were complete by 1504, with final completion further delayed by the artist's second stay in Venice from 1504 to 1505.

== Gallery ==
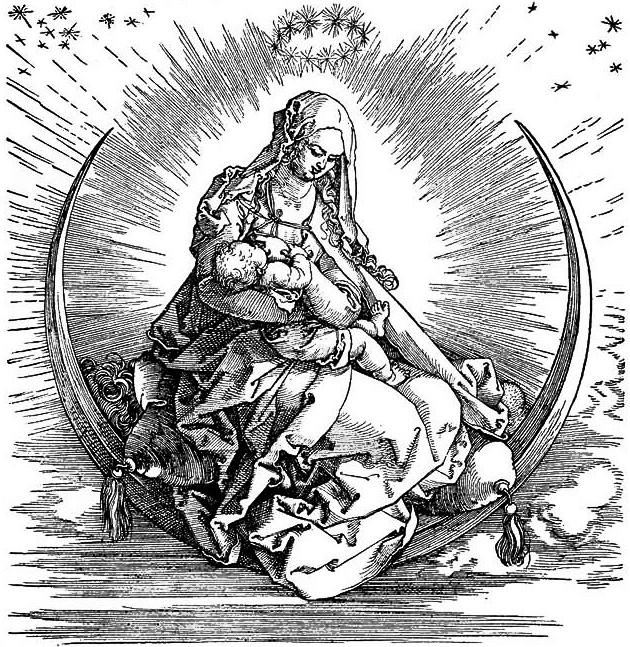
Frontispiece (detail; 1510–1511)

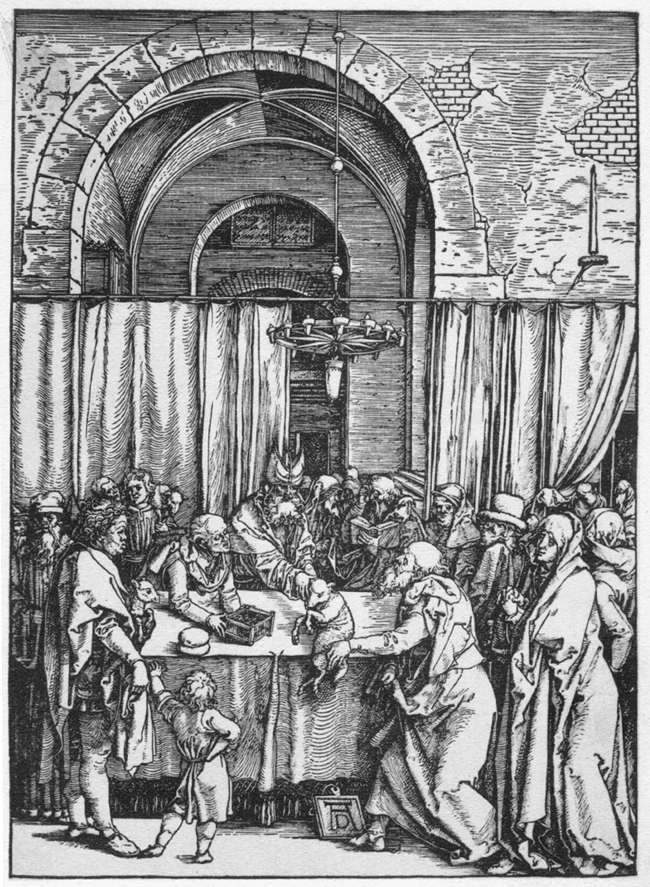
Joachim Driven from the Temple (1504)

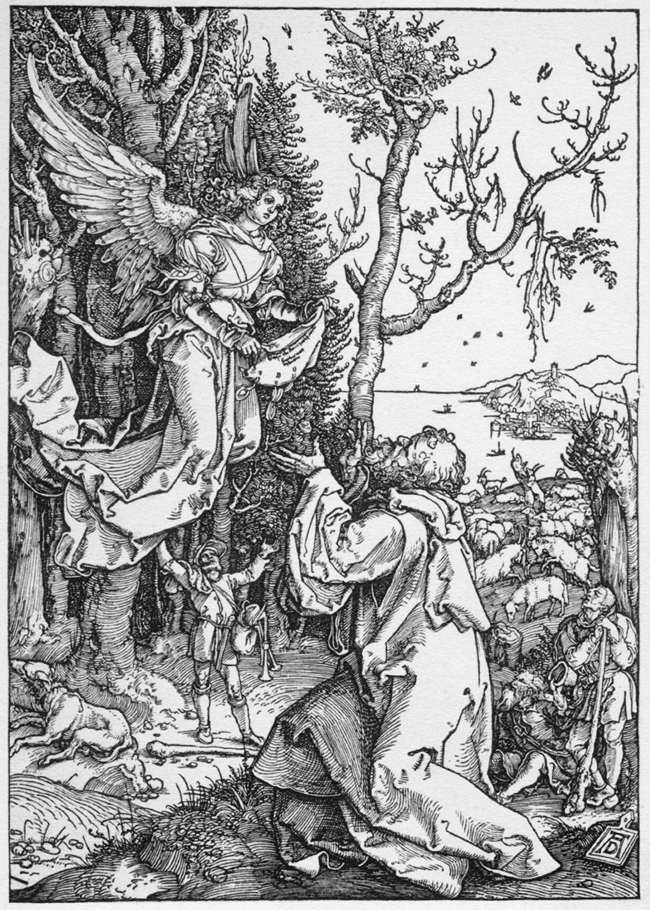
The Angel Appears to Joachim (1505)

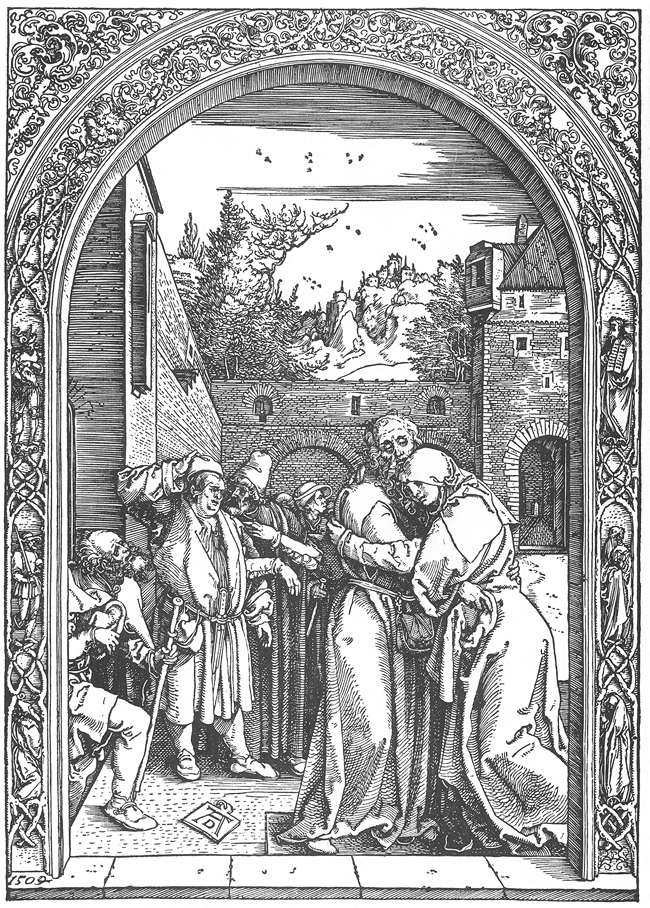
Meeting at the Golden Gate (1504)

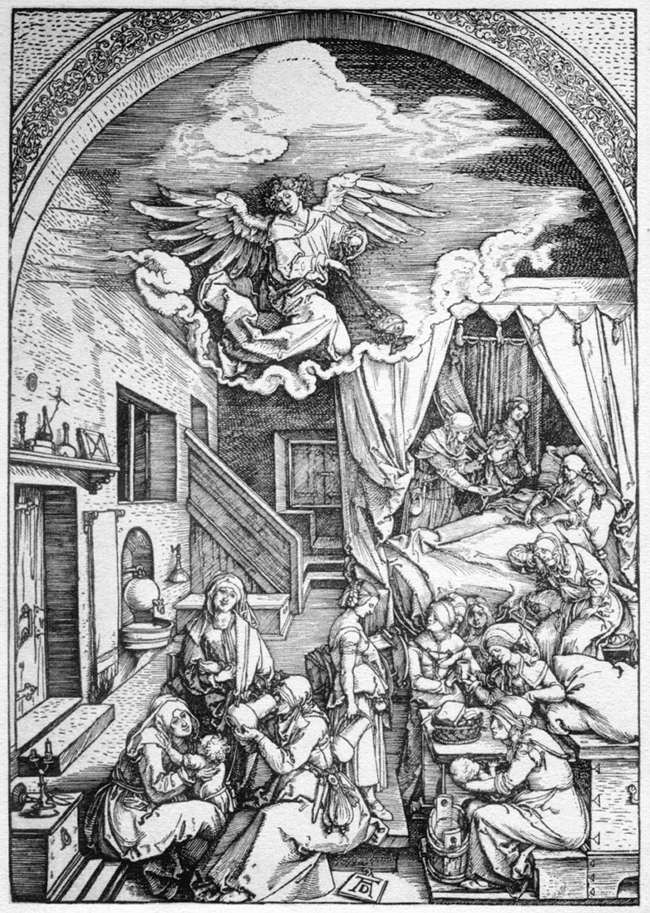
Birth of the Virgin (1503)

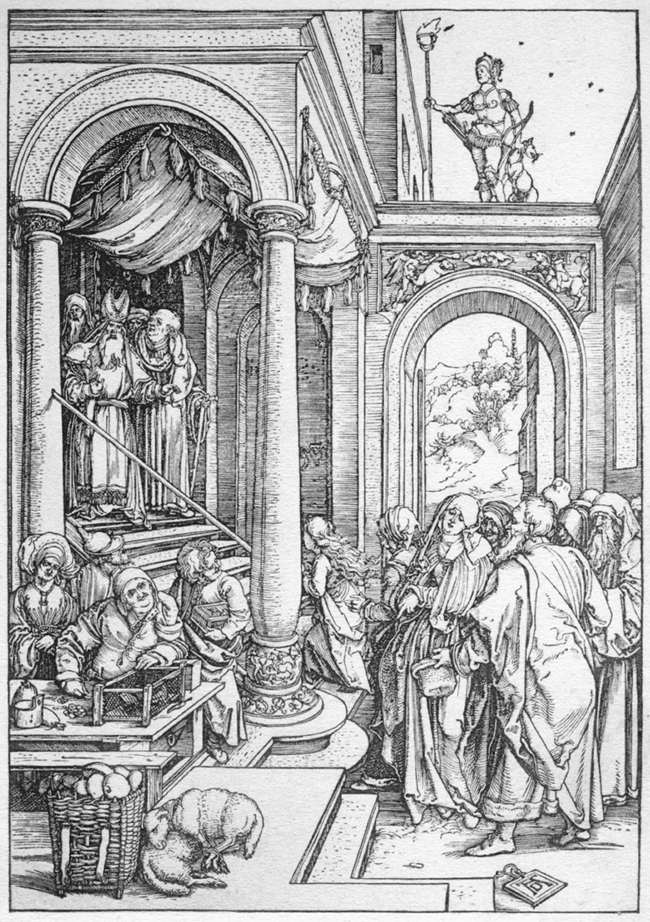
Presentation of Mary in the Temple (1504-1505)

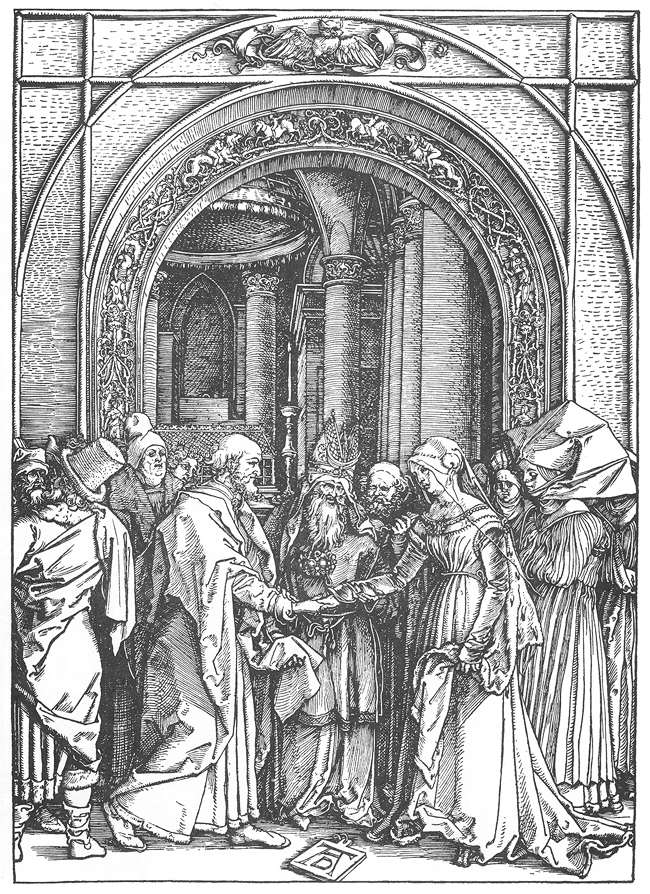
Marriage of the Virgin (around 1504)

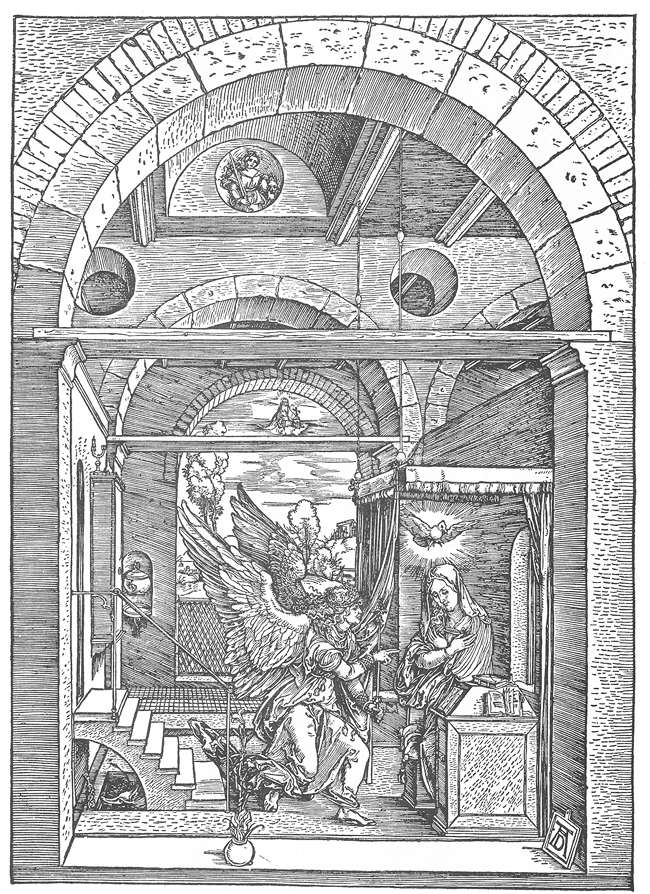
Annunciation (1500-1502)

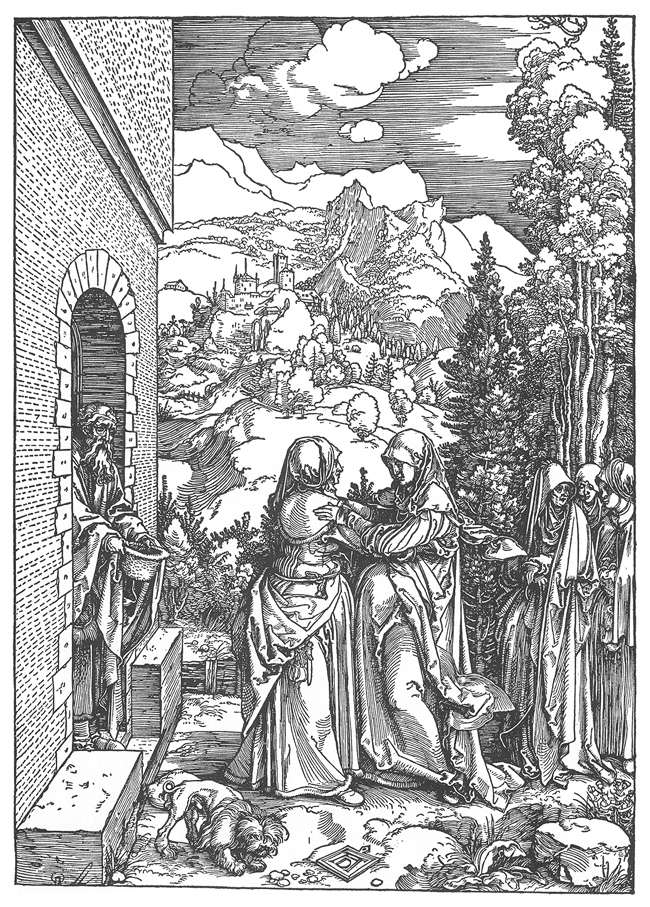
Visitation (1503)

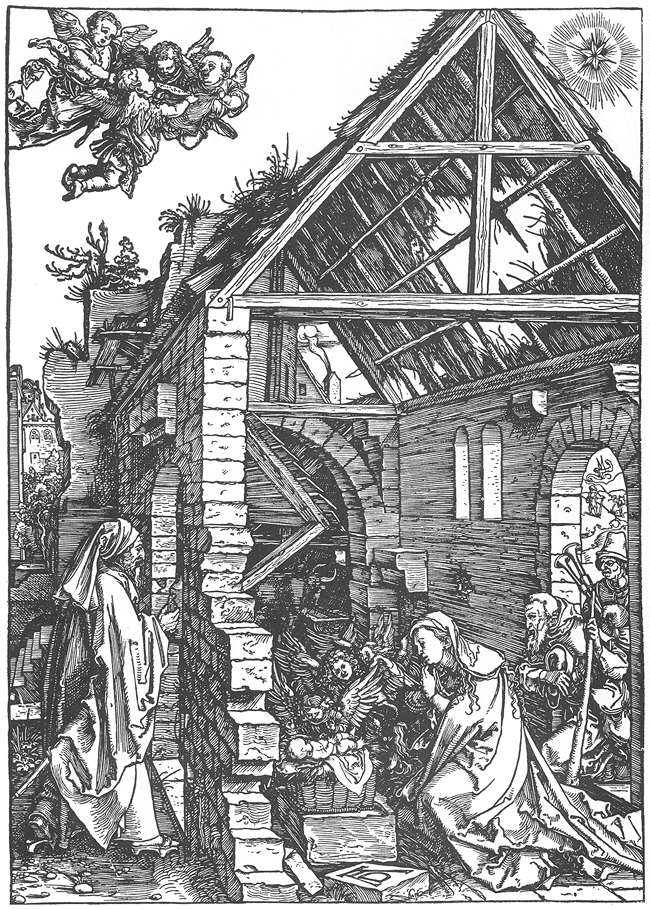
Adoration of the Shepherds (Nativity) (1504-1505)

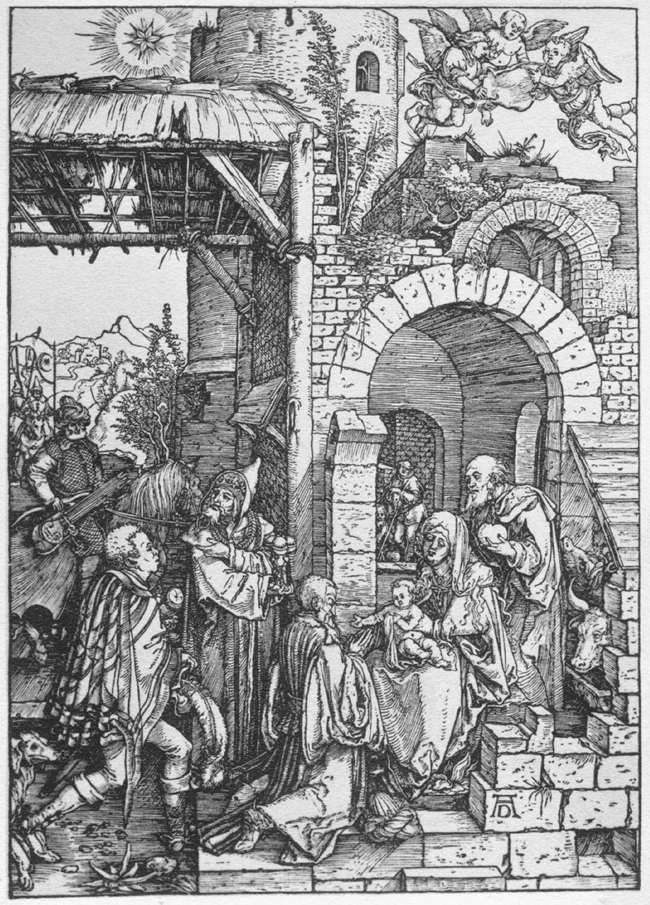
Adoration of the Magi (1501-1502)

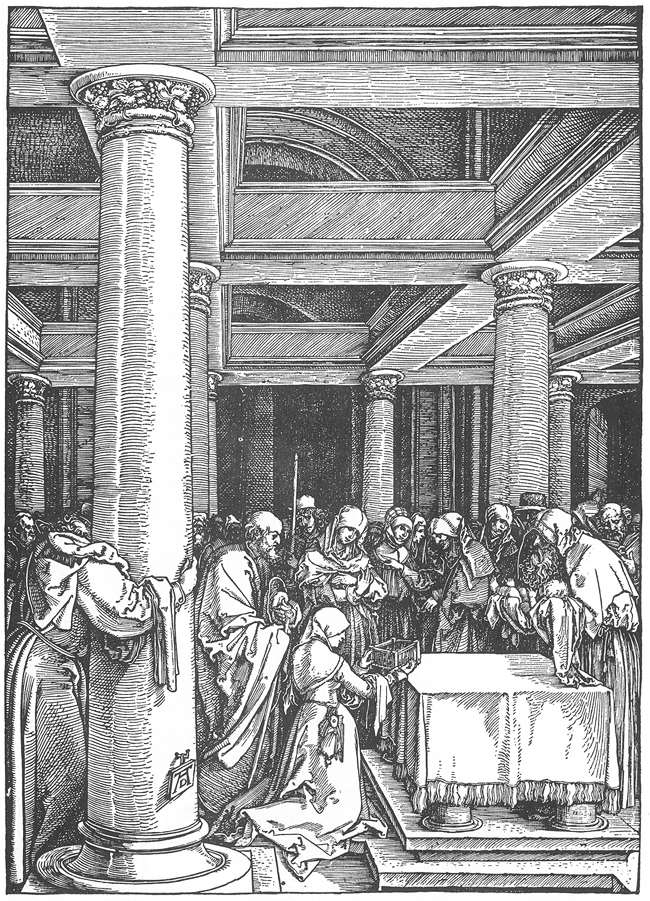
Presentation of Christ in the Temple (1505)

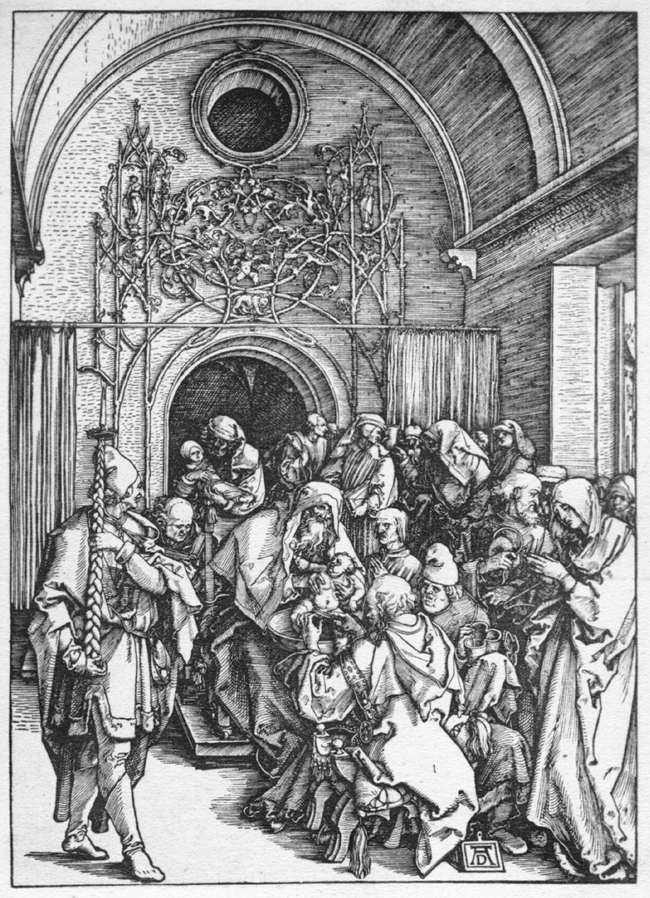
Circumcision of Christ (1505)

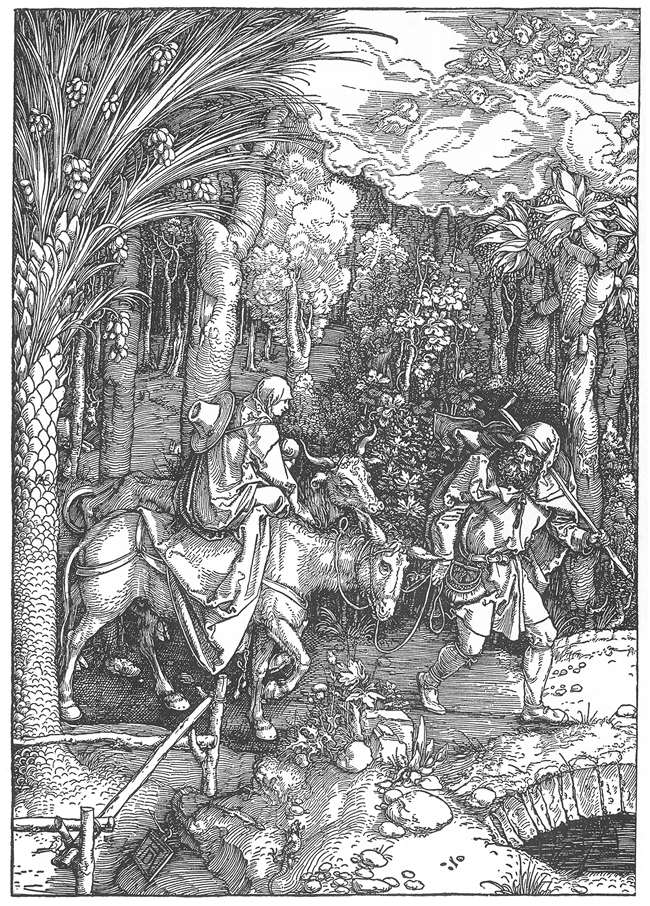
Flight into Egypt (1503)

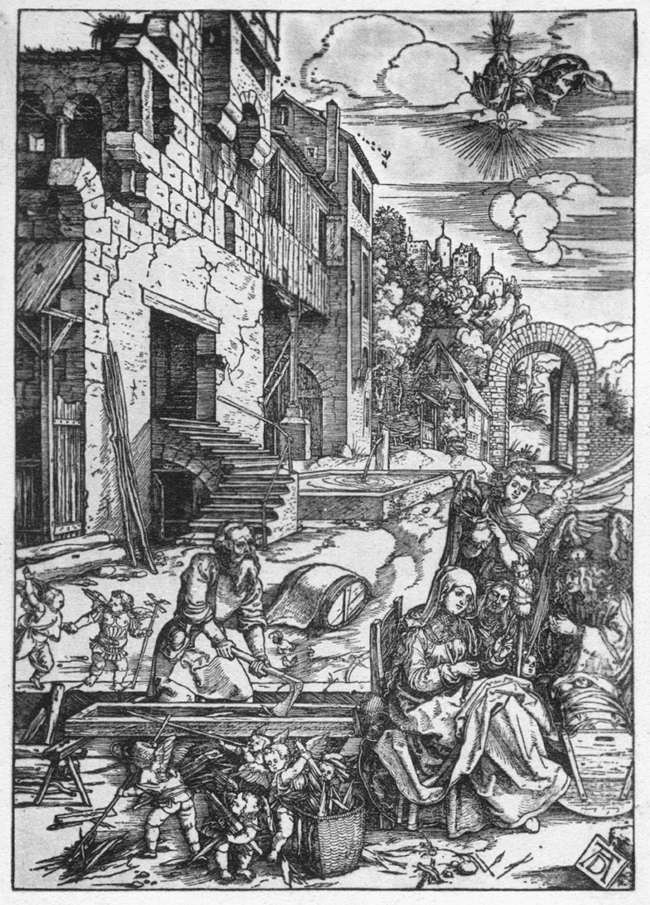
Rest on the Flight into Egypt (1504-1505)

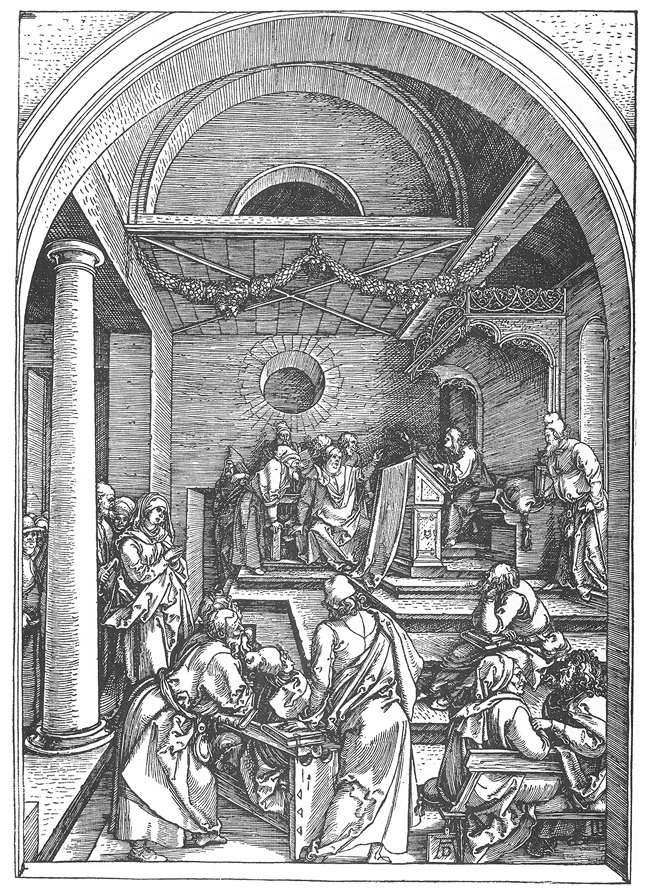
Christ Among the Doctors in the Temple (1503)

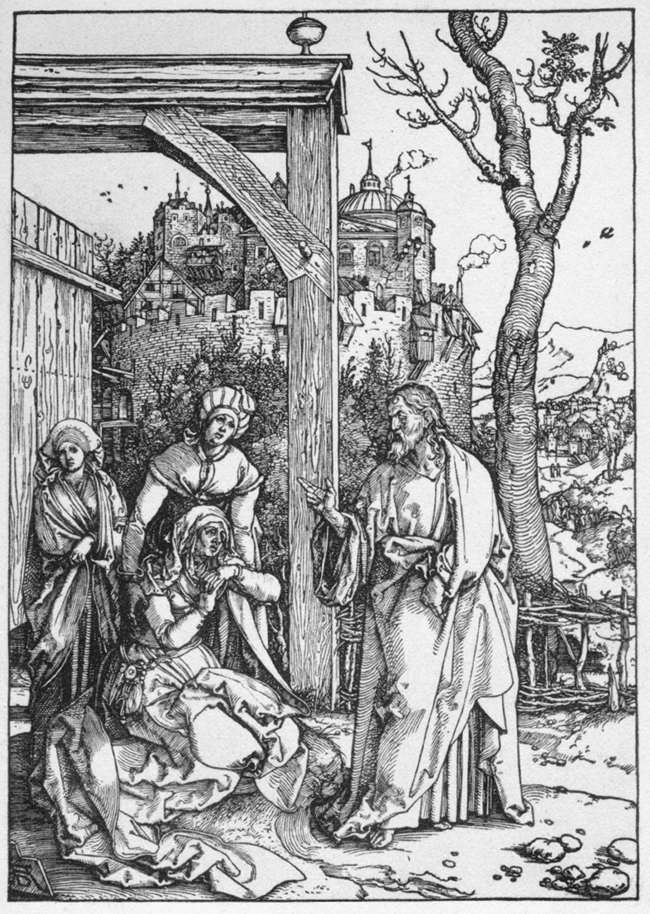
Christ Taking Leave of his Mother (around 1505)

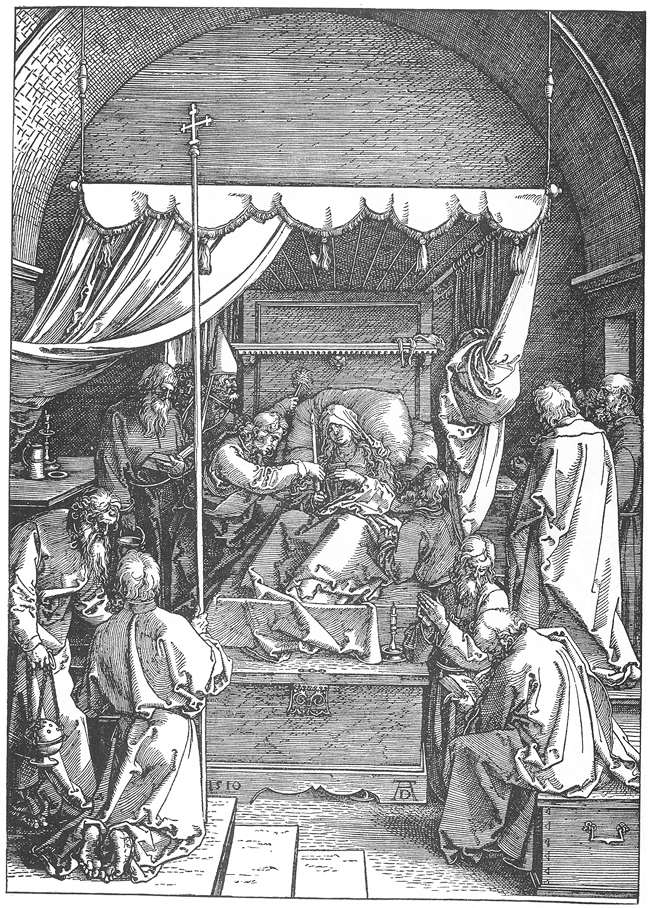
Death of the Virgin (1510)

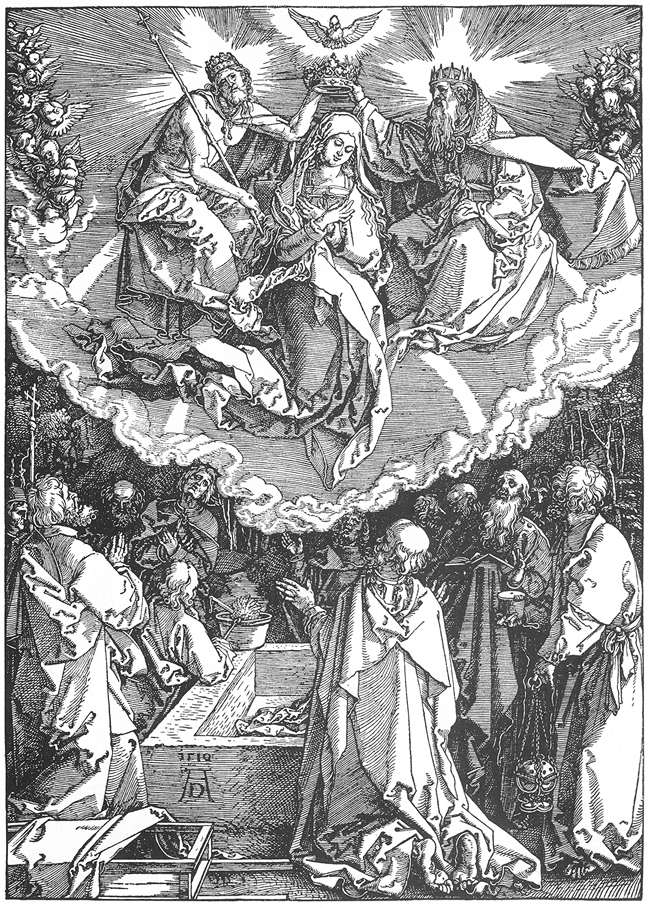
Coronation of the Virgin (1510)

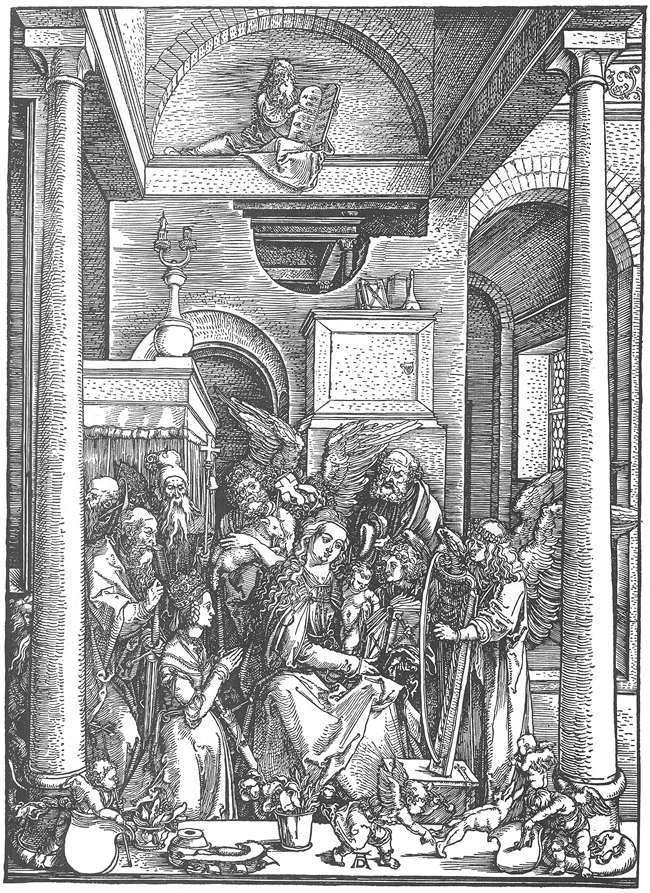
Virgin Adored by Angels and Saints (around 1510)

== See also ==
- List of paintings by Albrecht Dürer
