= Presentation at the Temple (Bellini) =

Painting by Giovanni Bellini

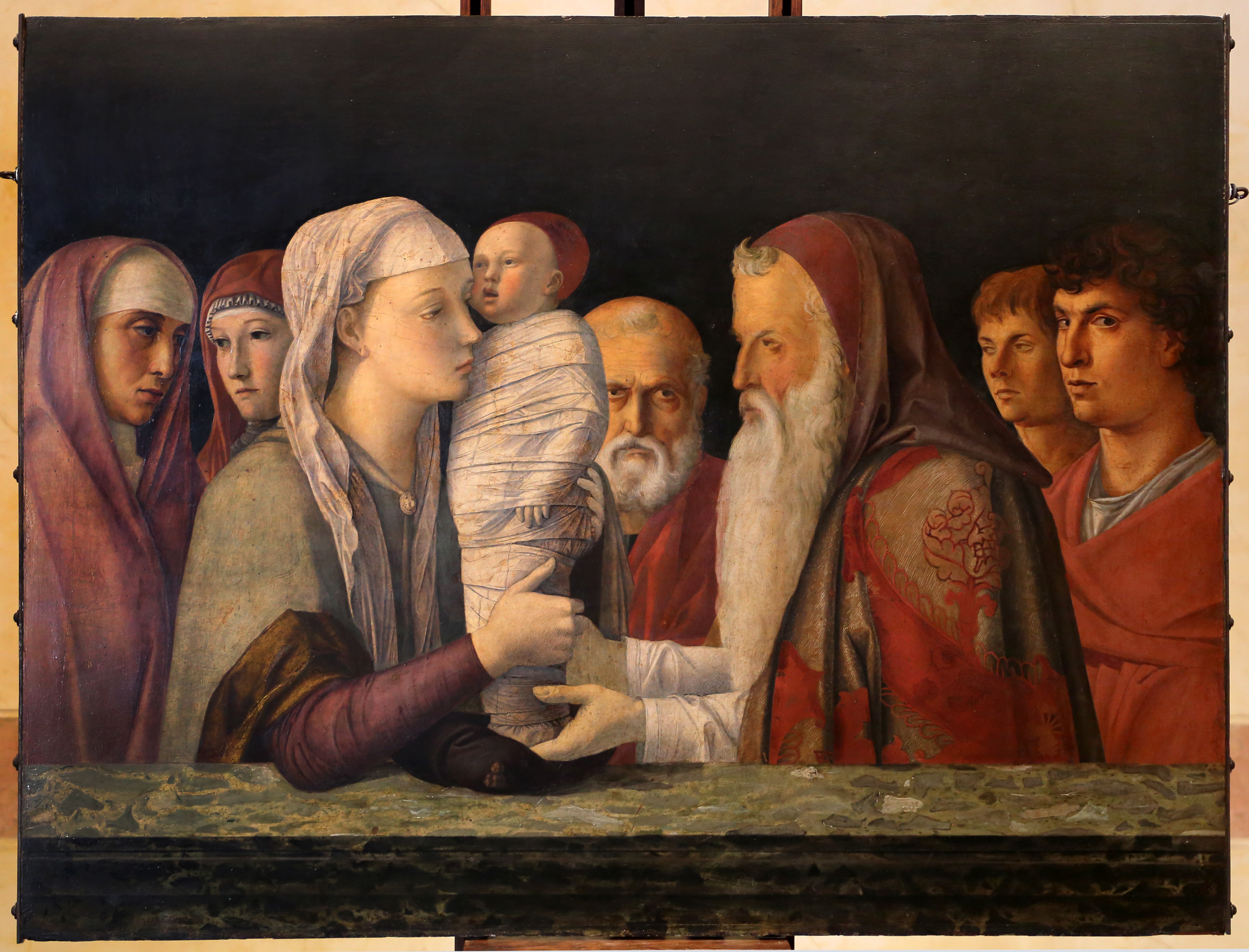
- Artist: Giovanni Bellini
- Year: c. 1460
- Medium: Tempera on panel
- Dimensions: 80 cm × 105 cm (31 in × 41 in)
- Location: Fondazione Querini Stampalia, Venice

The Presentation at the Temple is a painting of the Presentation of Jesus at the Temple by the Venetian master Giovanni Bellini, dating to c. 1460. It is housed in the Fondazione Querini Stampalia, in Venice, Italy.

== History ==
The dating of the work is uncertain, though it is usually considered to be subsequent to the Presentation at the Temple by Andrea Mantegna (Berlin, c. 1455), from which Bellini took a very similar placement of the figures.

The commission of the two works is unknown, as well as if the figures, as is sometimes suggested, portrayed members of the Mantegna and Bellini families.

== Description and style ==
The main characters are nearly the same as those in Mantegna's work: the Virgin is holding the Child, whose feet are lying on a cushion, while the bearded figure of Simeon is coming to take him. In the front is Saint Joseph, which, according to some scholars, would be a portrait of Bellini's father, Jacopo. On the sides the painter added two more figures, which made the picture rather crowded. Apart from his father, other identifications include the author's self-portrait and Mantegna (or his brother Gentile Bellini) for the two men on the right; and Nicolosia, sister of Giovanni and Gentile, and wife of Mantegna, together with their mother Anna for the women on the left.

Bellini also replaced Mantegna's bronze frame with a parapet, making the characters nearer to the observer, and omitted their haloes.

== See also ==
- List of works by Giovanni Bellini

== Sources ==
- Olivari, Mariolina (2007). "Giovanni Bellini". Pittori del Rinascimento. Florence: Scala. 888117099X.
