= Presentation at the Temple (Mantegna) =

Painting by Andrea Mantegna

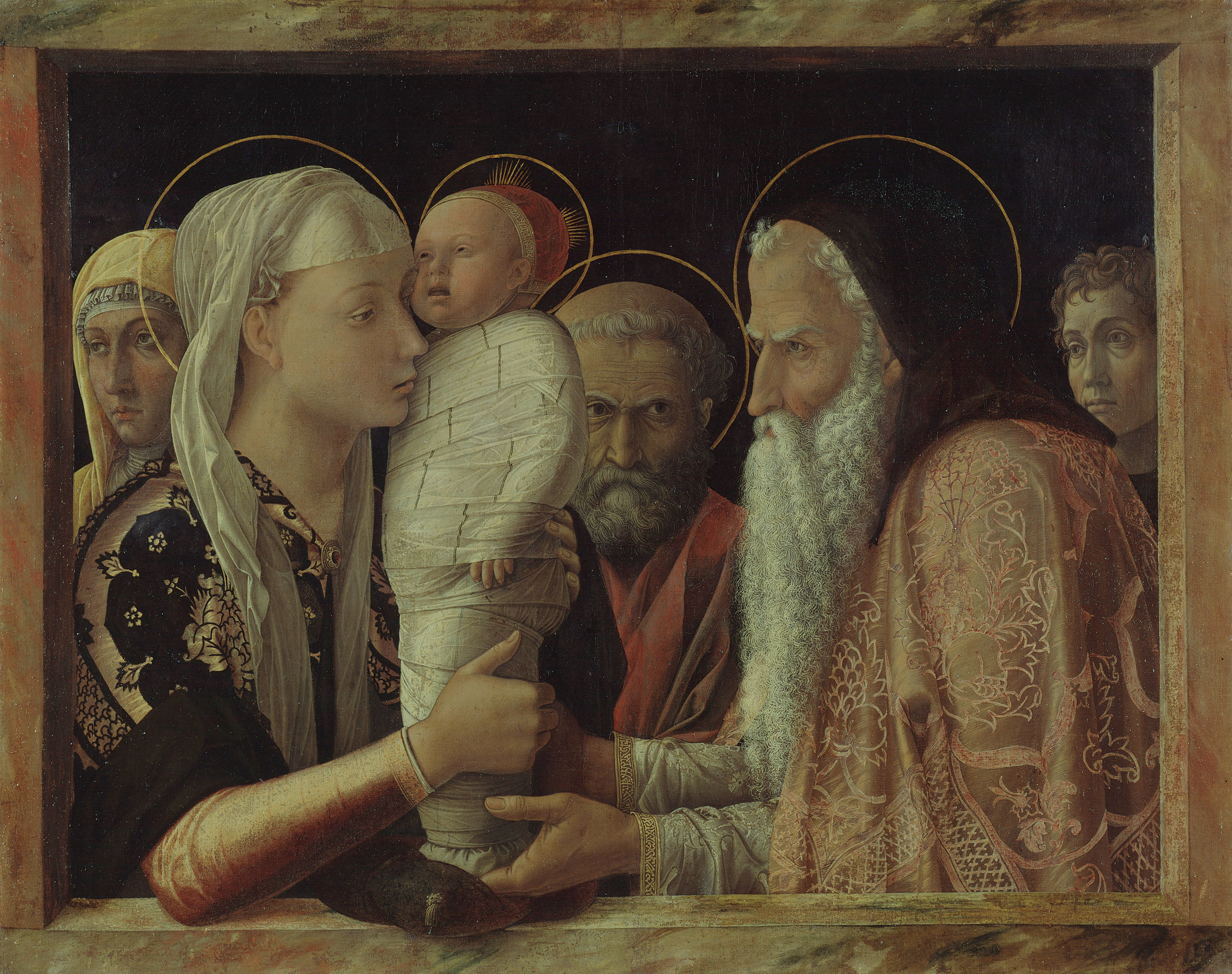
- Artist: Andrea Mantegna
- Year: c. 1455
- Medium: Tempera on canvas
- Dimensions: 68.9 cm × 86.3 cm (27.1 in × 34.0 in)
- Location: Gemäldegalerie, Berlin

The Presentation at the Temple is a painting by the Italian Renaissance artist Andrea Mantegna. Dating to c. 1455, it is housed in the Gemäldegalerie, Berlin, Germany.

== History ==
The date of the painting is unknown, but it belongs to the painter’s youth in Padua. The possible range of dates for the work spans from 1453 (when Mantegna married Nicolosia Bellini, daughter of the painter Jacopo Bellini and sister of painters Giovanni Bellini and Gentile Bellini) to 1460 (when Mantegna left for Mantua). Giovanni Bellini’s Presentation at the Temple, explicitly inspired by Mantegna's, dates to around the latter year.

== Description ==
The scene is set within a marble frame. The cushion on which the Child lies stands on it and partially juts out.

The Virgin Mary, in the foreground, is holding the Child while a bearded priest is near her. At the center, in penumbra, is Joseph with an aureola. Also in the background, at the sides, two spectators without aureola have been identified as possibly Mantegna's self-portrait and a portrait of his wife.
