= Emmaus (disambiguation) =

Emmaus was an ancient town in Judaea mentioned in the Gospel of Luke.

Emmaus may also refer to:

== Places ==
- Emmaus Nicopolis, an archaeological site in Israel
  - Imwas, a Palestinian Arab village formerly located at the site
  - Emmaus (Diocese), an ancient and titular diocese of the Roman Catholic Church
- Emmaus, Pennsylvania, United States
- Emmaus, U.S. Virgin Islands, United States

== Institutions ==
- Emmaus Bible College (Australia) in Epping, Australia
- Emmaus (charity), a homeless charity
- Emmaus College (disambiguation), several schools
- Emmaus High School, Emmaus, Pennsylvania
- Emmaus Monastery in Prague, Czech Republic
- Emmaus University in Dubuque, Iowa

== Events ==
- Battle of Emmaus, 166 BC
- Plague of Emmaus, 639
- Road to Emmaus appearance, one of the early resurrection appearances of Jesus
- Walk to Emmaus, a Methodist adult ministry similar to the Catholic Cursillo

== See also ==
- Supper at Emmaus (disambiguation)
