= Supper at Emmaus (Rembrandt) =

Supper at Emmaus may refer to one of three autograph works by Rembrandt:

- Supper at Emmaus (Rembrandt, Musee Jacquemart-Andre), painting, 1628
- Supper at Emmaus (Rembrandt, Louvre), painting, 1648
- Supper at Emmaus (Rembrandt etching), etching, 1654

A further studio work (1648) is in the National Gallery of Denmark.
