= The Artist in his Studio =

Painting by Rembrandt

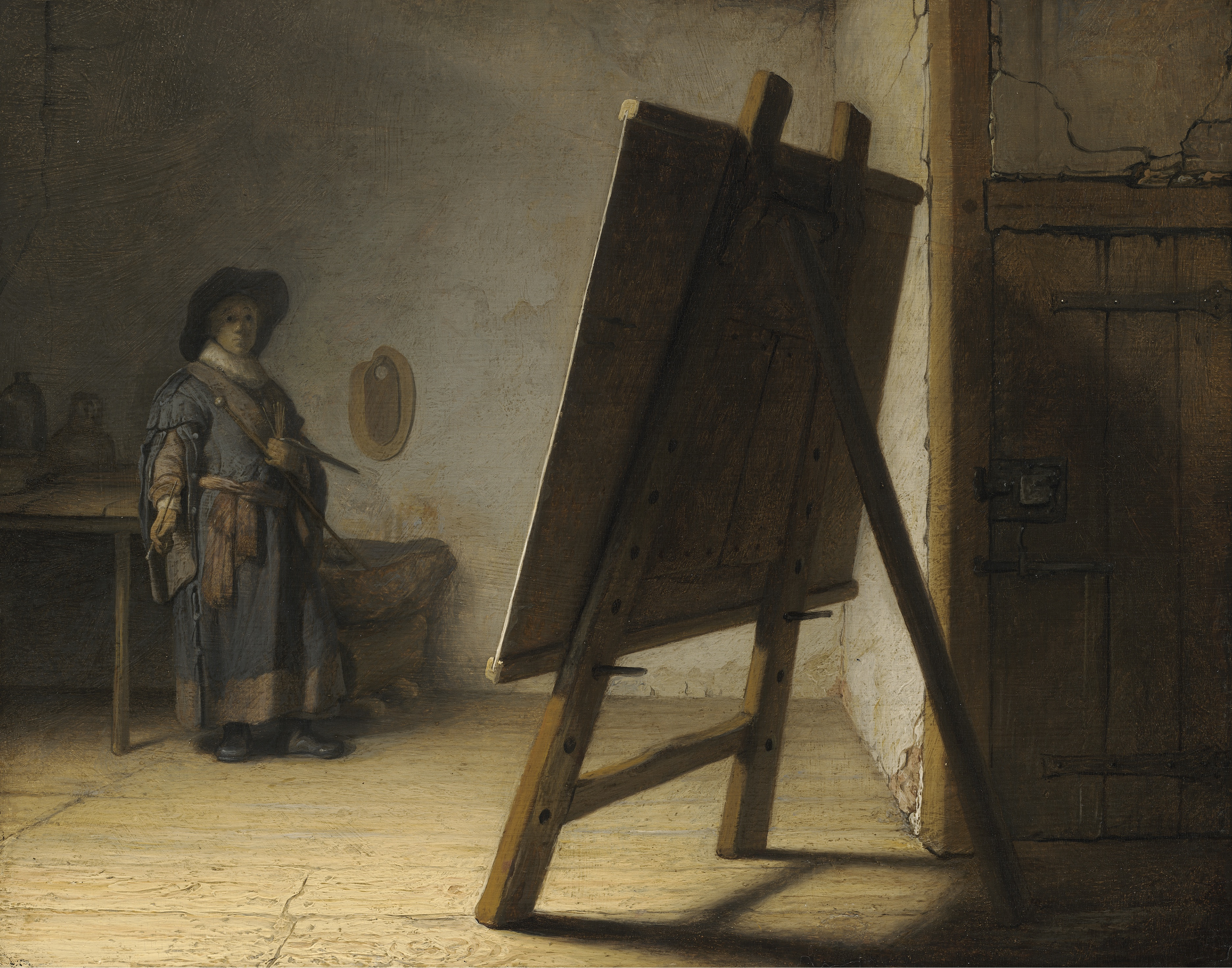
- Artist: Rembrandt van Rijn
- Year: c. 1629
- Type: Oil on panel
- Dimensions: 24.8 cm × 31.7 cm (9.8 in × 12.5 in)
- Location: Museum of Fine Arts, Boston

The Artist in his Studio is the title of an oil painting on panel created by Rembrandt in 1629. The Museum of Fine Arts in Boston, Massachusetts currently holds the painting. The painting depicts an artist standing on the left side of his studio, gazing at an easel on the right side of his studio. The artist is notably standing across the room from the easel, which is turned away from the viewer. The artist's studio depicted in the painting is likely Rembrandt's own studio. Scholars have debated whether the artist represents Rembrandt himself or his student, Gerrit Dou. Rembrandt did not sign this work, but art historians are confident in attributing this work to him because its color scheme and technique resemble those of other works by Rembrandt during this period.

== Description ==
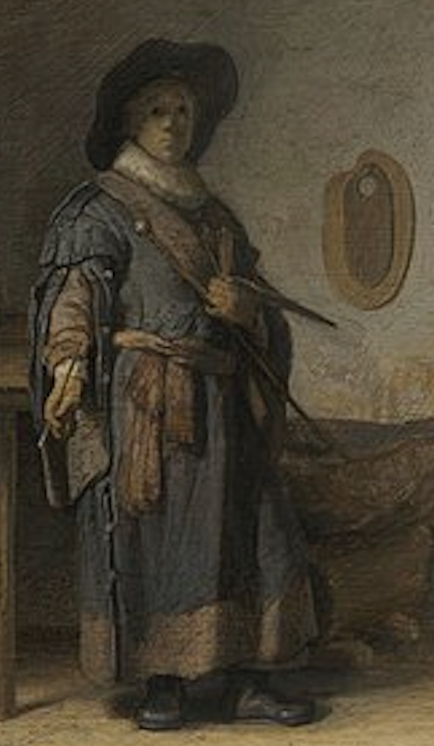
Detail of The Artist in his Studio showing the painter

The painting depicts a painter positioned on the left side of the composition. He wears a tabard, a garment often worn by European men in the late Middle Ages and early modern period. He holds a palette, an assortment of paintbrushes, and a maulstick in his left hand, and a single paintbrush in his right hand. A maulstick is a stick with a soft head that is used in painting to support the working hand. The piece portrays the artist gazing at the easel shown in the foreground of the painting rather than actively painting. He stands a distance from the painting. He is standing rather than sitting, which is notable because artists at the time typically sat to paint.

The setting of the painting is likely Rembrandt's studio, where the unknown artist works. The viewer is unable to see the painting that the artist is working on since the easel is turned away from the viewer. The studio contains very few objects: a table with two bottles, two palettes hanging on the wall, and a grinding stone. All these items relate to painting since the artist would prepare his paint with the grinding stone and the bottles may contain his oil and varnish.

== Analysis ==
Rembrandt uses various techniques to highlight the artist depicted in the painting and his position in relation to the easel. The light source cuts across the panel diagonally from beyond the upper left-hand corner of the painting toward the bottom right. The angled light highlights how the painter stands far from the easel. Rembrandt’s use of shadows reinforces the linear perspective in the work, calling attention to the space between the painter and the easel. Rembrandt draws the viewer’s gaze to the painter because the studio is sparse, with only a few objects related to painting. Signs of wear on the horizontal bar of the easel suggest that the artist often paints sitting while resting his feet, which was common practice for artists during the 17th century. Rembrandt portrays the artist across the room from the easel, not actively painting.

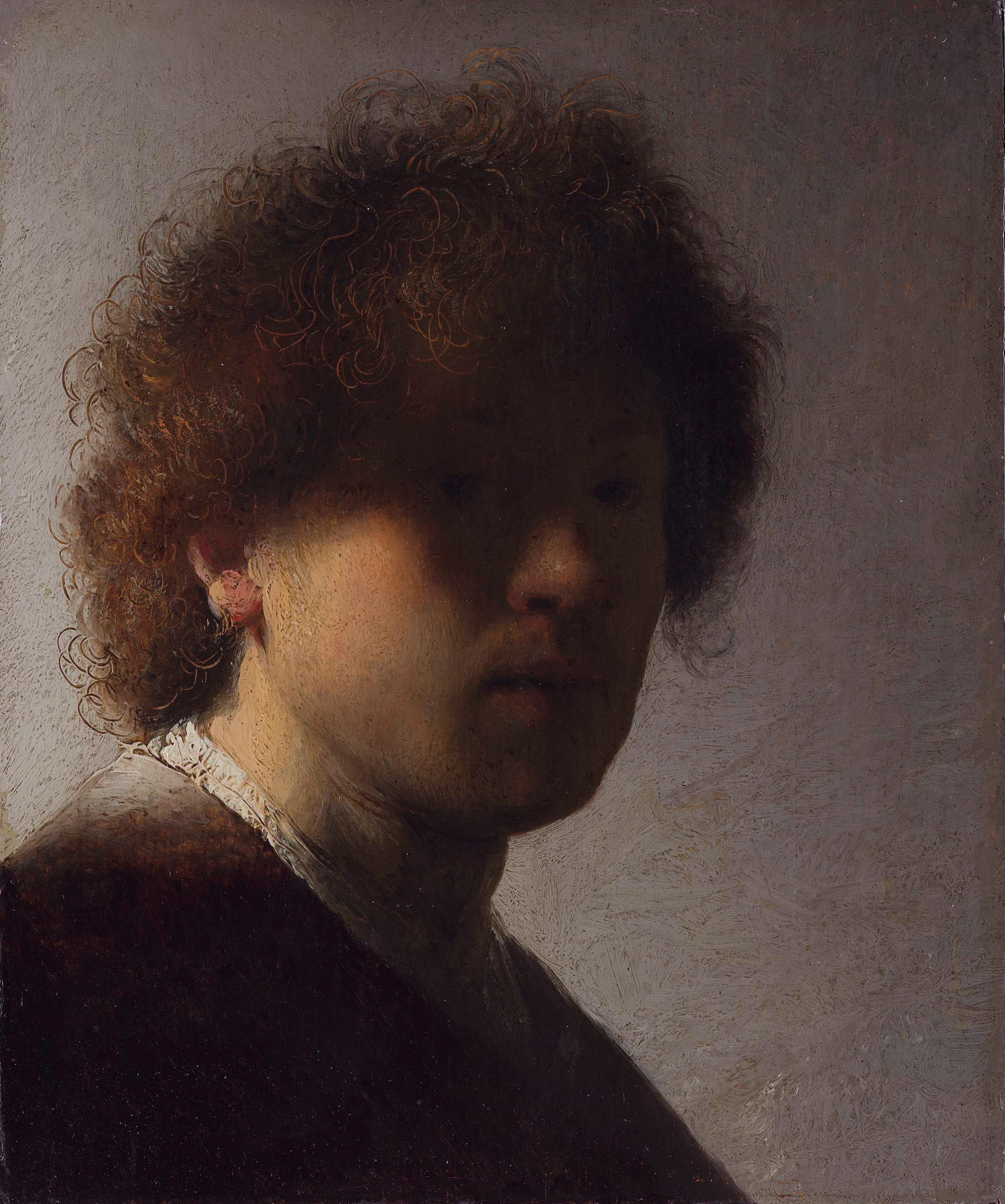
Rembrandt, Amsterdam Self-Portrait as a Young Man, c. 1628

Rembrandt draws the viewer's attention to the easel as it is almost centered in the foreground of the painting. However, the viewer is unable to determine how finished the painting is, or if the artist has even started painting yet, since the panel and easel are turned away from the viewer. During the 17th century, there was an idea that before an artist could begin, he had to fully envision the work he planned in his mind. Rembrandt may have been depicting this idea in art theory in this painting.

Rembrandt likely depicts his own studio in the painting. The artist in the painting is portrayed with light and shadow in a very similar manner to the figures in two of Rembrandt’s self-portraits (Amsterdam Self-Portrait as a Young Man and Munich Self-Portrait as a Young Man). In addition, several characteristics of the studio are consistent with Rembrandt's studio. The studio is located on one of the top two floors of an expensive Dutch townhouse based on the floor plan in the painting and the height of the room. The townhouse would have been built in the late 16th or early 17th centuries because the wooden floorboards are parallel to the back wall.

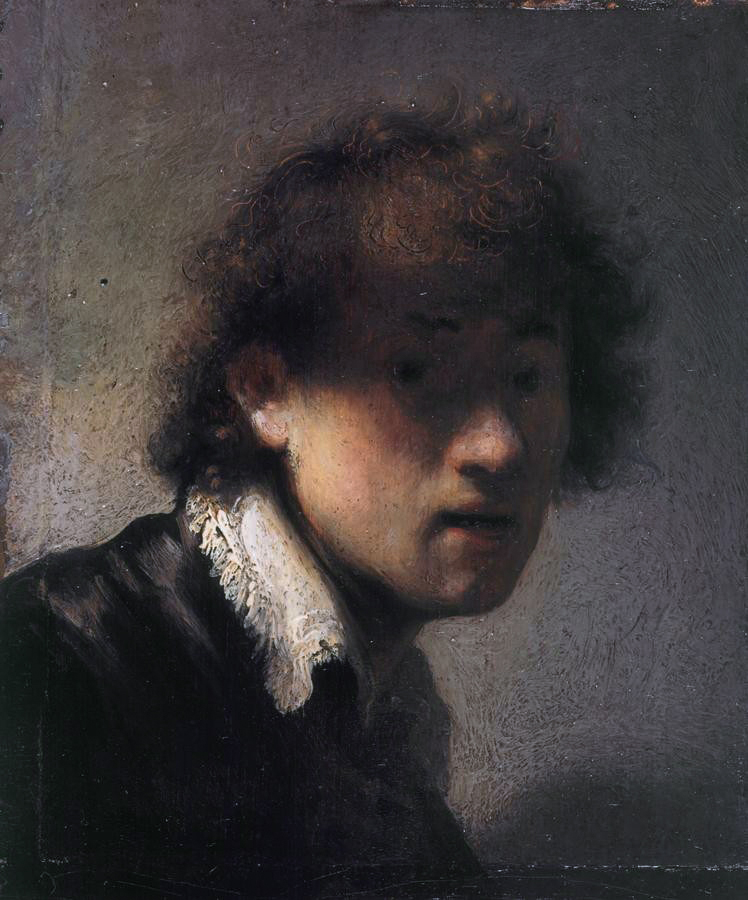
Rembrandt, Munich Self-Portrait as a Young Man, 1629

== Identity of the artist ==
The identity of the figure in The Artist in his Studio has been a subject of debate among scholars, with some describing him as Rembrandt himself and others suggesting that it represents his student, Gerrit Dou. Based on the height and “childlike stature” of the artist, some argue that the painter could be Gerrit Dou since he was only fourteen years old when he became Rembrandt’s pupil. Others assert Rembrandt painted himself because the artist is likely of standard height for an adult male, adjusting for the perspective of the scene. In addition, the facial features of Rembrandt’s self-portraits are similar to those of the artist depicted. Specifically, the eyebrows in his Munich Self-Portrait as a Young Man (1629) resemble those of The Artist in His Studio. Rembrandt may have believed that the artist's identity was not a critical component of the piece, leading him to avoid clearly detailing the facial structure.

== Attributing painting to Rembrandt ==
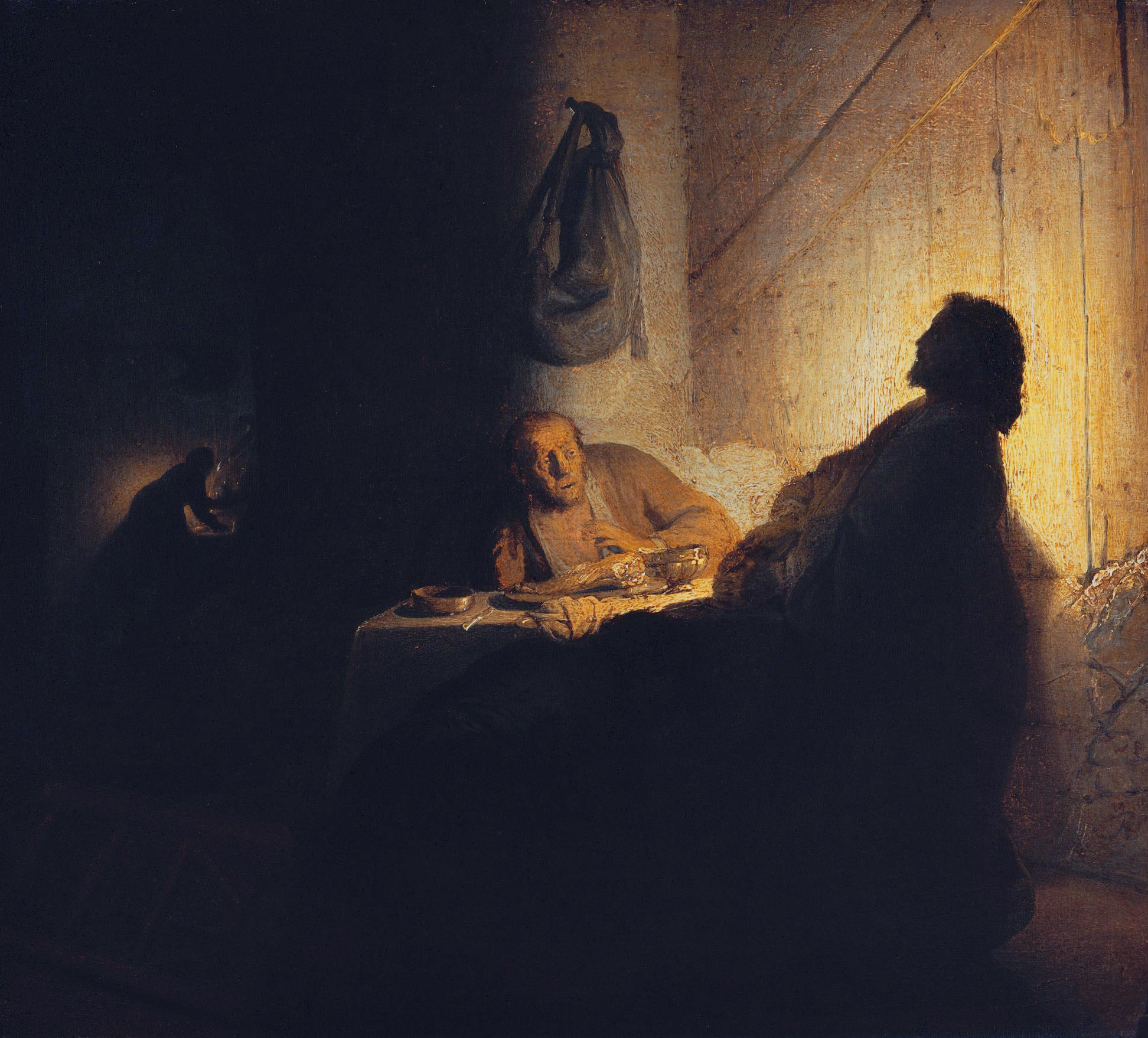
Rembrandt, Supper at Emmaus, 1629

Although there is no signature on the painting, art historians are confident that the painting is Rembrandt’s because both its color scheme and technique align closely with other works by Rembrandt dated 1629.The shaded areas of Rembrandt’s Munich Self-Portrait as a Young Man (1629) are made up of semi-transparent browns and grays that resemble the colors applied to the obscured regions of The Artist in his Studio. In both Supper at Emmaus (1629) and this painting, Rembrandt outlines forms with dark color. Additionally, the tabard that the artist is wearing in the painting is comparable to the garment worn by the old man in the Turin Old man asleep by the fire (1629). In both works, Rembrandt illustrates the texture and depth of the cloth by applying the paint thickly to the panels. Furthermore, the wall in the studio behind the painter resembles the backgrounds in the Munich Self-Portrait as a Young Man (1629) and Amsterdam Self-Portrait as a Young Man (c. 1628), which are a similar pale tone.

== See also ==
- List of paintings by Rembrandt
