= Supper at Emmaus (disambiguation) =

Supper at Emmaus is an event in the Gospel of Luke.

Supper at Emmaus is also the name of several works of art:

- Supper at Emmaus, a woodcut by Albrecht Dürer in his 1511 Small Passion series
- Supper at Emmaus (Pontormo), a 1525 painting by Pontormo in the Uffizi
- Supper at Emmaus (Moretto), a c. 1526 painting by Moretto da Brescia in the Pinacoteca Tosio Martinengo, Brescia
- Supper at Emmaus (Titian), a c. 1531 painting by Titian in the Louvre
- Supper at Emmaus (Titian), a c. 1530–1534 painting by Titian; also a c. 1545 painting by Titian's studio
- Supper at Emmaus (Veronese), a c. 1559–1560 painting by Paolo Veronese
- Supper at Emmaus (Caravaggio, London), a 1601 painting by Caravaggio in the National Gallery, London
- Supper at Emmaus (Caravaggio, Milan), a 1606 painting by Caravaggio in the Pinacoteca di Brera, Milan
- Supper at Emmaus (Rembrandt, Musée Jacquemart-André), a c. 1626 painting by Rembrandt in the Musee Jacquemart-Andre, Paris
- Supper at Emmaus (Stom, Grenoble), a 17th-century painting by Matthias Stom in the Grenoble Museum
- Supper at Emmaus (Rembrandt, Louvre), a 1648 painting by Rembrandt in the Louvre
- Supper at Emmaus, a 1654 etching by Rembrandt in the Rijksmuseum, Amsterdam
- A 1937 forgery by Han van Meegeren in the style of Johannes Vermeer
