= Supper at Emmaus (Pontormo) =

Painting by Pontormo

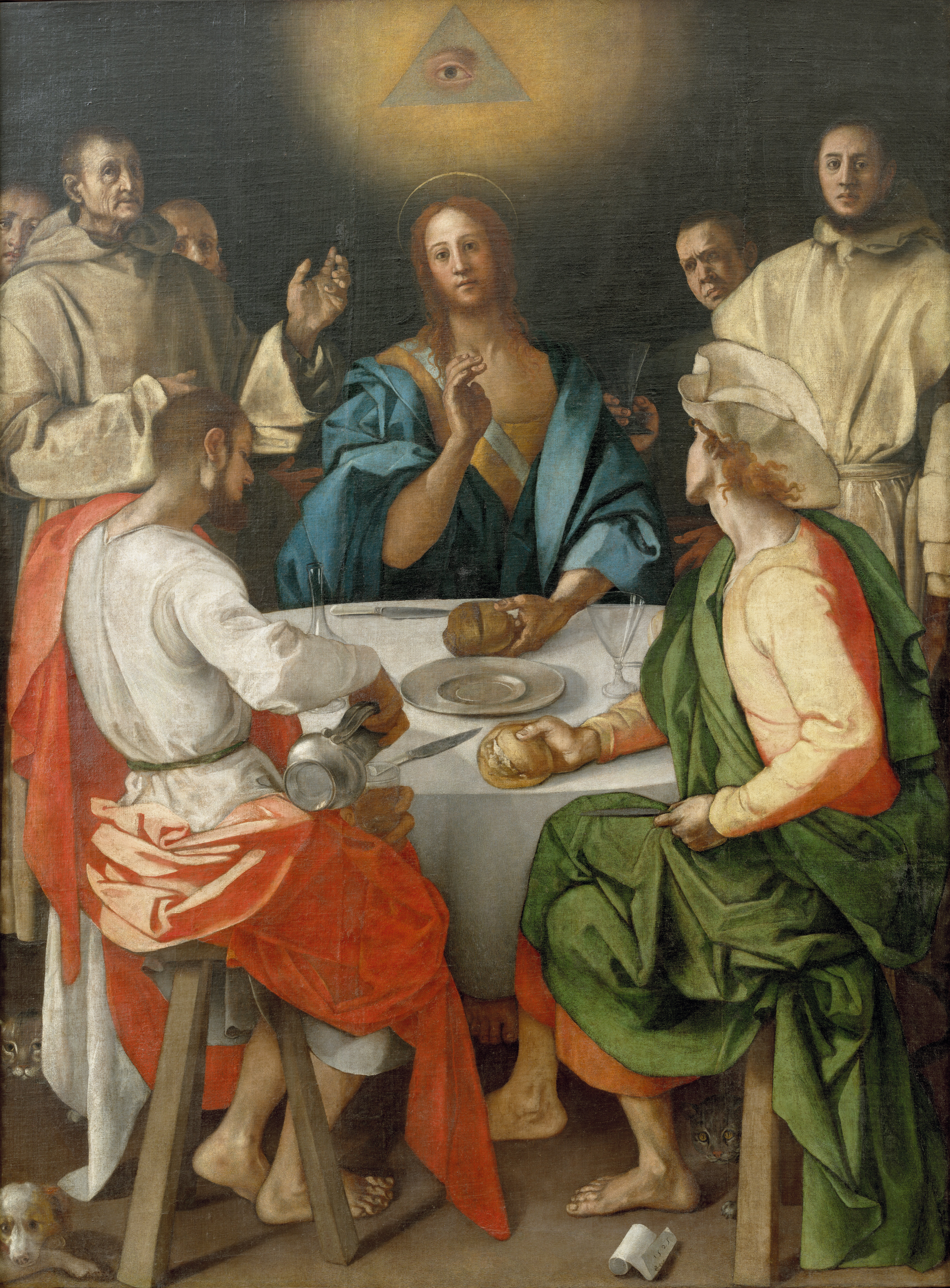
Supper at Emmaus (1525) by Pontormo

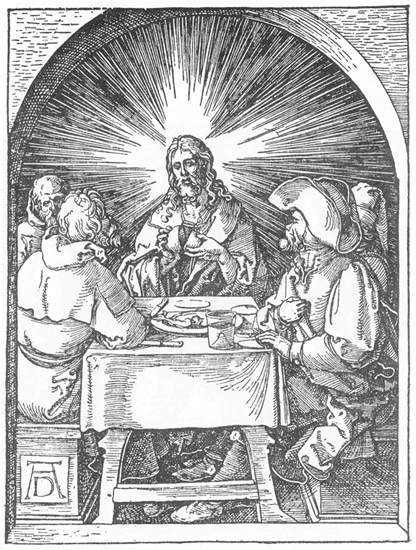
Dürer, Supper at Emmaus, 1511

Supper at Emmaus is a 1525 oil on canvas painting by Pontormo and now in the Uffizi in Florence. It is one of the smallest works signed and dated by the artist, in this case on the abandoned scroll in the foreground.

The work's chiaroscuro, high light-source, realism and freeze-frame composition proved an important precedent for Caravaggio, Velázquez and Francisco de Zurbarán.

== History ==
It was originally commissioned by prior Leonardo Buonafede for the forestry refectory or the dispensary at the Certosa del Galluzzo near Florence, both places intended for welcoming and feeding guests, hence its subject. Two years earlier the artist had taken refuge from the plague there. Several preparatory drawings survive in the Uffizi's Gabinetto dei Disegni e delle Stampe (n. 6656F r e v), the British Museum (1936-10-10-10) and the Staatliche Graphische Sammlung München (nn. 14043 r e v, 14042 r e v). Vasari's Lives of the Artists stated his admiration both for the paintings and for the "German manner" of the frescoes in the Certosa's cloisters (slightly earlier than Pontormo's painting).

== Analysis ==
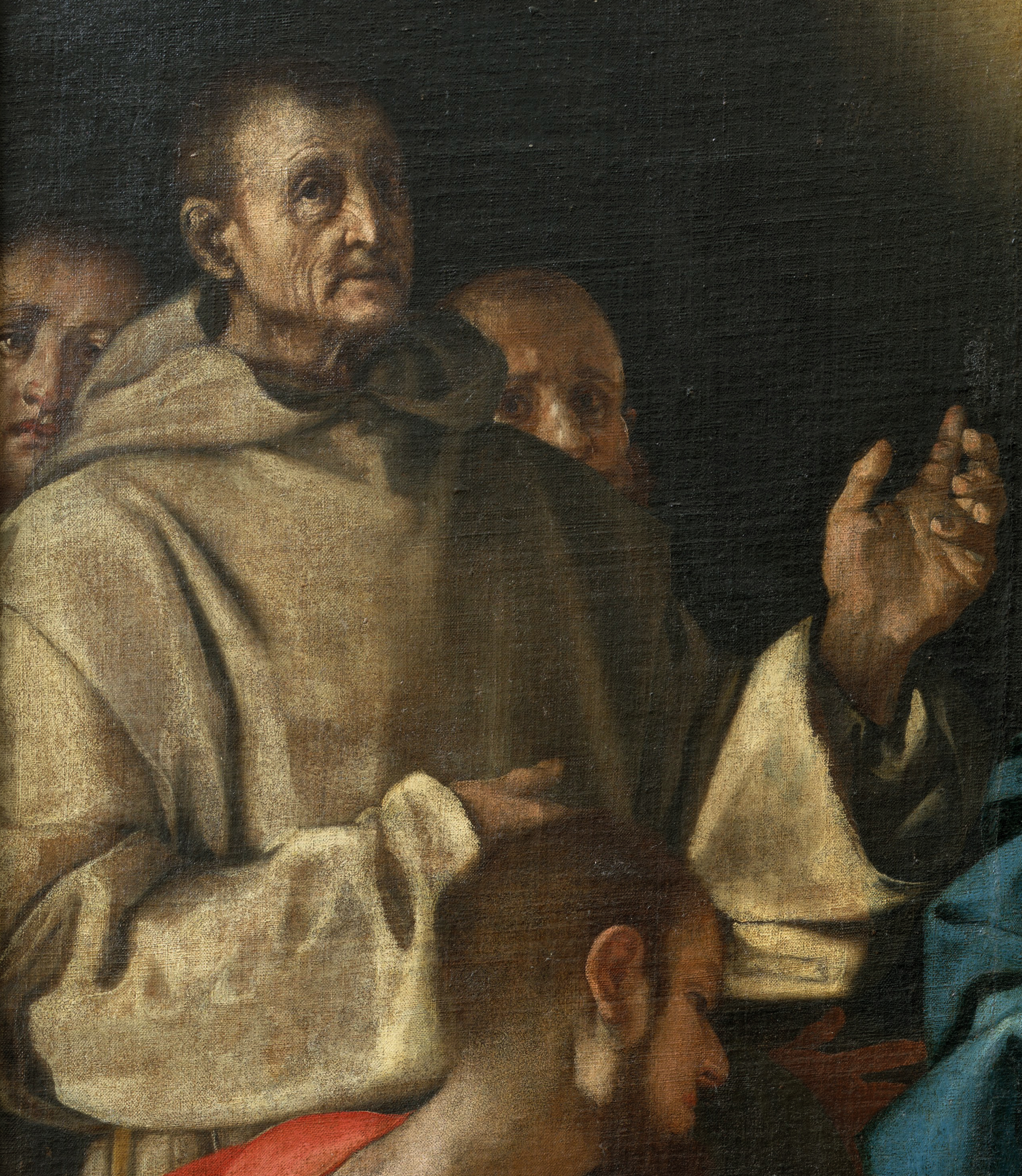
Leonardo Buonafede

The composition is based on a print from Albrecht Dürer 1511 Small Passion series, particularly in Christ's pose and the large tricorn hat worn by Cleophas, the right-hand disciple. Both works represent Christ blessing the bread, his last act before disappearing from the disciples according to the Gospel of Luke. At the top is an eye in a triangle, alluding to the Holy Trinity and the risen Christ's divine nature. It also appears in a copy of Pontormo's work by Empoli still at the Certosa and so it is thought to have been added to the original work by Empoli to mask its three-faced symbol of the Trinity, a symbol banned by the Counter Reformation. In the background are portraits of five of the Certosa's monks at the time the work was produced, including (far left) Buonafede himself, with his left hand raised in a gesture echoing Christ's. He is also shown in Rosso Fiorentino's Spedalingo Altarpiece, now in the same room at the Uffizi.

Its realism in showing everyday details such as the dog and two cats at bottom left, the shining metal plate, the linen tablecloth and the transparent glass bottle owes much to Northern European art of the same era. The high light-source also refers to paintings of the Ascension and the lamp of truth, whilst the tonality and treatment of colour is typical of Pontormo.

== See also ==
- Supper at Emmaus (Caravaggio)
- Supper at Emmaus
- Pontormo
- Mannerism
- The Trinity in art

== Bibliography (in Italian) ==
- Elisabetta Marchetti Letta, Pontormo, Rosso Fiorentino, Scala, Firenze 1994. ISBN 88-8117-028-0
- AA.VV., Galleria degli Uffizi, collana I Grandi Musei del Mondo, Roma 2003.
- Gloria Fossi, Uffizi, Giunti, Firenze 2004, pag. 112. ISBN 88-09-03675-1
