= Emmaus =

Ancient village near Jerusalem

Emmaus Nicopolis
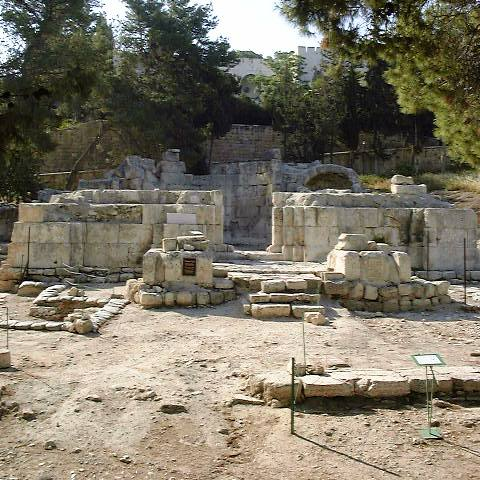
- The Byzantine Basilica of Emmaus Nicopolis (5th–7th cent.), restored by Crusaders during the 12th century

- Location within Israel
- 31°50′21″N 34°59′22″E
- Location: Israel

Emmaus (/ɪˈmeɪəs/ im-AY-əs; Koine Greek: Ἐμμαούς, romanized: Emmaoús; Latin: Emmaus; Arabic: عمواس, romanized: ʿImwās) is a town mentioned in the Gospel of Luke of the New Testament. Luke reports that Jesus appeared, after his death and resurrection, before two of his disciples while they were walking on the road to Emmaus.

Although its geographical identification is not certain, several locations have been suggested throughout history, chiefly Imwas and Al-Qubeiba, both in the West Bank. It is known only that it was connected by a road to Jerusalem; the distance given by Luke varies in different manuscripts and the figure given has been made even more ambiguous by interpretations.

== Names and location ==
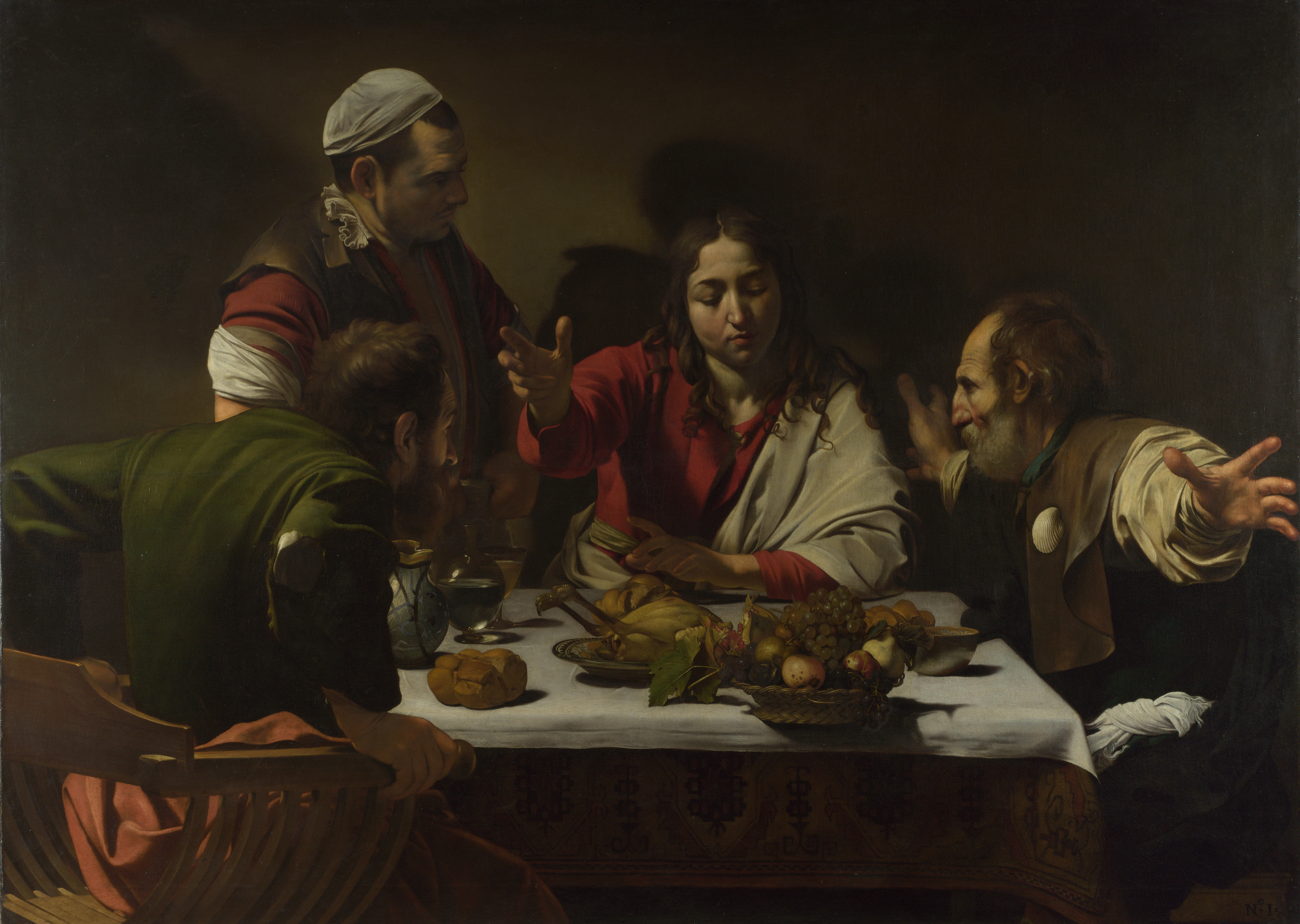
Supper at Emmaus by Caravaggio, 1601

The place-name Emmaus is relatively common in classical sources about the Levant and is usually derived through Greek and Latin from the Semitic word for "warm spring", the Hebrew form of which is hamma or hammat (חמת). In the ancient and present-day Middle East, many sites are named Hama Hamath and variations thereof.

The name for Emmaus was hellenized during the 2nd century BC and appears in Jewish and Greek texts in many variations: Ammaus, Ammaum, Emmaus, Emmaum, Maus, Amus, etc.: Greek: Άμμαούμ, Άμμαούς, Έμμαούμ, Έμμαούς, Hebrew: אמאוס, אמאום, עמאוס, עמאום, עמוס, מאום, אמהום

Emmaus may derive from the Hebrew ḥammat (Hebrew: חמת) meaning "hot spring", although this remains uncertain. It is generally referred to in Hebrew sources as Ḥamtah or Ḥamtān. A spring of Emmaus (Greek: Ἐμμαοῦς πηγή), or alternatively a 'spring of salvation' (Greek: πηγή σωτήριος) is attested in Greek sources. Unlike other Biblical or Mishnaic sites with the name "Ḥamah" and where the traditional Hebrew spelling חמה has been preserved in classical texts throughout the ages, Emmaus differs insofar that the traditional Hebrew spelling for this place in most classical sources is אמאוס or עמאוס. During the late Second Temple period, Emmaus was renamed Nicopolis ("City of Victory"), a name remained in use as late as the 6th-century Madaba Map. Emmaus is mentioned by this name in Midrash Zutta for Song of Songs 6,8 and Midrash Rabba for Lamentations 1,45, and in the Midrash Rabba on Ecclesiastes (7:15). According to Sozomen (fl. 400–450), it was renamed by the Romans "in consequence of the conquest of Jerusalem and the victory over the Jews."

== Emmaus in the New Testament ==
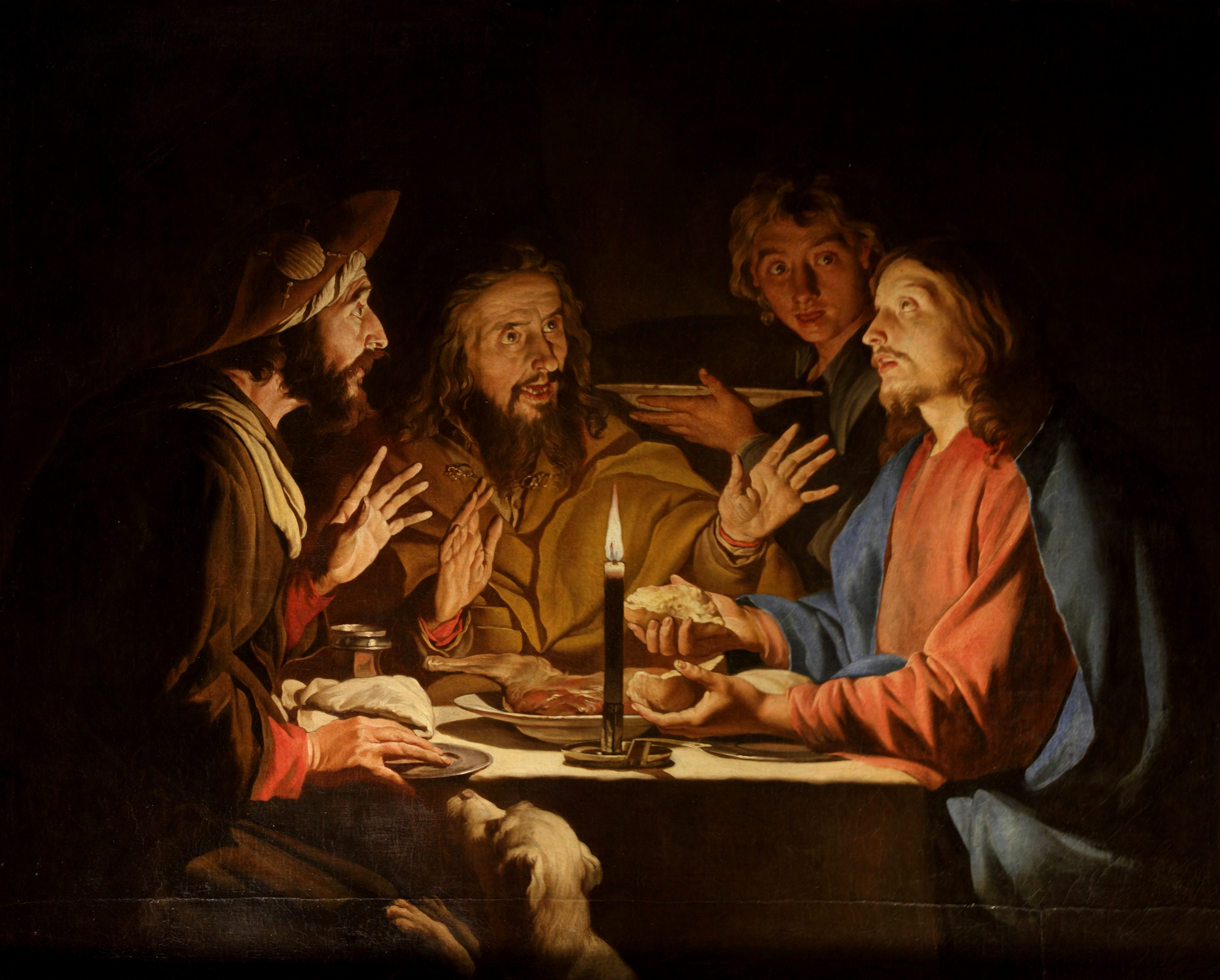
Supper at Emmaus with candlelight by Matthias Stom

Emmaus is mentioned in the Gospel of Luke as the village where Jesus appeared to his disciples after his crucifixion and resurrection. Luke 24:13–35 indicates that Jesus appears after his resurrection to two disciples who are walking from Jerusalem to Emmaus, which is described as being 60 stadia (10.4 to 12 km depending on what definition of stadion is used) from Jerusalem. One of the disciples is named Cleopas (verse 18), while his companion remains unnamed:

That very day two of them were going to a village (one hundred and) sixty stadia away from Jerusalem called Emmaus, and they were speaking about all the things that had occurred. And it happened that while they were speaking and debating, Jesus himself drew near and walked with them, but their eyes were prevented from recognizing him … As they approached the village to which they were going, he gave the impression that he was going on further. But they urged him, "Stay with us, for it is nearly evening and the day is declining." So he went in to stay with them. And it happened that, while he was with them at table, he took bread, said the blessing, broke it, and gave it to them. With that their eyes were opened and they recognized him.

According to the gospel, the story takes place in the evening of the day of Jesus's resurrection. The two disciples hear that the tomb of Jesus was found empty earlier that day. They are discussing the events of the past few days when a stranger asks them what they are discussing. "Their eyes were kept from recognizing him." He rebukes them for their unbelief and explains prophecies about the Messiah to them. On reaching Emmaus, they ask the stranger to join them for the evening meal.

When he breaks the bread, "their eyes [are] opened" and they recognize him as the resurrected Christ. Jesus immediately vanishes. Cleopas and his friend then hasten back to Jerusalem to carry the news to the other disciples.

A similar event is mentioned in the Gospel of Mark (Mark 16:12–16:13), although the disciples' destination is not stated. This passage is believed by some to be a late addition, derived from the Gospel of Luke.

The incident is not mentioned in the Gospels of Matthew or John.

== Possible locations ==
Emmaus is the Greek variant of the Hebrew word and place-name for hot springs, hammat, and is therefore not unique to one location, which makes the identification of the New Testament site more difficult.

Several places in Judea and Galilee are called Emmaus in the Bible, the works of Josephus Flavius, and other sources from the relevant period. The one most often mentioned is a town of some importance situated in the Valley of Ajalon (today, Ayyalon), later called Emmaus Nicopolis.

== Historical identification ==
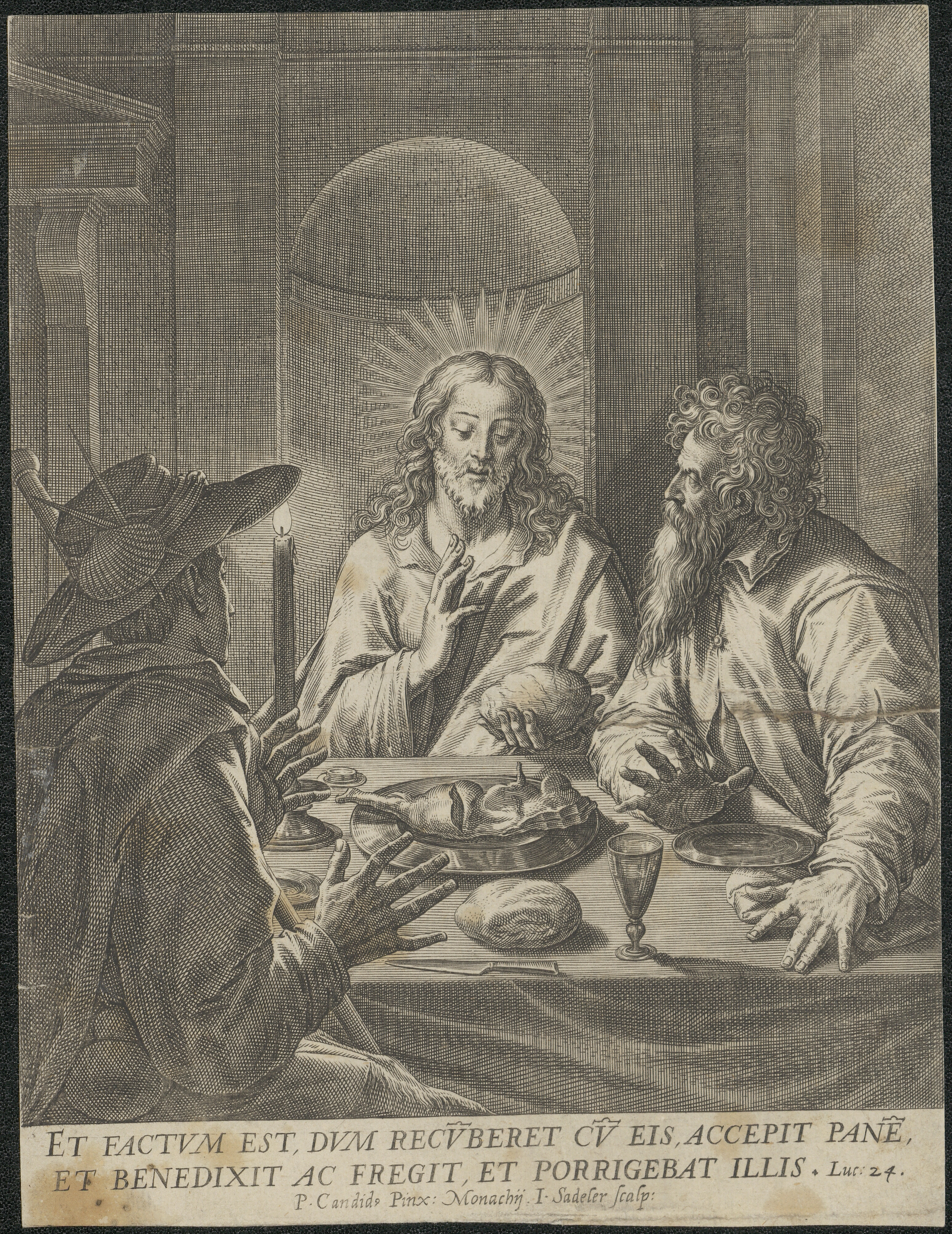
Print of the Diner in Emmaüs. Preserved in the Ghent University Library.

Many sites have been suggested for the biblical Emmaus, among them Emmaus Nicopolis (c. 160 stadia from Jerusalem), Kiryat Anavim (66 stadia from Jerusalem on the carriage road to Jaffa), Coloniya (c. 36 stadia on the carriage road to Jaffa), el-Kubeibeh (63 stadia, on the Roman road to Lydda), Artas (60 stadia from Jerusalem) and Khurbet al-Khamasa (86 stadia on the Roman road to Eleutheropolis). The oldest identification that is currently known is Emmaus Nicopolis. The identification is complicated by the fact that New Testament manuscripts list at least three different distances between Jerusalem and Emmaus in Luke 24:13-14.

=== Emmaus Nicopolis/Imwas ===
The first modern site identification of Emmaus was by the explorer Edward Robinson, who equated it with the Palestinian Arab village of Imwas (Arabic: عِمواس), near the Latrun Abbey. Before its destruction during the Six-Day War in 1967, the village of Imwas was located at the end of the Ayalon Valley, on the border of the hill country of Judah, at 153 stadia (18.6 miles) from Jerusalem via the Kiryat Yearim Ridge Route, 161 stadia (19.6 miles) via the Beth-Horon Ridge Route and 1,600 feet (490 m) lower by elevation.

Eusebius was probably the first to mention Nicopolis as biblical Emmaus in his Onomasticon. Jerome, who translated Eusebius' book, implied in his letter 108 that there was a church in Nicopolis built in the house of Cleopas where Jesus broke bread on that late journey. From the 4th century on, the site was commonly identified as the biblical Emmaus.

Emmaus Nicopolis appears on Roman geographical maps. The Peutinger Table situates it about 31 km (19 mi) west of Jerusalem, while the Ptolemy map shows it at a distance of 32 km (20 mi) from the city. The Emmaus in the Gospel of Luke seems to lie some 12.1 km (7.5 mi) from Jerusalem, though a textual minor variant, conserved in Codex Sinaiticus, gives the distance between the New Testament Emmaus and Jerusalem as 160 stadia. The geographical position of Emmaus is described in the Jerusalem Talmud, Tractate Sheviit 9.2:

From Bet Horon to the Sea is one domain. Yet is it one domain without regions? Rabbi Johanan said, "Still there is Mountain, Lowland, and Valley. From Bet Horon to Emmaus (Hebrew: אמאום, lit. 'Emmaum') it is Mountain, from Emmaus to Lydda Lowland, from Lydda to the Sea Valley. Then there should be four stated? They are adjacent."

Archaeologically, many remains have been excavated at the site of the former Palestinian village, now located inside Canada Park, which support historical and traditional claims. Five structures were found and dated, including a Christian basilica from the 6th century and a 12th-century Crusader church. Emmaus Nicopolis is a titular see of the Roman Catholic Church.

There are several sources giving information about this town's ancient history, among them the First Book of Maccabees, the works of Josephus, and chronicles from the Late Roman, Byzantine and Early Muslim periods. According to 1 Maccabees 3:55-4:22, around 166 BC Judas Maccabeus fought against the Seleucids in the region of this particular Emmaus, and was victorious at the Battle of Emmaus; later, this town was fortified by Bacchides, a Seleucid general (1 Macc 9:50). When Rome took over the land it became the capital of a district or toparchy, and was burnt by order of Varus after the death of Herod in 4 BC. During the First Jewish Revolt, before the siege of Jerusalem, Vespasian's 5th legion was deployed there while the 10th Legion was in Jericho. The town was renamed Emmaus Nicopolis in AD 221 by Emperor Elagabalus, who conferred it the title of polis ("city") following the request of a delegation from Emmaus. The Plague of Emmaus in AD 639, mentioned in Muslim sources, is claimed to have caused up to 25,000 deaths in the town.

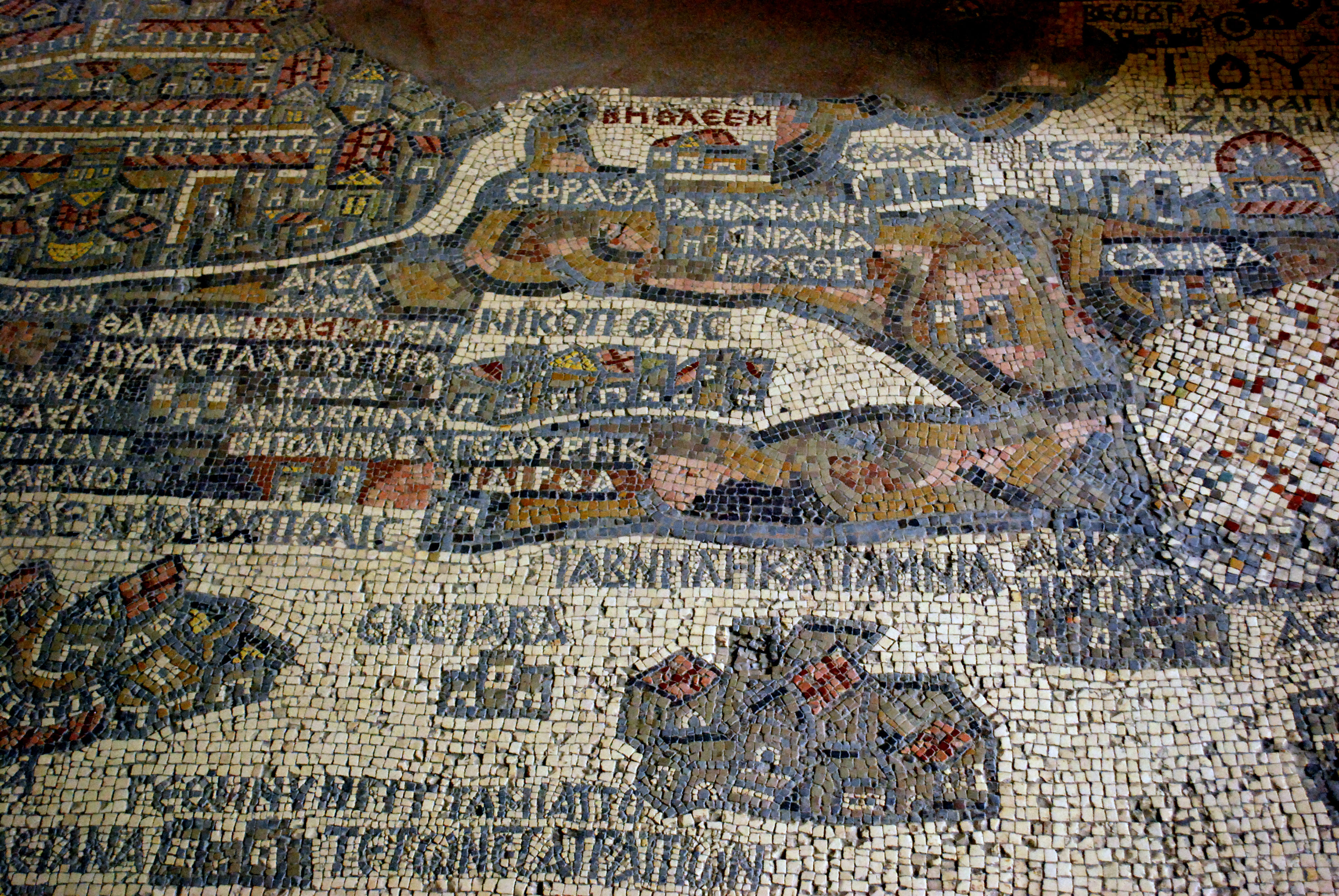
Emmaus Nicopolis on Madaba map

Nicopolis (Ancient Greek: Νικόπολις, Nikópolis) was the name of Emmaus (Hebrew: אמאוס; Ancient Greek: Ἀμμαοῦς, Ammaoûs; Arabic: عِمواس, Imwas) under the Roman Empire until the conquest of Palestine by the Rashidun Caliphate in 639. The Church Fathers unanimously considered this city to be the Emmaus of the New Testament where Jesus was said to have appeared after his death and resurrection; it is sometimes distinguished from other Emmauses of Palestine and other Nicopolises of the Roman Empire by the combined name Emmaus Nicopolis or Emmaus-Nicopolis. The site of the ancient city, now lies between Tel Aviv and Jerusalem in Israel. The archaeological site has been cared for by a resident French Catholic community since 1993 but are formally organized as a part of Canada Park under the general supervision of the Israel Nature and Parks Authority.

==== Hellenistic, Hasmonean period ====
Due to its strategic position, Emmaus played an important administrative, military and economic role in history. The first mention of Emmaus occurs in the First Book of Maccabees, chapters 3–4, in the context of Judas Maccabeus and his revolt against the Greek Seleucid Empire in the 2nd century BC. The first major battle of the revolt, the Battle of Emmaus, is traditionally believed to have occurred in this area, with the Seleucids establishing a fortified camp here from which to control the countryside. During the Hasmonean period, Emmaus became a regional administrative centre (toparchy) in the Ayalon Valley.

According to one theory, Emmaus of the Hasmonean and early Roman periods was located at Horvat 'Eqed.

==== Roman period ====
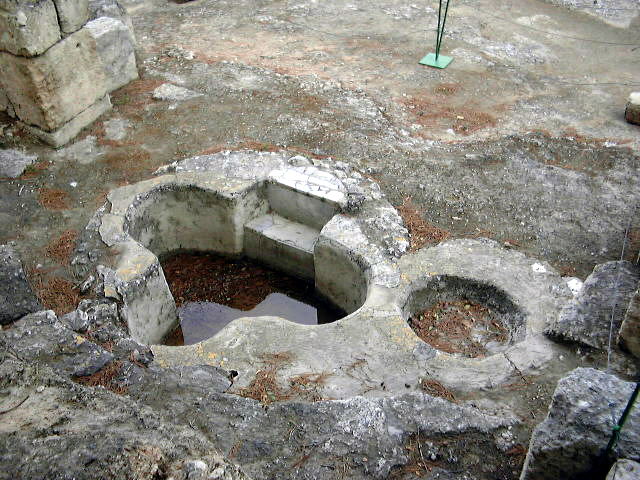
Byzantine baptistery at Emmaus Nicopolis

Josephus Flavius mentions Emmaus in his writings several times. He speaks about the destruction of Emmaus by the Romans in 4 BC. The importance of the city was recognized by the Emperor Vespasian, who established a fortified camp there in AD 68 to house the fifth ("Macedonian") legion, populating it with 800 veterans, though this may refer to Qalunya rather than Emmaus Nicopolis. Archaeological works indicate that the town was cosmopolitan, with a mixed Jewish, pagan and Samaritan population. In AD 130 or 131, the city was destroyed by an earthquake. In 132, the ruins of Emmaus fortress were briefly reconstructed by Judean rebels under Simon Bar Kokhba and used as a hideout during the revolt.

The city of Nicopolis was founded on the ruins of Emmaus in early 3rd century, after Julius Africanus, who said he had interviewed descendants of Jesus' relatives, headed an embassy to Rome and had an interview with the Roman emperor Elagabalus on behalf of Emmaus, then a small Palestinian village (κώμη). St. Eusebius writes "Emmaus, whence was Cleopas who is mentioned by the Evangelist Luke. Today it is Nicopolis, a famous city of Palestine." In 222, a basilica was erected there, which was rebuilt first by the Byzantines and later modified by the Crusaders.

Archaeological evidence attests to the existence of a Samaritan synagogue at the site: a limestone capital, discovered in secondary use in the floor of a twelfth-century church, is believed to have originally belonged to this synagogue. The capital, in a debased Ionic style, bears two inscriptions — one in Hebrew (ברוך שמו לעולם, "Blessed be His Name forever") and the other in Greek (EIC ΘEOC, "One God") — suggesting its function as part of the façade of the synagogue's Holy Ark.

==== Byzantine period ====
During the Byzantine period Nicopolis became a bishopric and a substantial church complex was erected on the spot where tradition maintained the apparition of the risen Christ had occurred, a site which then became a place of pilgrimage, and whose ruins are still extant.

==== Early Muslim period ====
At the time of the Islamic conquest of Palestine, the main encampment of the Arab army was established in Emmaus, when a plague (ța'ūn) struck, carrying off many of Companions of the Prophet. This first encounter of the Arab armies with the chronic plagues of Syria was later referred to as the 'plague of 'Amawās', a and the event marked the decline of Emmaus Nicopolis. A well on the site still bears an inscription reading "the well of the plague" (bi'r aț-ța'ūn).

==== Crusader period ====
During the Crusader period, the Christian presence resumed at Emmaus, and the Byzantine church was restored. However, the memory of the apparition of the risen Jesus at Emmaus also started to be celebrated in three other places in the Holy Land: Motza (c. 4 mi or 6 km west of Jerusalem), Qubeibe (c. 7 mi or 11 km northwest of Jerusalem), and Abu Ghosh (c. 7 mi or 11 km west of Jerusalem).

==== Ottoman period ====
The Arab village of Imwas was identified once again as the biblical Emmaus and the Roman-Byzantine Nicopolis by scholars in the 19th century, including Edward Robinson(1838–1852), M.-V. Guérin (1868), Charles Simon Clermont-Ganneau (1874), and J.-B. Guillemot (1880–1887). Significantly, a local mystic named Saint Mariam of Jesus Crucified, a nun of the Carmelite monastery of Bethlehem, had a revelation while in ecstatic prayer in 1878 in which Jesus appeared to indicate Amwas was the Gospel Emmaus. "She came to the top of a knoll where, amid grass and thorns, there were some freestones leveled. Transported and moved, she turned toward her sisters [in religion], and said to them in a loud voice: 'This is truly the place where our Lord ate with His disciples.'" On the basis of this revelation, the holy place of Emmaus was acquired by the Carmelite order from the Muslims in 1878, excavations were carried out, and the flow of pilgrims to Emmaus resumed.

==== British Mandate ====
In 1930, the Carmelite Order built a monastery, the House of Peace, on the tract of land purchased in 1878. In November 1947, the United Nations Partition Plan for Palestine attributed the area to the Arab State. Prior to the outbreak of hostilities in the 1948 Arab–Israeli War, ʻImwâs had a population of 1,100 Arabs.

==== Jordan ====
Israelis and Jordanians fought during the battle of Latrun for the control of this strategic zone which blockaded the road to Jerusalem. As part of the outcome of the war the Palestinian village of Imwas, which lay on the site of Emmaus Nicopolis, fell within the West Bank territory under Jordanian rule.

==== Israel ====
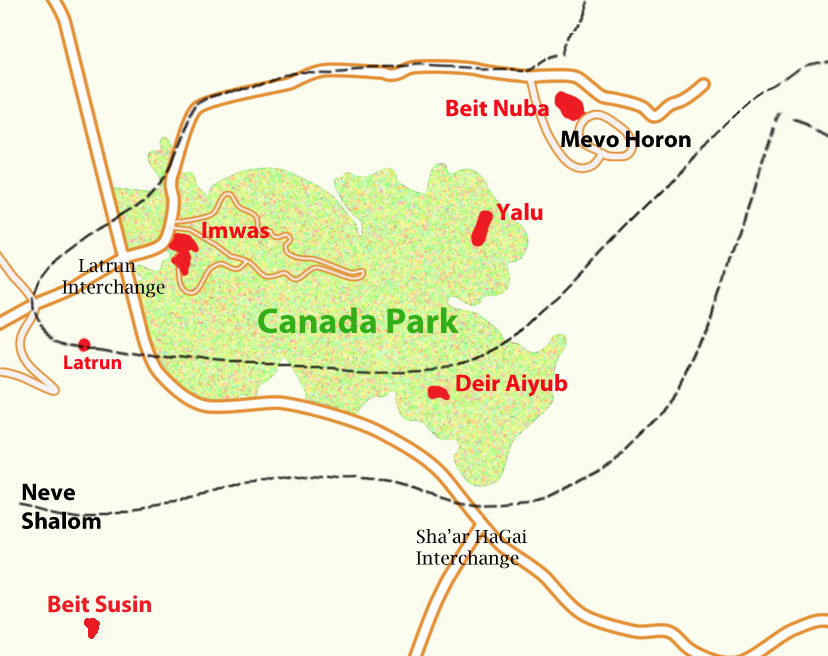
Map of Canada Park

In 1967, after the Six-Day War the residents of Imwas Israeli forces expelled the population and the village was razed by bulldozers, leaving the Byzantine-crusader church, called in Arabic, al-Kenisah, intact in their cemetery. The Catholic congregation, the Community of the Beatitudes, renovated the site in 1967–1970 and opened the French Center for the Study of the Prehistory of the Land of Israel next to it where they were allowed to settle in 1993.

Subsequently, Canada Park was created in 1973, financed by the Jewish National Fund (JNF) of Canada, and included the plantation of a forest on the rubble of Imwas. The site became a favourite picnic ground for Israelis and the Latrun salient an area of Israeli commemoration of its War of Independence.

==== Archaeology ====
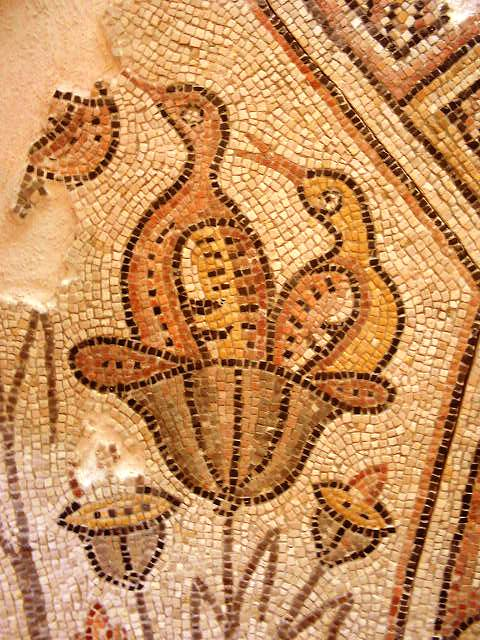
Byzantine mosaic from Emmaus Nicopolis

Archaeological excavations in Imwas started in the late 19th century and continue nowadays: Clermont-Ganneau (1874), J.-B. Guillemot (1883–1887), Dominican Fathers L.-H. Vincent & F.-M. Abel (1924–1930), Y. Hirschfeld (1975), M. Gichon (1978), Mikko Louhivuori, M. Piccirillo, V. Michel, K.-H. Fleckenstein (since 1994). During excavations in Canada Park (Ayalon forest) ruins of Emmaus fortifications from the Hasmonean era were discovered, along with a Roman bathhouse from the 3rd century CE, Jewish burial caves from the 1st century CE, Roman-Byzantine hydraulic installations, oil presses and tombs. Other findings were coins, oil lamps, vessels, jewellery. The eastern (rear) three-apsidal wall of the Byzantine church was cleared, with an external baptistery and polychrome mosaics, as well as walls of the Crusader church which were built against the central Byzantine apse (12th century). In the area of Emmaus, several Hebrew, Samaritan, Greek and Latin inscriptions carved on stones have been found.

==== Identification with the Gospel site ====
Most manuscripts of the Gospel of Luke which came down to us indicate the distance of 60 stadia (c. 11 km) between Jerusalem and Emmaus. However, there are several manuscripts which state the distance as 160 stadia (31 km). These include the uncial manuscripts א (Codex Sinaiticus), Θ, Ν, Κ, Π, 079 and cursive (minuscule) manuscripts 158, 175, 223, 237, 420, as well as ancient lectionaries and translations into Latin (some manuscripts of the Vetus Latina, high-quality manuscripts of the Vulgate), in Aramaic, Georgian and Armenian languages. The version of 60 stadia has been adopted for the printed editions of the Gospel of Luke since the 16th century. The main argument against the version of 160 stadia claims that it is impossible to walk such a distance in one day. In keeping with the principle of Lectio difficilior, lectio verior, the most difficult version is presumed to be genuine, since ancient copyists of the Bible were inclined to change the text in order to facilitate understanding, but not vice versa. It is possible to walk from Jerusalem to Emmaus and back in one day.

The ancient Jewish sources (1 Maccabees, Josephus Flavius, Talmud and Midrash) mention only one village called Emmaus in the area of Jerusalem: Emmaus of Ajalon Valley. For example, in the "Jewish War" (4, 8, 1) Josephus Flavius mentions that Vespasian placed the 5th Macedonian Legion in Emmaus. This has been confirmed by archaeologists who have discovered inscribed tombstones of the Legion's soldiers in the area of Emmaus. (The village of Motza, located 30 stadia (c. 4 mi or 6 km) away from Jerusalem, is mentioned in medieval Greek manuscripts of the "Jewish war" of Josephus Flavius (7,6,6) under the name of Ammaus, apparently as a result of copyists' mistake).

The ancient Christian tradition of the Church Fathers, as well as pilgrims to the Holy Land during the Roman-Byzantine period, unanimously recognized Nicopolis as the Emmaus in the Gospel of Luke (Origen (presumably), Eusebius of Caesarea, St. Jerome, Hesychius of Jerusalem, Theophanes the Confessor, Sozomen, Theodosius, etc.).

=== Al-Qubeiba/Castellum Emmaus/Chubebe/Qubaibat ===
Another possibility is the village of al-Qubeiba, west of Nabi Samwil on the Beit Horon road northwest of Jerusalem. The town, meaning "little domes" in Arabic, is located at about 65 stadia from Jerusalem. A Roman fort subsequently named Castellum Emmaus (from the Latin root castra, meaning encampment) was discovered at the site in 1099 by the Crusaders. However, there is no source from the Roman, Byzantine or Early Muslim periods naming it as "Emmaus" for the time of Jesus. Whether Josephus (who puts Emmaus at a distance of thirty stadia from Jerusalem) was referring to this place is now uncertain. However, the Gospel of Luke speaks of 60 stadia (Luke 24:13), a distance very close to the actual 65 stadia to Qubeibeh.

In the 12th century, the Crusaders of the Kingdom of Jerusalem called the site "Small Mahomeria", in order to distinguish it from the "Large Mahomeria" near Ramallah. Sounding similar to "Mahommed", the term was used in medieval times to describe a place inhabited or used for prayer by Muslims. It was referred to as Qubaibat for the first time at the end of that same century by the writer Abu Shama, who writes in his Book of the Two Gardens about a Muslim prince falling into the hands of the Crusaders at this spot. The Franciscans built a church here in 1902, on the ruins of a Crusader basilica.

During the Second World War, British authorities held Franciscans of Italian and German nationality at Emmaus-Qubeibeh. While there, Bellarmino Bagatti conducted excavations from 1940 to 1944 which revealed artifacts from the Hellenistic, Roman, Byzantine, and Crusader periods. Inspired by Bagatti's work, Virgilio Canio Corbo also undertook some experimental explorations.

=== Abu-Ghosh/Kiryat Anavim ===
Abu Ghosh is located in the middle of the Kiryat Yearim Ridge Route between Nicopolis and Jerusalem, nine miles (83 stadia) from the capital. A former Minorite convent with a Gothic church was turned into a stable. Robinson dated it to the Crusader period and declared it "more perfectly preserved than any other ancient church in Palestine." Excavations carried out in 1944 supported the identification with Fontenoid, a site the Crusaders held for a while to be Emmaus before accepting Nicopolis as the "real" Emmaus.

=== Emmaus/Colonia/Motza/Ammassa/Ammaous/Khirbet Mizza ===
Colonia, between Abu Ghosh and Jerusalem on the Kiryat Yearim Ridge Route, is another possibility. At a distance of c. 8 km (5 mi) from Jerusalem, it was referred to as Mozah in the Old Testament (Joshua 18:26). Listed among the Benjamite cities of Joshua 18:26, it was referred to in the Talmud as a place where people would come to cut young willow branches as a part of the celebration of Sukkot (Mishnah, Sukkah 4.5: 178). Motza was identified as the Emmaus of Luke in 1881 by William F. Birch (1840–1916) of the Palestine Exploration Fund, and again in 1893 by Paulo Savi. One mile to the north of modern Motza is a ruin called Khirbet Beit Mizza, which was identified by some scholars as the biblical Mozah, until recent excavations placed Mozah at Khirbet Mizza (without "Beit"), as the ruins of Qalunya/Colonia are called in Arabic.

Excavations in 2001–2003 headed by Professor Carsten Peter Thiede were cut short by his sudden death in 2004. Thiede was a strong proponent of Motza as the real Emmaus. He offered that the Latin Amassa and the Greek Ammaous are derived from the biblical Hebrew name Motza: Motza – ha-Motza ("ha" is the Hebrew equivalent of the definite article "the") – ha-Mosa – Amosa – Amaous – Emmaus. His excavation summaries were removed from the website of the Basel college he was teaching at, but a book and at least one article he published on the topic are available. He contended that neither Nicopolis, Abu Ghosh, or Al-Qubeiba can be considered because the first was located too far from Jerusalem, while the two others were not called Emmaus at the time of Jesus.

Josephus Flavius writes in Antiquities of the Jews about a city called Emmaus in the context of the Maccabean Revolt, which corresponds well with the large city later called Emmaus Nicopolis, located at over 170 Roman stadia from Jerusalem, while in The Jewish War he brings up another Emmaus, just 30 Roman stadia from Jerusalem, where Vespasian settled 800 Roman legionnaires after the First Jewish Revolt. The ancient Latin manuscripts use "Amassa", while the medieval Greek manuscripts use "Ammaous". The newly created Roman "colonia" soon made the old name disappear: even the Jewish works of the 3rd-5th centuries, the Mishnah, the Babylonian and the Jerusalem Talmud, talk about "Qeloniya", an Aramaic distortion of "colonia". This name survived into modern times in Arabic as "Qalunya". This was indeed always a village, not a city like Emmaus Nicopolis, and thus fits the description by Luke (κωμη "village") much better than the latter. The difference in distance to Jerusalem between Luke's and Josephus' Emmaus, 60 vs. 30 stadia, is still much smaller than the one to Nicopolis, which lays fully 176 stadia down the Roman road from Jerusalem. Thiede recalculated the actual distance between Jerusalem's western city gate at the time, and his excavation site at Motza which unearthed the Jewish village that predated the Roman veterans colony, and came up with a figure of 46 stadia. That would put it squarely in the middle between Luke's and Josephus' stated distances, which Thiede considers a good approximation for the time. Thiede's excavation produced Jewish artifacts of the time preceding the fall of Jerusalem in 70 CE, giving substance to his claim to have found Luke's Emmaus, which had necessarily to be settled by Jews. With no other Emmaus in the vicinity of Jerusalem, Motza was thus the only credible candidate.

=== Horvat 'Eqed ===
Horvat 'Eqed, situated on a hilltop 2 km (1.2 mi) east of Emmaus Nicopolis, is a recent candidate for the site of ancient Emmaus. This archaeological site features significant fortifications dating back to the second century BC, potentially attributed to the Seleucid general Bacchides and reinforced during the Bar Kokhba revolt, in the early 2nd century AD. Discoveries at the site include ritual baths, a hiding system used during the revolt, as well as various artifacts like Bar Kokhba coinage and weaponry.

According to one theory, Emmaus was originally located at Horvat 'Eqed during the Hellenistic and early Roman periods, and was later abandoned in the aftermath of the Bar Kokhba revolt. The name Emmaus later transferred to the site of Emmaus Nicopolis, where the city was located in the Roman and Byzantine periods.

== Possible symbolic identification ==
One of the oldest extant versions of the Gospel of Luke, preserved in the Codex Bezae, reads "Oulammaus" instead of Emmaus. In Septuagint, the Greek translation of the Old Testament scriptures, Oulammaus was the place where Jacob was visited by God in his dream, while sleeping on a rock. However, Oulammaus was not a real place name but a translation mistake. The original name in Hebrew was "Luz". This mistake was later corrected, but was still there at the time when the Gospel was written around AD 100. Thus, a theory has been put forward that the story in the Gospel was merely symbolic, drawing a parallel between Jacob being visited by God and the disciples being visited by Jesus.

== Contemporary use ==
Emmaus, Pennsylvania, a township in the Lehigh Valley region of the United States, draws its name from the Biblical references to Emmaus.

== Notable residents ==
- Rabbi Akiva

== See also ==
- Aelia Capitolina
- Battle of Emmaus
- Caesarea Maritima
- Emmaus (charity)
- Gezer
- Horvat 'Eqed
- Imwas
- Post-resurrection appearances of Jesus

== Bibliography ==
- Duvignau, P. 1937. Emmaüs, le site – le mystère, Paris,
- Fleckenstein, K.-H., M. Louhivuori, R. Riesner, "Emmaus in Judäa", Giessen-Basel, 2003.ISBN 3-7655-9811-9.
- Lagrange, Marie-Joseph (1921). Evangile selon Saint Luc. Paris: Libraire Victor Lecoffre.
- Michel, V., "Le complexe ecclésiastique d'Emmaüs-Nicopolis", Paris, Sorbonne,1996–1997, pro manuscripto.
- Robinson, Edward; Smith, Eli (1841). Biblical Researches in Palestine, Mount Sinai and Arabia Petraea: A Journal of Travels in the year 1838. Vol. 2. Boston: Crocker & Brewster.
- Robinson, Edward; Smith, Eli (1856). Later Biblical Researches in Palestine and adjacent regions: A Journal of Travels in the year 1852. London: John Murray.
- Schlatter, A. (1896). "Einige Ergebnisse aus Niese's Ausgabe des Josephus". Zeitschrift des Deutschen Palästina-Vereins. 19: 221–231.
- Segev, Tom (2007). 1967: Israel, the War, and the Year that Transformed the Middle East. Translated by Jessica Cohen. Macmillan. ISBN 978-0-8050-7057-6.
- Sharon, Moshe (1997). Corpus Inscriptionum Arabicarum Palaestinae, A. Vol. 1. BRILL. ISBN 90-04-10833-5.
- Vincent, Louis-Hugues; Abel, Félix-Marie (1932). Emmaüs, Sa Basilique Et Son Histoire (in French). Vol. 1. Paris.
