= Great Passion (Dürer) =

Woodcut series by Albrecht Dürer

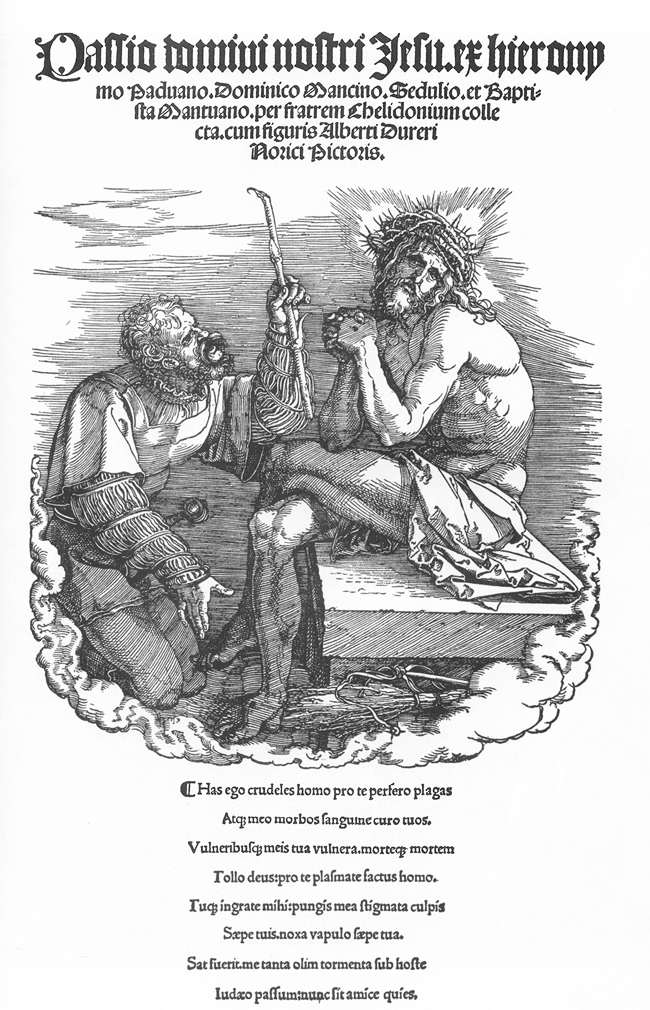
Frontispiece

Great Passion is a 1497–1510 series of eleven woodcuts plus a frontispiece by Albrecht Dürer. Its title distinguishes it from his later Small Passion. One of the best surviving sets is now in the Albertina in Vienna.

== History ==
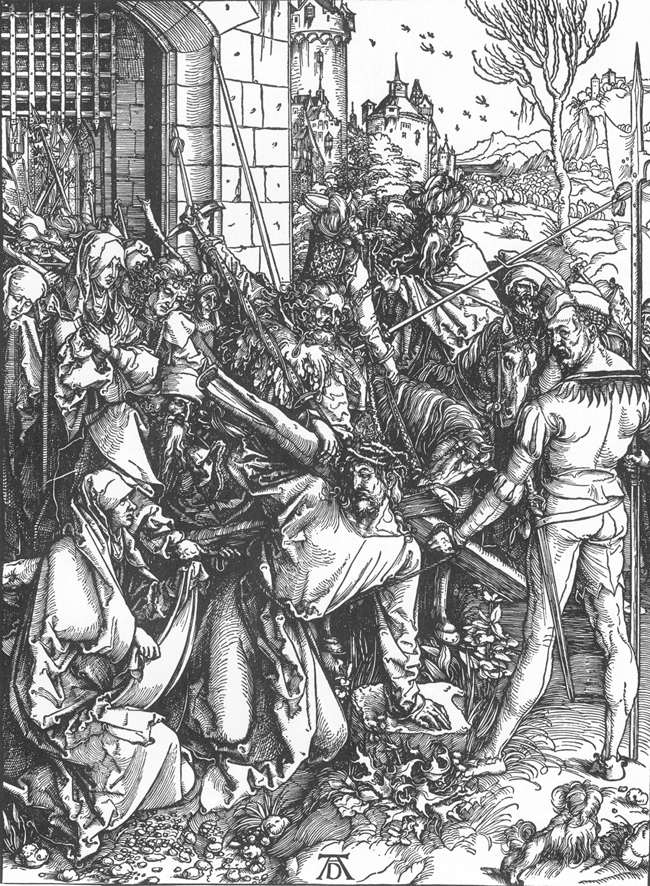
Christ Carries his Cross

At first, after settling in Nuremberg, Dürer only produced prints, a far more guaranteed income stream than chasing commissions for paintings. Around 1497 he began to plan an ambitious and in many ways innovative plan to produce an illustrated edition of the Passion of Jesus, which he worked on in parallel with his Apocalypse. He not only produced the preparatory drawings for the work but also the woodblocks for printing the images and text. As with Apocalypse, the illustrations were full-page works in recto, followed by the text of the relevant Biblical verses, telling the same scene in image and words without the reader having to compare each illustration with its corresponding passage.

He drew on both local and foreign artistic influences, including Raphael's Christ Falling on the Way to Calvary. The stand-out print from his first phase of work on Passion is Christ Bearing his Cross - its crowd and Christ uniting two themes from copperplate engravings by Martin Schongauer and accentuating their Late Gothic style whilst the musculature of the soldier on the right also draws on the contemporary study of anatomy which Dürer would have seen in Italian Renaissance works in Venice. These two influences are merged in an idiosyncratic but naturalistic style, making the best use of the bold black-white contrast inherent in woodcutting, giving volume to the figures through parallel hatching, already used for copperplate engravings at that time. The synthesis intensifies as the work goes on, merging the visionary nature of the events with a classical naturalism and monumentality in the figures.

The full set was only completed with its last four plates and the frontispiece in 1510, appearing as a book with a Latin text. In the meantime, Dürer had had to release individual prints from the set, thus (combined with its less sensational and fantastical nature than Apocalypse) lessening the final work's impact and success.

== List ==
1. Frontispiece (1510)
2. Last Supper (1510)
3. Agony in the Garden (around 1497)
4. Christ Arrested (1510)
5. Flagellation of Christ (around 1497)
6. Ecce Homo (1499 circa)
7. Christ Carries his Cross (1498)
8. Crucifixion (1498)
9. Lamentation (around 1497)
10. Burial of Christ (around 1497)
11. Christ Descends into Limbo (1510)
12. Resurrection of Christ (1510)

== Gallery ==
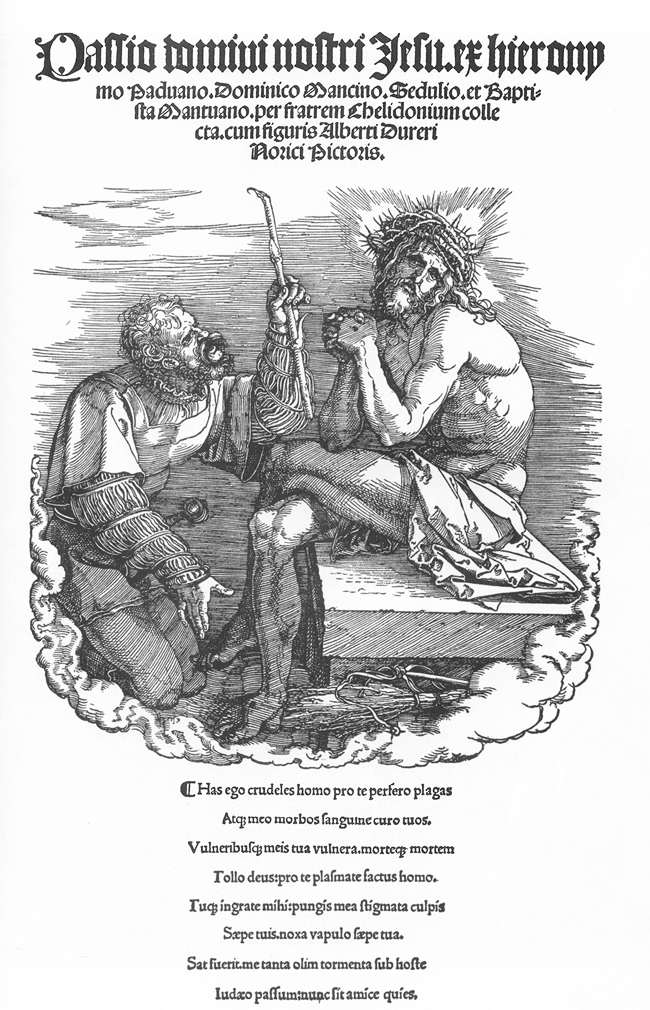
Frontispiece

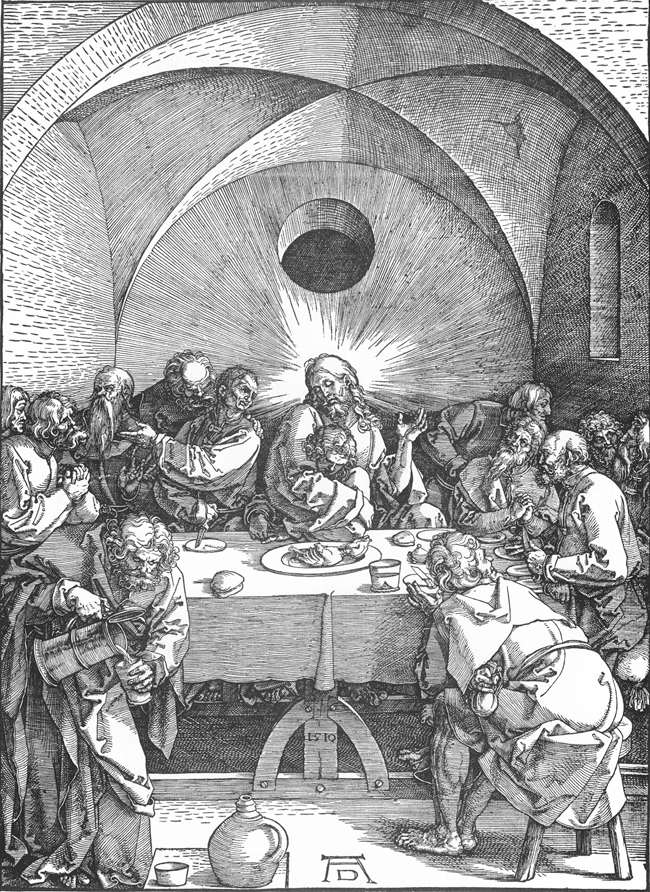
Last Supper

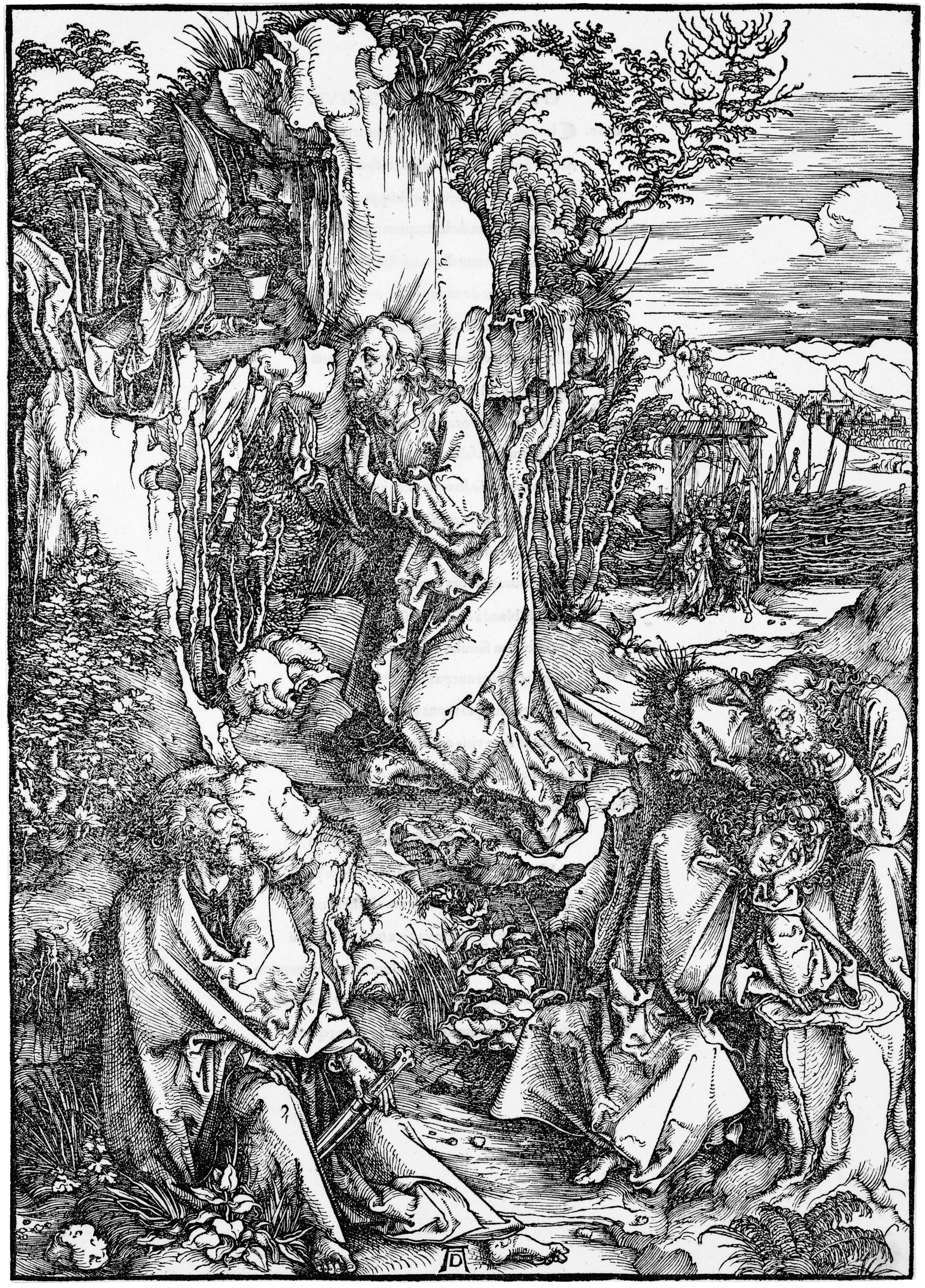
Agony in the Garden

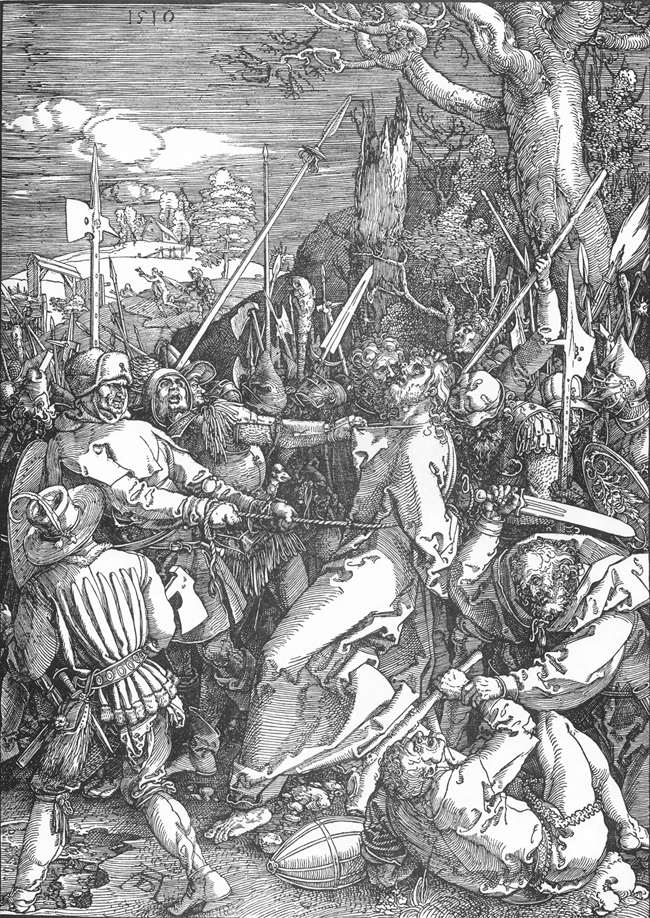
Christ Arrested

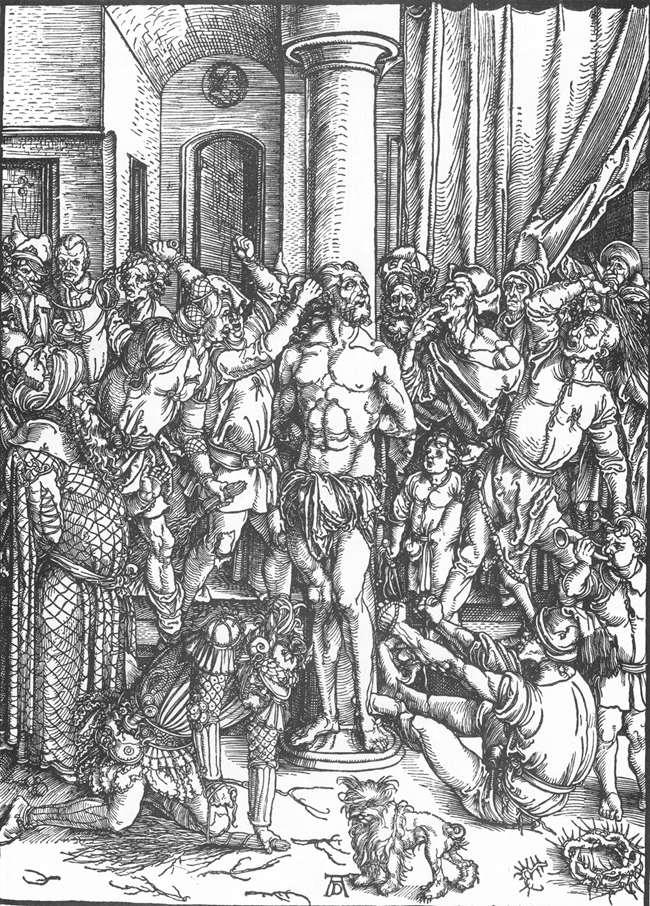
Flagellation of Christ

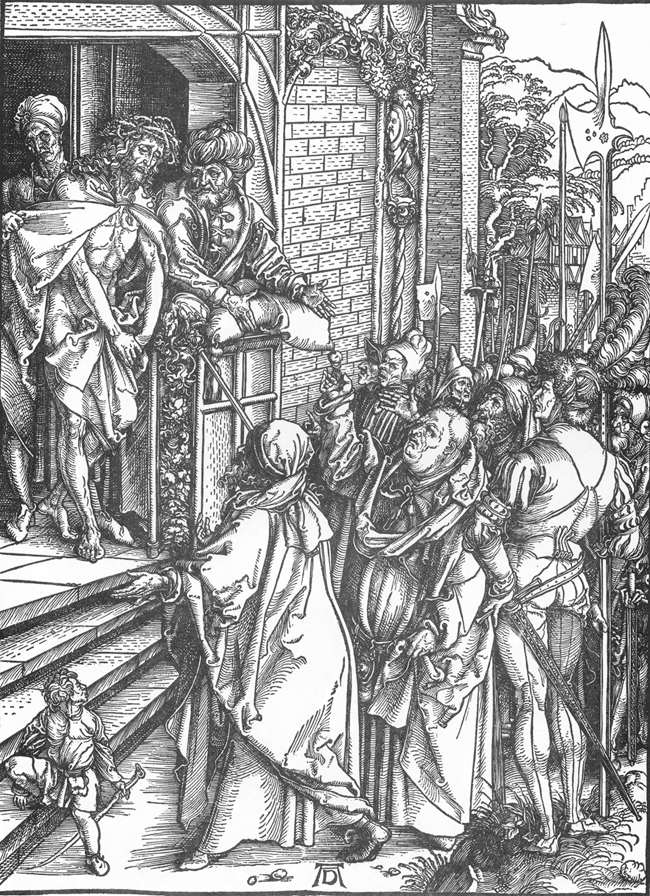
Ecce Homo

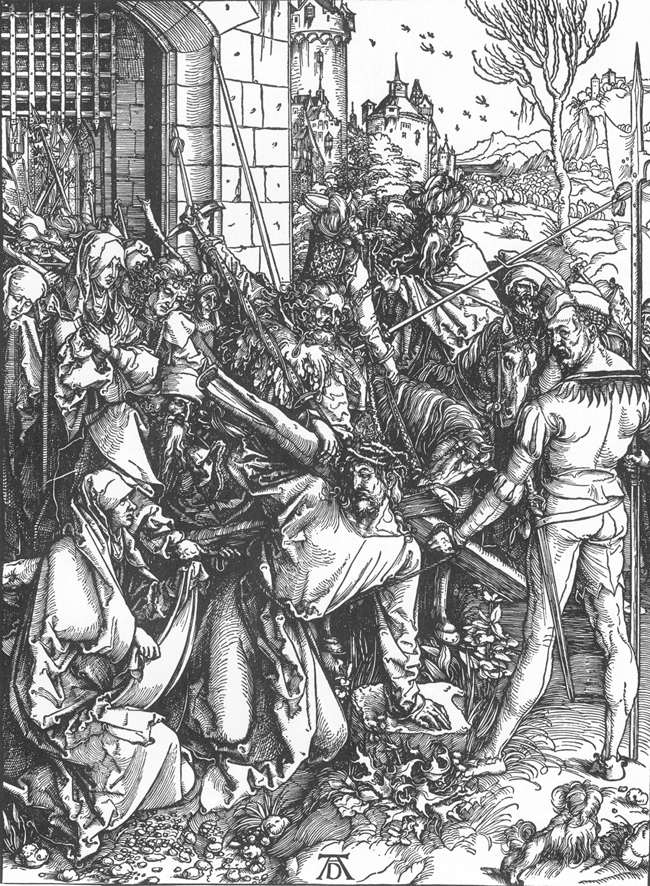
Christ Carries his Cross

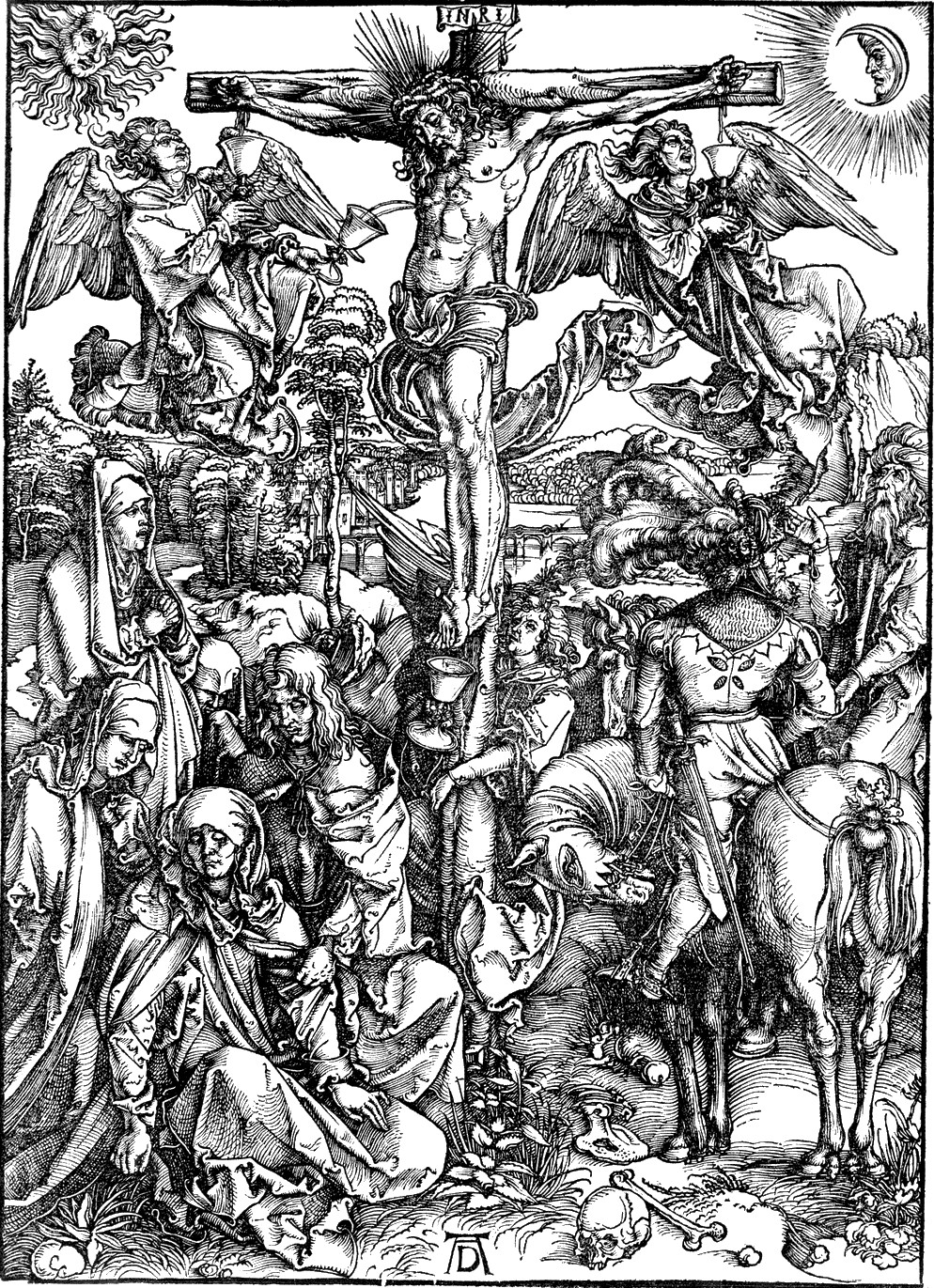
Crucifixion

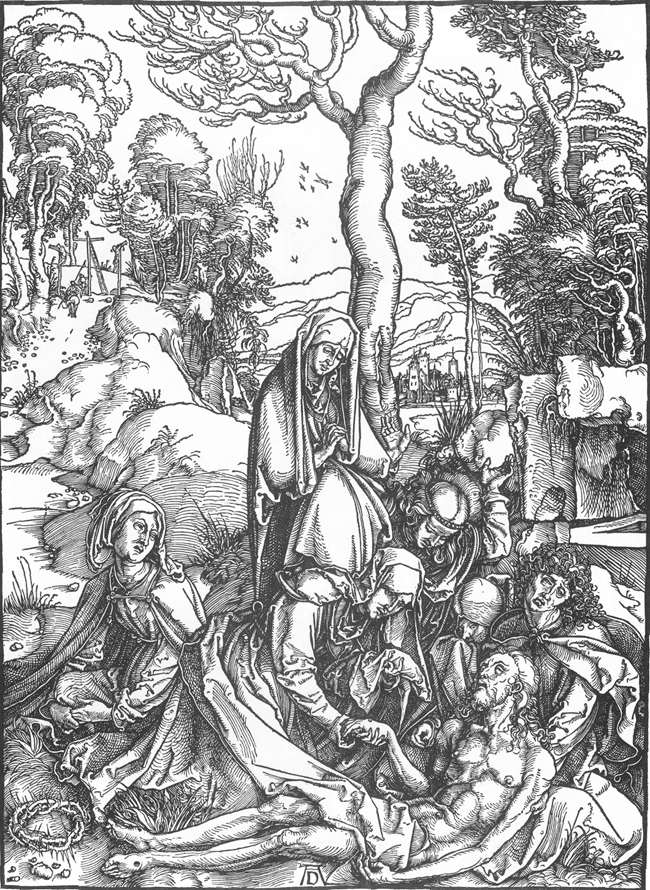
Lamentation

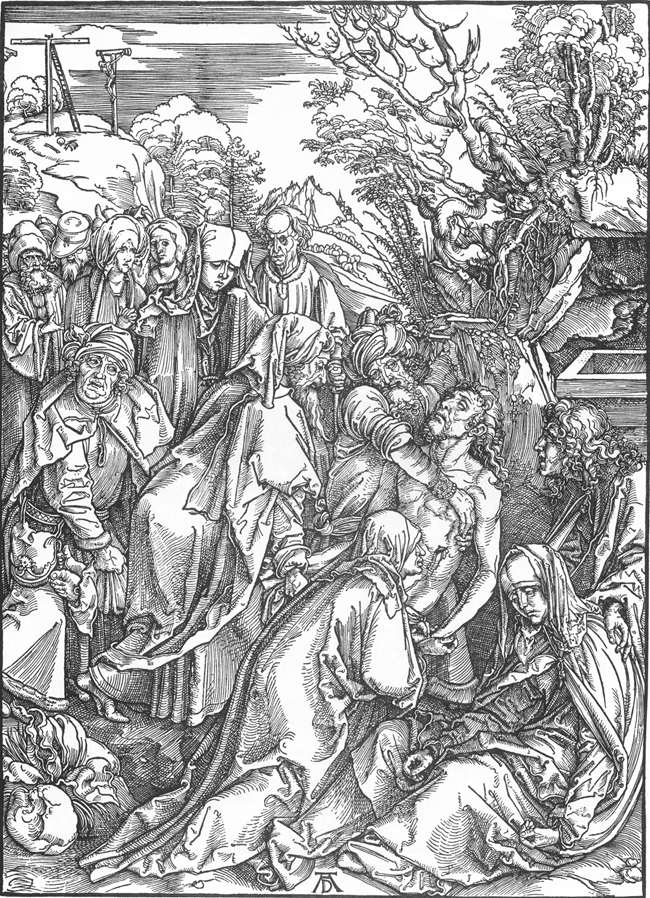
Burial of Christ

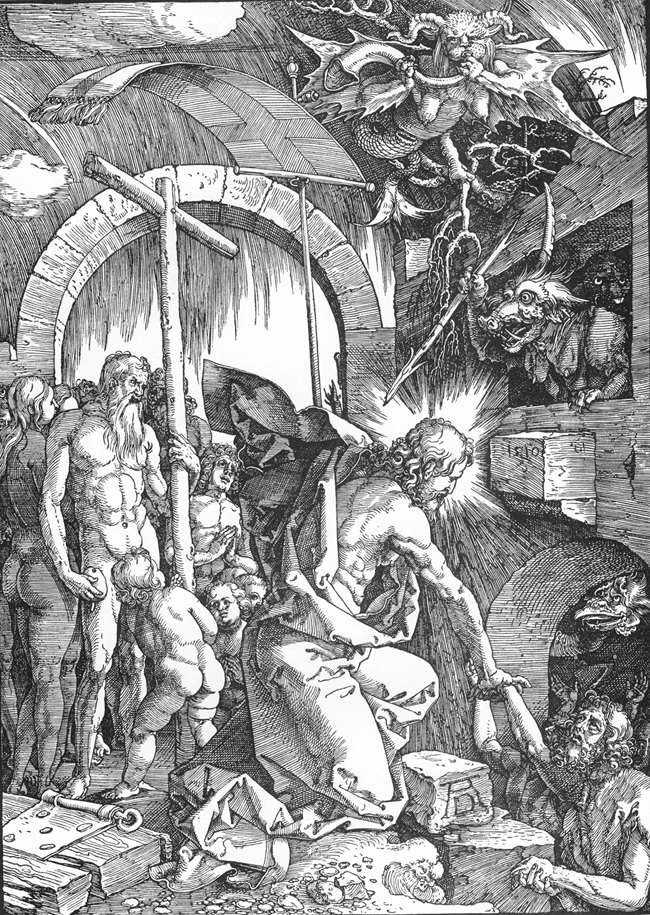
Christ Descends into Limbo

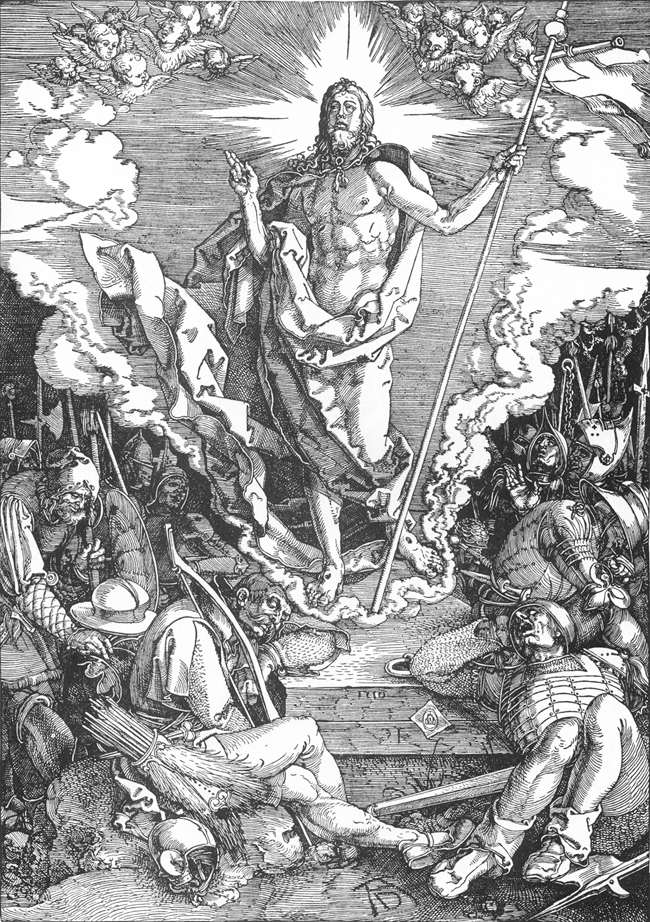
Resurrection of Christ

== See also ==
- List of engravings by Albrecht Dürer
- List of woodcuts by Albrecht Dürer
