= Emmaus, U.S. Virgin Islands =

Coordinates: 18°20′53″N 64°43′04″W

Emmaus is a settlement on the island of Saint John in the United States Virgin Islands.
