= Emmaus College =

Emmaus College may refer to:

== Australia ==
- Emmaus College, Melbourne a Roman Catholic secondary day school in Forest Hill, Melbourne, Victoria, Australia
- Emmaus College, Rockhampton, a Roman Catholic secondary day school in Park Avenue, Rockhampton, Queensland, Australia
- Emmaus Bible College (Australia) a Bible College located in a suburb of Sydney, New South Wales

== United States ==
- Emmaus High School, a public high school in Emmaus, Pennsylvania, U.S.
- Emmaus University, formerly Emmaus Bible College (Iowa), a private university in Dubuque, Iowa, U.S.
