= Small Passion =

Woodcut series by Albrecht Dürer

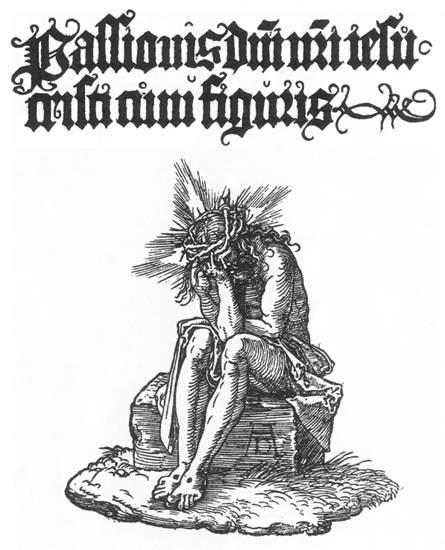
Title page

Small Passion is a series of 36 woodcuts and a frontispiece by Albrecht Dürer. One of the best surviving sets is now in the British Museum in London. It was produced in 1511 as a new set of works on Biblical themes and the life and Passion of Christ (its title distinguishes it from his earlier Great Passion) in 1511, the same year as he republished earlier works such as Apocalypse.

== List ==
1. Frontispiece
2. Fall of Man
3. Adam and Eve Expelled from Paradise
4. Annunciation
5. Nativity of Jesus
6. Christ Bids Farewell to his Mother
7. Christ Enters Jerusalem
8. Christ Drives the Merchants from the Temple
9. Last Supper
10. Christ Washes the Disciples' Feet
11. Agony in the Garden
12. Christ Arrested
13. Christ Before Ananias
14. Christ Before Caiphas
15. Christ Mocked
16. Christ Before Pilate
17. Christ Before Herod
18. Flagellation
19. Christ Crowned with Thorns
20. Ecce homo
21. Pilate Washes his Hands
22. Christ Carries his Cross
23. Veronica and the Sudarium
24. Christ Nailed to the Cross
25. Crucifixion
26. Christ Descends into Limbo
27. Christ Taken Down from the Cross
28. Lamentation
29. Burial of Christ
30. Resurrection of Christ
31. Christ Appears to his Mother
32. Noli me tangere
33. Supper at Emmaus
34. Incredulity of Saint Thomas
35. Ascension
36. Pentecost
37. Last Judgement

== Gallery ==
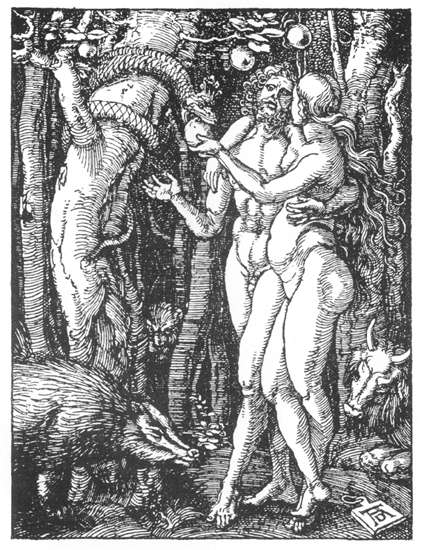
Fall of man

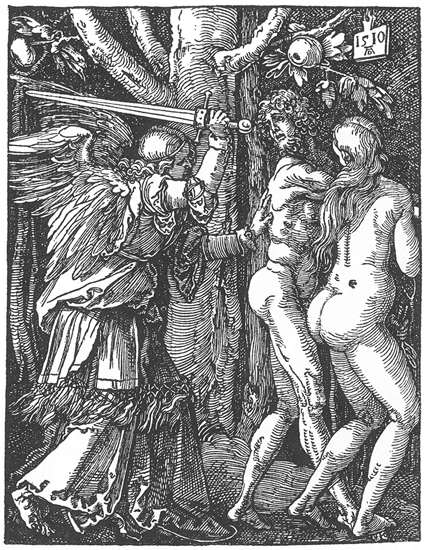
Adam and Eve Expelled from Paradise

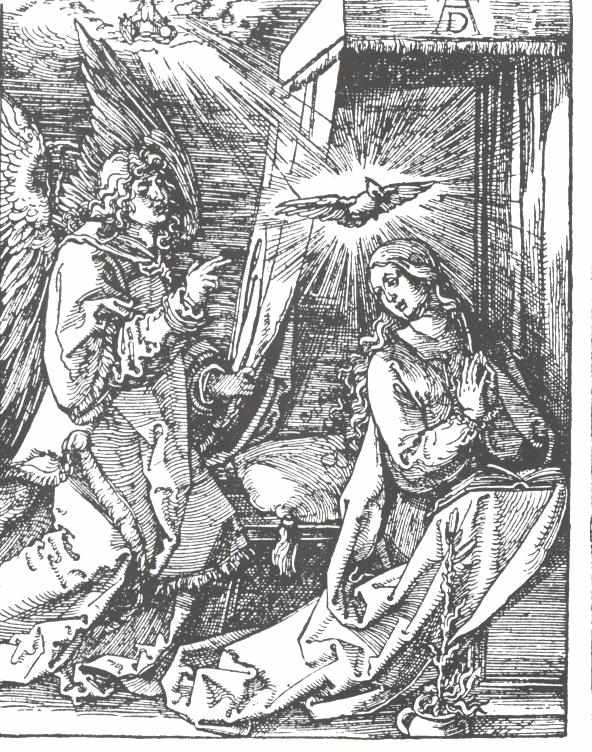
Annunciation

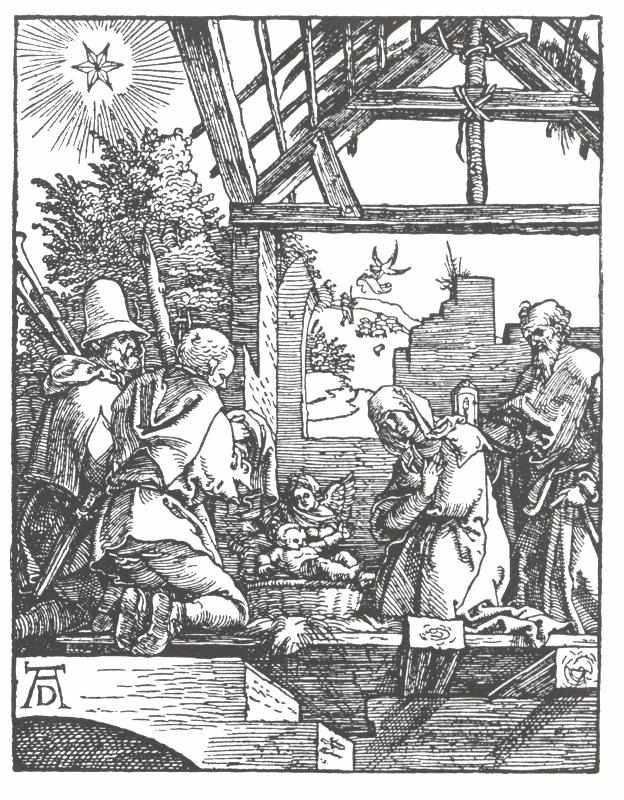
Nativity

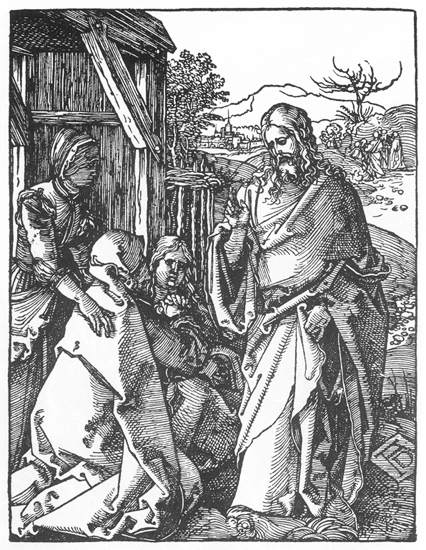
Christ Bids Farewell to his Mother

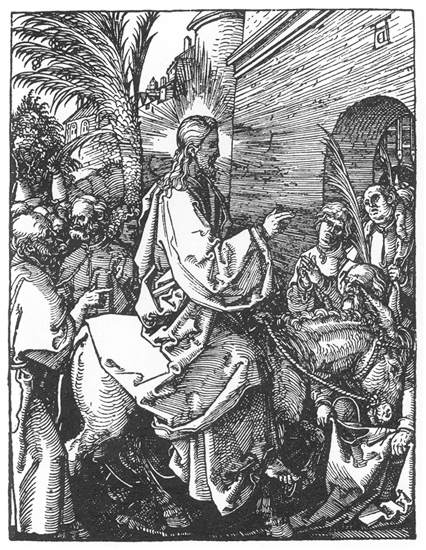
Christ Enters Jerusalem

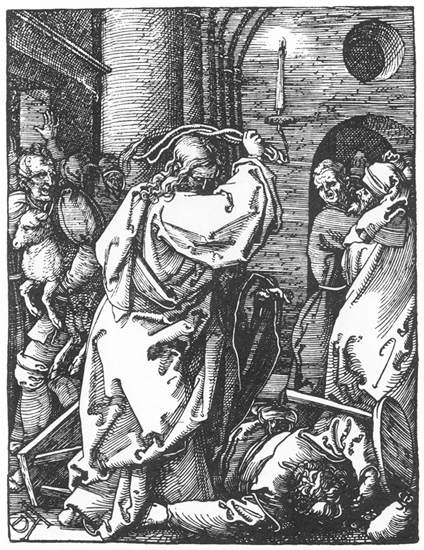
Christ Drives the Merchants from the Temple

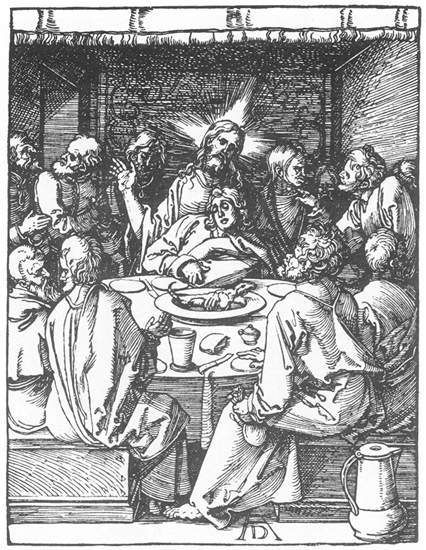
Last Supper

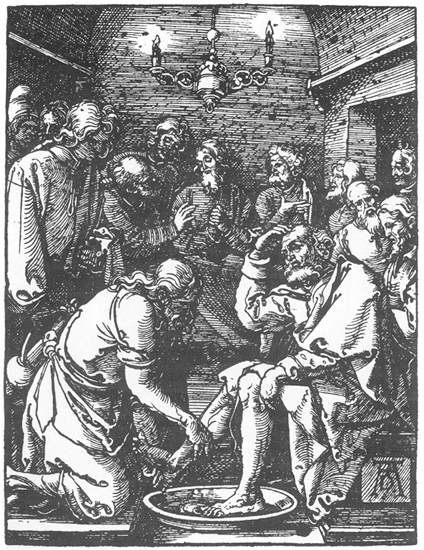
Christ Washes the Disciples' Feet

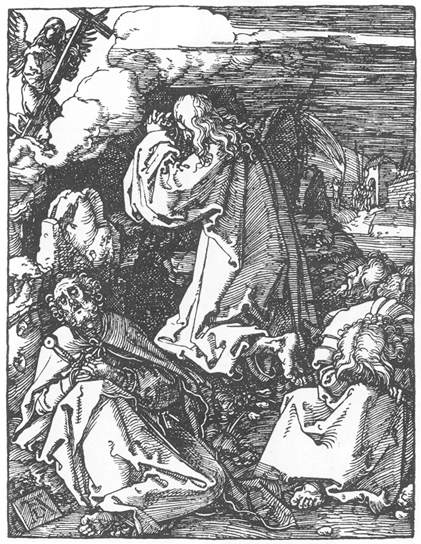
Agony in the Garden

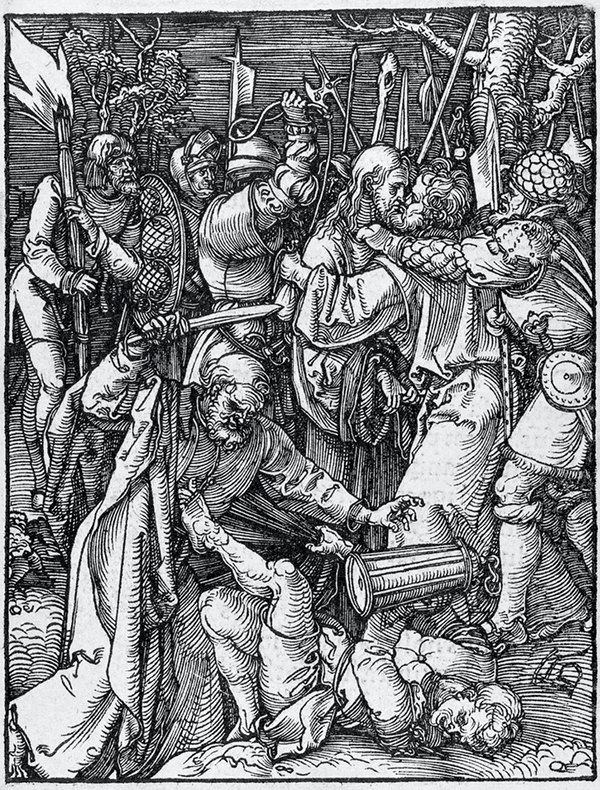
Christ Arrested

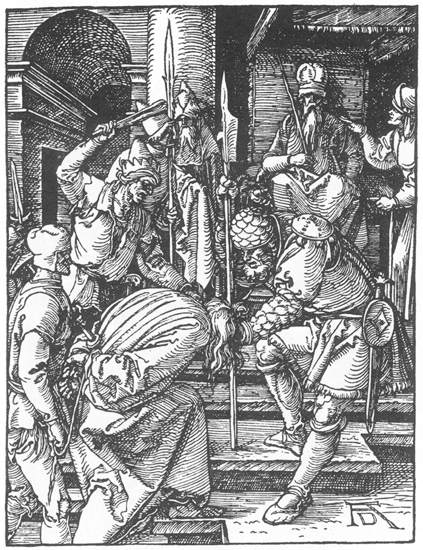
Christ Before Ananias

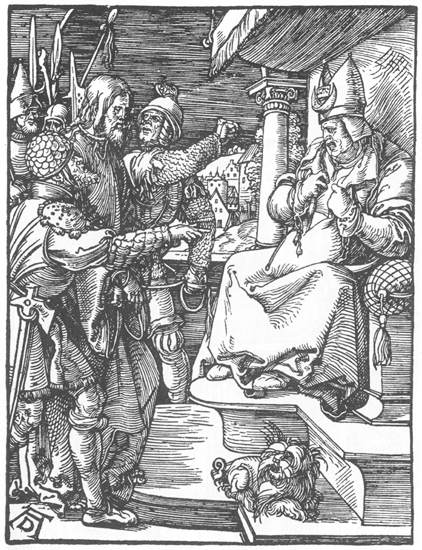
Christ Before Caiaphas

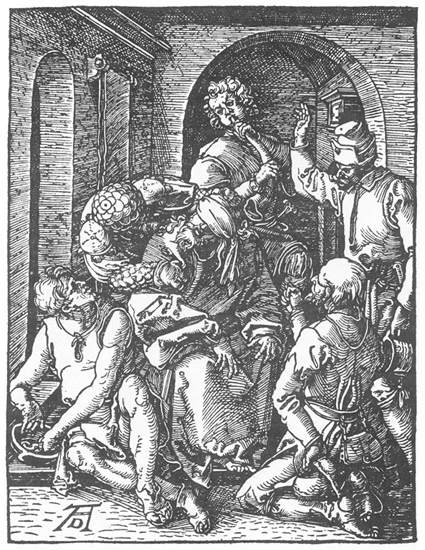
Christ Mocked

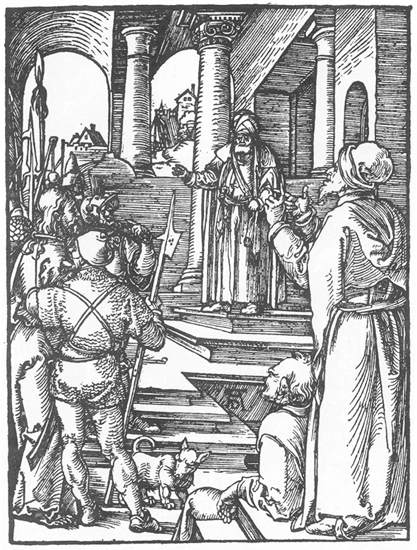
Christ Before Pilate

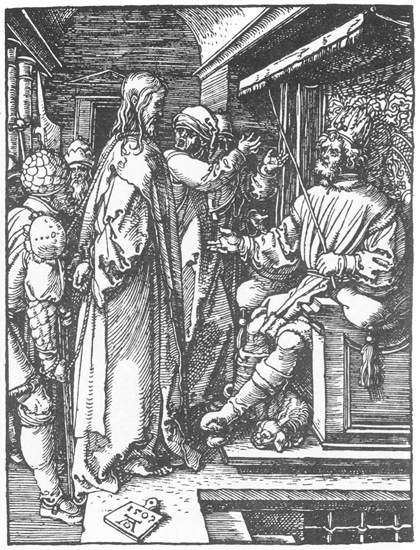
Christ Before Herod

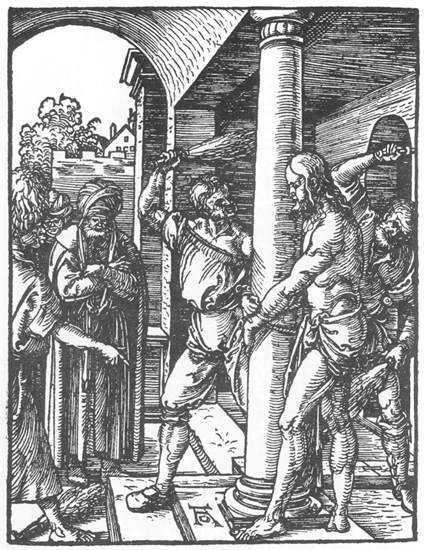
Flagellation

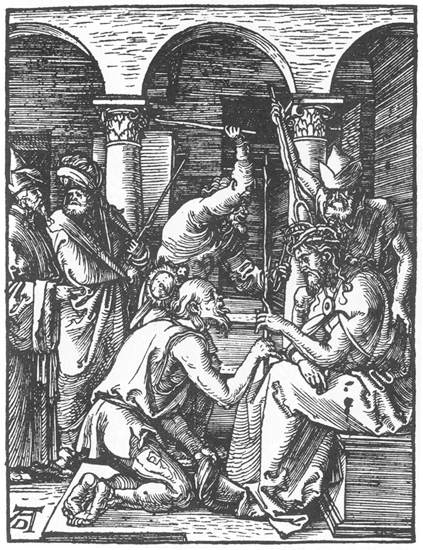
Christ Crowned with Thorns

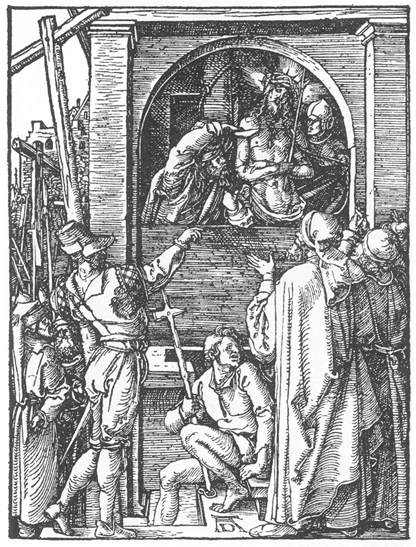
Ecce homo

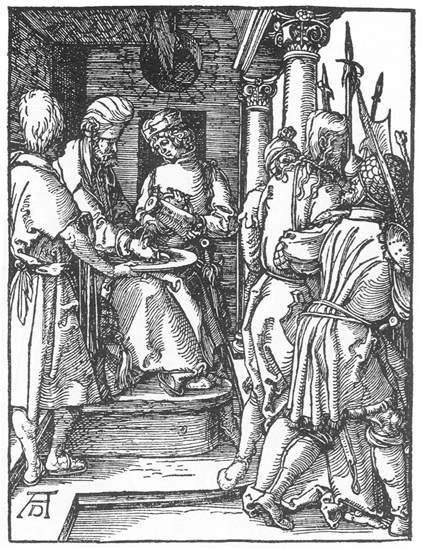
Pilate Washes his Hands

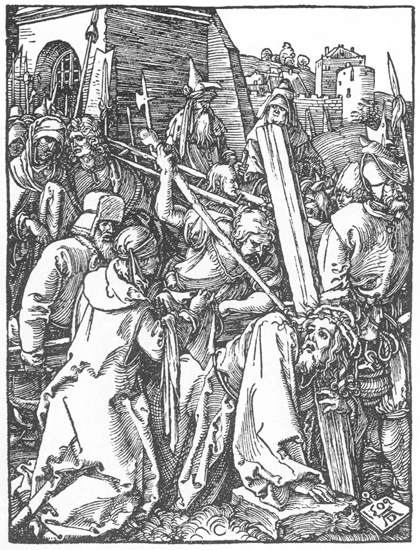
Christ Carries his Cross

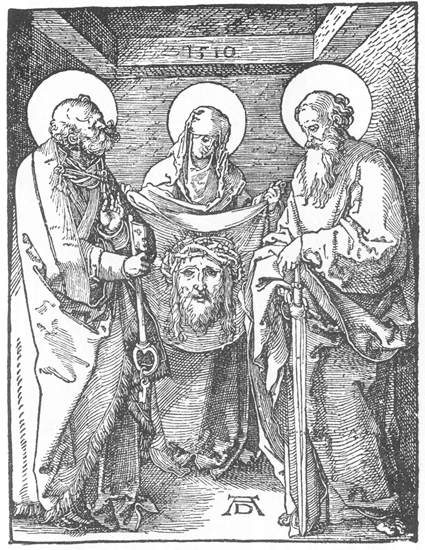
Veronica and the Sudarium

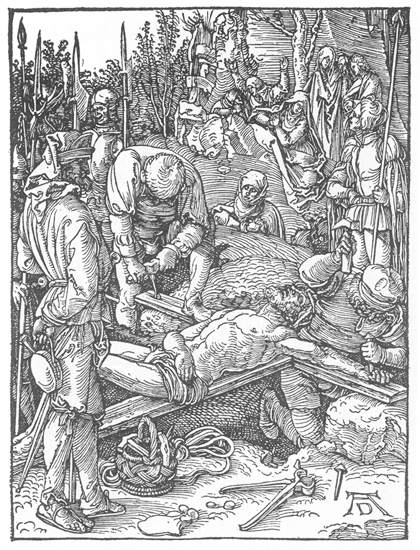
Christ Nailed to the Cross

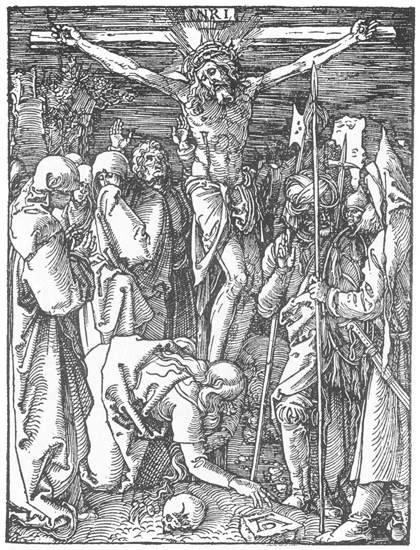
Crucifixion

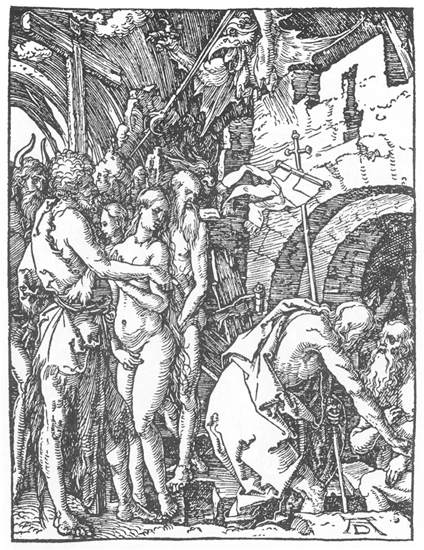
Christ Descends into Limbo

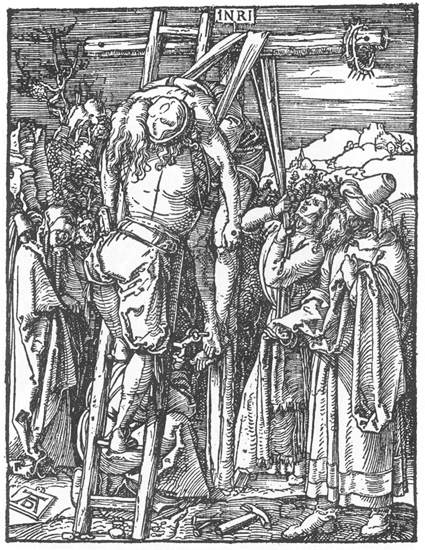
Christ Taken Down from the Cross

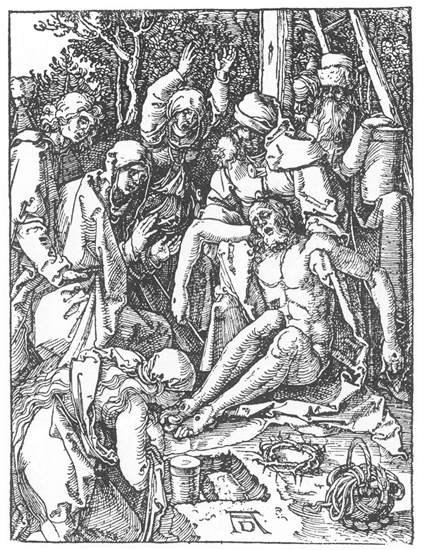
Lamentation

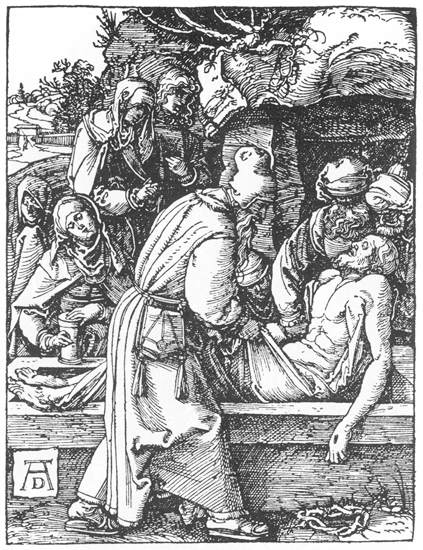
Burial of Christ

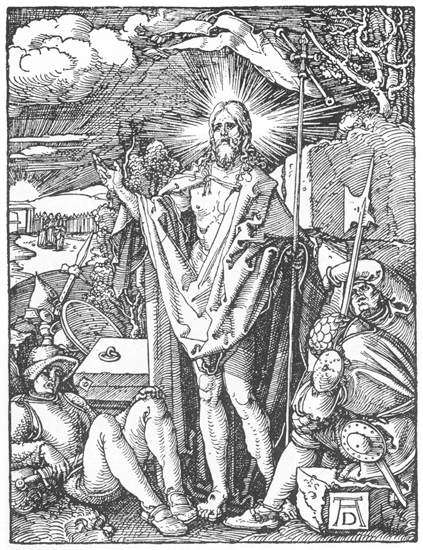
Resurrection of Christ

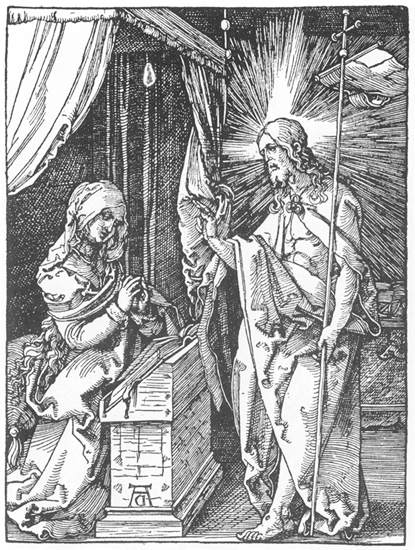
Christ Appears to his Mother

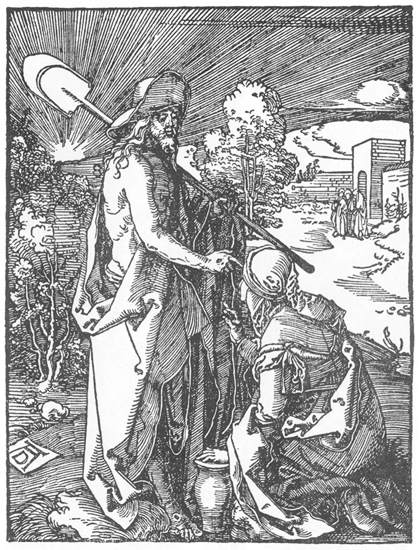
Noli me tangere

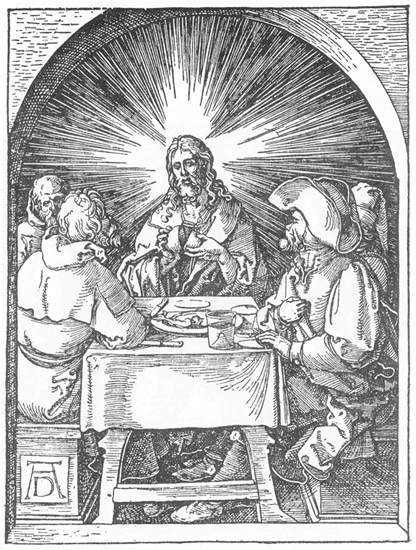
Supper at Emmaus

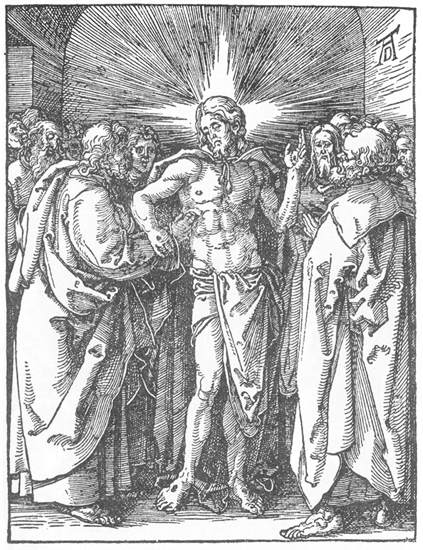
Incredulity of Saint Thomas

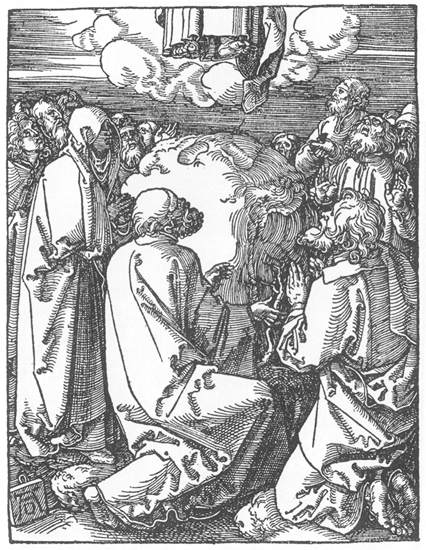
Ascension

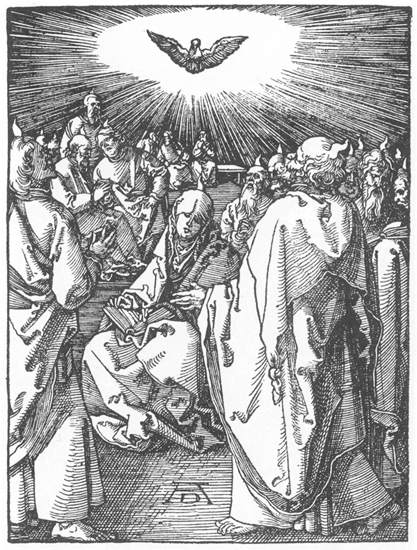
Pentecost

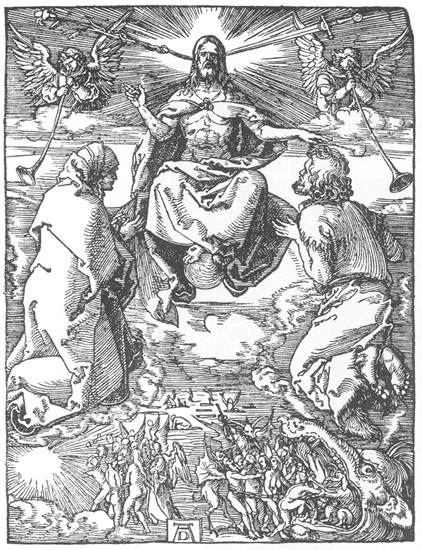
Last Judgement

== See also ==
- List of engravings by Albrecht Dürer
- List of woodcuts by Albrecht Dürer

== Bibliography ==
- Hans Philipp Hoff: Die Passionsdarstellungen Albrecht Dürers, Heidelberg 1898, https://doi.org/10.11588/diglit.62412
- Rudolf Berliner: Zu Dürers Kleiner Passion, in: Die christliche Kunst. Monatsschrift für alle Gebiete der christlichen Kunst und der Kunstwissenschaft sowie für das gesamte Kunstleben, vol. 25, 1928/1929, pp. 314-318, https://doi.org/10.11588/diglit.59007#0348
- Angela Hass: Two Devotional Manuals by Albrecht Dürer. The "Small Passion" and the "Engraved Passion". Iconography, Context and Spirituality, in: Zeitschrift für Kunstgeschichte, vol. 63, n. 2, 2000, pp. 169-230.
- Erich Schneider: "Von Pontius zu Pilatus laufen". Beobachtungen zu Dürers Kleiner Holzschnittpassion, in: Uwe Müüler/Georg Drescher/Ernst Petersen (Eds.): 50 Jahre Sammler und Mäzen. Der Historische Verein Schweinfurt seinem Ehrenmitglied Dr. phil. h.c. Otto Schäfer (1912 - 2000) zum Gedenken, Schweinfurt 2001, pp. 299-337.
- Jeffrey Chips Smith: Humanizing the Passion. Dürer's Pictorial Exegesis, in: Johann Anselm Steiger (ed.): Das Gebet in den Konfessionen und Medien der Frühen Neuzeit, Leipzig 2018 [= Theologie - Kultur - Hermeneutik; vol. 25], pp. 57-91.
- Sabine Siemer: Die Passionsdarstellungen von Albrecht Dürer. Theologie und Rezeptionsästhetik, Heidelberg 2023, https://doi.org/10.11588/arthistoricum.1099
- (in Italian) Costantino Porcu (ed.), Dürer, Rizzoli, Milano 2004.
