= Supper at Emmaus (Rembrandt, Musée Jacquemart-André) =

Painting by Rembrandt

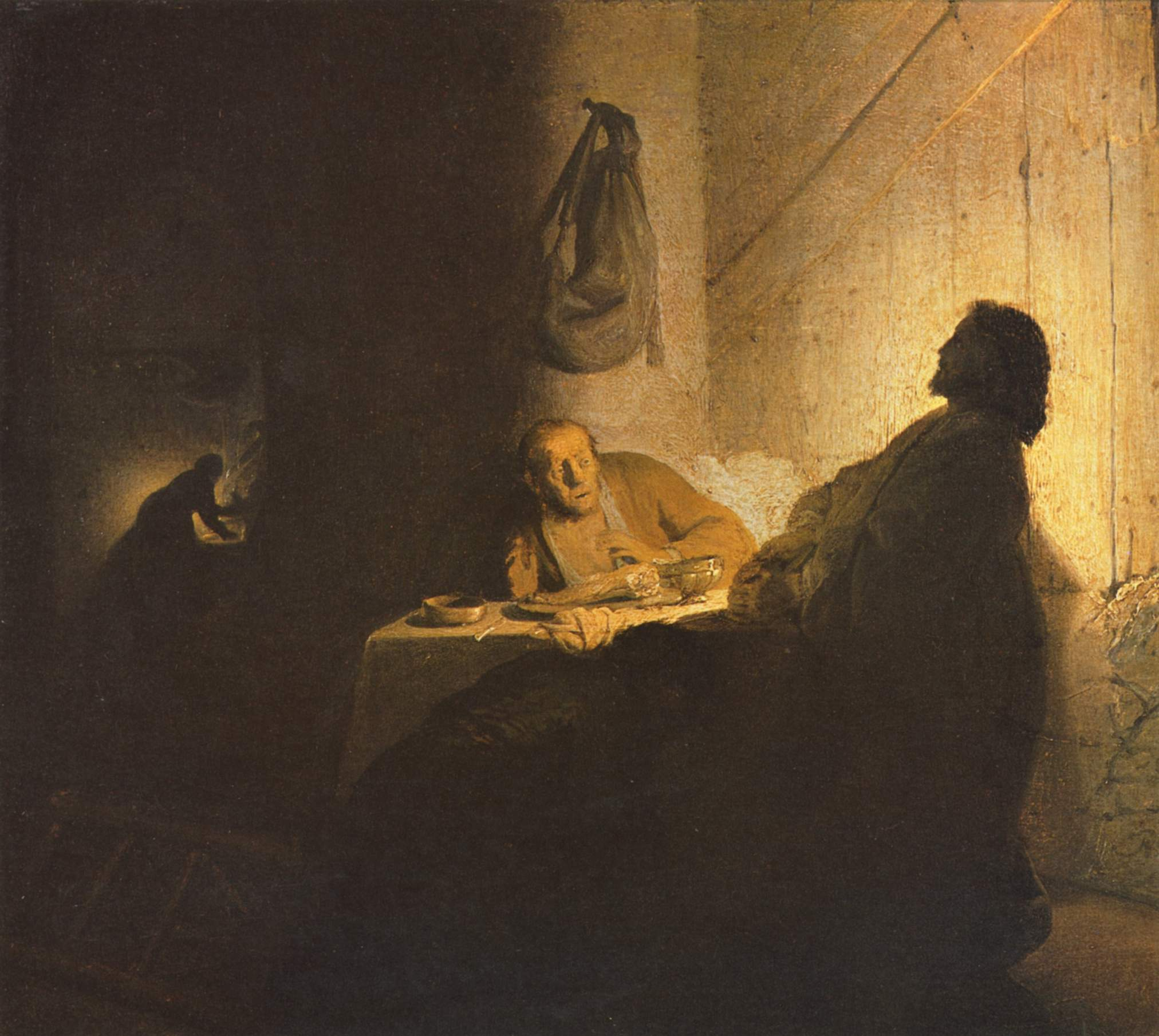

Supper at Emmaus or The Pilgrims at Emmaus is a c.1628 oil on panel painting by Rembrandt, now in the Musée Jacquemart-André in Paris
