= Road to Emmaus appearance =

Event from the Gospel of Luke

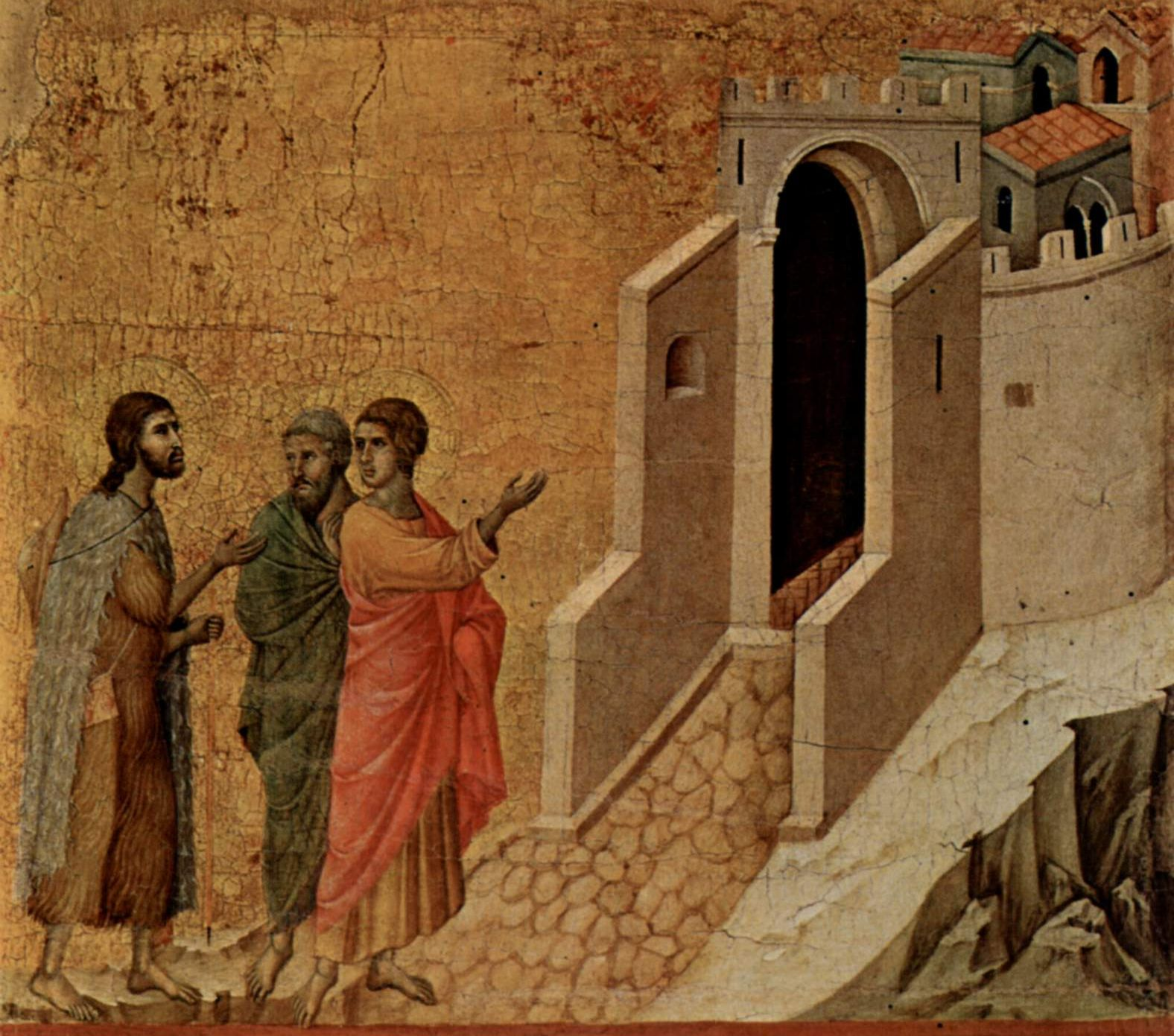
On the Road to Emmaus, an early 14th century painting by Duccio depicting Jesus with two disciples now housed at Museo dell'Opera del Duomo in Siena, Italy

According to the Gospel of Luke, the road to Emmaus appearance is one of the early post-resurrection appearances of Jesus after his crucifixion and the discovery of the empty tomb. Both the meeting on the road to Emmaus and the subsequent Supper at Emmaus, the meal that Jesus had with two disciples after the encounter on the road, have been popular subjects in art.

== Biblical accounts ==
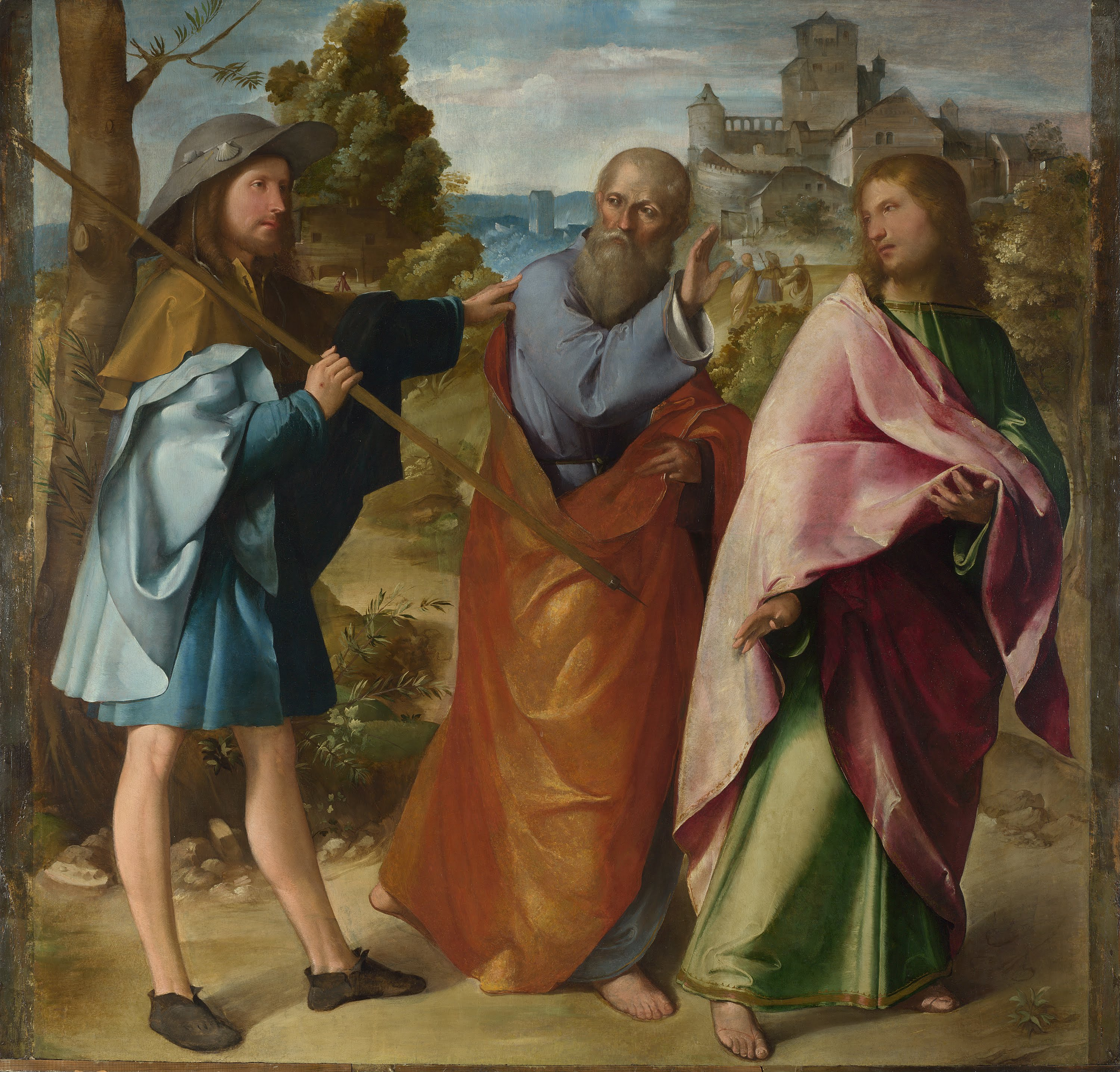
The Road to Emmaus, an early 16th century painting by Altobello Melone

The account in Luke 24:13–35 describes two disciples who are walking on the road to Emmaus, one named as Cleopas. On the way, they encounter Jesus after his resurrection from the dead, but they do not recognize him, and discuss their sadness at recent events of the Crucifixion and their incredulity at the reports from the women at the tomb at the Resurrection of Jesus. They invite him to come and eat with them, and during supper at Emmaus, they recognise the risen Jesus.

N. T. Wright considers the detailed narration of the Emmaus journey in Luke 24:13–35 as one of the best sketches of a biblical scene in the Gospel of Luke. Jan Lambrecht, citing D. P. Moessner, writes: "the Emmaus story is one of Luke's 'most exquisite literary achievements'."

=== Theme ===
Although it may be said that its main subject is proving the resurrection by the appearance of Jesus, this narrative seems not to say anything about proving the event. R. W. L. Moberly suggests that "the story is best understood as an exposition of the hermeneutical issue of discernment, focusing specifically on the question, 'How does one discern the risen Christ?'" Alfred McBride says that the Emmaus narrative concerns "the evolution of the awareness of the two disciples, from despair over Christ's death to faith in his resurrection". Used to perceive Christian spiritual growth, this narrative is considered as a model for a Christians' own journey to a deeper faith and as an instrument to help others do the same journey.

=== Parallels ===
The Gospel of Mark has a similar account that describes the appearance of Jesus to two disciples while they were walking in the country, at about the same time in the Gospel narrative, although it does not name the disciples or the destination as Emmaus:

Afterward Jesus appeared in a different form to two of them while they were walking in the country. These returned and reported it to the rest; but they did not believe them either.

— Mark 16:12–13

It has also been suggested that the Ethiopian eunuch story (Acts 8:26–40) is a "much discussed parallel" to the Emmaus narrative, since there are some recognizable similarities between the two. Lambrecht says, "Each event culminates with a ritual, the breaking and distributing of bread at Emmaus and the baptism of the Ethiopian along the road. [...] What remains as a common theme in both stories is the necessary hermeneutical connection between the Scriptures and the Jesus event. The Scriptures are to be interpreted in the light of 'the good news of Jesus' (Acts 8) and the Jesus events can only be understood in light of the Scriptures (Lk 24)."

=== Unnamed disciple ===
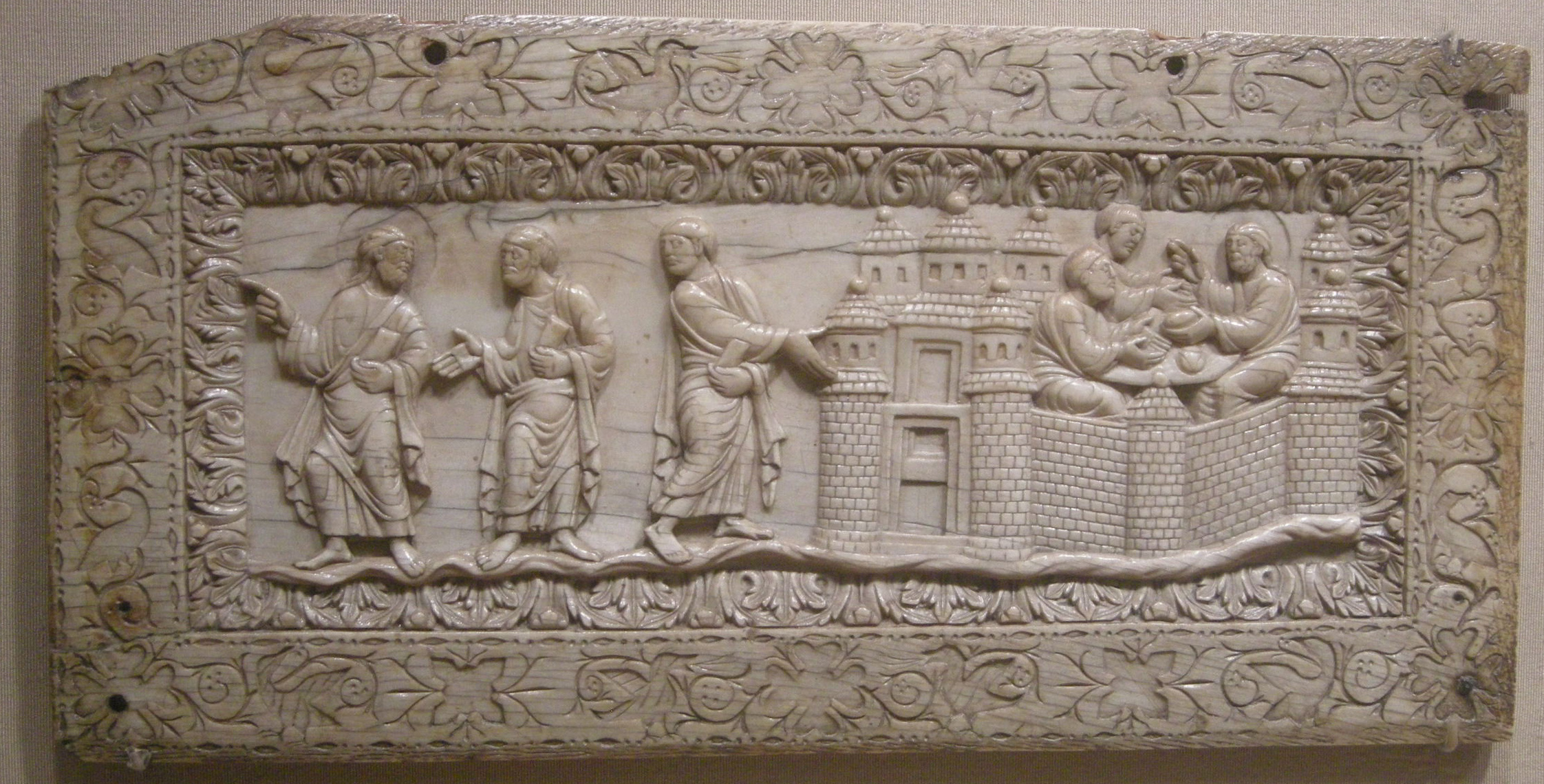
Ivory relief, a c. 850–900 plaque depicting the Road to Emmaus appearance by Metz

Many names have been proposed for the disciple who accompanied Cleopas. Among those who have been suggested: Simon/Symeon, according to several documents and manuscripts; Ammaon/Amaon, which may be a spelling error for "Symeon", according to Saint Ambrose; Nathanael, according to Saint Epiphanius's Panarion; Nicodemus, according to the Arabic Apocryphal Gospel of John; Luke the Evangelist, according to the Book of the Bee; Philip the Deacon; James, brother of Jesus; and Mary, the wife (or possibly daughter) of Clopas, who is considered the same person as Cleopas.

John Gillman, in a Festschrift to Jan Lambrecht, writes that "Luke's failure to identify Cleophas' companion by either name or gender may well be a strategy of inviting the reader to identify implicitly with that person, and thus to make the journey as Cleophas' companion."

=== The journey to Emmaus ===
The two followers were walking along the road, heading to Emmaus, deep in solemn and serious discussion, when Jesus met them. They could not recognize Jesus and saw him as a stranger. In Homilies on the Gospels (Hom. 23), Gregory the Great says:

They did not, in fact, have faith in him, yet they were talking about him. The Lord, therefore, appeared to them but did not show them a face they could recognize. In this way, the Lord enacted outwardly, before their physical eyes, what was going on in them inwardly, before the eyes of their hearts. For inwardly they simultaneously loved him and doubted him; therefore the Lord was outwardly present to them, and at the same time did not reveal his identity. Since they were speaking about him, he showed them his presence, but since they doubted him, he hid from them the appearance by which they could have recognized him.

Jesus let them tell about their anxieties and pains; he let them grieve and mourn by expressing the root causes. Jesus empathically listened to them, who poured out their crises and doubts, and used scriptures so that they could better understand "suffering and glory". During the journey to Emmaus, according to Alfred McBride, Jesus patiently guided the two disciples "from hopelessness to celebration" and also intended to nourish the two disciples' faith to such an extent that they can see "his real presence in the breaking of the bread".

From a pastoral perspective, John Mossi writes that meditating upon the "Emmaus Pilgrimage" may help one when experiencing one's own "dark nights". During such course of action, according to Mossi, one should realize that Jesus compassionately walks as a friend on one's own journey, empathetically listens to one's sorrows and hesitations, and spends quality time accompanying one through the process of inner healing.

=== "Stay with us" ===
Luke 24:28–29 states that Jesus stayed and had supper with the two disciples after the encounter on the road:

As they approached the village to which they were going, Jesus acted as if he were going farther. But they urged him strongly, "Stay with us, for it is nearly evening; the day is almost over." So he went in to stay with them.

— Luke 24:28–29 NIV

The two disciples showed their openness and caring to the unknown stranger, who is Jesus, by inviting him to stay with them, to join in meal and companionship. Lambrecht argues that such attitudes made Jesus able to change them deeply: "By the offer of hospitality the Emmaus companions were able to transcend their self-concern, sadness, foolishness and slowness of heart, thus preparing them for the revelatory experience around the table where they were nourished."

=== Supper at Emmaus ===
At first, Jesus appears to Cleopas and one other disciple, but "their eyes were holden" so that they could not recognize him. Later, "in the breaking of bread" (Luke 24:30), "their eyes were opened" and they recognized him (Luke 24:31). B. P. Robinson argues that this means that the recognition occurred in the course of the meal, while Raymond Blacketer notes that "many, perhaps even most, commentators, ancient and modern and in-between, have seen the revelation of Jesus' identity in the breaking of bread as having some kind of eucharistic referent or implication."

In his apostolic letter Mane nobiscum Domine, John Paul II says that when the two disciples urged Jesus to stay with them, Jesus afterwards responded by giving them a way to stay in him, by entering into "a profound communion with Jesus" through the "Sacrament of the Eucharist" (cf. John 15:4). Soon after Jesus agreed to their request to stay, according to the Pope, "Jesus' face would disappear, yet the Master would 'stay' with them, hidden in the 'breaking of the bread' which had opened their eyes to recognize him. [...] When minds are enlightened and hearts are enkindled, signs begin to 'speak'."

=== Return to Jerusalem ===
Luke 24:32 states that the two disciples' hearts were "burning" during their conversation with Jesus along the way to Emmaus, especially when he explained the Scriptures. They have gone through "a journey symbolizing their change of hearts from 'sad' to 'burning'", and they immediately returned to Jerusalem to share their experience with other fellows (Luke 24:33).

Alfred McBride says that "enthusiasm flooded their whole being" when the two disciples have "encounter[ed] the Risen Christ" in the supper at Emmaus. They sensed a must to share their happiness and the good news with another so that they were willing to go through a long walk back to Jerusalem. John Paul II argues that the two disciples realized "the duty to be a missionary" after "entering into communion with Christ" at the meal event, relates it with the dismissal at the end of the Eucharistic Celebration.

== In art ==
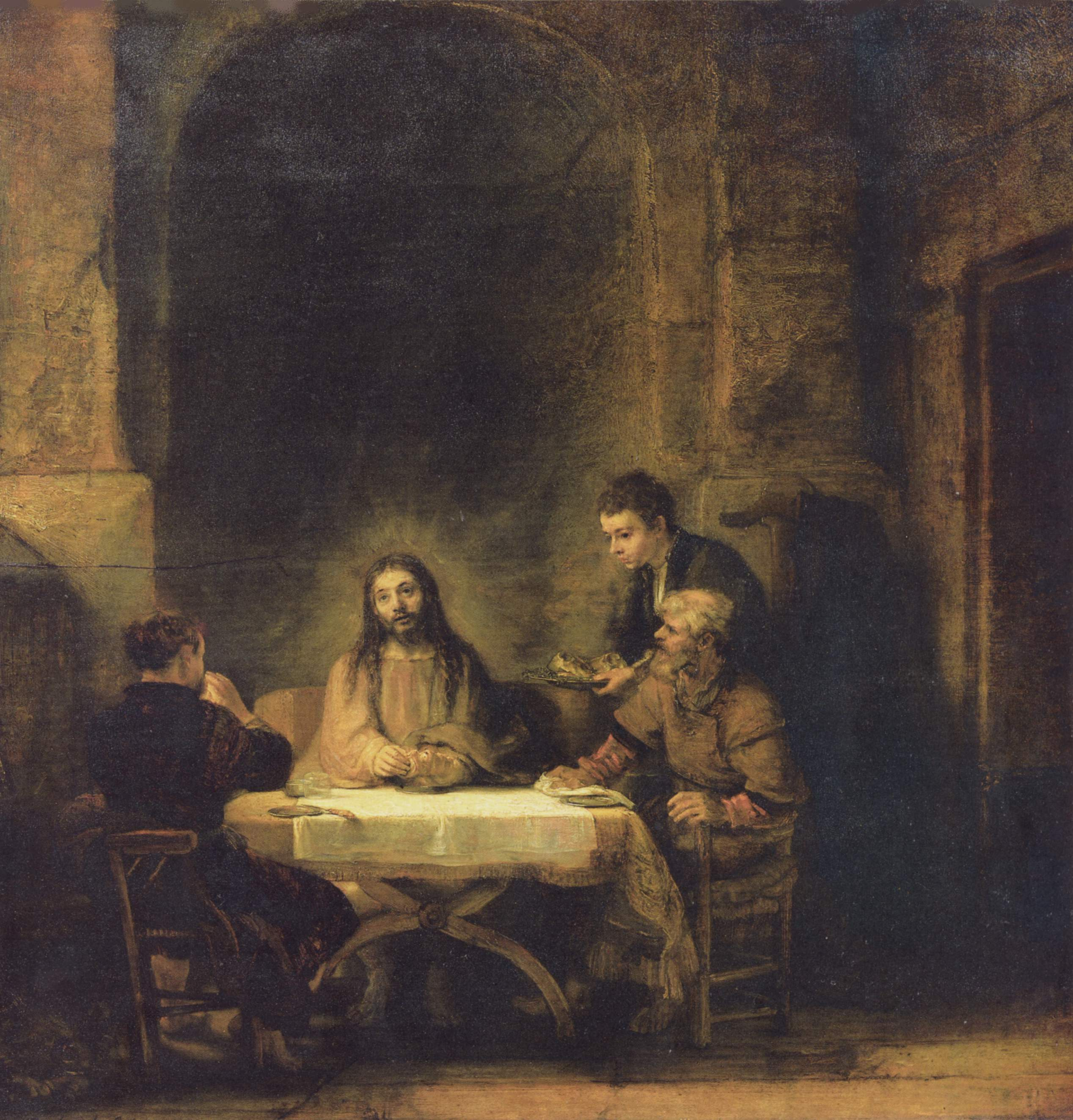
Supper at Emmaus, a 1648 painting by Rembrandt now housed at the Louvre in Paris

Both the encounter on the road to Emmaus and the ensuing supper have been depicted in art. The supper has received more attention. Medieval art tends to show a moment before Jesus is recognized; Christ wears a large floppy hat to help explain the initial lack of recognition by the disciples. This is often a large pilgrim's hat with badges or, rarely, a Jewish hat. However, the depiction of the supper has been a more popular theme, at least since the Renaissance, showing Jesus eating with the disciples. Often the moment of recognition is shown.

Rembrandt's 1648 painting, Supper at Emmaus depicts the supper, which the disciple on the left had risen, hands clasped in prayer. In both depictions, the disciples are startled and in awe but not in fear. The servant is oblivious to the theophanic moment taking place during the supper.

Caravaggio's painting in London and his painting in Milan were six years apart, and both imitate natural color very well, but both were criticized for lack of decorum. Caravaggio depicted Jesus without a beard, and the London painting shows fruits on the table that are out of season. Moreover, the inn keeper is shown serving with a hat.

Some other artists who have portrayed the supper are Jacopo Bassano, Pontormo, Vittore Carpaccio, Philippe de Champaigne, Albrecht Dürer, Benedetto Gennari, Jacob Jordaens, Marco Marziale, Pedro Orrente, Tintoretto, Titian, Velázquez, and Paolo Veronese. The supper was also the subject of one of Han van Meegeren's most successful Vermeer forgeries.

In literary art, the Emmaus theme is treated as early as the 12th century by Durham poet Laurentius in a semidramatic Latin poem.

=== Gallery of art ===
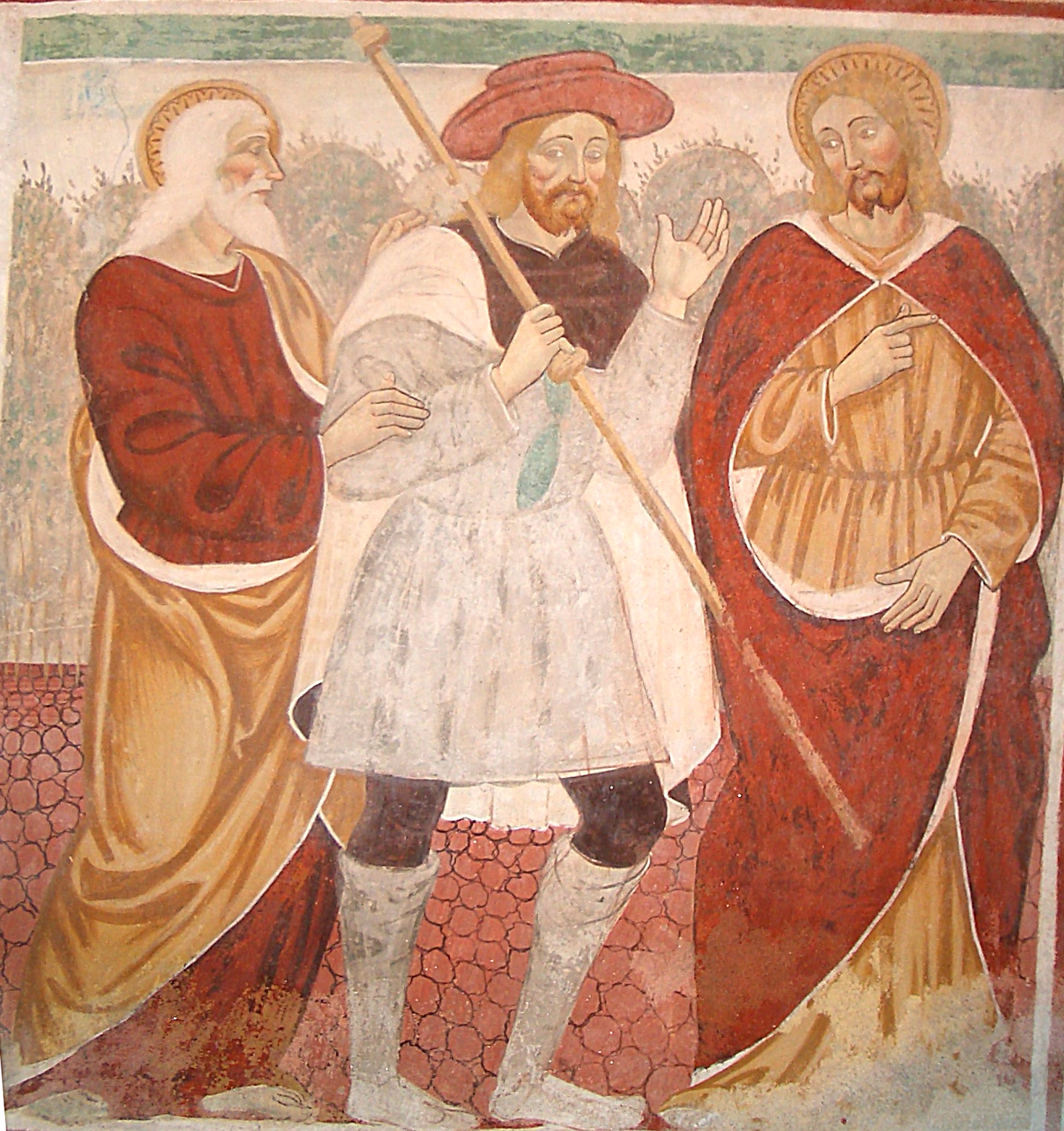
Meeting at Emmaus, at Oratory of the Holy Trinity in Momo, Italy, late 15th century

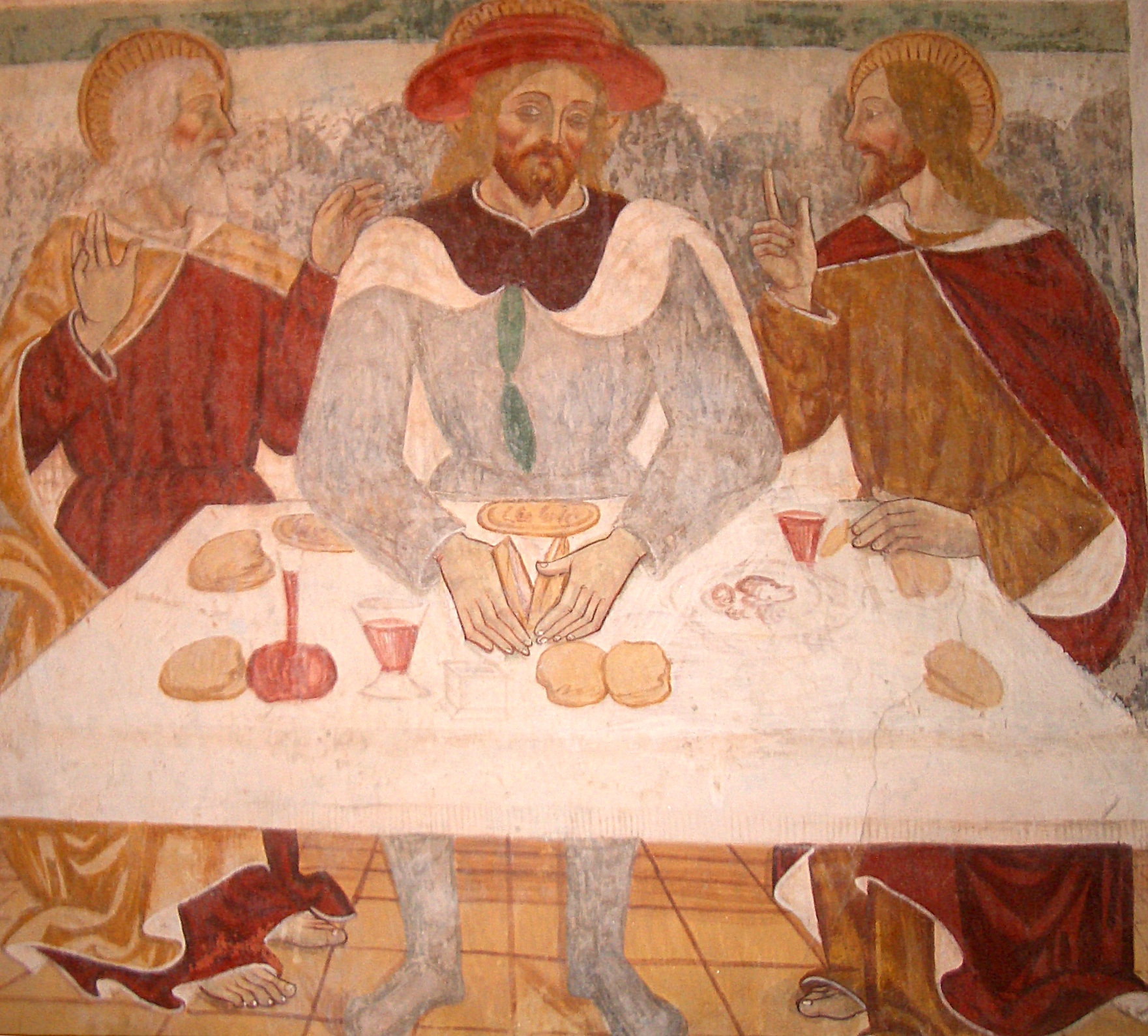
Supper at Emmaus, at Oratory of the Holy Trinity in Momo, Italy, late 15th century

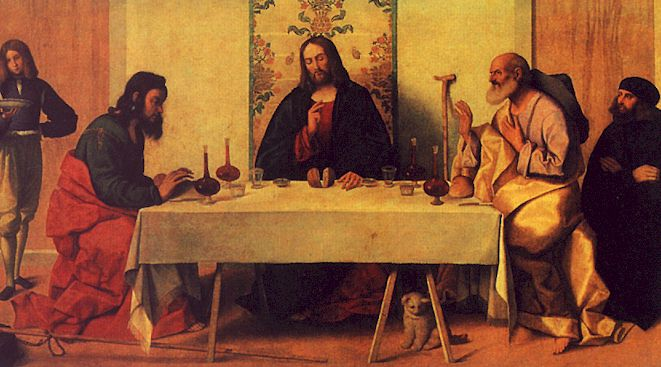
The Supper at Emmaus, Vincenzo Catena, 16th century

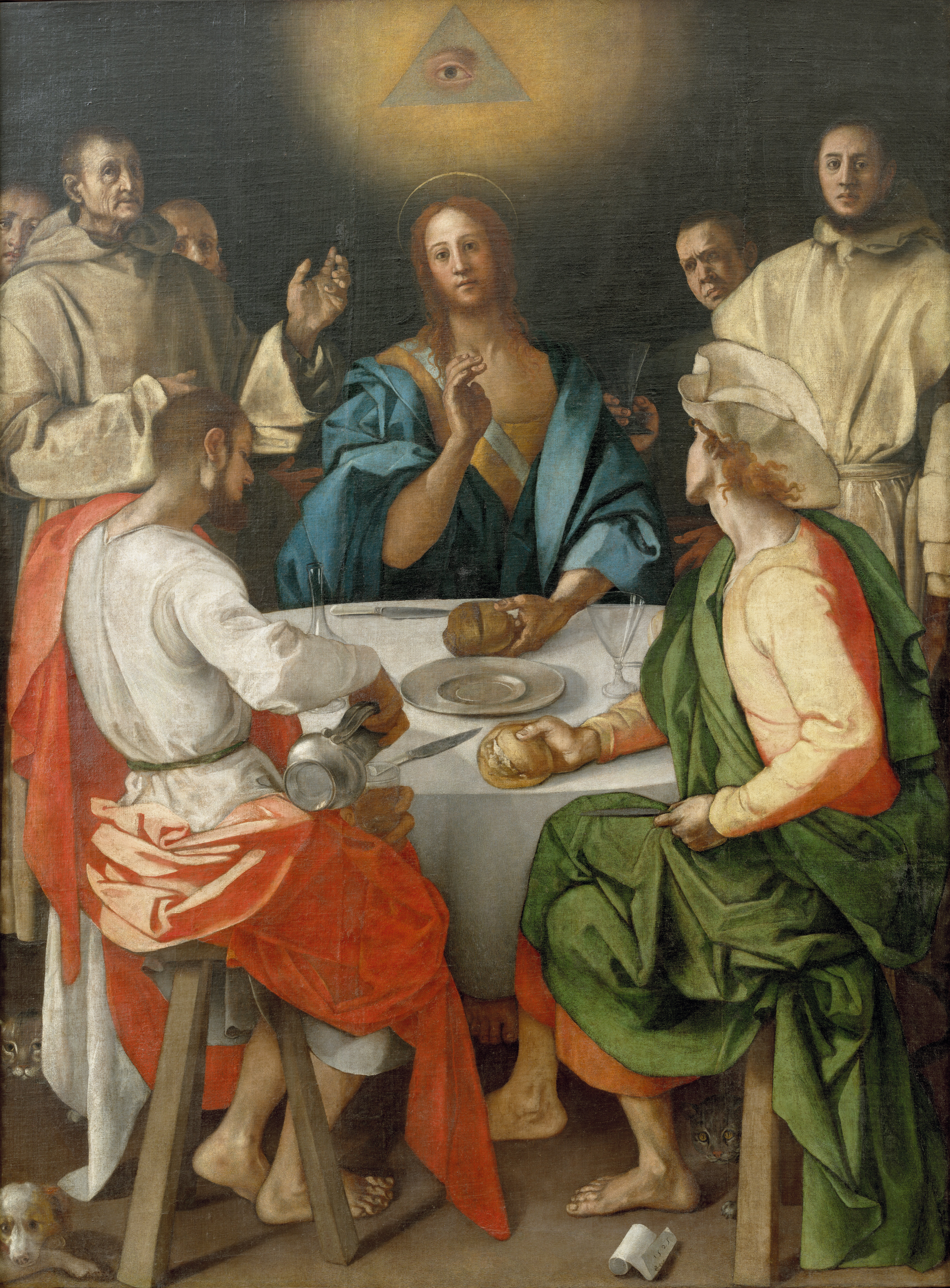
Supper at Emmaus, a 1525 Jacopo Pontormo painting using the Eye of Providence

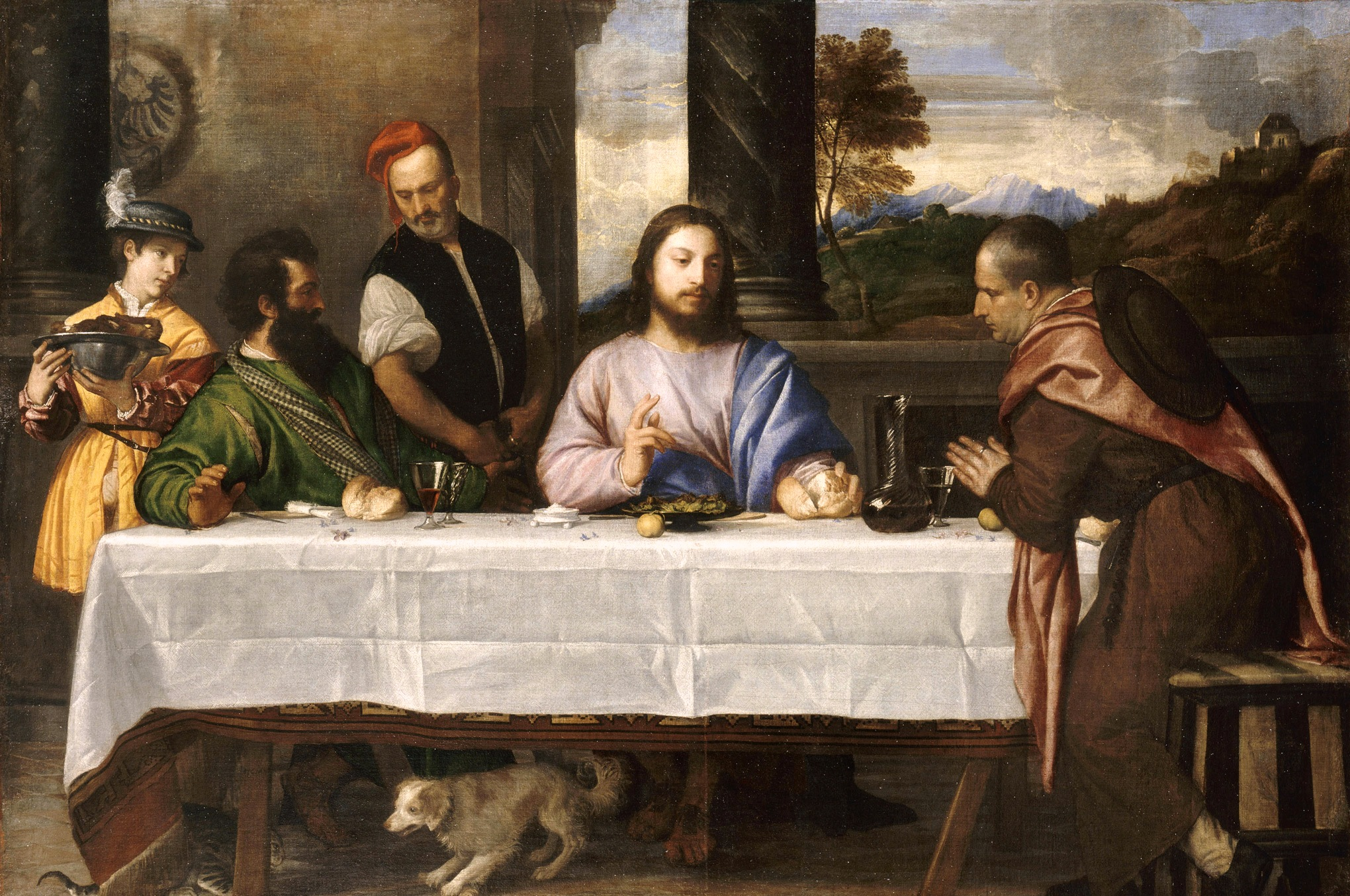
Pilgrims at Emmaus, Titian, 1535, Louvre

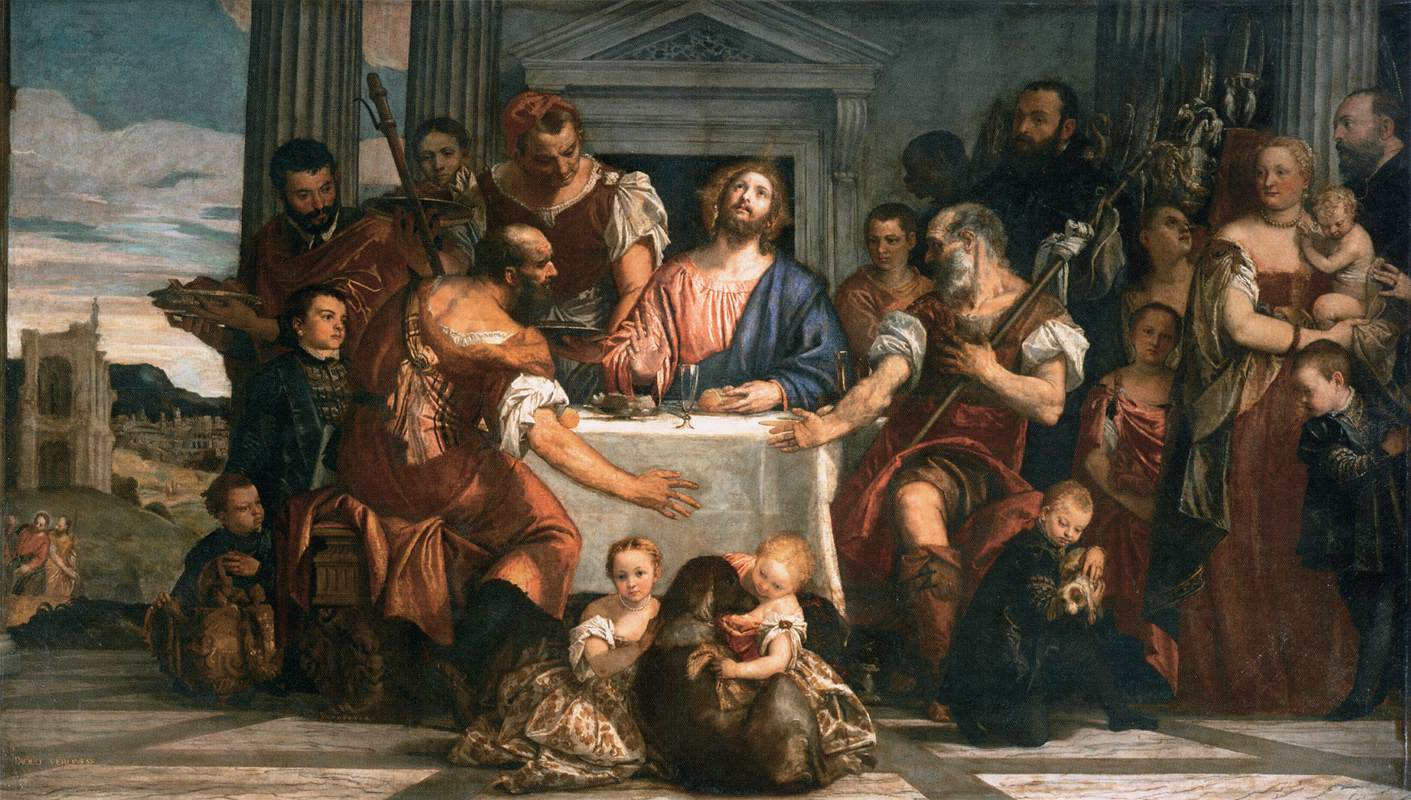
Supper at Emmaus, Veronese, 1559, Louvre

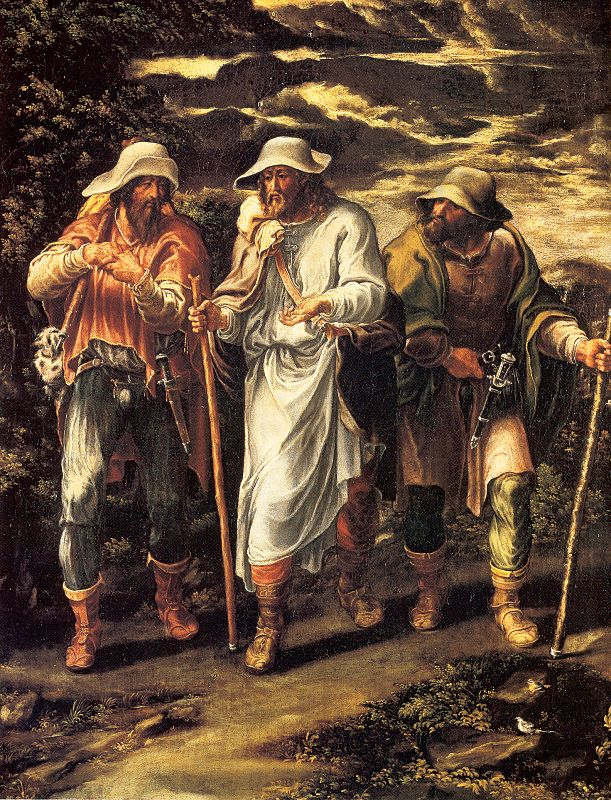
Camino de Emaús, by Lelio Orsi, 1560–1565

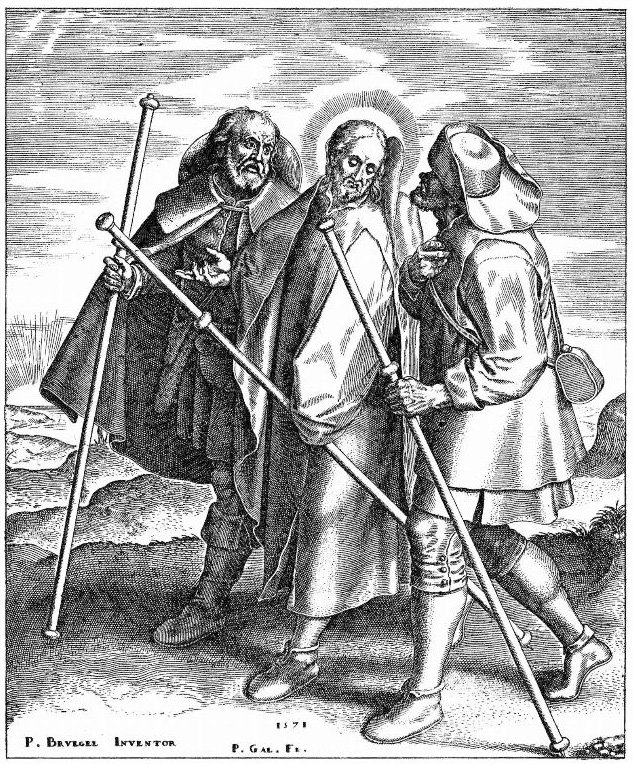
Jesus and the Disciples on the Road to Emmaus, after Pieter Bruegel the Elder, 1571

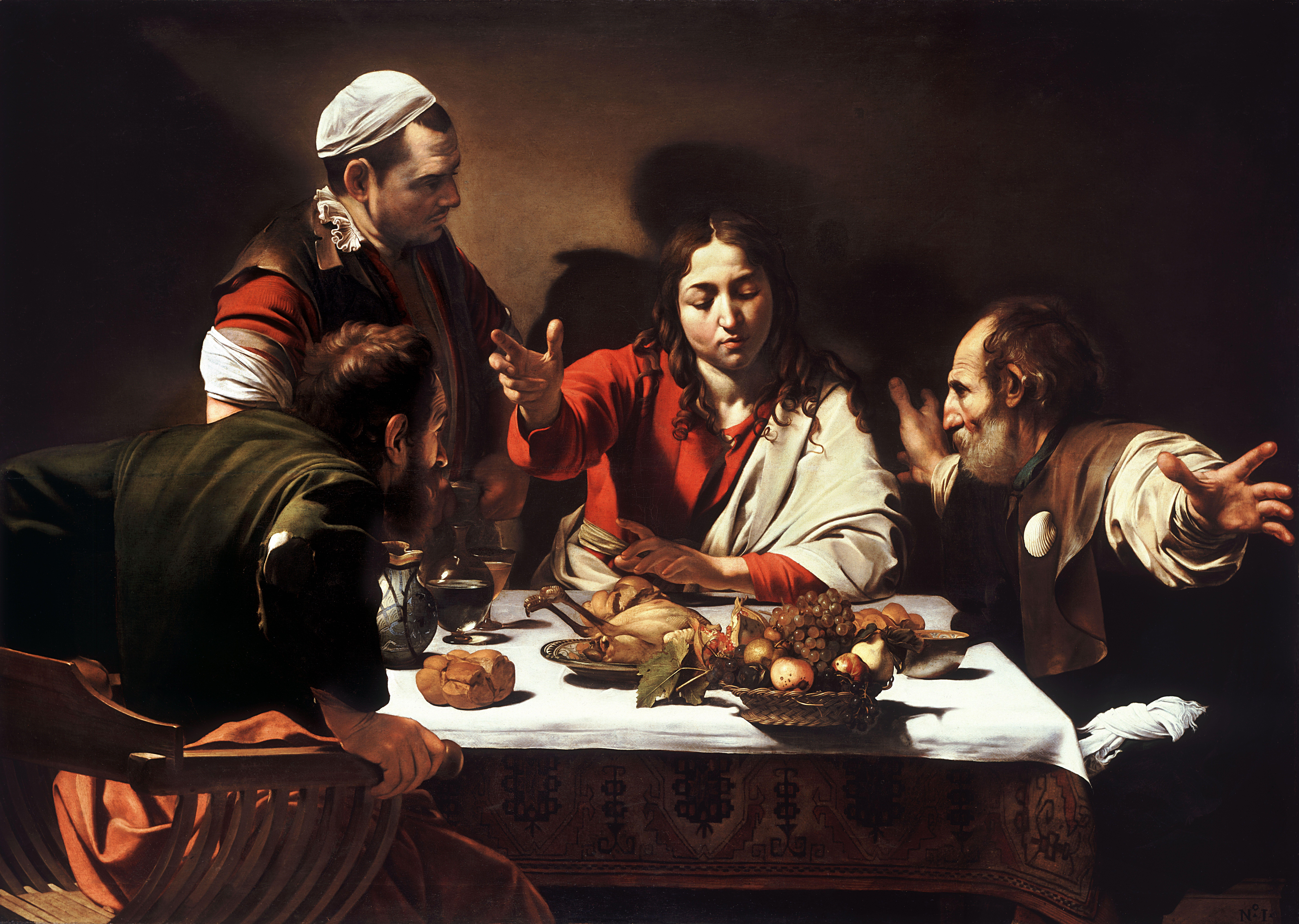
Supper at Emmaus, Caravaggio, 1601, London

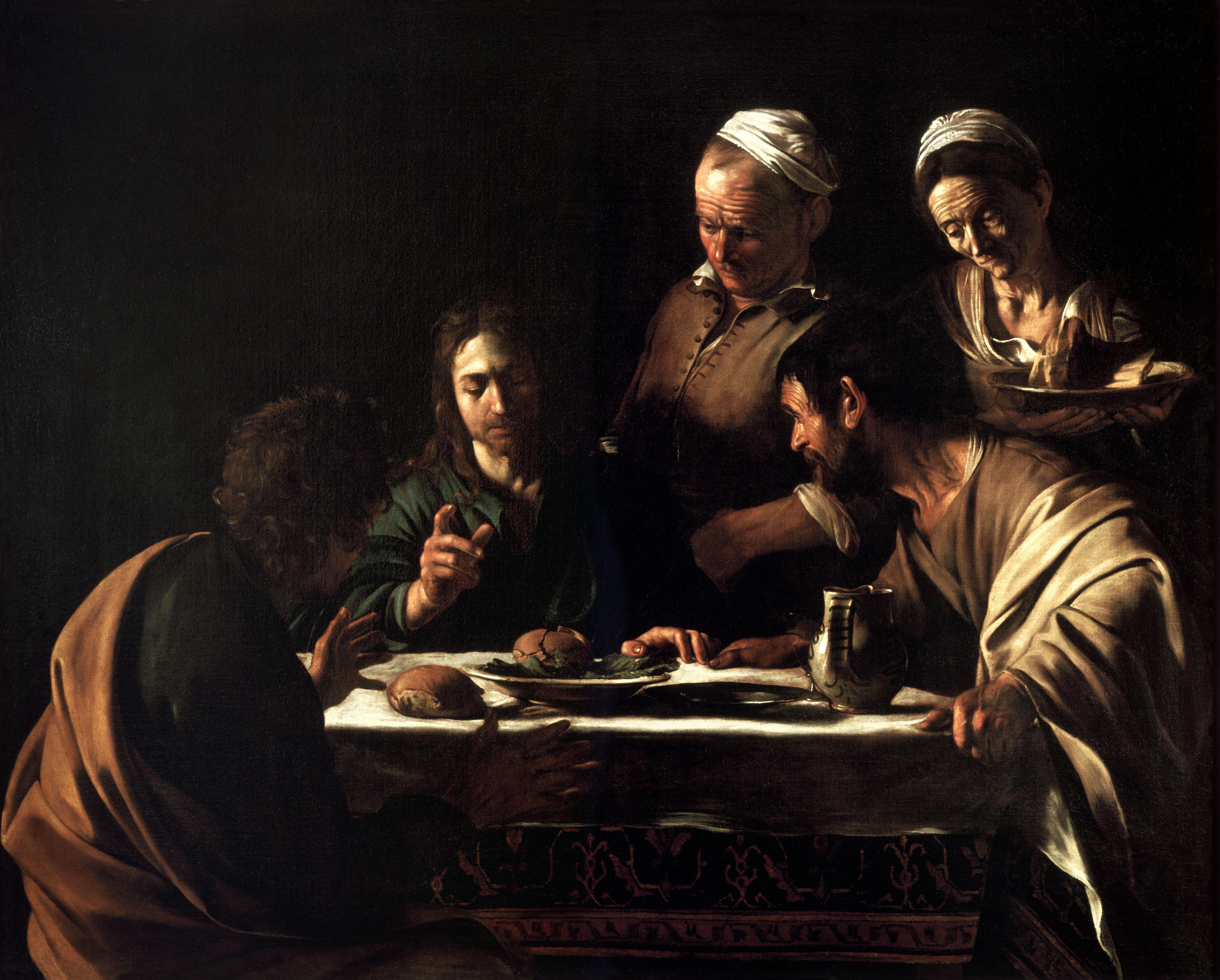
Supper at Emmaus, Caravaggio, 1606, Milan

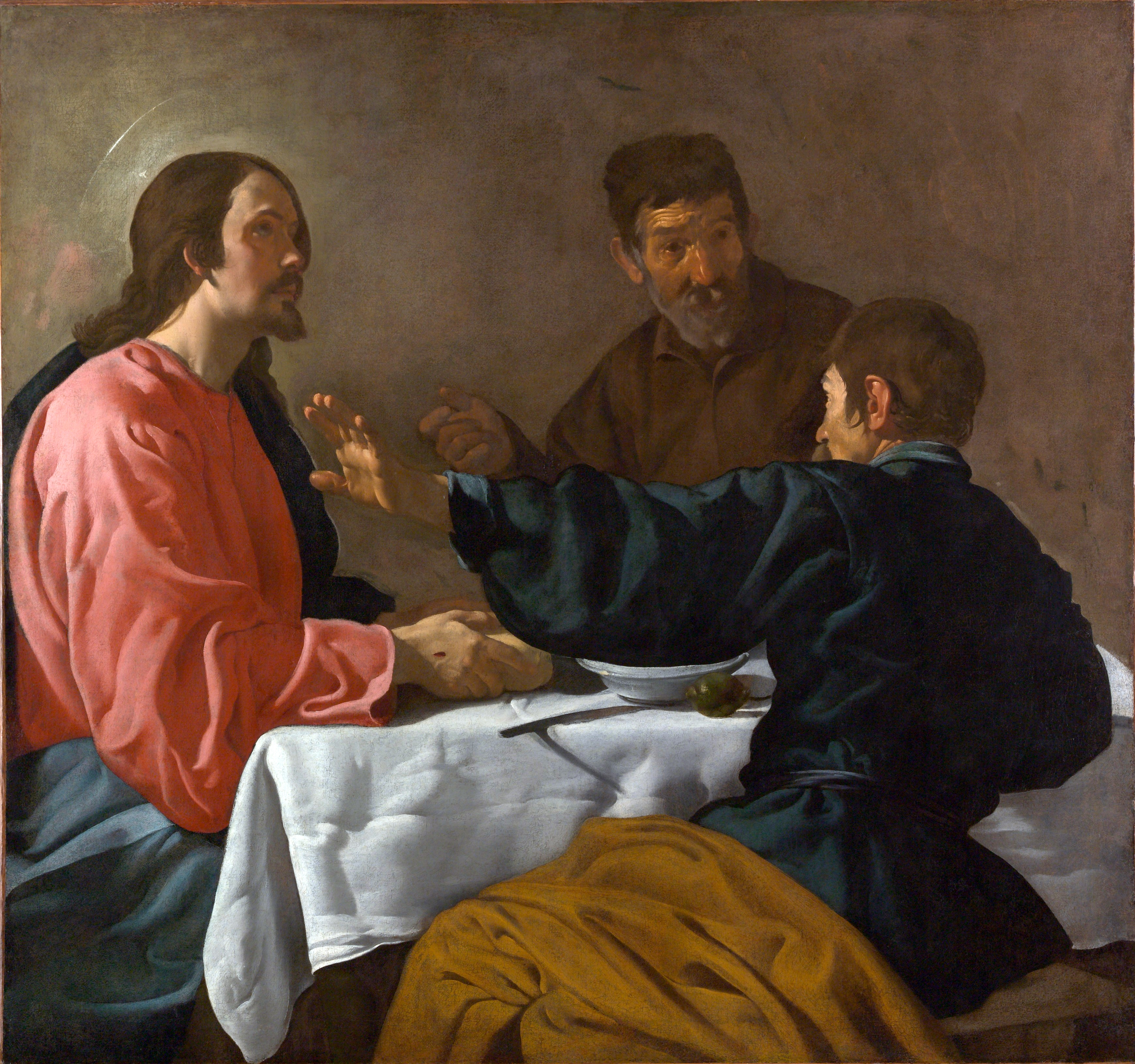
La cena de Emaús, Diego Velázquez, 1620, New York

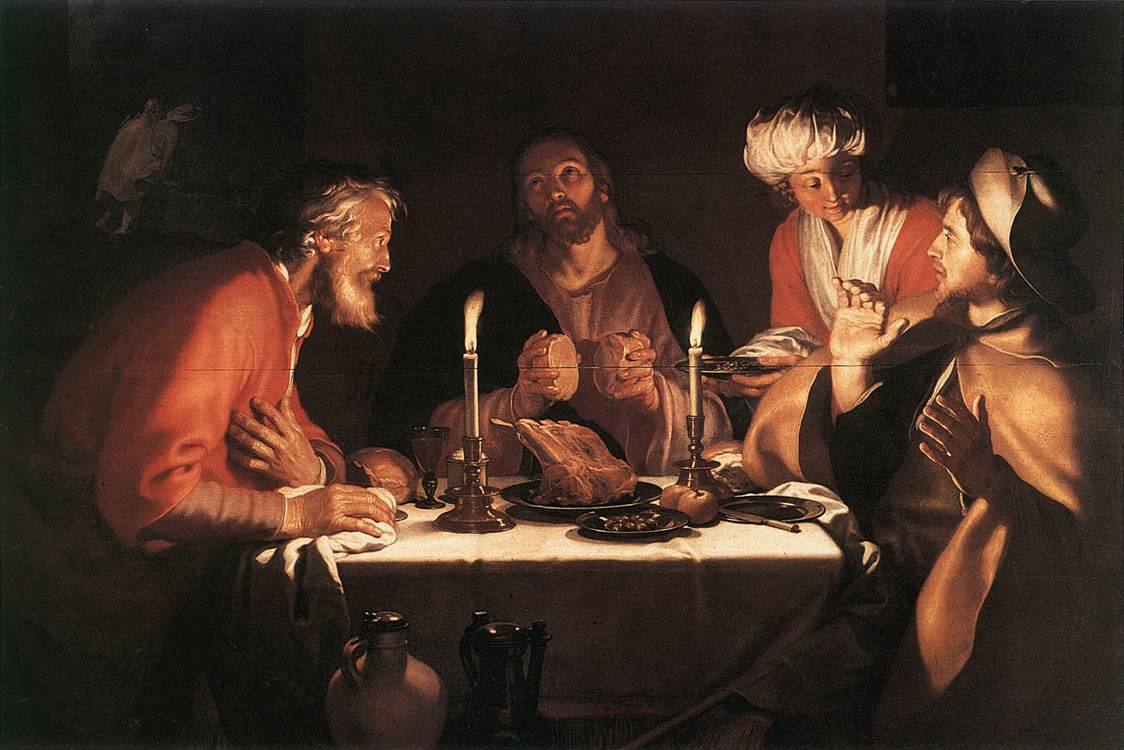
The Emmaus Disciples, Abraham Bloemaert, 1622

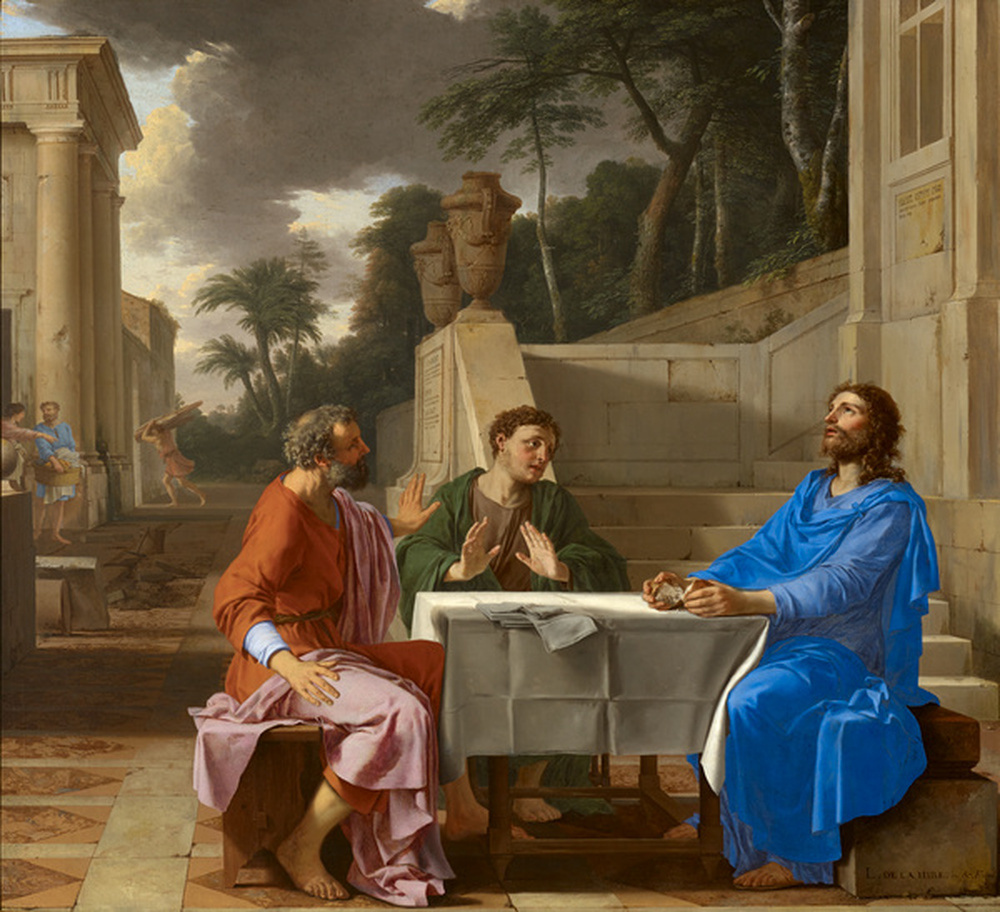
L'Apparition du Christ aux pèlerins d'Emmaüs, Laurent de La Hyre, 1656

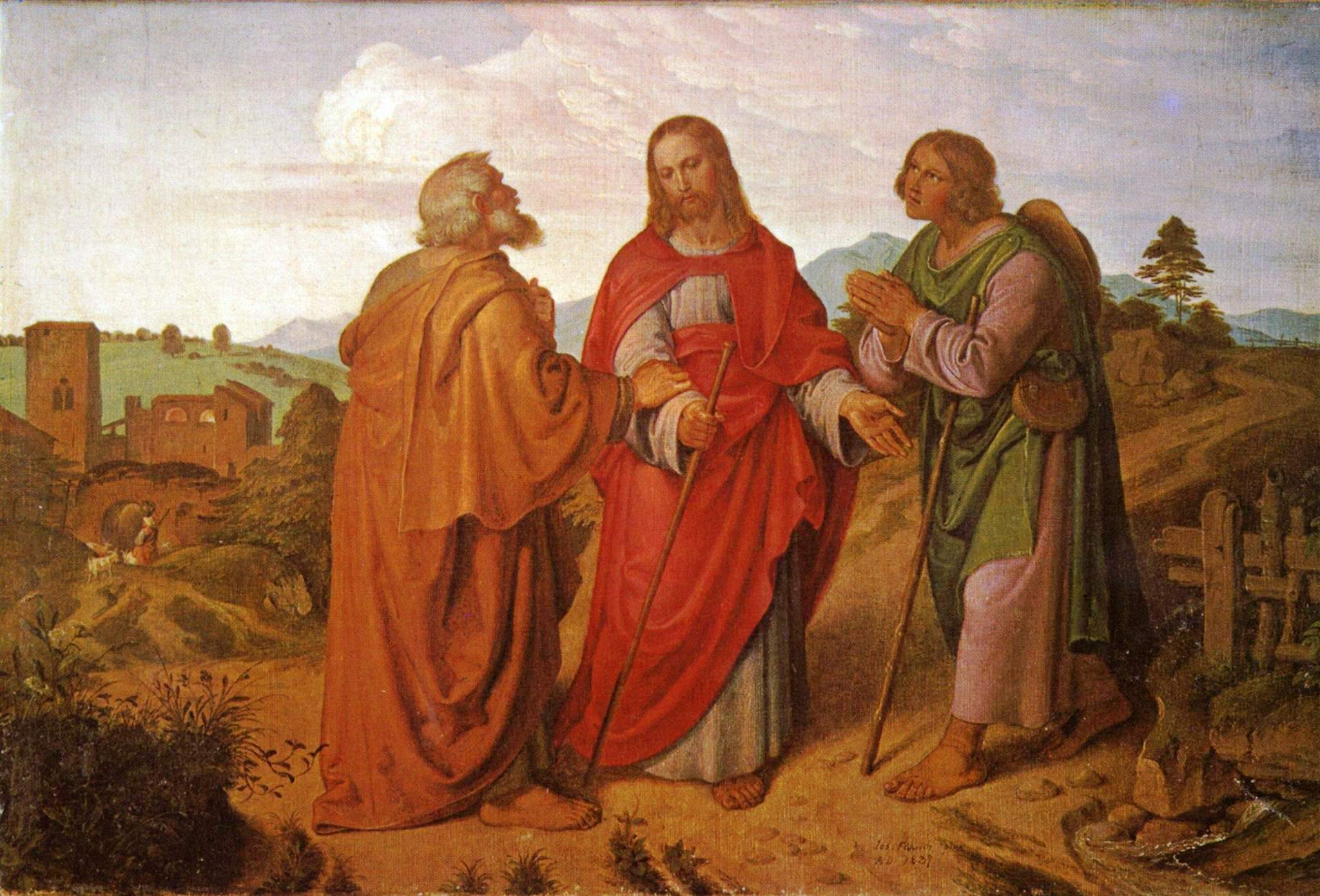
Der Gang nach Emmaus, Joseph von Führich, 1837

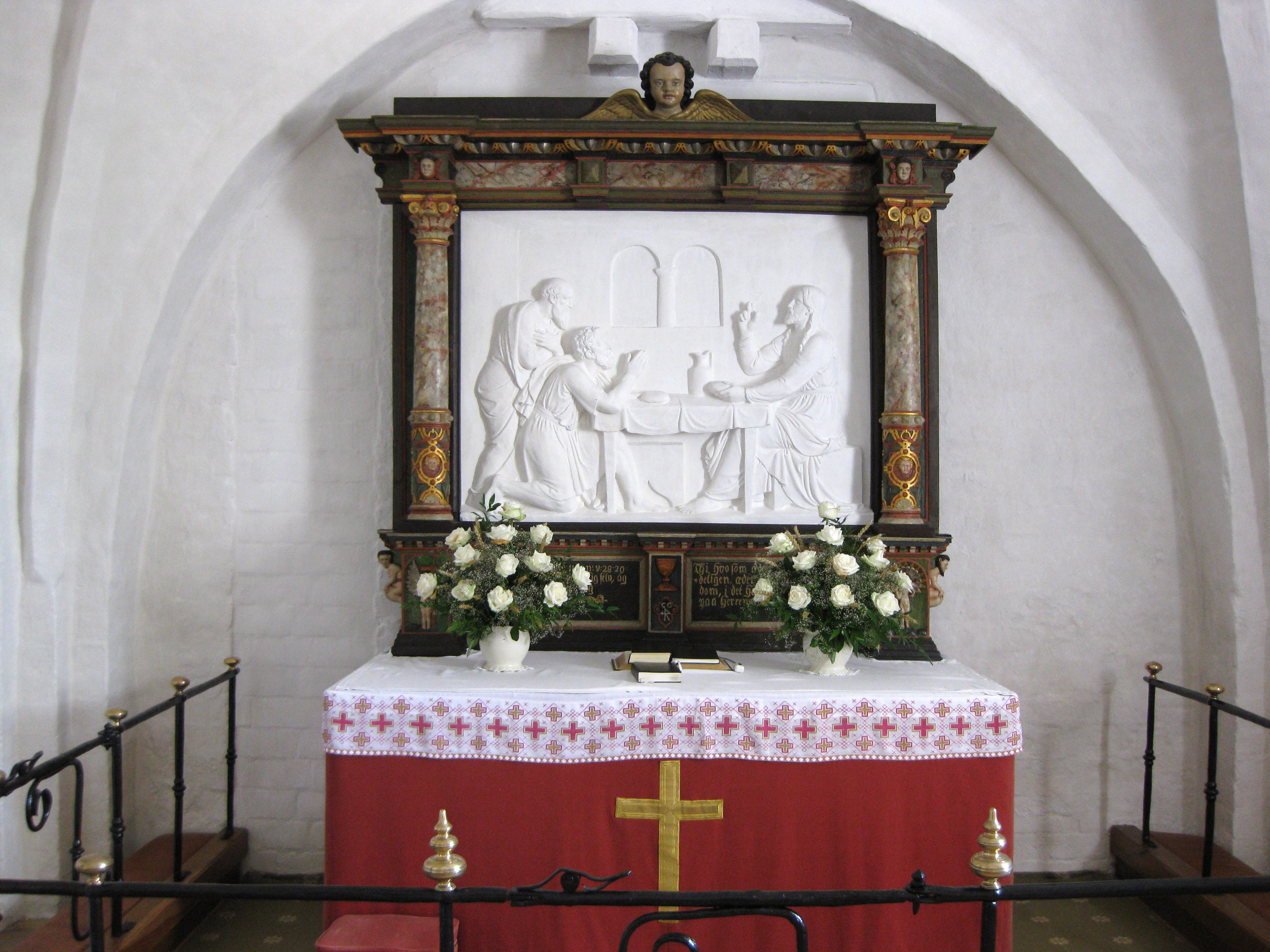
The altar of Jungshoved Kirke. Sculpture by Bertel Thorvaldsen (plaster). 1840s

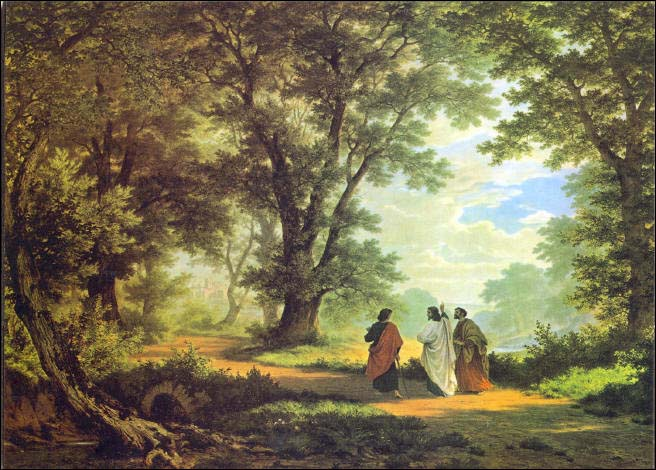
Gang nach Emmaus, Robert Zünd, 1877

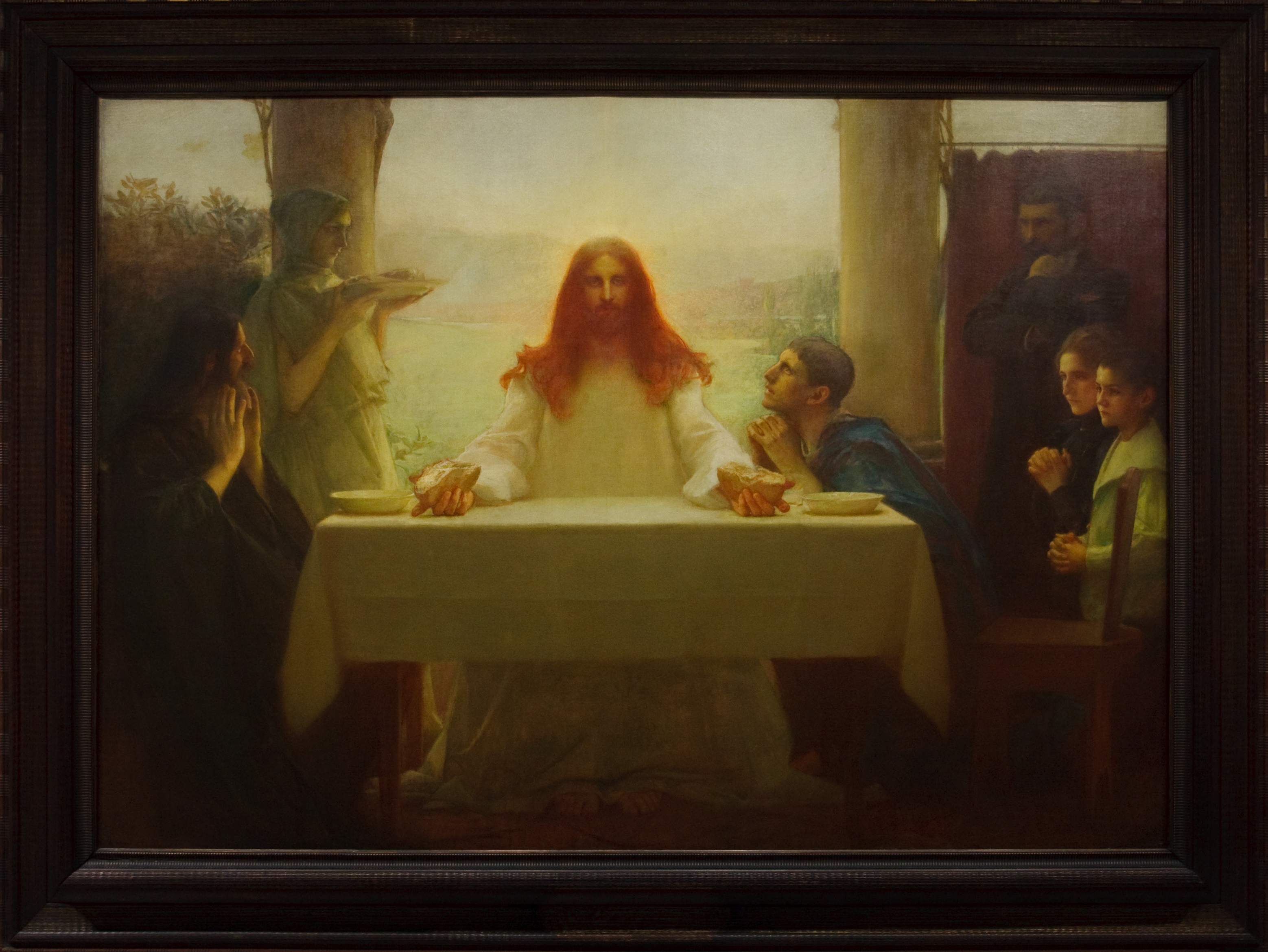
Christ and the Disciples at Emmaus (1896- 1897) by Pascal Dagnan-Bouveret

== In music ==
The gospel was the prescribed reading for Easter Monday in Lutheran Leipzig at Bach's time. He composed several church cantatas for the occasion, including the chorale cantata Bleib bei uns, denn es will Abend werden, BWV 6, in 1725.

Josef Rheinberger composed in 1855 a motet Abendlied on a verse from the gospel narration, "Bleib bei uns" (Bide with us).

The American southern gospel music group The Emmaus Road Quartet takes their name from the Biblical account. They also recorded a song entitled "On The Road to Emmaus" in 2019, in which the lyrics espouse a desire to walk with a risen Jesus Christ and be taught the scriptures by him.

== Jungian perspective ==
Carl Jung regarded the road to Emmaus appearance as a mythological example of the common dream theme of the magical traveling companion.

== Contemporary use ==
Emmaus, Pennsylvania, a borough in the Lehigh Valley region of the United States, draws its name from the Biblical references to Emmaus.

== See also ==
- Chronology of Jesus
- Emmaus-Nicopolis
- Gospel harmony
- Life of Jesus in the New Testament
- List of dining events
- Resurrection appearance of Jesus
- Resurrection of Jesus
