= Supper at Emmaus (Caravaggio, Milan) =

Painting by Caravaggio

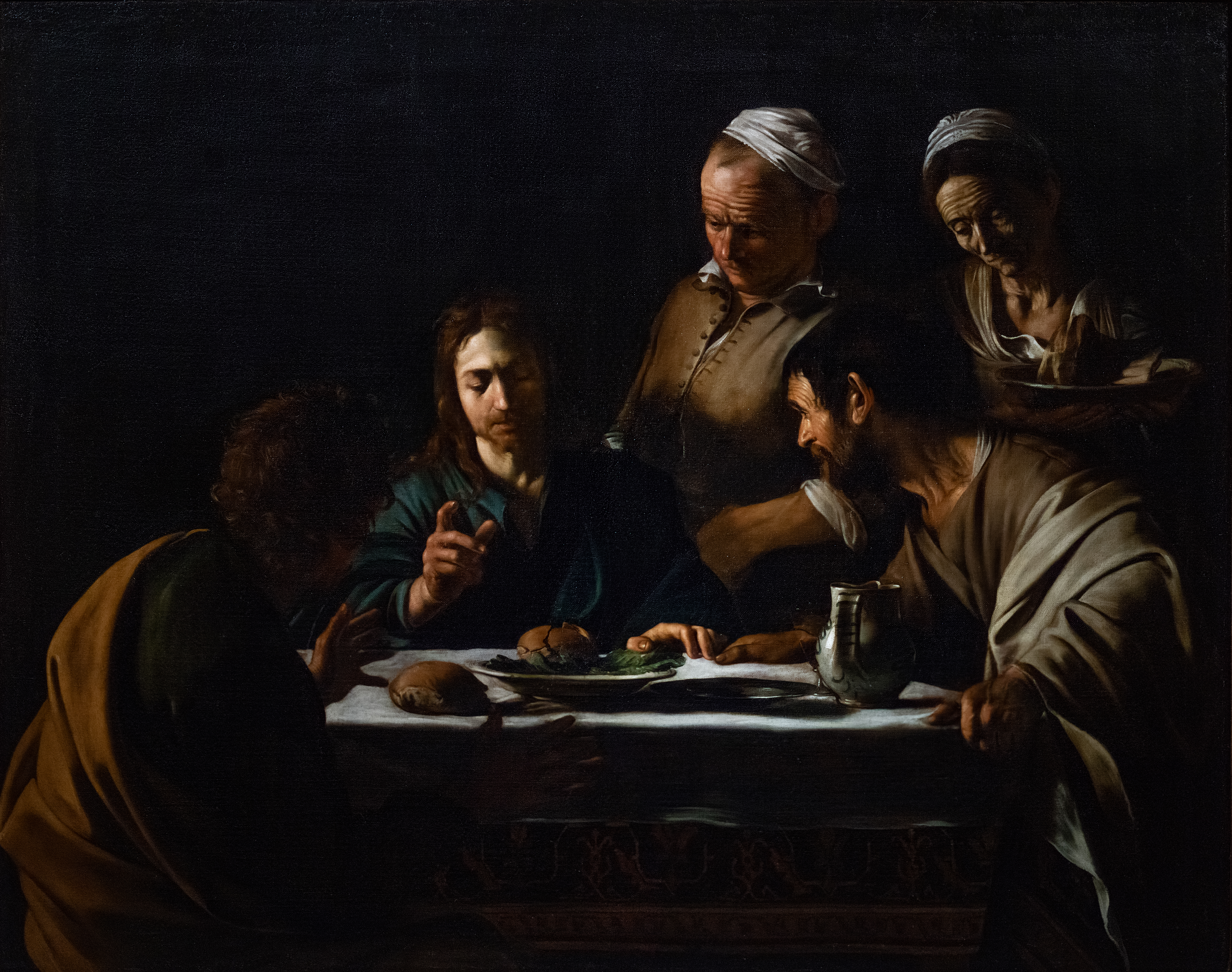
- Artist: Caravaggio
- Year: 1606
- Medium: Oil on canvas
- Dimensions: 141 cm × 175 cm (56 in × 69 in)
- Location: Pinacoteca di Brera, Milan

Supper at Emmaus (1606) is a painting by the Italian master Caravaggio, housed in the Pinacoteca di Brera, Milan. It depicts the Gospel story of the resurrected Jesus's appearance in Emmaus.

== Description ==
The painting depicts the moment when the resurrected but incognito Jesus (in the Gospel of Mark 16:12, Jesus is said to have appeared to them "in another form") reveals himself to two of his disciples (presumed to be Luke and Cleopas) in the town of Emmaus, only to soon vanish from their sight (Gospel of Luke 24: 30–31).

Some details—the ear of the disciple on the right, the right hand of the innkeeper's wife—remain badly drawn, but there is a fluidity in the handling of the paint which was to increase in Caravaggio's post-Roman work as his brushwork became increasingly calligraphic. The artist may have had problems working out his composition—the innkeeper's wife looks like a last-minute addition. Neither she nor the innkeeper are mentioned in the Gospel of Luke 24: 28–32, but had been introduced by Renaissance painters to act as a foil to the amazement of the two disciples as they recognise the resurrected Christ.

== Origin ==
The painting was in the collection of Marchese Patrizi by 1624, and possibly commissioned by him. References by Caravaggio's early biographers Giulio Mancini and Giovanni Bellori suggest it was painted in the few months after May 1606 when the artist was in hiding on the estates of Prince Marzio Colonna as a fugitive from the law after killing a local thug, Ranuccio Tomassoni, during a tennis match. However, it may also have been painted in Rome earlier in the year—the innkeeper's wife seems to be the same as the model for Saint Anne in Madonna and Child with St. Anne of 1605. However, given the almost complete echoing of pose and lighting, she may have been done from memory.

== Major loans ==
From 5 June to 31 August 2013, Supper at Emmaus was exhibited in the Museum of Arts and Crafts in Zagreb, as a welcoming present of the Italian government for Croatia's joining the European Union on 1 June 2013.

In March 2014, Supper at Emmaus was loaned to Hong Kong's The Asia Society for an exhibition called "Light and Shadows – Caravaggio • The Italian Baroque Master". The society also arranged other artworks and activities to promote the exhibition in Park Court, Pacific Place, which ran from 12 March until 13 April 2014.

The painting was loaned to Palazzo Barberini (home to Galleria Nazionale d'Arte Antica) from 7 March 2025 to 6 July 2025, as part of the exhibit "Caravaggio 2025".

== London version ==
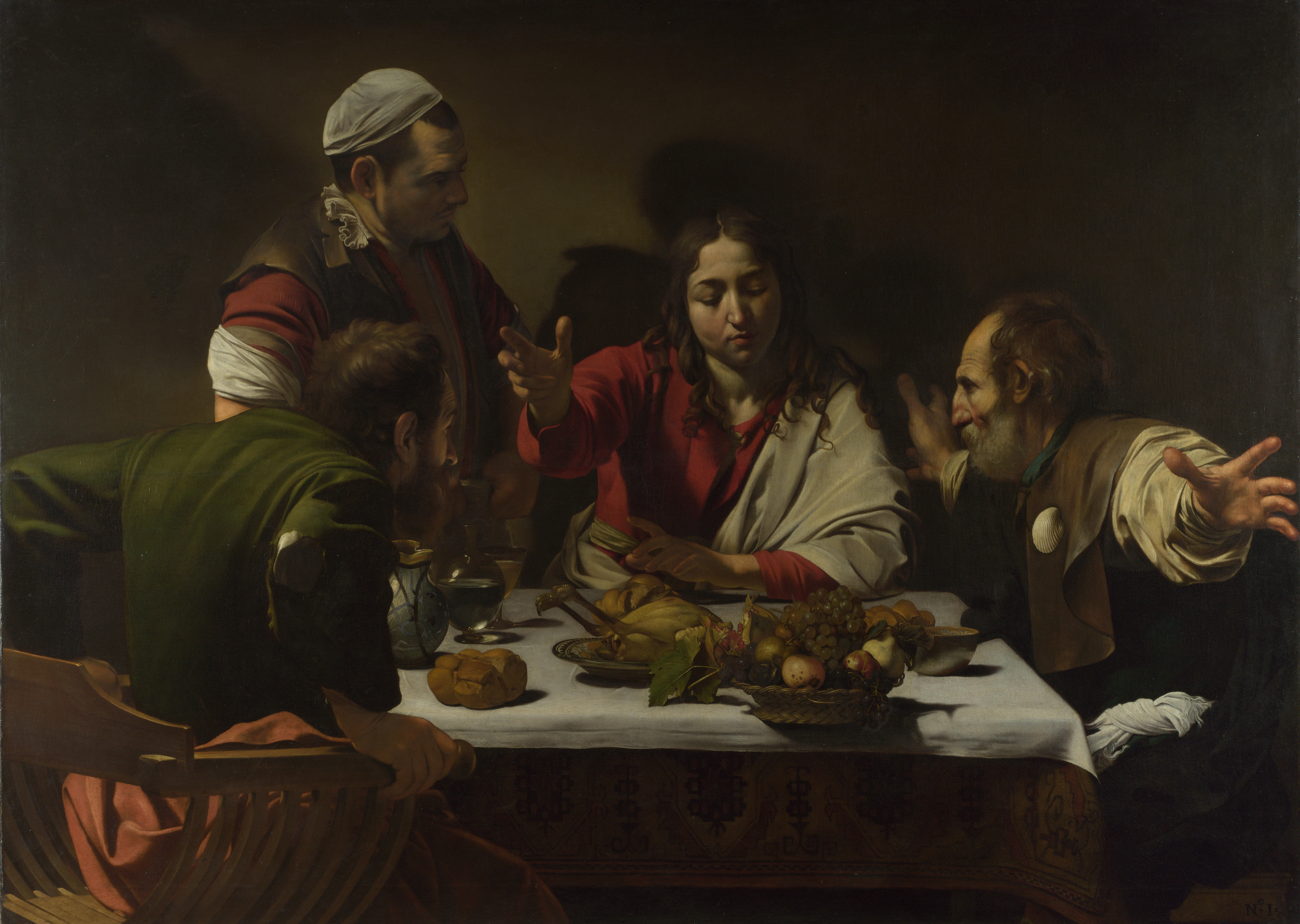
Supper at Emmaus. 1601. National Gallery, London

The painting inevitably invites comparison with an earlier version (1601) of the same subject located in the National Gallery in London. The expansive theatrical gestures seen in the London version have, in the Milan version, become understated and natural, the shadows are darkened, and the colours muted although still saturated. The effect emphasizes presence more than drama.

== See also ==
- Road to Emmaus appearance
- List of paintings by Caravaggio

== Sources ==
- Gash, John (2003). Caravaggio. Chaucer. ISBN 1-904449-22-0.
- Langdon, Helen (1998). Caravaggio: A Life. Farrar, Straus and Giroux. ISBN 0-374-11894-9.
- Robb, Peter (1998). M. Macmillan. ISBN 0-312-27474-2.
- Schütze, Sebastian (2009). Caravaggio: the Complete Paintings. Taschen. ISBN 9783836501835.
