= Marco Marziale =

Italian painter

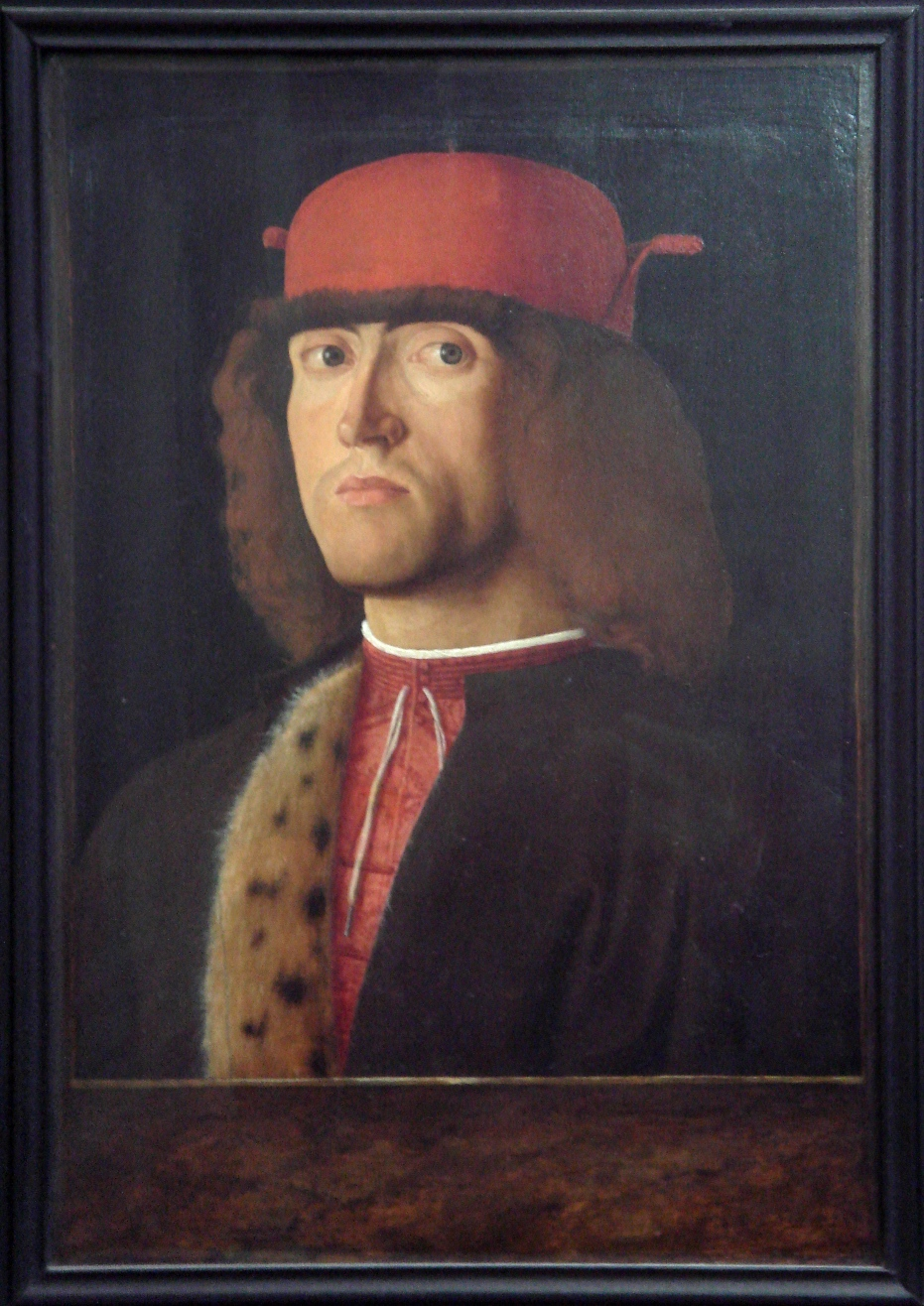
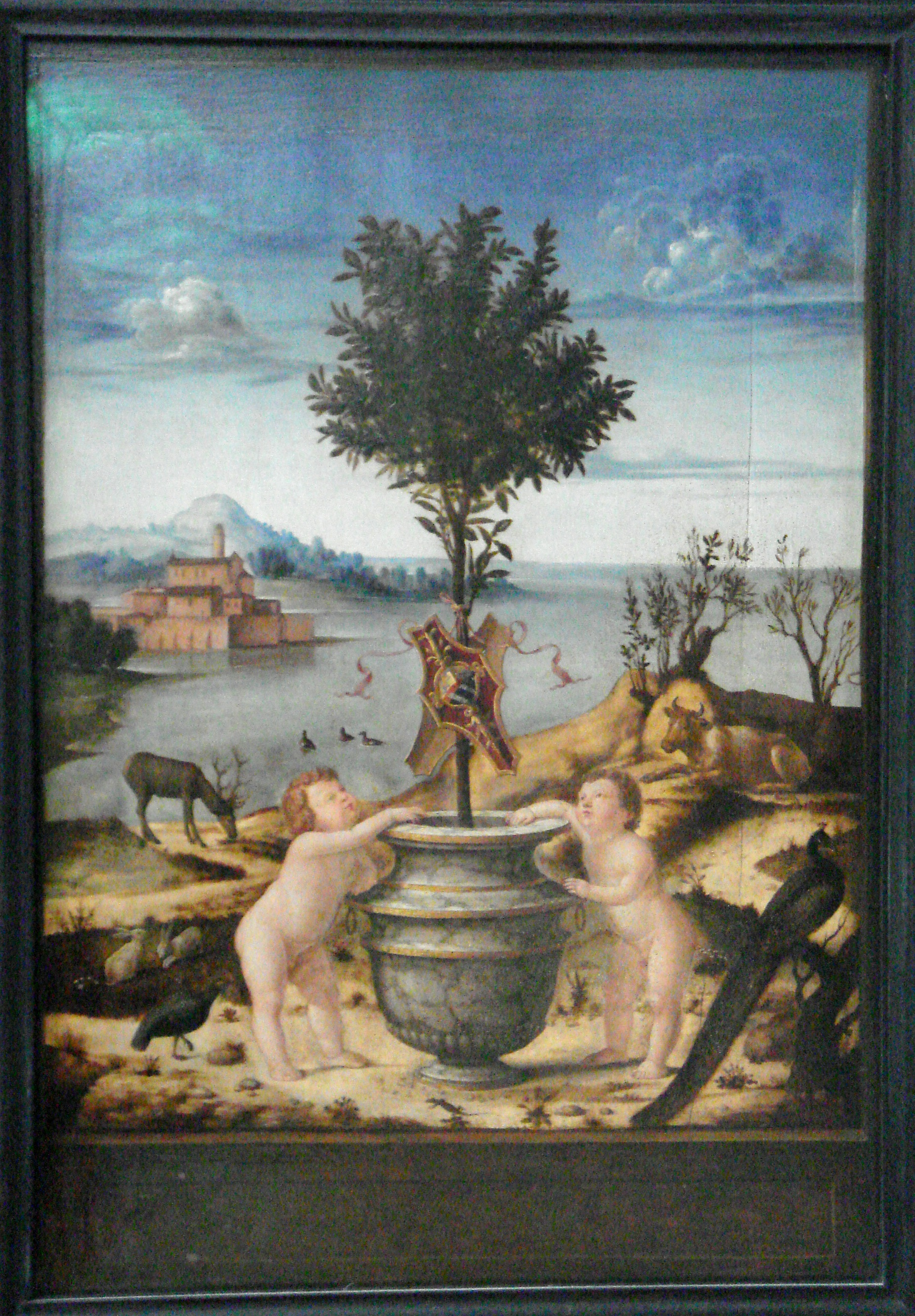
Left: Portrait of a man, by Marco Marziale.
Right: Allegory with unknown coat of arms. (Reverse of the portrait). Louvre Museum.

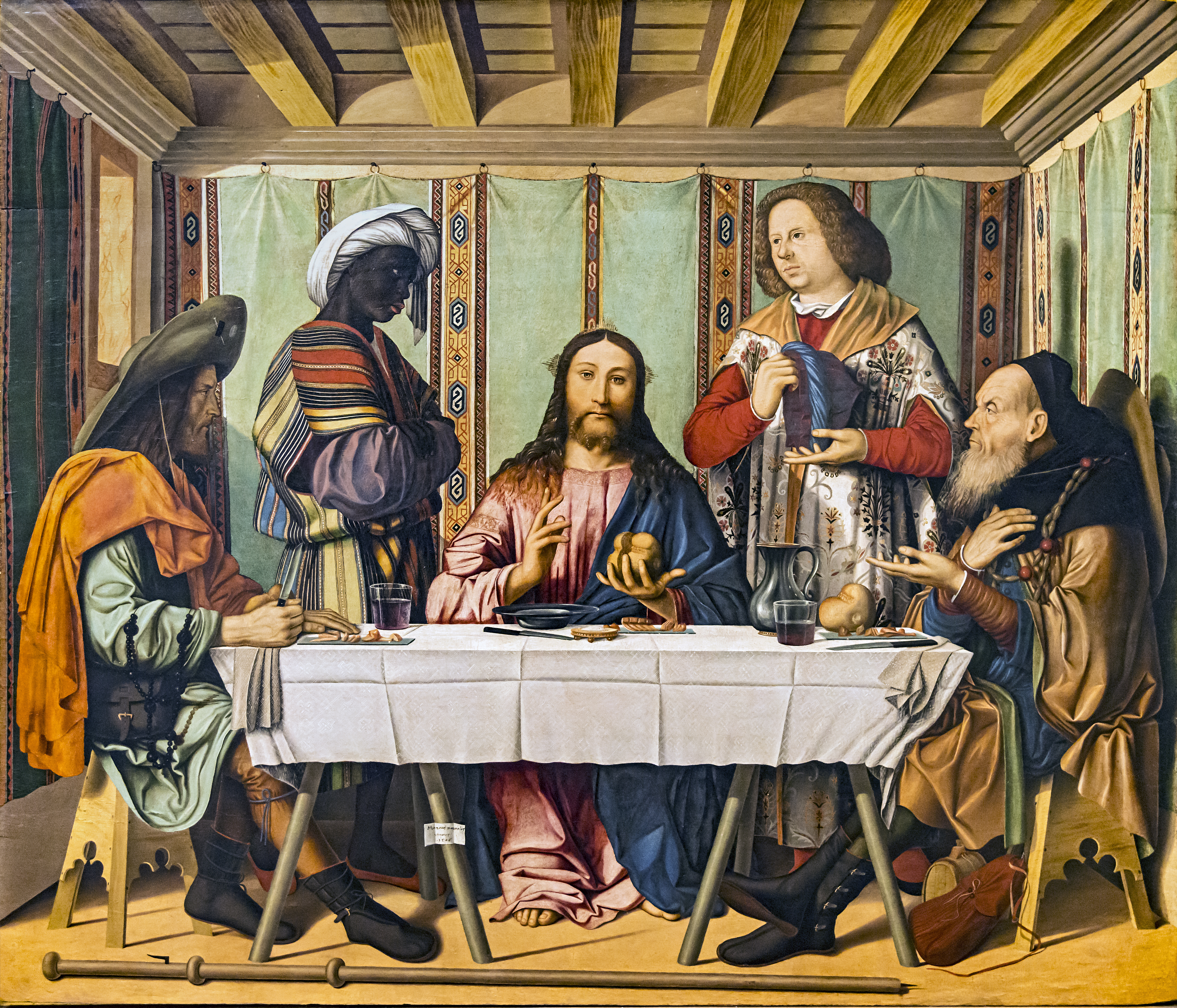
Supper at Emmaus - Gallerie dell'Accademia

Marco Marziale was a Venetian painter from, known to have been active from 1492/93 to 1507. He was a pupil of Giovanni Bellini, as stated in some of his inscriptions signing works, and was also influenced by Giovanni's brother Gentile, with possibly some elements of the style of Perugino also. From January 1493 (old Julian calendar), when he must have at least completed his training, he was employed by the Republic of Venice as an assistant to Giovanni Bellini on the Great Council Chamber in the Doge's Palace at a fairly modest salary. These paintings were all lost in the great fire of 1574. In 1493 he joined the confraternity of the Scuola di San Marco.

In about 1500 he may have moved to Cremona, which Venice had just taken over in 1499, and which it held until 1509, when the Duchy of Milan recaptured the city. Marziale would no doubt have been unwelcome after this, if he was in the city. He is not documented there, but painted two altarpieces for Cremonese churches; it is possible these were sent from Venice, although the records of the scuola show him as absent from the city in 1505. In 1507 he signed works now in London and Berlin, after which nothing further about him is known.

Several signed works are known, including the only two large altarpieces, both from churches in Cremona and now in the National Gallery, London. Two versions of the Supper at Emmaus, adapted from a lost work by Giovanni Bellini known from a print, are in the Gemäldegalerie, Berlin and the Gallerie dell'Accademia in Venice, where there is also a Circumcision of Jesus in the Museo Correr, dated 1499. Including unsigned attributed works, there is a probable surviving oeuvre of about a dozen paintings; apart from the wall-paintings lost in 1574, much of his painting may be among the large number of pieces assigned to the workshop of Giovanni Bellini. A small Adoration of the Magi, formerly in the Virginia Museum of Fine Arts, and only just attributed as an early work of Marziale's, was sold at Christie's, New York for $98,500 in January 2009.

He was a rather conservative painter, whose works continued to follow compositional formats from the late 15th century, despite his possibly being only a few years older than Giorgione and Titian. His main figures stand upright and still in the older Venetian style, already long superseded in Florentine art. Although his figures are stiff, even "wooden", he takes great interest in textiles and decor in his works. Both the London altarpieces are set in spaces in front of apses decorated with gold mosaics in the manner of San Marco, Venice, and also of altarpieces by Giovanni Bellini. The Circumcision altarpiece features several donor portraits of the family of Tommaso Raimondi, the lawyer and poet who commissioned the work; their lavish and fashionable clothes are carefully depicted. In 1872, the English critic John Ruskin asked a friend in Venice to make a careful drawing of the embroidered table-cloth, probably from Egypt, depicted in the Correr Circumcision, which Ruskin adapted into a pattern for wallpaper which he used in the study of his house Brantwood in the Lake District.

In Cremona, he influenced, and may have trained, Altobello Melone.
