= Supper at Emmaus (Veronese) =

Painting by Paolo Veronese

- Cena in Emmaus (Italian), Les Pèlerins d'Emmaüs (French)
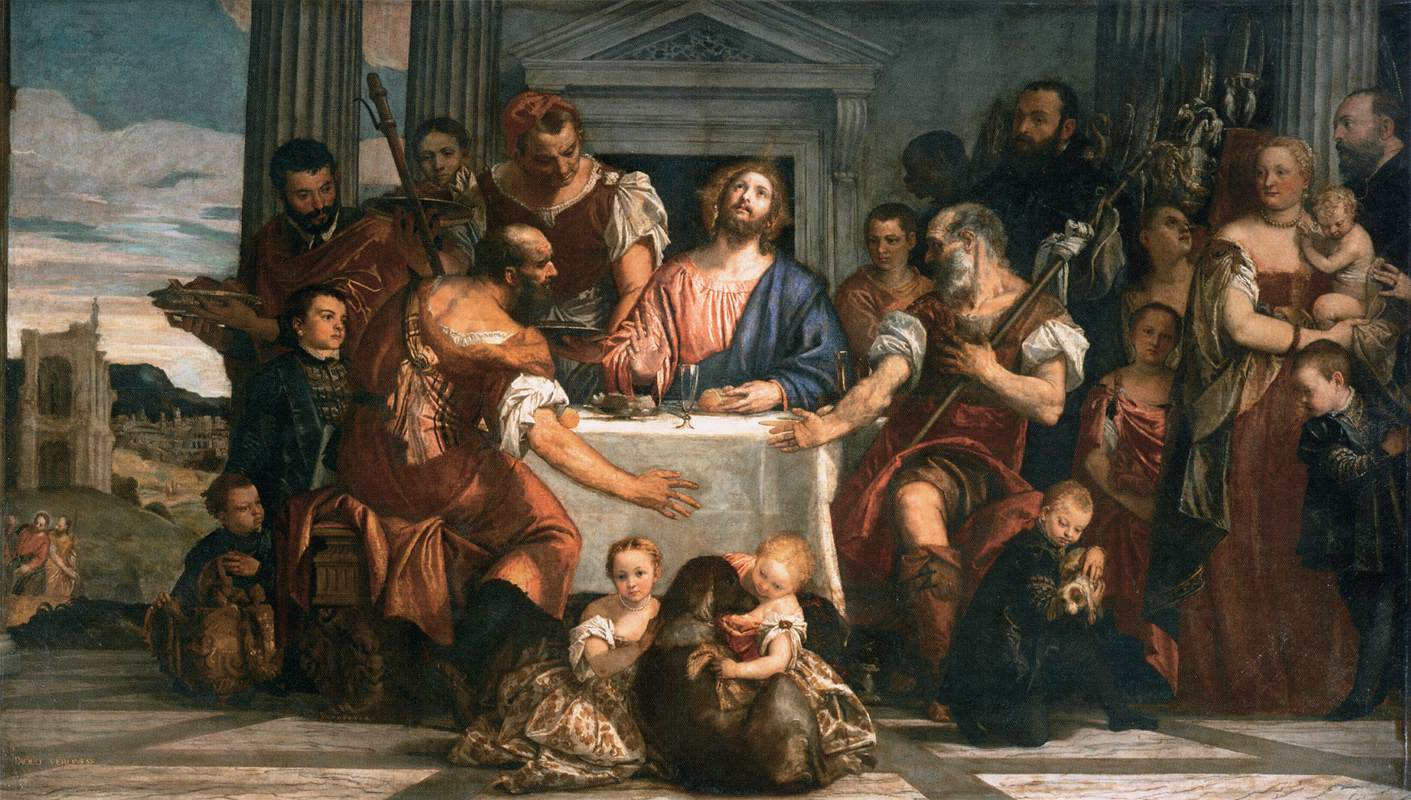
- Artist: Paolo Veronese
- Year: circa 1559–1560
- Medium: oil on canvas
- Subject: Road to Emmaus appearance
- Dimensions: 241 cm × 415 cm (7.91 ft × 13.62 ft)
- Location: Louvre, Paris
- Owner: Government of France

Supper at Emmaus (Cena in Emmaus) is a painting by Italian Renaissance artist Paolo Veronese. At the Louvre, where it is housed, it is known as Les Pèlerins d'Emmaüs (The Pilgrims of Emmaus). Painted circa 1559 or 1560, it is a reworking of the Gospel story of the resurrected Jesus's appearance in Emmaus as a 16th-century Venetian family gathering.

== Description ==
Paolo Veronese's Supper at Emmaus is a large 241×415 cm (8×14 feet) oil painting on canvas.

It depicts the biblical Gospel story of the resurrected Christ appearing on the road to Emmaus – and being finally recognized by two of his disciples who were on a pilgrimage to Emmaus, as he blesses the bread at a meal they had invited him, an apparent stranger, to. On the far left of the painting is a distant depiction of the journey to Emmaus; it includes the Septizodium, an ancient Roman edifice. As he blesses the bread and gazes heavenward, Christ's head has a delicate halo.

Surrounding the table where the three protagonists sit are over a dozen members of an aristocratic Venetian family, in sixteenth-century dress, and their servants. On the floor kneel three children, petting dogs; several other young children stand. A mother holds an infant; her husband stands behind them, and two other gentlemen, possibly his brothers, are in the group. The setting is a classical palace. Apart from the three biblical protagonists and a servant waiting on them, the atmosphere appears secular rather than devotional.

The architecture of the supper setting is striking, with four large classical columns and a pedimented door frame behind Christ. The painting was likely commissioned for a portego, the large and elaborate entrance hall of a Venetian palace.

Supper at Emmaus is the first of Veronese's biblical feast paintings portrayed as large, elaborate anachronistic group portraits in dramatic architectural settings. Subsequent examples include The Wedding at Cana (1563) and two versions of The Feast in the House of Simon the Pharisee (1565 and 1570).

== Ownership ==
The painting is owned by the government of France, and is part of the Louvre collection. It was formerly a possession of the French monarchy.

In 1635 the painting was recorded as owned by Victor Amadeus I, Duke of Savoy (1587–1637) at his residence in Turin. It was given shortly thereafter to Marshal Duke Charles de Blanchefort (1578–1638), and after his death it was one of his collection to pass to Cardinal Richelieu (1585–1642). Richelieu bequeathed it to King Louis XIII along with his Palais-Cardinal. It was later successively moved to the Palais de Fontainebleau, the Palais des Tuileries, and Louis XIV's Château de Versailles.

== Controversial restorations ==
The Louvre was sharply criticized by art conservationists in France, the UK, and the U.S. for a series of alterations it made to the painting from 2003–2004 and again in 2009. In addition to removing the folds of the mother's dress and of the disciple Luke's cloak in 2004, extensive alterations were made to the nose, mouth, and face of the mother in 2004 and 2009.

Concerning the 2003–2004 restorations, in 2007 Michel Favre-Félix, president of the Association Internationale pour le Respect de l’Intégrité du Patrimoine Artistique ("Association for the Respect and Integrity of Artistic Heritage") (ARIPA) in Paris, wrote in Nuances, the journal of ARIPA,

[T]he Venetian mother, with her noble and mature features and slightly melancholic look, has become a caricature of a 21st century adolescent with her awkward pout, her stiff expression, and obesity a-waiting.

This aesthetic manipulation is all the more grievous since the character of the mother is crucial in the composition intended by Veronese, who had painted more than a mere portrait of Venetian women. With her noble face and meditative look, this mother, carrying her newborn with his golden locks, evidently symbolised the Virgin Mary and Child. Protecting the little boy behind her cloak, she evokes the "Vierge de Miséricorde", who appears frequently in sacred iconography since the 13th century. Her husband stands behind, in an unassuming position attributed to Joseph in images of the Holy Family.

Favre-Félix's detailed 2007 descriptions of the various changes to the mother's face were reported in Le Journal des Arts in 2008 and 2009, and in Le Figaro in 2009. The Louvre subsequently made secret undisclosed additional changes to the face, in an apparent attempt to hide the mistakes, in September 2009 days before its "Titian, Tintoretto, Veronese" exhibition. These 2009 alterations were neither disclosed nor noted in the painting's restoration history file. Favre-Félix spotted the new undisclosed changes and posted an extensive analysis in the 2010–2011 edition of Nuances. In late 2010 he also wrote in the online journal of ArtWatch UK, "[T]he previously messed mouth has been blurred, not corrected. The nose had been given an awkward point and a baffling enlarged new nostril, while the cheek remains puffed. This remains another alien 21st century version and, as such, it further dishonours Veronese’s painting."

In December 2010, Michael Daley, director of ArtWatch UK, supplied four successive photographs of the mother's face in the painting to The Observer and stated that after the 2004 restoration:

The former softly turned, downward pointing nostril has been obliterated and replaced by an impossibly sharp-edged upper aperture that ends abruptly. This new not-nostril is horizontal, not downwards sloping, and it connects to a now fuzzed and mutilated nose tip that hovers disconnectedly over an anatomical void. The head had been given a blander, puffed-out balloon-like quality. There was no evidence or authority for these changes in the photograph of the cleaned-but-not-yet-restored state.

Daley said that the covert 2009 correction showed an attempt to undo some of the errors, but others were introduced: "The tip of the nose has been turned down once again, but it has also been sharpened" and has a "grotesquely large nostril", and the lips have become "swollen and formless".

== Related paintings ==
Two paintings which are copies – one of the two girls and one of the two boys – of the children playing with the two dogs in Supper at Emmaus hang in the Musée des Beaux-Arts de Dijon, acquired in 1799. The two paintings have neutral backgrounds which remove traces of other characters. They may have been painted by François Stiémart (1680–1740), although this is highly uncertain.

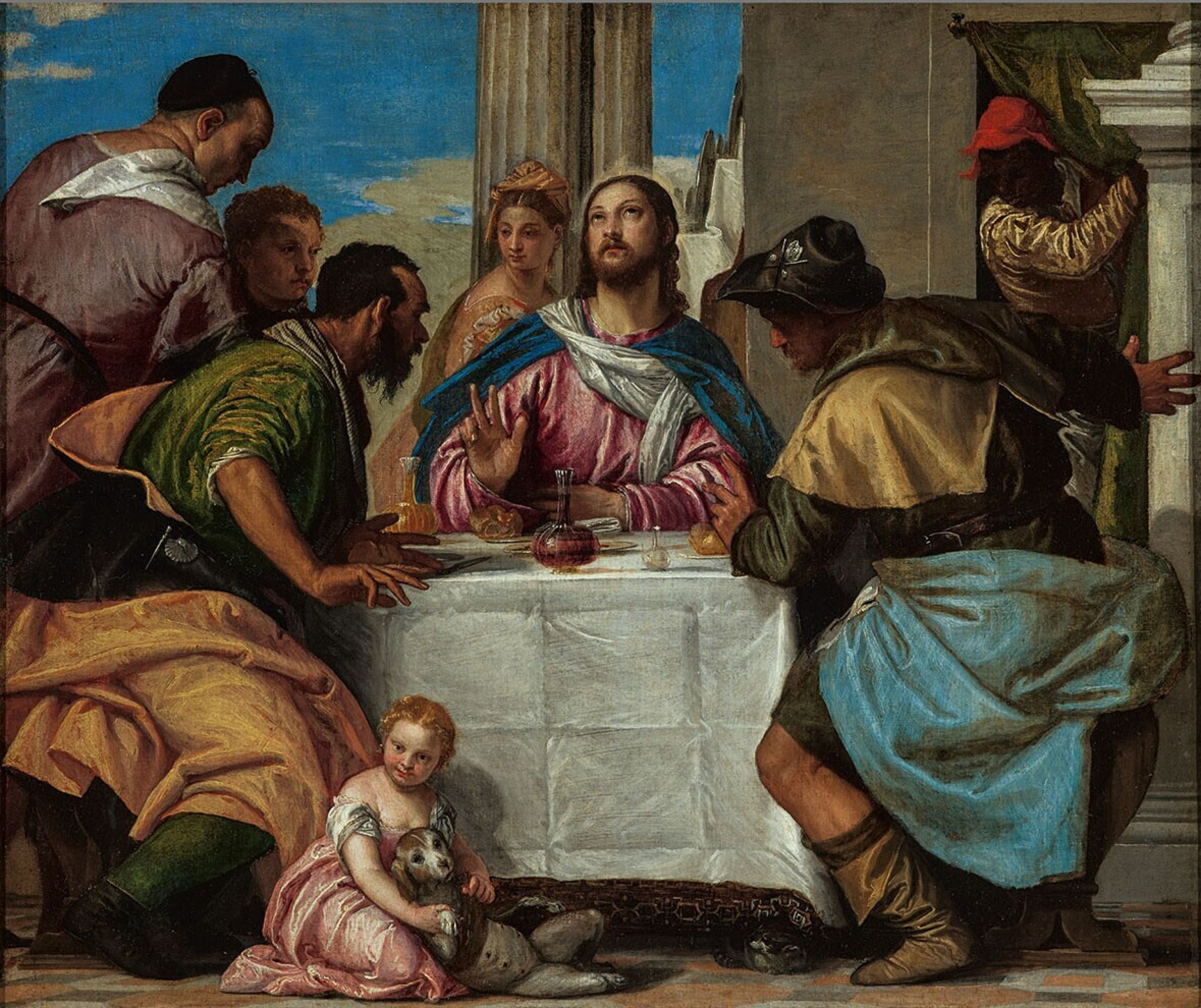
Veronese's much smaller Supper at Emmaus, painted c. 1565–1570, and held by the Museum Boijmans Van Beuningen

Later in life, Veronese painted another Supper at Emmaus, one much smaller. This later painting portrays only three peripheral adults in addition to the four protagonists, plus a young girl on the floor holding a dog.

This painting is 66×79 cm (26×31 in), was probably painted circa 1565–1570, and is held by the Museum Boijmans Van Beuningen in Rotterdam, Netherlands, which acquired it in 1958. According to the museum's website, the painting is in storage.
