= Supper at Emmaus (Rembrandt, Louvre) =

Painting by Rembrandt

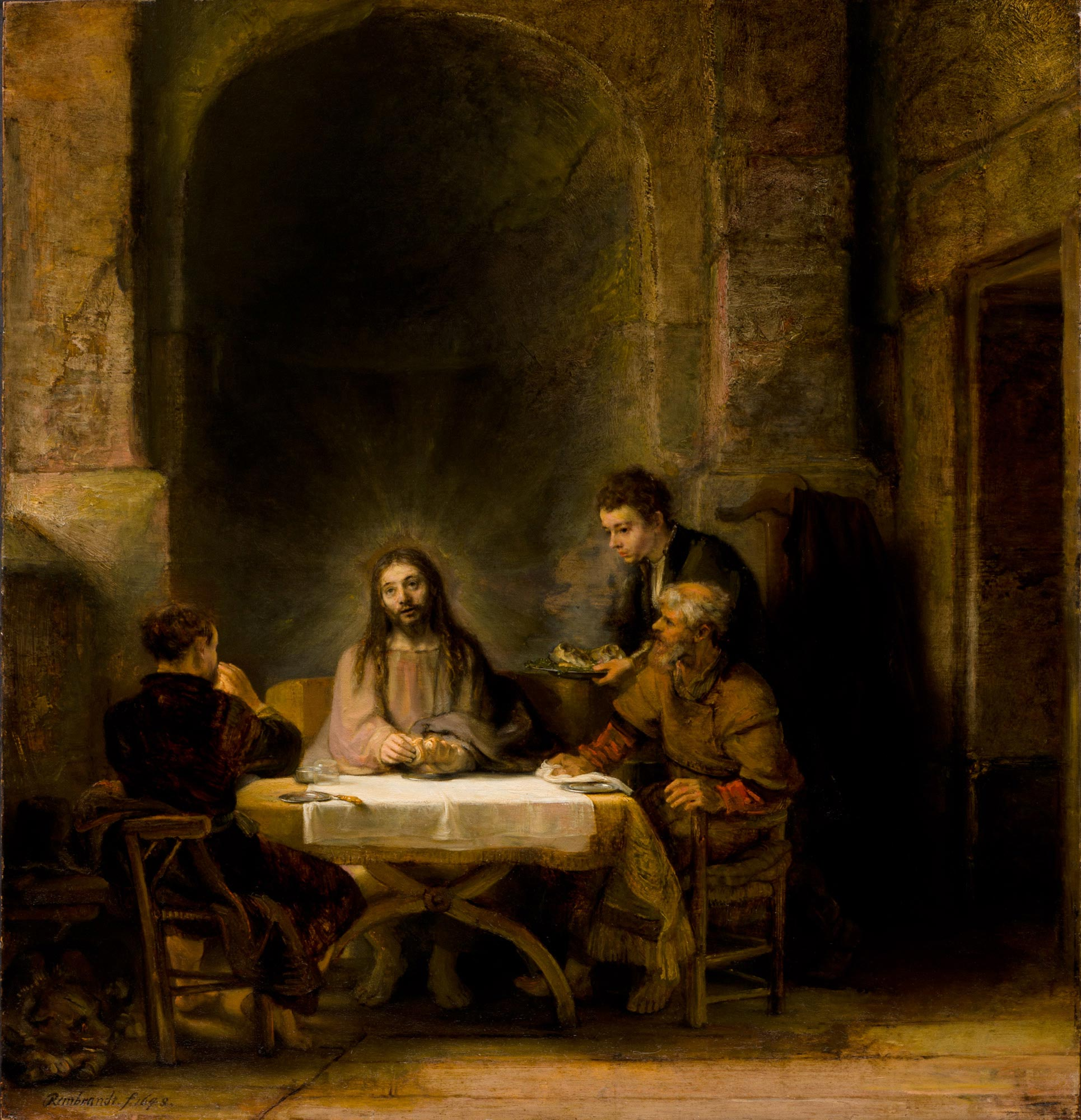
- Artist: Rembrandt
- Year: 1648
- Medium: Oil on mahogany
- Movement: Baroque
- Dimensions: 68 cm × 65 cm (27 in × 26 in)
- Location: Louvre, Paris

Supper at Emmaus or The Pilgrims at Emmaus is a 1648 oil on mahogany panel painting by Rembrandt. It depicts the Gospel story of the resurrected Jesus's appearance in Emmaus.

It was sold at the sale of the collection of Willem Six on 12 May 1734 in Amsterdam and then at three Paris sales before finally being acquired for the French royal collection in 1777 at a fourth sale. It is now in the Louvre in Paris.
