= Oratorio della Santissima Trinità, Momo =

Roman Catholic church in Momo, Italy

Coordinates: 45.588732°N 8.544029°E

The Oratorio della Santissima Trinità, or Oratory of the Holy Trinity, is a Romanesque, Roman Catholic church located about two kilometers north of the town of Momo, on the west bank of the strada regionale 229, in the province of Novara, Piedmont, Italy.

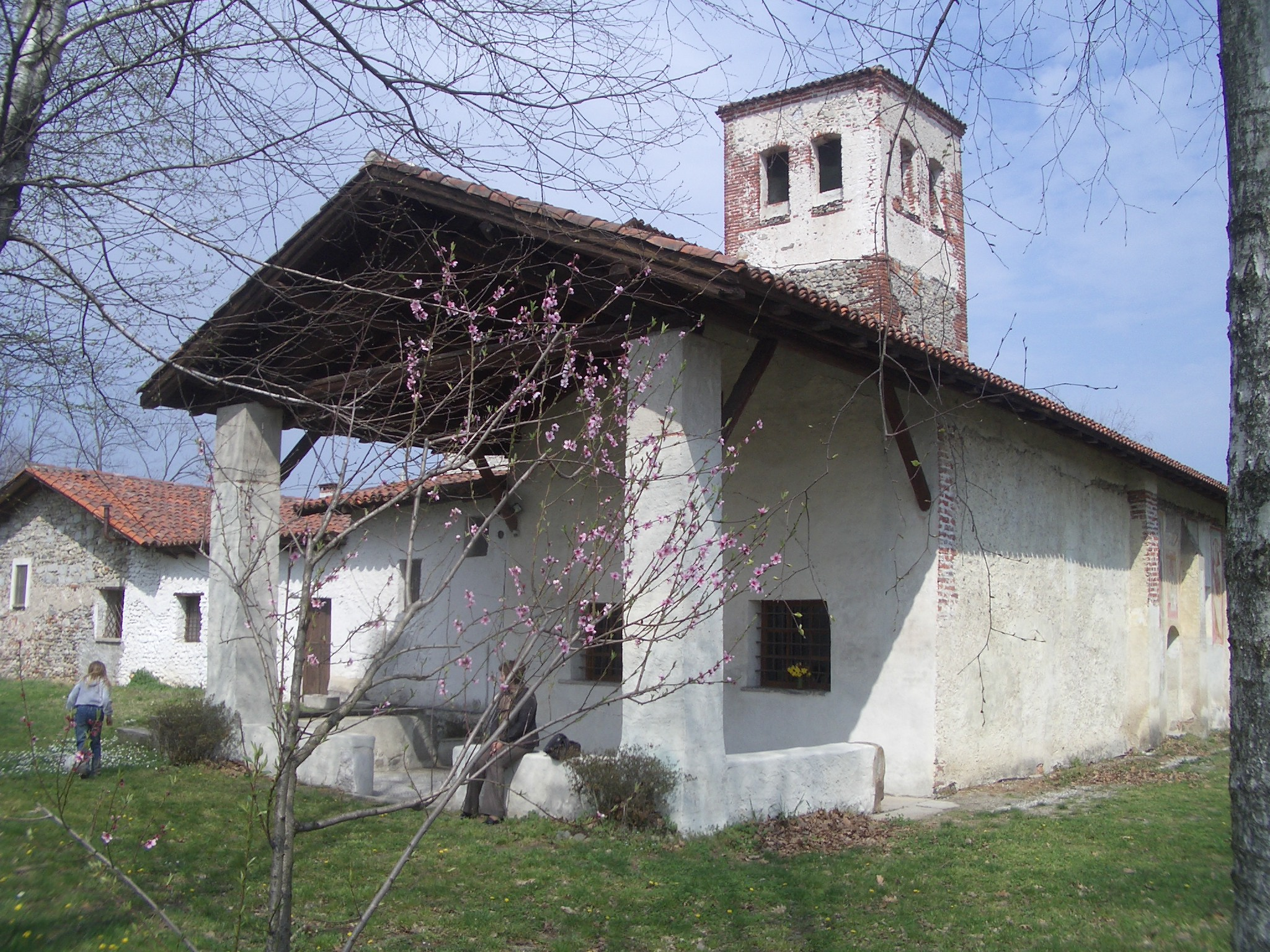
South entrance facing the road.

== History ==
The small indistinct building with a stone, brick, and stucco bell tower, reflects multiple reconstructions. The oratory was initially built in the mid to late 11th century, but rebuilt and expanded over the next two centuries until it was labelled a church. The bell tower has stones arrayed in herringbone orientations, interspersed with brick. In the 17th century, a hermitage for a single occupant was attached to the chapel.

While the exterior is mainly rustic, the oratory is known for its frescoes from the late 15th and early 16th centuries. Five of them survive on the southern exterior flank, depicting San Grato of Aosta (protector against inclement weather), St Antony Abbot, St Giulio, the Pieta, and St Christopher (patron of travellers).

The interior of the church was frescoed in 1512 by the Sperindio brothers and Francesco Cagnola. Along the walls of the nave are depictions of the Life and Passion of Christ. Some of the events derive from the New Testament Biblical Apocrypha.

Cagnola painted thirty-seven squares, framed by white or red bands: thirteen depict Stories of Christ's childhood, twenty-three Stories of his Passion and finally the Story of Original Sin. In the counterfacade arch, there is a depiction of the Final Judgment. In the apse, the superior portion depicts the Annunciation and Incarnation, while below is a Holy Trinity in an awkward mandorla. The lower registers have a panel of apostles, and below them, allegories of the Seven Works of Mercy.

== Gallery of Cagnola frescoes ==
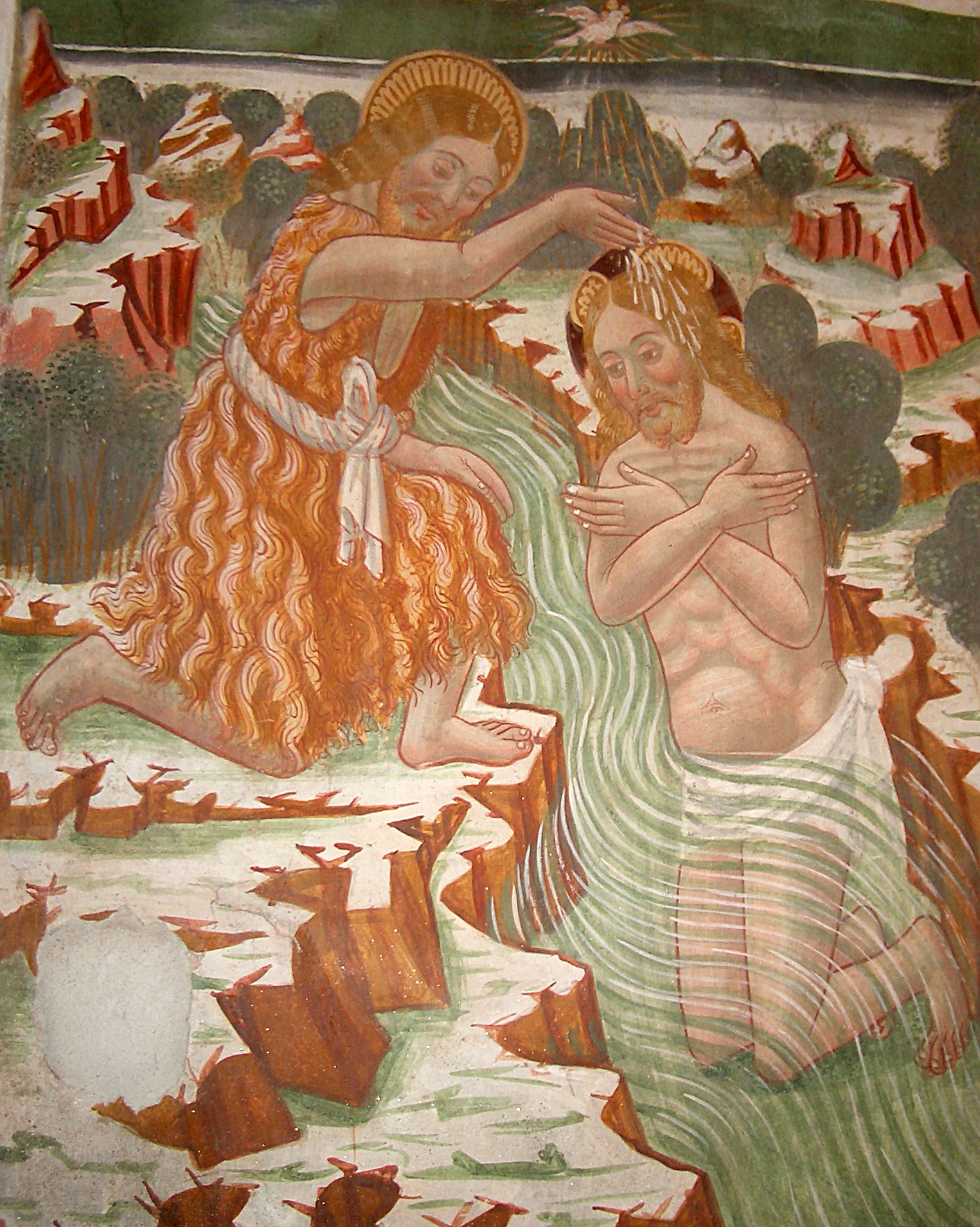
Baptism of Jesus

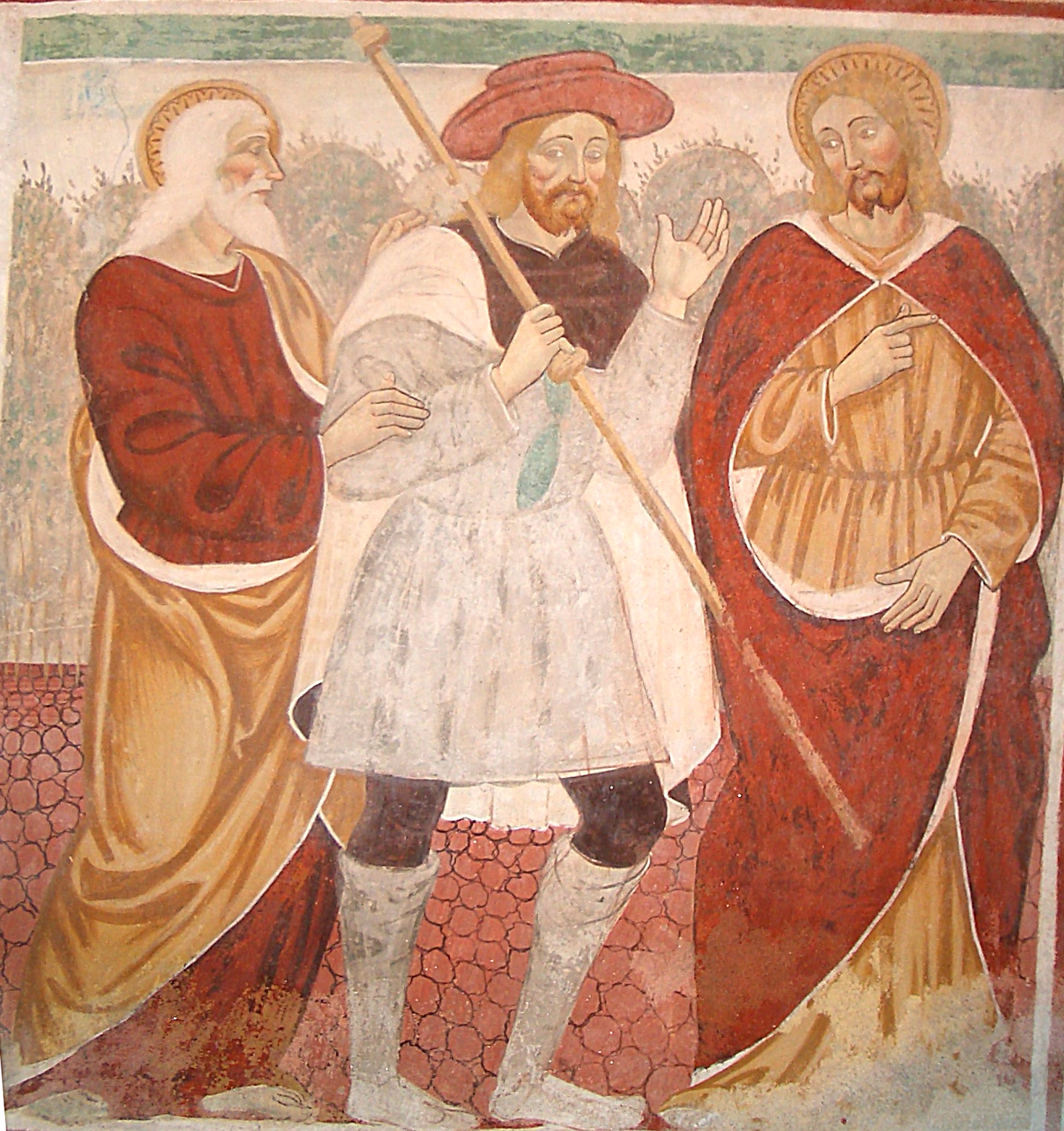
Disciples of Emmaus

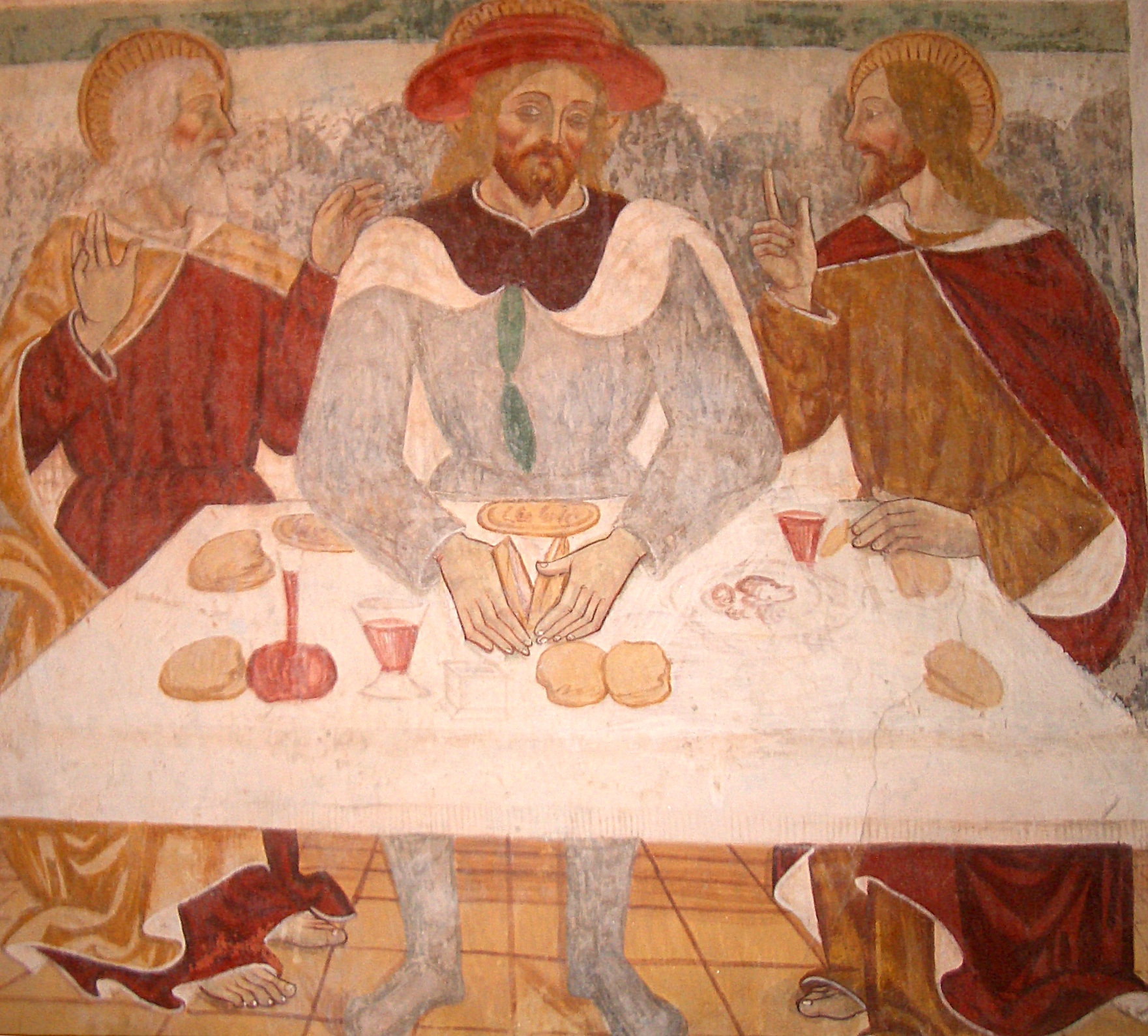
Supper at Emmaus

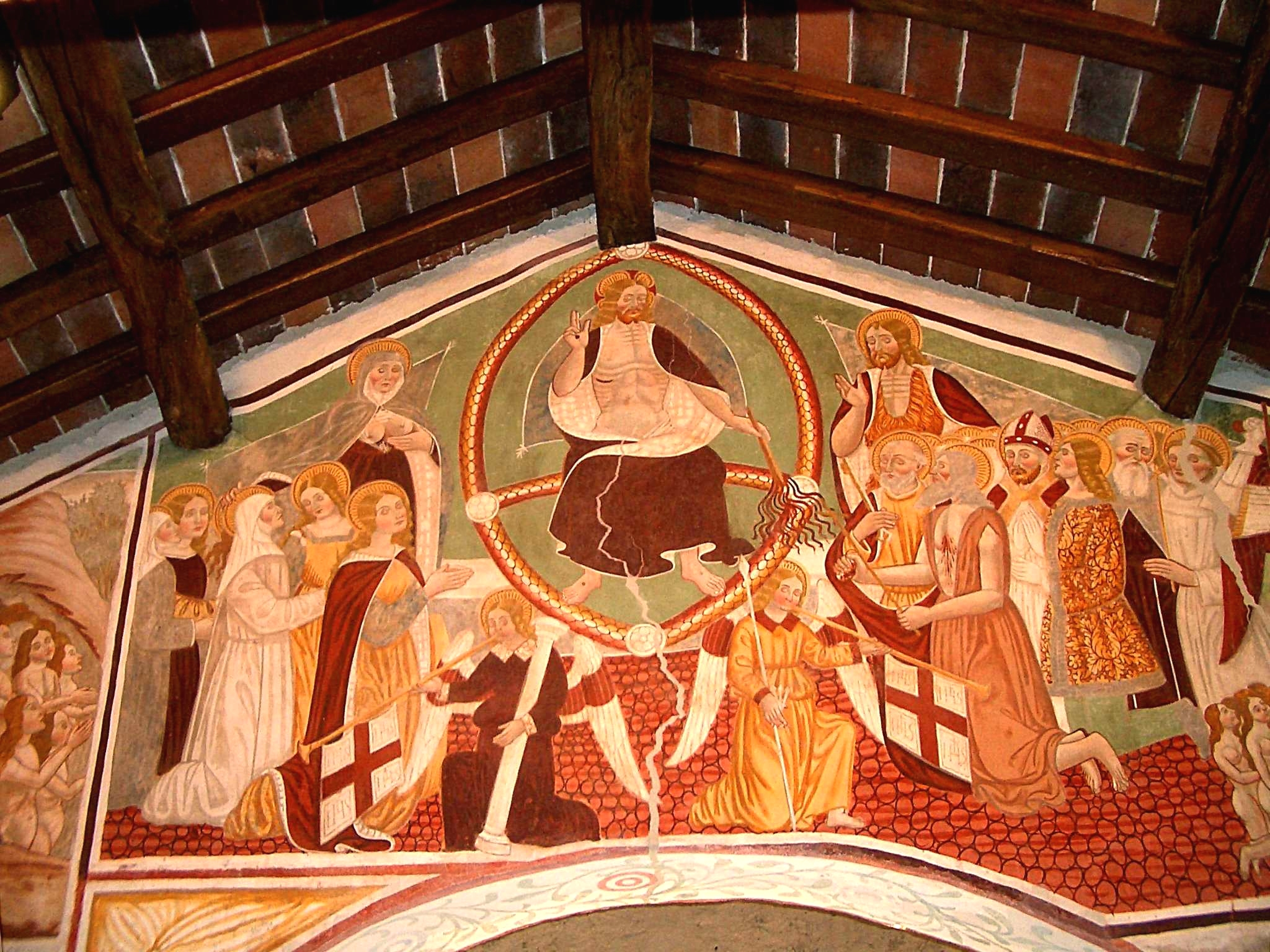
Last Judgement (center panel)
