= Momo, Piedmont =

Momo
- Comune
- Comune di Momo
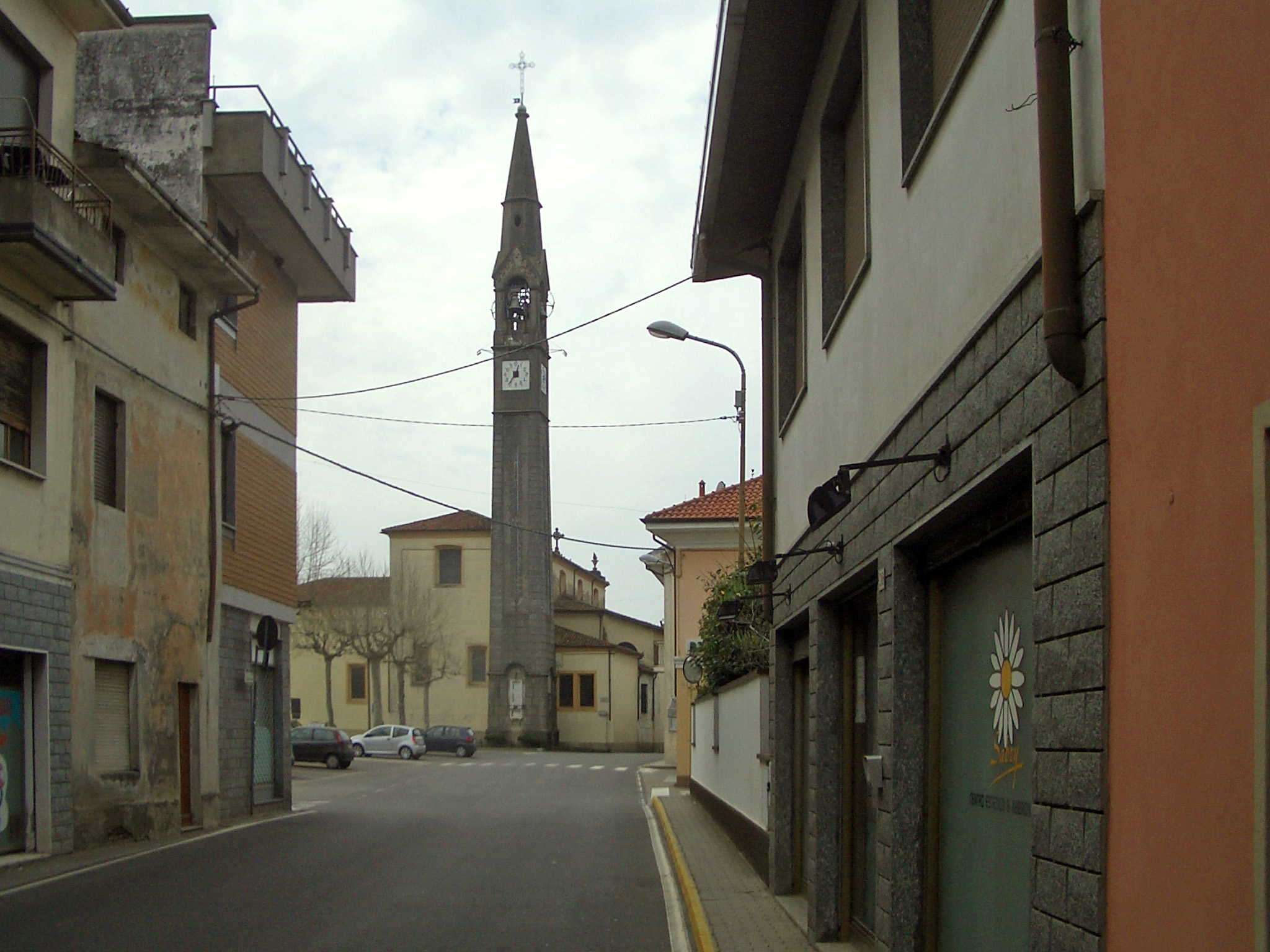
- View of Momo

- Location within Italy Location within Piedmont
- Coordinates: 45°35′N 8°33′E
- Country: Italy
- Region: Piedmont
- Province: Novara (NO)

Government
  - Mayor: Sabrina Faccio

Area
  - Total: 23.59 km^{2} (9.11 sq mi)
- Elevation: 213 m (699 ft)

Population (Dec. 2004)
  - Total: 2,713
  - Density: 115.0/km^{2} (297.9/sq mi)
- Demonym: Momesi
- Time zone: UTC+1 (CET)
  - Summer (DST): UTC+2 (CEST)
- Postal code: 28015
- Dialing code: 0321
- Website: Official website

Momo is a comune (municipality) in the Province of Novara in the Italian region Piedmont, located about 90 kilometres (56 mi) northeast of Turin and about 15 kilometres (9 mi) northwest of Novara.

Momo borders the following municipalities: Barengo, Bellinzago Novarese, Briona, Caltignaga, Oleggio, and Vaprio d'Agogna.

The Oratory of the Holiest Trinity is located two kilometres north of the town.
